= David Cameron =

Prime Minister of the United Kingdom from 2010 to 2016

The Right Honourable The Lord Cameron of Chipping Norton PC
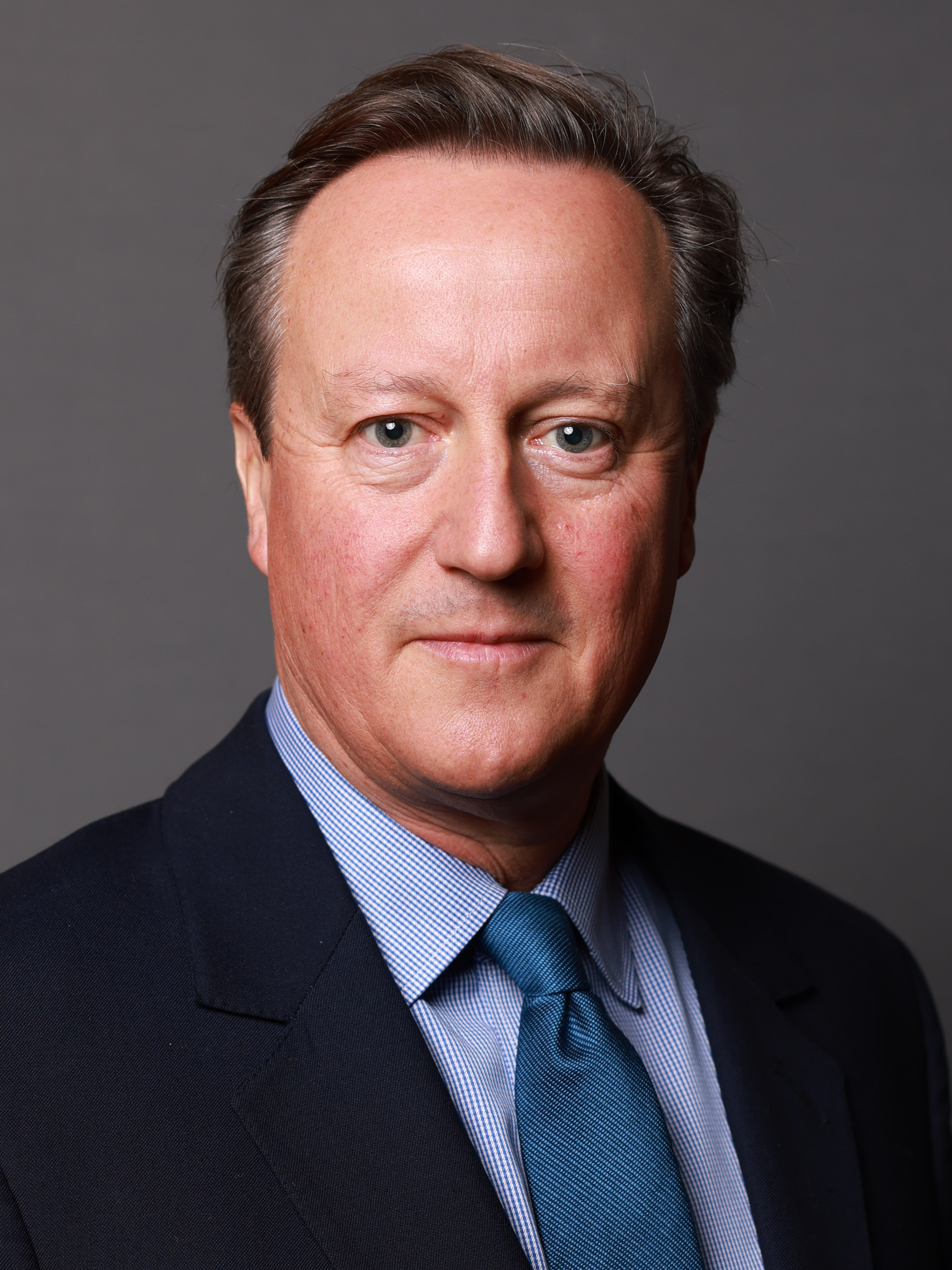
- Official portrait, 2023

Prime Minister of the United Kingdom
- In office 11 May 2010 – 13 July 2016
- Monarch: Elizabeth II
- Deputy: Nick Clegg (2010–2015)
- First Secretary: William Hague; George Osborne
- Preceded by: Gordon Brown
- Succeeded by: Theresa May

Leader of the Opposition
- In office 6 December 2005 – 11 May 2010
- Monarch: Elizabeth II
- Prime Minister: Tony Blair; Gordon Brown
- Deputy: William Hague
- Preceded by: Michael Howard
- Succeeded by: Harriet Harman

Leader of the Conservative Party
- In office 6 December 2005 – 11 July 2016
- Preceded by: Michael Howard
- Succeeded by: Theresa May

Foreign Secretary
- In office 13 November 2023 – 5 July 2024
- Prime Minister: Rishi Sunak
- Deputy: Andrew Mitchell (Apr–Jul 2024)
- Preceded by: James Cleverly
- Succeeded by: David Lammy
Shadow portfolios
Shadow Secretary of State for Education and Skills
In office 10 May 2005 – 6 December 2005
Leader	Michael Howard
Preceded by	Tim Collins
Succeeded by	David Willetts
Conservative Policy Review Coordinator
In office 14 June 2004 – 10 May 2005
Leader	Michael Howard
Preceded by	David Willetts
Succeeded by	Oliver Letwin

Member of the House of Lords
- Lord Temporal
- Life peerage 17 November 2023

Member of Parliament for Witney
- In office 7 June 2001 – 12 September 2016
- Preceded by: Shaun Woodward
- Succeeded by: Robert Courts

Personal details
- Born: David William Donald Cameron; 9 October 1966 (age 60) Marylebone, London, England
- Party: Conservative
- Spouse: Samantha Sheffield (m. 1996)
- Children: 4
- Relatives: Cameron family
- Education: Brasenose College, Oxford (MA)
- David Cameron's voice Cameron's first speech as prime minister Recorded 11 May 2010

David William Donald Cameron, Baron Cameron of Chipping Norton (born 9 October 1966), is a British politician who served as Prime Minister of the United Kingdom from 2010 to 2016. Cameron was Leader of the Conservative Party from 2005 to 2016 and Leader of the Opposition from 2005 to 2010. He was Member of Parliament (MP) for Witney from 2001 to 2016. After his premiership he was elevated to the House of Lords as a life peer in November 2023 to serve as Foreign Secretary in the Sunak ministry until July 2024. Cameron identifies as a one-nation conservative and has been associated with both economically and socially liberal policies. He is the most recent British prime minister to have held the office continually for a full parliament.

Born in London to an upper-middle-class family, Cameron was educated at Eton College and Brasenose College, Oxford. After becoming an MP at the 2001 general election, he served in the opposition Shadow Cabinet under the Conservative leader Michael Howard, and succeeded Howard in 2005. Following the 2010 general election, negotiations led to Cameron becoming prime minister as the head of a coalition government formed by the Conservative Party and the Liberal Democrats.

Cameron's premiership was marked by the effects of the 2008 financial crisis and the Great Recession, which the government sought to address through austerity measures. Parliament passed the Health and Social Care Act and the Welfare Reform Act, which allowed the government to introduce large-scale changes to healthcare and welfare. The government also attempted to enforce stricter immigration policies via the Home Office hostile environment policy, introduced reforms to education, and oversaw the 2012 London Olympics. It privatised Royal Mail and some other state assets, implemented the Equality Act 2010, and legalised same-sex marriage in England and Wales. Internationally, Cameron oversaw Operation Ellamy in the First Libyan Civil War and authorised the bombing of the Islamic State in Syria. Constitutionally, the government oversaw the 2011 United Kingdom Alternative Vote referendum and the 2014 Scottish independence referendum, both of which confirmed Cameron's favoured "no" outcome. When the Conservatives secured an unexpected majority in the 2015 general election, Cameron began leading a Conservative-majority government. He introduced the Brexit referendum on the UK's continuing membership of the European Union in 2016, and supported the Britain Stronger in Europe campaign, which lost. Following the success of Vote Leave, Cameron resigned as prime minister and party leader and was succeeded by Theresa May, his home secretary.

Cameron resigned his seat in the House of Commons in September 2016, and thereafter maintained a low political profile for several years. He was president of Alzheimer's Research UK from 2017 to 2023, and returned to this position in 2025. He was implicated in the Greensill scandal. His memoir, For the Record, was published in 2019. In 2023 he was appointed foreign secretary by Rishi Sunak, that appointment facilitated by his becoming a member of the House of Lords as a life peer. He served as foreign secretary until the Conservatives lost the 2024 general election.

Cameron has been credited for helping to modernise the Conservative Party and for reducing the UK's national deficit. He has also been criticised for austerity measures, his support for foreign intervention in the Libyan and Syrian civil wars, as well as his decision to hold the EU membership referendum, which led to political instability in the UK during the late 2010s.

== Early life and education ==
=== Early family life ===
David William Donald Cameron was born on 9 October 1966 at the London Clinic in Marylebone, London, and raised at Peasemore in Berkshire. He has two sisters and had an elder brother, Alexander Cameron (1963–2023). David is the younger son of Ian Donald Cameron, a stockbroker, and his wife Mary Fleur, a retired Justice of the Peace and the daughter of Sir William Mount, 2nd Baronet. David also descends from King William IV and his mistress Dorothea Jordan through their illegitimate daughter Lady Elizabeth FitzClarence to the fifth-female-generation Enid Agnes Maud Levita. Therefore, through his descent from William IV's father, George III, Cameron is sixth cousin once removed to King Charles III.

Cameron's father was born at Blairmore House near Huntly, Aberdeenshire, and died near Toulon, France, on 8 September 2010; Blairmore was built by Cameron's great-great-grandfather Alexander Geddes, who had made a fortune in the grain trade in Chicago in the United States before returning to Scotland in the 1880s. Blairmore was sold soon after Ian's birth.

Cameron has said: "On my mother's side of the family, her mother was a Llewellyn, so Welsh. I'm a real mixture of Scottish, Welsh and English." He has also referenced the German Jewish ancestry of one of his great-grandfathers, Arthur Levita, a descendant of the Yiddish author Elia Levita.

=== Education ===
Cameron was educated at two private schools. From the age of seven, he was taught at Heatherdown School in Winkfield, Berkshire. Owing to good grades, he entered its top academic class almost two years early. At the age of 13, he went on to Eton College in Berkshire, following his father and elder brother. His early interest was in art. Six weeks before taking his O-levels, he was caught smoking cannabis. He admitted the offence and had not been involved in selling drugs, so he was not expelled; instead he was fined, prevented from leaving the school grounds and given a "Georgic" (a punishment that involved copying 500 lines of Latin text).

Cameron passed twelve O-levels and then three A levels: History of Art; History, in which he was taught by Michael Kidson; and Economics with Politics. He obtained three 'A' grades and a '1' grade in the scholarship level exam in Economics and Politics. The following autumn, he passed the entrance exam for the University of Oxford, and was offered an exhibition at Brasenose College.

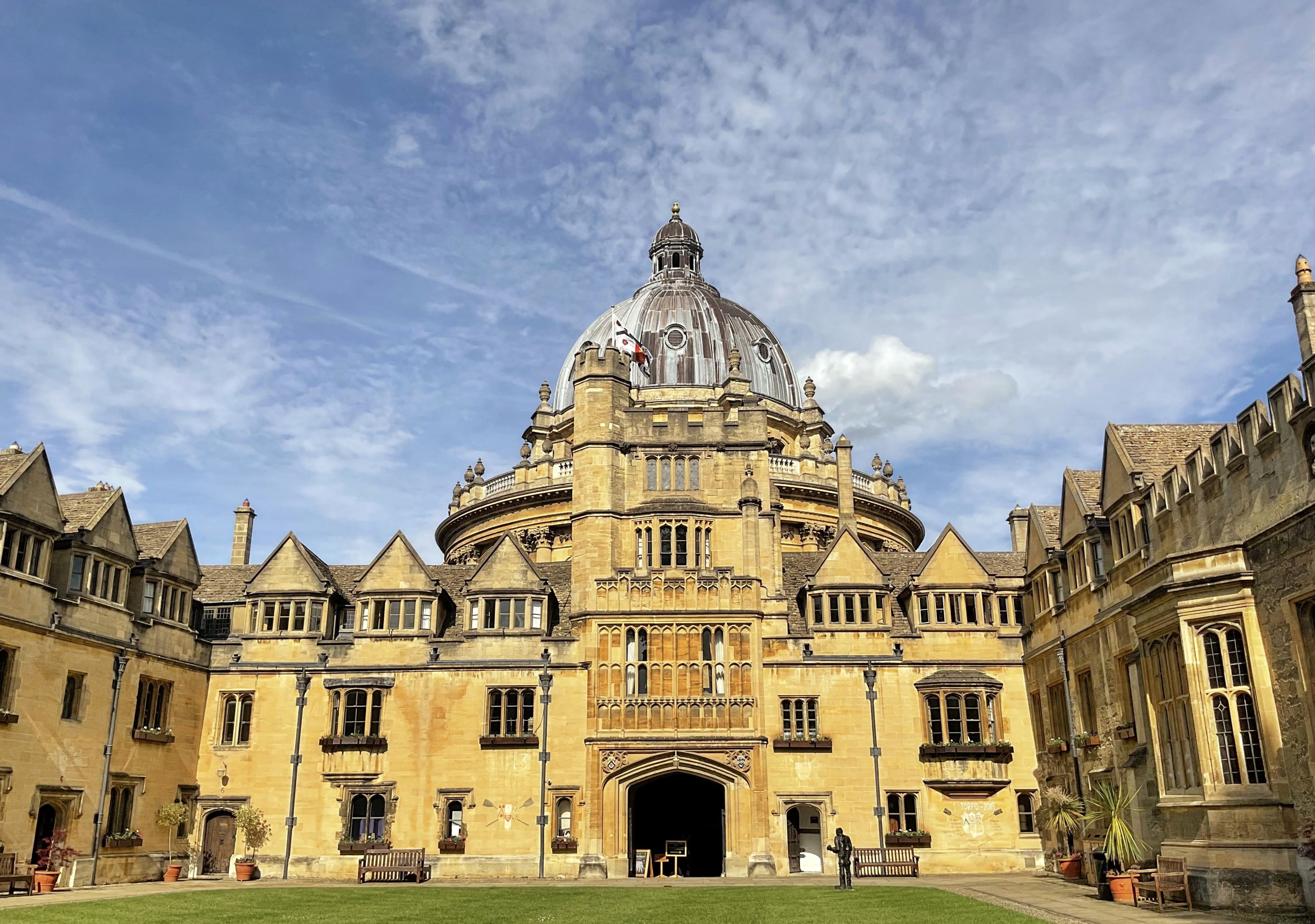
Brasenose College, Oxford

After leaving Eton in 1984 Cameron started a nine-month gap year. For three months, he worked as a researcher for his godfather Tim Rathbone, then Conservative MP for Lewes, during which time he attended debates in the House of Commons. Through his father, he was then employed for a further three months in Hong Kong by Jardine Matheson as a 'ship jumper', an administrative post.

Returning from Hong Kong, Cameron visited the Soviet Union, where he was approached by two Russian men speaking fluent English. He was later told by one of his professors that it was "definitely an attempt" by the KGB to recruit him.

In October 1985 Cameron began his Bachelor of Arts course in Philosophy, Politics and Economics (PPE) at Brasenose. His tutor, Vernon Bogdanor, has described him as "one of the ablest" students he has taught, with "moderate and sensible Conservative" political views.

Guy Spier, who shared tutorials with Cameron, remembers him as an outstanding student: "We were doing our best to grasp basic economic concepts. David—there was nobody else who came even close. He would be integrating them with the way the British political system is put together. He could have lectured me on it, and I would have sat there and taken notes." When commenting in 2006 on his former pupil's ideas about a "Bill of Rights" to replace the Human Rights Act, however, Bogdanor, himself a Liberal Democrat, said: "I think he is very confused. I've read his speech and it's filled with contradictions. There are one or two good things in it but one glimpses them, as it were, through a mist of misunderstanding".

At Oxford Cameron become a member of the controversial Bullingdon Club, an exclusive all-male dining society for Oxford University's students with a reputation for elitism, and a culture of excessive drinking associated with boisterous behaviour and damaging property. In his 2019 memoir For the Record, Cameron wrote about being a member of the Bullingdon, his regret for having joined and its impact on his political career, saying "When I look now at the much-reproduced photograph taken of our group of appallingly over-self-confident 'sons of privilege', I cringe. If I had known at the time the grief I would get for that picture, of course I would never have joined. But life isn't like that..." and: "These were also the years after the ITV adaptation of Brideshead Revisited when quite a few of us were carried away by the fantasy of an Evelyn Waugh-like Oxford existence." Cameron's period in the Bullingdon Club was examined in a 2009 Channel 4 docudrama, When Boris Met Dave, the title referring to Boris Johnson, another high-profile Conservative Party figure, the then-mayor of London, who had been a member at the same time, and who would go on to be prime minister himself.

Cameron graduated in 1988 with a first-class BA degree (later promoted to an MA by seniority).

== Early political career ==
=== Conservative Research Department ===
After graduation, Cameron worked for the Conservative Research Department between September 1988 and 1993. His first brief was Trade and Industry, Energy and Privatisation; he befriended fellow young colleagues, including Edward Llewellyn, Ed Vaizey and Rachel Whetstone. They and others formed a group they called the "Smith Square set", which was dubbed the "Brat Pack" by the press, though it is better known as the "Notting Hill set", a name given to it pejoratively by Derek Conway. In 1991 Cameron was seconded to Downing Street to work on briefing John Major for the then twice-weekly sessions of Prime Minister's Questions. One newspaper gave Cameron the credit for "sharper ... Despatch box performances" by Major, which included highlighting for Major "a dreadful piece of doublespeak" by Tony Blair (then the Labour Employment spokesman) over the effect of a national minimum wage. He became head of the political section of the Conservative Research Department, and in August 1991 was tipped to follow Judith Chaplin as political secretary to the prime minister.

Cameron lost to Jonathan Hill, who was appointed in March 1992. Instead, he was given the responsibility for briefing Major for his press conferences during the 1992 general election. During the campaign, Cameron was one of the young "brat pack" of party strategists who worked between 12 and 20 hours a day, sleeping in the house of Alan Duncan in Gayfere Street, Westminster, which had been Major's campaign headquarters during his bid for the Conservative leadership. Cameron headed the economic section. It was while working on this campaign that Cameron first worked closely with and befriended Steve Hilton, who was later to become Director of Strategy during his party leadership. The strain of getting up at 04:45 every day was reported to have led Cameron to decide to leave politics in favour of journalism.

=== Special adviser to the chancellor ===
The Conservatives' unexpected success in the 1992 election led Cameron to hit back at older party members who had criticised him and his colleagues, saying "whatever people say about us, we got the campaign right", and that they had listened to their campaign workers on the ground rather than the newspapers. He revealed he had led other members of the team across Smith Square to jeer at Transport House, the former Labour headquarters. Cameron was rewarded with a promotion to special adviser to the chancellor of the exchequer, Norman Lamont.

Cameron was working for Lamont at the time of Black Wednesday, when pressure from currency speculators forced the pound sterling out of the European Exchange Rate Mechanism. At the 1992 Conservative Party conference, he had difficulty trying to arrange to brief the speakers in the economic debate, having to resort to putting messages on the internal television system imploring the mover of the motion, Patricia Morris, to contact him. Later that month, Cameron joined a delegation of Special Advisers who visited Germany to build better relations with the Christian Democratic Union; he was reported to be "still smarting" over the Bundesbank's contribution to the economic crisis.

Lamont fell out with John Major after Black Wednesday and became highly unpopular with the public. Taxes needed to be raised in the 1993 Budget, and Cameron fed the options Lamont was considering through to Conservative Campaign Headquarters for their political acceptability to be assessed. By May 1993, the Conservatives' average poll rating dropped below 30%, where they would remain until the 1997 general election. Major and Lamont's personal ratings also declined dramatically. Lamont's unpopularity did not necessarily affect Cameron, who was considered as a potential "kamikaze" candidate for the Newbury by-election, which includes the area where he grew up. However, Cameron decided not to stand.

During the by-election, Lamont gave the response "Je ne regrette rien" to a question about whether he most regretted claiming to see "the green shoots of recovery" or admitting to "singing in his bath" with happiness at leaving the European Exchange Rate Mechanism. Cameron was identified by one journalist as having inspired this gaffe; it was speculated that the heavy Conservative defeat in Newbury may have cost Cameron his chance of becoming chancellor himself, even though as he was not a member of Parliament he could not have been. Lamont was sacked at the end of May 1993, and decided not to write the usual letter of resignation; Cameron was given the responsibility to issue to the press a statement of self-justification.

=== Special Adviser to the Home Secretary ===
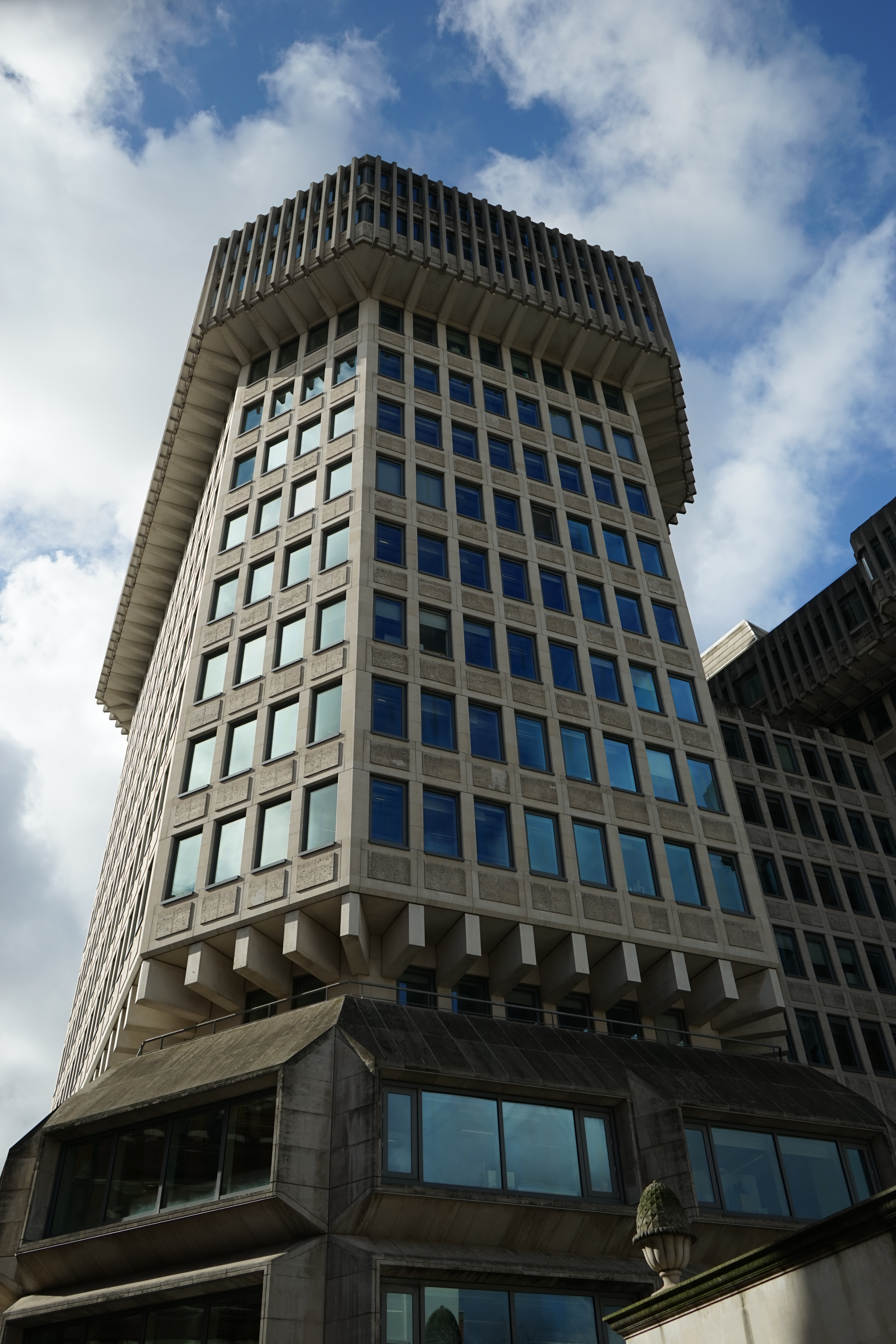
The Home Office building where Cameron worked during the 1990s

After Lamont was sacked, Cameron remained at the Treasury for less than a month before being specifically recruited by Home Secretary Michael Howard. It was commented that he was still "very much in favour" and it was later reported that many at the Treasury would have preferred Cameron to carry on. At the beginning of September 1993, he applied to go on Conservative Central Office's list of prospective parliamentary candidates (PPCs).

Cameron was much more socially liberal than Howard but enjoyed working for him. According to Derek Lewis, then Director-General of Her Majesty's Prison Service, Cameron showed him a "his and her list" of proposals made by Howard and his wife, Sandra. Lewis said that Sandra Howard's list included reducing the quality of prison food, although she denied this claim. Lewis reported that Cameron was "uncomfortable" about the list. In defending Sandra Howard and insisting that she made no such proposal, the journalist Bruce Anderson wrote that Cameron had proposed a much shorter definition on prison catering which revolved around the phrase "balanced diet", and that Lewis had written thanking Cameron for a valuable contribution.

During his work for Howard, Cameron often briefed the media. In March 1994, someone leaked to the press that the Labour Party had called for a meeting with John Major to discuss a consensus on the Prevention of Terrorism Act. After an inquiry failed to find the source of the leak, Labour MP Peter Mandelson demanded assurance from Howard that Cameron had not been responsible, which Howard gave. A senior Home Office civil servant noted the influence of Howard's Special Advisers, saying previous incumbents "would listen to the evidence before making a decision. Howard just talks to young public school gentlemen from the party headquarters."

=== Carlton ===
In July 1994 Cameron left his role as Special Adviser to work as the Director of Corporate Affairs at Carlton Communications. Carlton, which had won the ITV franchise for London weekdays in 1991, was a growing media company which also had film-distribution and video-producing arms. Cameron was suggested for the role to Carlton executive chairman Michael P. Green by his later mother-in-law Lady Astor. He left Carlton in 1997 to run for Parliament, returning to his job after his defeat.

In 1997 Cameron played up the company's prospects for digital terrestrial television, for which it joined with ITV Granada and Sky to form British Digital Broadcasting. In a roundtable discussion on the future of broadcasting in 1998, he criticised the effect of overlapping different regulators on the industry. Carlton's consortium did win the digital terrestrial franchise, but the resulting company suffered difficulties in attracting subscribers. Cameron resigned as Director of Corporate Affairs in February 2001 to run for Parliament for a second time, although he remained on the payroll as a consultant.

=== Parliamentary candidacies ===
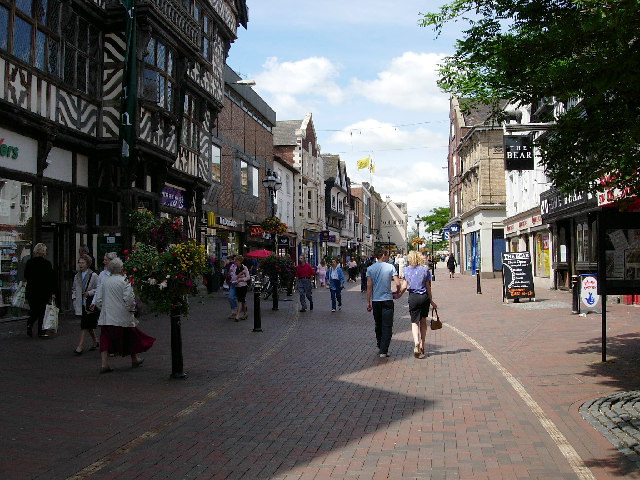
Stafford, the constituency Cameron contested at the 1997 general election

Having been approved for the PPCs' list, Cameron began looking for a seat to contest for the 1997 general election. He was reported to have missed out on selection for Ashford in December 1994, after failing to get to the selection meeting as a result of train delays. In January 1996, when two shortlisted contenders dropped out, Cameron was interviewed and subsequently selected for Stafford, a constituency revised in boundary changes, which was projected to have a Conservative majority. The incumbent Conservative MP, Bill Cash, ran instead in the neighbouring constituency of Stone, where he was re-elected. At the 1996 Conservative Party Conference, Cameron called for tax cuts in the forthcoming Budget to be targeted at the low-paid and to "small businesses where people took money out of their own pockets to put into companies to keep them going". He also said the Party "should be proud of the Tory tax record but that people needed reminding of its achievements ... It's time to return to our tax-cutting agenda. The socialist prime ministers of Europe have endorsed Tony Blair because they want a federal pussy cat and not a British lion."

When writing his election address, Cameron made his own opposition to British membership of the single European currency clear, pledging not to support it. This was a break with official Conservative policy, but about 200 other candidates were making similar declarations. Otherwise, Cameron kept closely to the national party line. He also campaigned using the claim that a Labour government would increase the cost of a pint of beer by 24p; however, the Labour candidate, David Kidney, portrayed Cameron as "a right-wing Tory". Initially, Cameron thought he had a 50/50 chance, but as the campaign wore on and the scale of the impending Conservative defeat grew, Cameron prepared himself for defeat. On election day, Stafford had a swing of 10.7%, almost the same as the national swing, which made it one of the many seats to fall to Labour: Kidney defeated Cameron by 24,606 votes (47.5%) to 20,292 (39.2%), a majority of 4,314 (8.3%).

In the round of selection contests taking place in the run-up to the 2001 general election, Cameron again attempted to be selected for a winnable seat. He tried for the Kensington and Chelsea seat after the death of Alan Clark, but did not make the shortlist. He was in the final two but narrowly lost at Wealden in March 2000, a loss ascribed by Samantha Cameron to his lack of spontaneity when speaking.

Cameron was selected as PPC for Witney in Oxfordshire in April 2000. This had been a safe Conservative seat, but its sitting MP Shaun Woodward (who had worked with Cameron on the 1992 election campaign) had "crossed the floor" to join the Labour Party, and was selected instead for the safe Labour seat of St Helens South. Cameron's biographers Francis Elliott and James Hanning describe the two men as being "on fairly friendly terms". Cameron, advised in his strategy by friend Catherine Fall, put a great deal of effort into "nursing" his potential constituency, turning up at social functions and attacking Woodward for changing his mind on fox hunting to support a ban.

During the election campaign, Cameron accepted the offer of writing a regular column for The Guardian's online section. He won the seat with a 1.9% swing to the Conservatives, taking 22,153 votes (45%) to Labour candidate Michael Bartlet's 14,180 (28.8%), a majority of 7,973 (16.2%).

=== Parliamentary backbencher ===
Upon his election to Parliament, Cameron served as a member of the Commons Home Affairs Select Committee, a prominent appointment for a newly elected MP. He proposed that the Committee launch an inquiry into the law on drugs, and urged the consideration of "radical options". The report recommended a downgrading of ecstasy from Class A to Class B, as well as moves towards a policy of 'harm reduction', which Cameron defended.

Cameron endorsed Iain Duncan Smith in the 2001 Conservative Party leadership election and organised an event in Witney for party supporters to hear John Bercow speaking for him. Two days before Duncan Smith won the leadership contest on 13 September 2001, the 9/11 attacks occurred. Cameron described Tony Blair's response to the attacks as "masterful", saying: "He moved fast, and set the agenda both at home and abroad. He correctly identified the problem of Islamist extremism, the inadequacy of our response both domestically and internationally, and supported—quite rightly in my view—the action to remove the Taliban regime from Afghanistan."

Cameron determinedly attempted to increase his public visibility, offering quotations on matters of public controversy. He opposed the payment of compensation to Gurbux Singh, who had resigned as head of the Commission for Racial Equality after a confrontation with the police; and commented that the Home Affairs Select Committee had taken a long time to discuss whether the phrase "black market" should be used. Cameron was passed over for a front-bench promotion in July 2002. Conservative leader Iain Duncan Smith did invite Cameron and his ally George Osborne to coach him on Prime Minister's Questions in November 2002. The next week, Cameron deliberately abstained in a vote on allowing same-sex and unmarried couples to adopt children jointly, against a whip to oppose; his abstention was noted. The wide scale of abstentions and rebellious votes destabilised the Duncan Smith leadership.

=== Parliamentary frontbencher ===
In June 2003 Cameron was appointed a shadow minister in the Privy Council Office as a deputy to Eric Forth, then shadow leader of the House. He also became a vice-chairman of the Conservative Party when Michael Howard took over the leadership in November of that year. He was appointed Opposition frontbench local government spokesman in 2004, before being promoted to the Shadow Cabinet that June as head of policy co-ordination. Later, he became Shadow Education Secretary in the post-election reshuffle.

Daniel Finkelstein has said of the period leading up to Cameron's election as leader of the Conservative party that "a small group of us (myself, David Cameron, George Osborne, Michael Gove, Nick Boles, Nick Herbert I think, once or twice) used to meet up in the offices of Policy Exchange, eat pizza, and consider the future of the Conservative Party". Cameron's relationship with Osborne is regarded as particularly close; Conservative MP Nadhim Zahawi suggested the closeness of Osborne's relationship with Cameron meant the two effectively shared power during Cameron's time as prime minister. From February 2002 to August 2005, he was a non-executive director of Urbium PLC, operator of the Tiger Tiger bar chain.

== Leader of the Opposition (2005–2010) ==
=== Leadership election ===
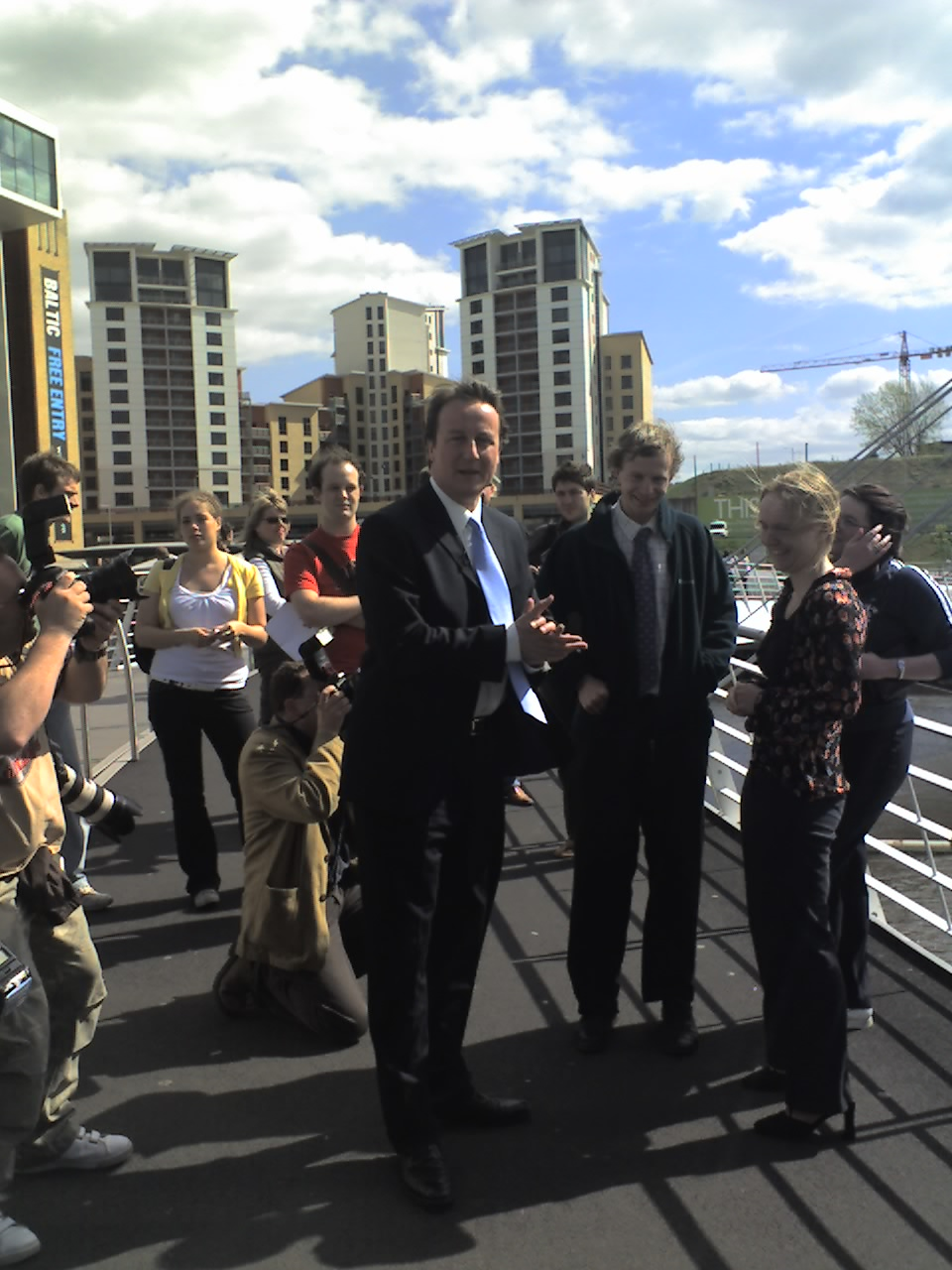
Campaigning in the 2006 local elections at Newcastle upon Tyne on the Gateshead Millennium Bridge

Following the Labour victory in the May 2005 general election, Michael Howard announced his resignation as leader of the Conservative Party and set a lengthy timetable for the leadership election. Cameron announced on 29 September 2005 that he would be a candidate. Parliamentary colleagues supporting him included Boris Johnson, shadow chancellor George Osborne, shadow defence secretary and deputy leader of the party Michael Ancram, Oliver Letwin and former party leader William Hague. His campaign did not gain wide support until his speech, delivered without notes, at the 2005 Conservative party conference. In the speech, he vowed to make people "feel good about being Conservatives again" and said he wanted "to switch on a whole new generation". His speech was well-received; The Daily Telegraph said speaking without notes "showed a sureness and a confidence that is greatly to his credit".

In the first ballot of Conservative MPs on 18 October 2005, Cameron came second, with 56 votes, slightly more than expected; David Davis had fewer than predicted at 62 votes; Liam Fox came third with 42 votes; and Kenneth Clarke was eliminated with 38 votes. In the second ballot on 20 October 2005, Cameron came first with 90 votes; David Davis was second, with 57; and Liam Fox was eliminated with 51 votes. All 198 Conservative MPs voted in both ballots.

The next stage of the election process, between Davis and Cameron, was a vote open to the entire party membership. Cameron was elected with more than twice as many votes as Davis and more than half of all ballots issued; Cameron won 134,446 votes on a 78% turnout, to Davis's 64,398. Although Davis had initially been the favourite, it was widely acknowledged that his candidacy was marred by a disappointing conference speech. Cameron's election as the leader of the Conservative Party and leader of the opposition was announced on 6 December 2005. As is customary for an opposition leader not already a member, upon election Cameron became a member of the Privy Council, being formally approved to join on 14 December 2005, and sworn of the council on 8 March 2006.

=== Reaction to Cameron as Leader ===
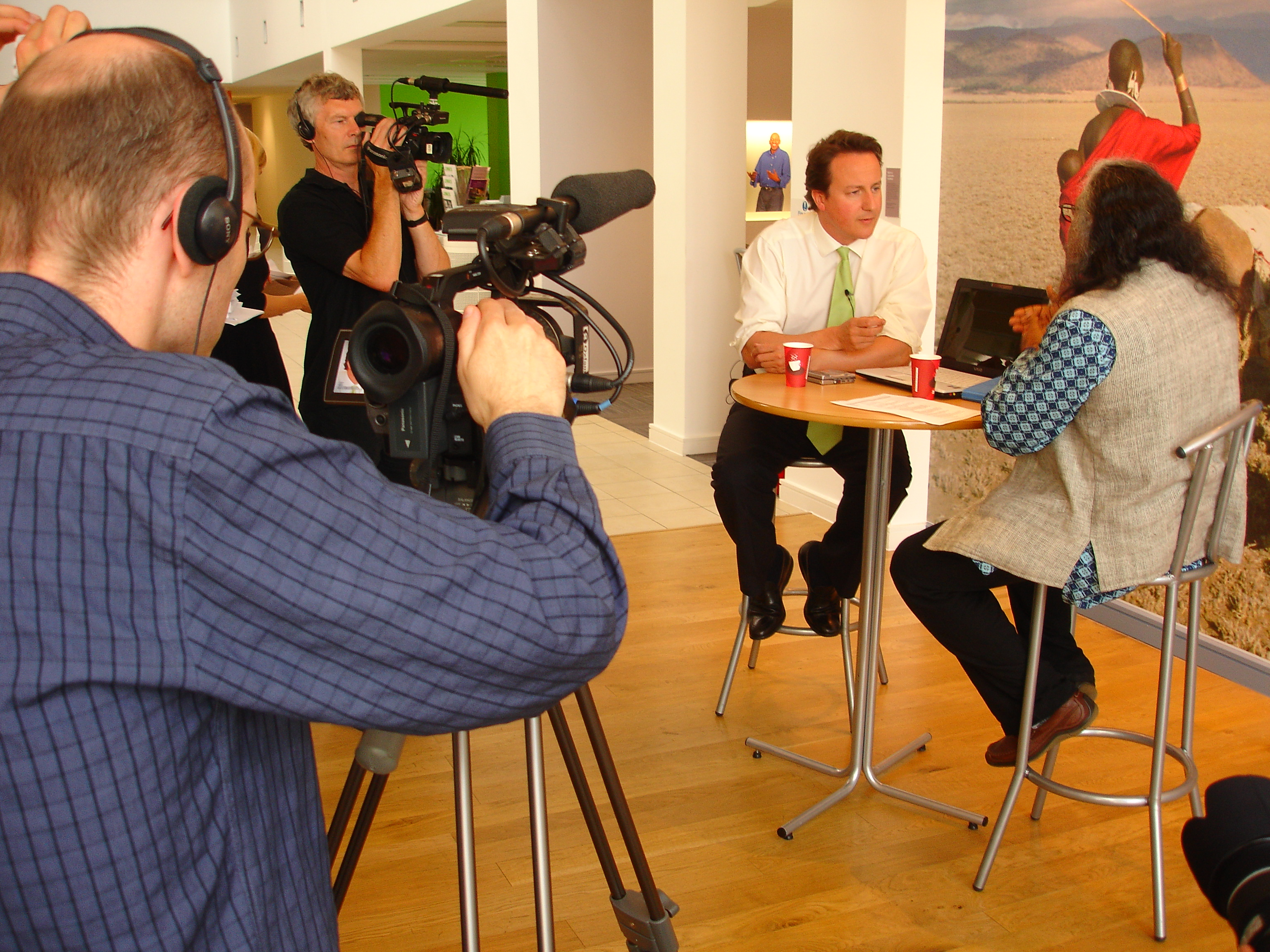
In an interview at the headquarters of Oxfam in 2006

Cameron's relative youth, moderate image, and inexperience before becoming leader invited satirical comparison with Tony Blair. Private Eye soon published a picture of both leaders on its front cover, with the caption "World's first face transplant a success". On the left, the New Statesman unfavourably likened his "new style of politics" to Tony Blair's early leadership years. Cameron was accused of paying excessive attention to appearance: ITV News broadcast footage from the 2006 Conservative Party Conference in Bournemouth showing him wearing four different sets of clothes within a few hours. In his column for The Guardian, comedy writer and broadcaster Charlie Brooker described the Conservative leader as "a hollow Easter egg with no bag of sweets inside" in April 2007.

On the right of the party, Norman Tebbit, a former Conservative chairman, likened Cameron to Pol Pot, "intent on purging even the memory of Thatcherism before building a New Modern Compassionate Green Globally Aware Party". Quentin Davies, who defected from the Conservatives to Labour on 26 June 2007, branded him "superficial, unreliable and [with] an apparent lack of any clear convictions" and stated that Cameron had turned the Conservative Party's mission into a "PR agenda". Traditionalist conservative columnist and author Peter Hitchens wrote: "Mr Cameron has abandoned the last significant difference between his party and the established left", by embracing social liberalism. The Daily Telegraph correspondent and blogger Gerald Warner was particularly scathing about Cameron's leadership, saying that it alienated traditionalist conservative elements from the Conservative Party.

Before he became Conservative leader, Cameron was reportedly known to friends and family as "Dave", though his preference is "David" in public. Labour used the slogan Dave the Chameleon in their 2006 local elections party broadcast to portray Cameron as an ever-changing populist, which was criticised as negative campaigning by the Conservative press, including The Daily Telegraph, though Cameron asserted the broadcast had become his daughter's "favourite video".

=== Allegations of recreational drug use ===
During the leadership election, allegations were made that Cameron had used cannabis and cocaine recreationally before becoming an MP. Pressed on this point during the BBC television programme Question Time, Cameron expressed the view that everybody was allowed to "err and stray" in their past. During his 2005 Conservative leadership campaign, he addressed the question of drug consumption by remarking: "I did lots of things before I came into politics which I shouldn't have done. We all did."

=== Shadow Cabinet appointments ===
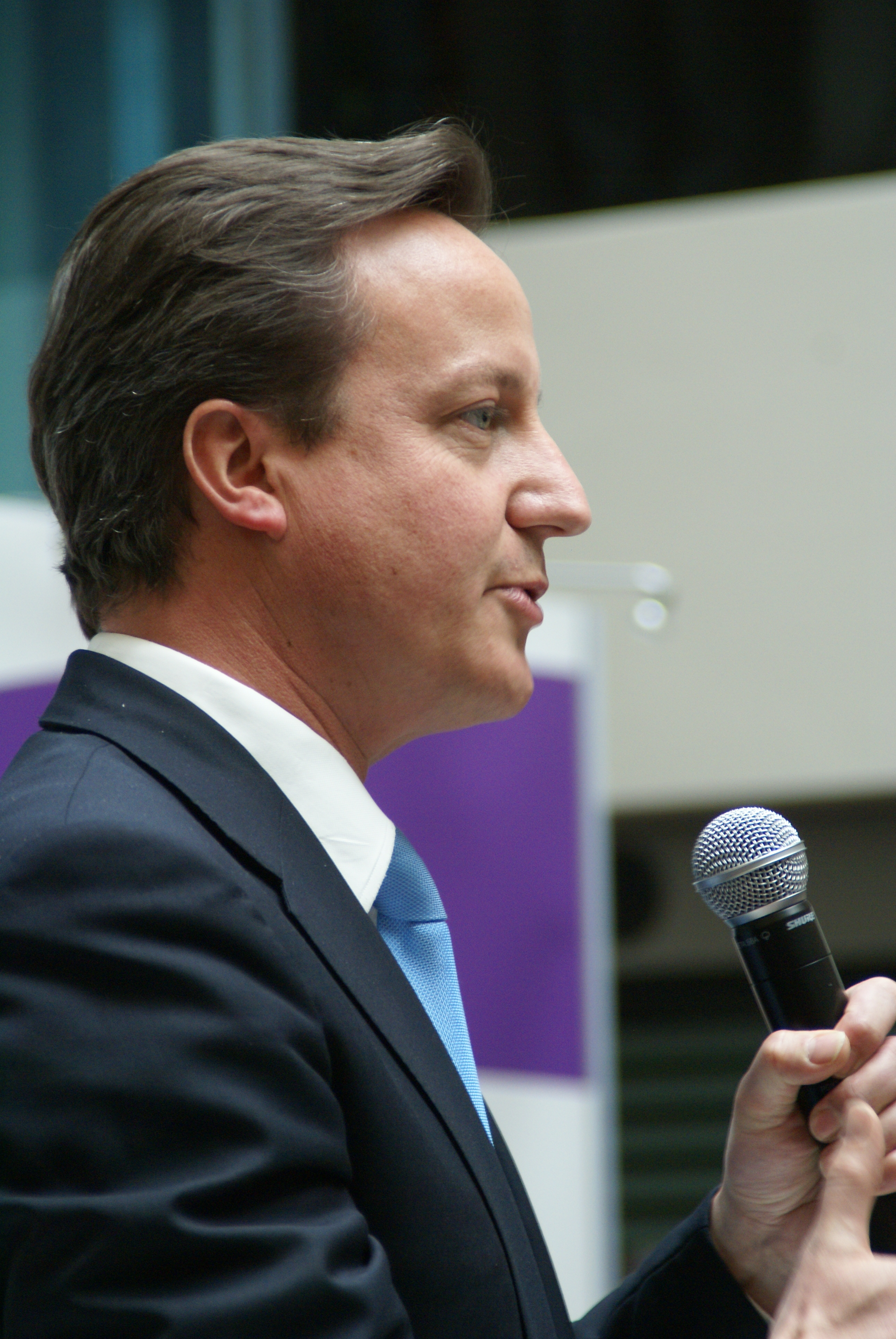
Speaking at the Home Office on 13 May 2010

His Shadow Cabinet appointments included MPs associated with the various wings of the party. Former leader William Hague was appointed to the foreign affairs brief, while both George Osborne and David Davis were retained, as shadow chancellor of the Exchequer and Shadow Home Secretary, respectively. Hague, assisted by Davis, stood in for Cameron during his paternity leave in February 2006. In June 2008 Davis announced his intention to resign as an MP, and was immediately replaced as shadow home secretary by Dominic Grieve; Davis' surprise move was seen as a challenge to the changes introduced under Cameron's leadership.

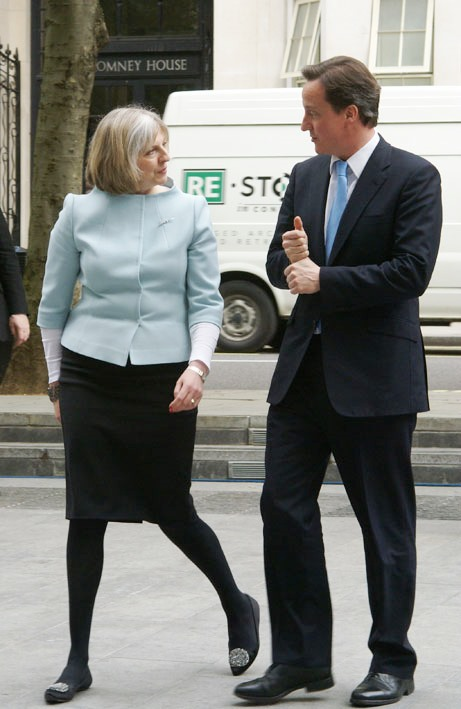
With Theresa May, who was a member of the Shadow Cabinet from 1999 until 2010

A reshuffle of the Shadow Cabinet was undertaken in January 2009, with the chief change being the appointment of former Chancellor of the Exchequer Kenneth Clarke as Shadow Business, Enterprise and Regulatory Reform Secretary. Cameron stated that "With Ken Clarke's arrival, we now have the best economic team." The reshuffle also saw eight other changes made.

=== European Conservatives and Reformists ===
During his successful 2005 campaign to be elected leader of the Conservative Party, Cameron pledged that the Conservative Party's members of the European Parliament would leave the European People's Party group, which had a "federalist" approach to the European Union. Once elected, Cameron began discussions with right-wing and Eurosceptic parties in other European countries, mainly in eastern Europe; in July 2006, he concluded an agreement to form the Movement for European Reform with the Czech Civic Democratic Party, leading to the formation of a new European Parliament group, the European Conservatives and Reformists, in 2009 after the European Parliament elections. Cameron attended a gathering at Warsaw's Palladium cinema celebrating the foundation of the alliance.

In forming the caucus, which had 54 MEPs drawn from eight of the 27 EU member states, Cameron reportedly broke with two decades of Conservative co-operation with the centre-right Christian Democrats, the European People's Party (EPP), on the grounds that they are dominated by European federalists and supporters of the Lisbon treaty. EPP leader Wilfried Martens, former prime minister of Belgium, stated: "Cameron's campaign has been to take his party back to the centre in every policy area with one major exception: Europe. ... I can't understand his tactics. Merkel and Sarkozy will never accept his Euroscepticism."

=== Shortlists for Parliamentary candidates ===
Similarly, Cameron's initial "A-List" of prospective parliamentary candidates was attacked by members of his party, and the policy was discontinued in favour of gender-balanced final shortlists. Before being discontinued, the policy had been criticised by senior Conservative MP and former Prisons Spokeswoman Ann Widdecombe as an "insult to women", and she had accused Cameron of "storing up huge problems for the future".

=== South Africa ===
In April 2009 The Independent reported that in 1989, while Nelson Mandela remained imprisoned under the apartheid regime, Cameron had accepted a trip to South Africa paid for by an anti-sanctions lobby firm. A spokesperson for him responded by saying that the Conservative Party was at that time opposed to sanctions against South Africa and that his trip was a fact-finding mission. However, the newspaper reported that Cameron's then superior at Conservative Research Department called the trip "jolly", saying that "it was all terribly relaxed, just a little treat, a perk of the job. The Botha regime was attempting to make itself look less horrible, but I don't regard it as having been of the faintest political consequence." Cameron distanced himself from his party's history of opposing sanctions against the regime. He was criticised by Labour MP Peter Hain, himself an anti-apartheid campaigner.

=== Raising teaching standards ===
At the launch of the Conservative Party's education manifesto in January 2010, Cameron declared an admiration for the "brazenly elite" approach to education of countries such as Singapore and South Korea, and expressed a desire to "elevate the status of teaching in our country". He suggested the adoption of more stringent criteria for entry to teaching, and offered repayment of the loans of maths and science graduates obtaining first or 2.1 degrees from "good" universities.

Wes Streeting, then president of the National Union of Students, said: "The message that the Conservatives are sending to the majority of students is that if you didn't go to a university attended by members of the Shadow Cabinet, they don't believe you're worth as much."

=== Expenses ===
During the parliamentary expenses scandal in 2009, Cameron said he would lead Conservatives in repaying "excessive" expenses and threatened to expel MPs that refused, after the expense claims of several members of his shadow cabinet had been questioned:

We have to acknowledge just how bad this is, the public are really angry and we have to start by saying, "Look, this system that we have, that we used, that we operated, that we took part in—it was wrong and we are sorry about that".

A day later The Daily Telegraph published figures showing over five years he had claimed £82,450 on his second home allowance. Cameron repaid £680 claimed for repairs to his constituency home. Although he was not accused of breaking any rules, Cameron was placed on the defensive over mortgage interest expense claims covering his constituency home, after a report in The Mail on Sunday suggested he could have reduced the mortgage interest bill by putting an additional £75,000 of his own money towards purchasing the home in Witney, instead of paying off an earlier mortgage on his London home. Cameron said that doing things differently would not have saved the taxpayer any money, as he was paying more on mortgage interest than he was able to reclaim as expenses anyway. He also spoke out in favour of laws giving voters the power to "recall" or "sack" MPs accused of wrongdoing. In April 2014 he was criticised for his handling of the expenses row surrounding Culture Secretary Maria Miller, when he rejected calls from fellow Conservative MPs to sack her from the front bench.

=== 2010 general election ===
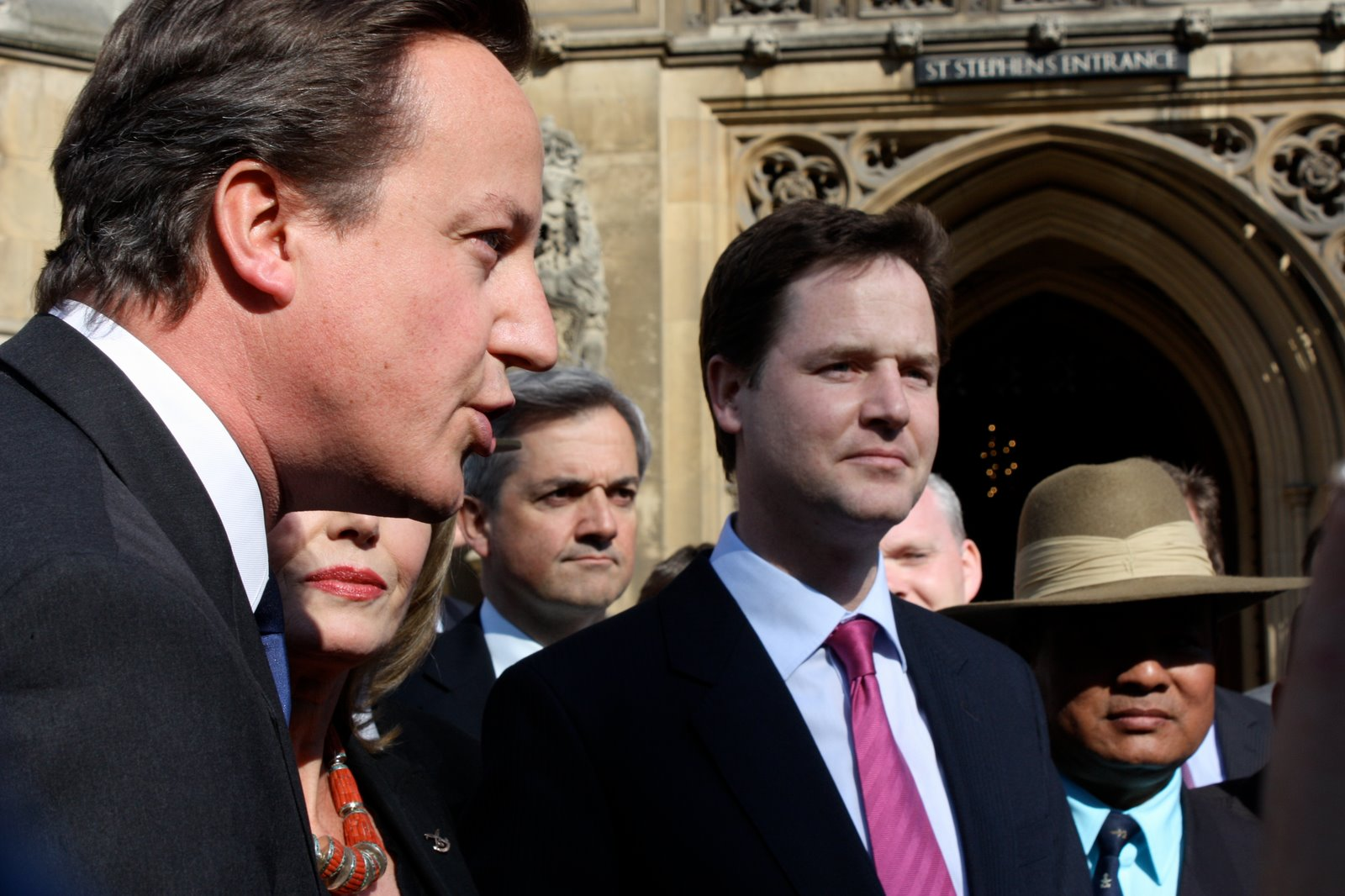
In 2009 as leader of the opposition, with Lib Dem leader Nick Clegg, who later became deputy prime minister, and Lib Dem spokesman Chris Huhne

The Conservatives had last won a general election in 1992. The 2010 general election resulted in the Conservatives, led by Cameron, winning the largest number of seats (306). This was, however, 20 seats short of an overall majority, and resulted in the nation's first hung parliament since February 1974.

==== 2010 government formation ====
Talks between Cameron and then Liberal Democrat leader Nick Clegg led to an agreed Conservative/Liberal Democrat coalition. In late 2009 Cameron had urged the Liberal Democrats to join the Conservatives in a new "national movement", saying there was "barely a cigarette paper" between them on a large number of issues. The invitation was rejected at the time by Clegg who said that the Conservatives were totally different from his party, and that the Lib Dems were the true "progressives" in UK politics.

== Premiership (2010–2016) ==
=== Appointment ===
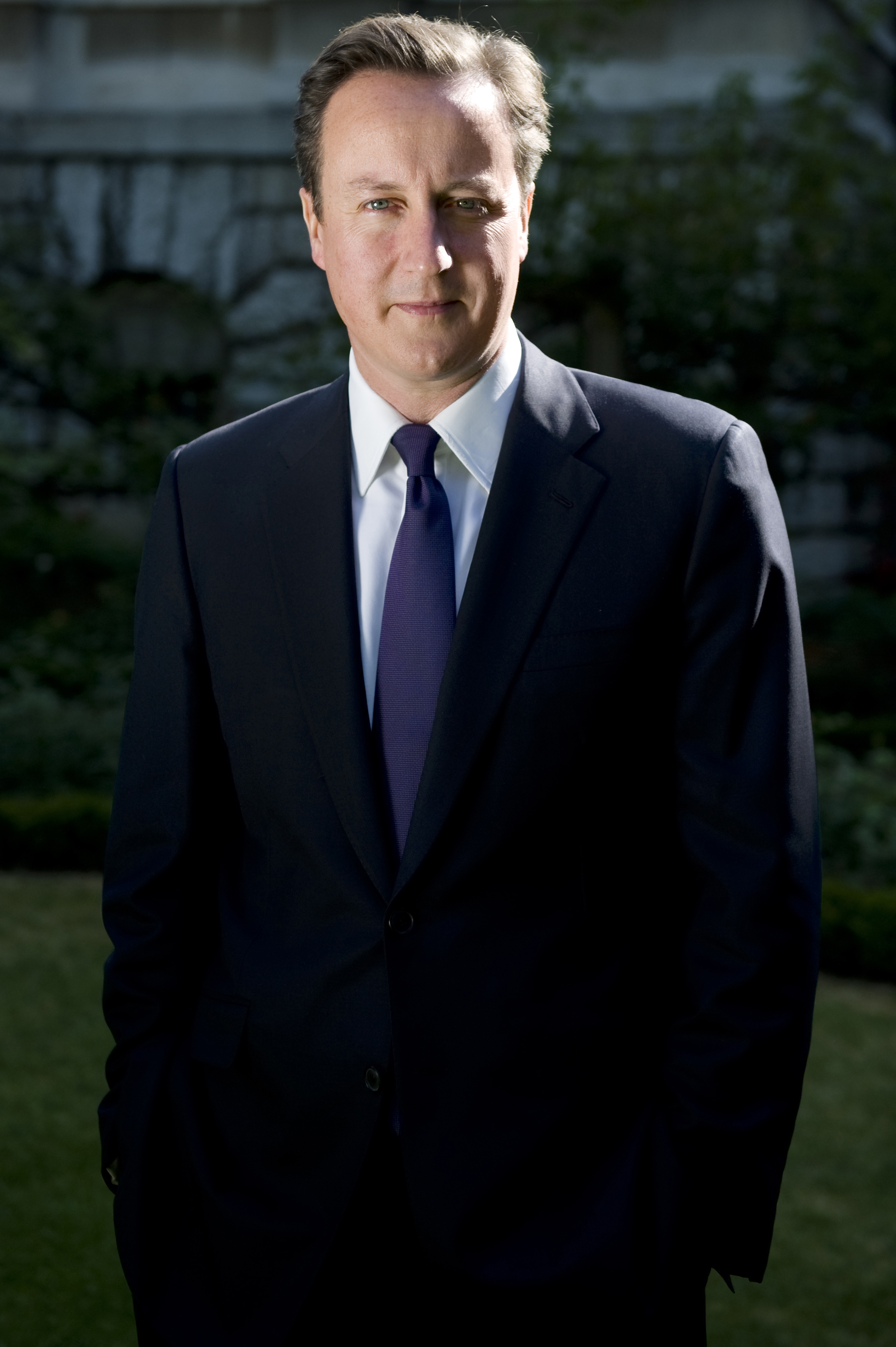
Official portrait, 2010

Elizabeth II, following Gordon Brown's resignation as prime minister on 11 May 2010, extended an invitation to Cameron to establish a new administration based on Brown's recommendation. At age 43, Cameron became the youngest prime minister since Lord Liverpool in 1812, beating the record previously set by Tony Blair in May 1997. In his first address outside 10 Downing Street, he announced his intention to form a coalition government, the first since the Second World War, with the Liberal Democrats.

Nick Clegg and I are both political leaders that want to put aside party differences and work hard for the common good and for the national interest. I believe that is the best way to get the strong government that we need, decisive government that we need today. This is going to be hard and difficult work. A coalition will throw up all sorts of challenges. But I believe together we can provide that strong and stable government that our country needs based on those values – rebuilding family, rebuilding community, above all, rebuilding responsibility in our country.

— David Cameron during his first speech as prime minister, 12 May 2010

Cameron outlined how he intended to "put aside party differences and work hard for the common good and for the national interest". As one of his first moves Cameron appointed Nick Clegg, the leader of the Liberal Democrats, as deputy prime minister on 11 May 2010. Between them, the Conservatives and Liberal Democrats controlled 363 seats in the House of Commons, giving them a comfortable majority of 76 seats.

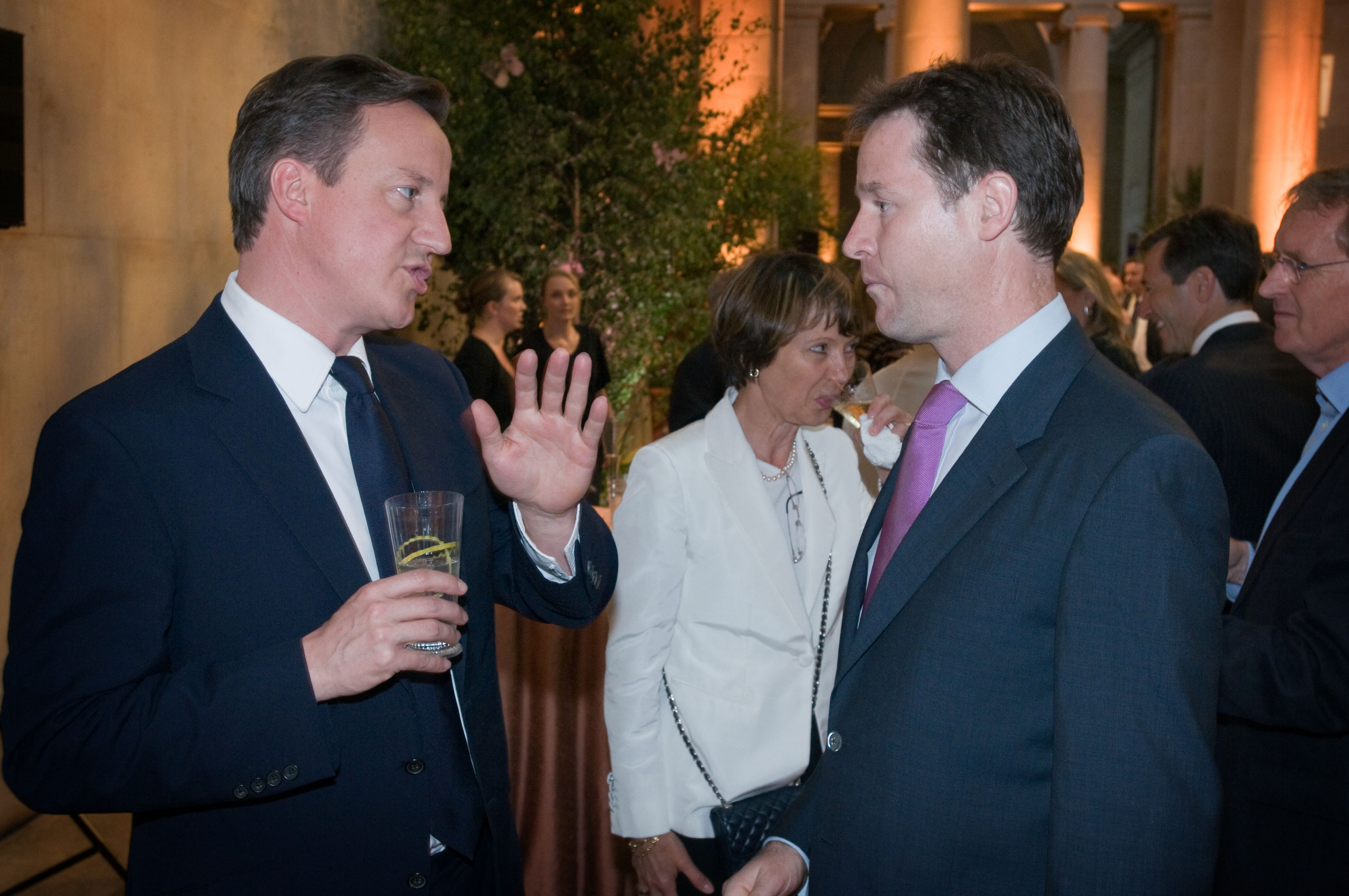
With Clegg in 2010 after entering government

In June 2010, Cameron described the economic situation as he came to power as "even worse than we thought" and warned of "difficult decisions" to be made over spending cuts. By the beginning of 2015, he was able to claim that his government's austerity programme had succeeded in halving the budget deficit, although as a percentage of GDP rather than in cash terms.

In December 2010, Cameron attended a meeting with FIFA vice-president Chung Mong-joon, in which a vote-trading deal for the right to host the 2018 World Cup in England was discussed.

=== Domestic affairs ===
==== Welfare and benefits ====
Upon entering office in May 2010, Cameron positioned social reform as integral to his government's broader ambition to tackle poverty and restore social responsibility. He promoted a "life chances" agenda that framed poverty not only in material terms, but in terms of a lack of opportunity and generational disadvantage. The government announced its intention to adopt a "lifecycle approach" targeting family life, education, mental health and addiction through coordinated interventions across those domains.

Cameron extended reforms into broader public services through the "Big Society" agenda. A 2011 white paper proposed opening schools, hospitals, and council-run services to non‑public providers under "payment‑by‑results" contracts, with aims of improving efficiency and innovation through increased choice and competition. In December 2015, due to sustained concern over failing children's services, Cameron announced that persistently underperforming local authorities would be required to transfer services to high‑performing councils, independent charities, or spin‑out organisations—a structural reform intended to improve outcomes and accountability. Cameron's government also enacted welfare reforms, including the introduction of Universal Credit and the so‐called "bedroom tax", aimed at reducing welfare spending and encouraging labour market participation. These reforms were linked in academic studies to negative social outcomes—such as increased crime and welfare losses in deprived areas—even beyond fiscal savings.

Cameron's government in May 2016 directed reforms specifically for social workers and those leaving care. Legislation envisaged a statutory care‑leaver covenant obliging local authorities to provide detailed entitlements up to age 25 in areas such as housing, employment, and health support. Additionally, mandatory mentoring for care‑leavers and a shift in the balance of decision‑making to favor adoption over temporary foster placements were introduced to promote stability for vulnerable children.

==== Constitutional referendums ====
As a part of the deal to enter into coalition with the Liberal Democrats, the Conservatives pledged to hold a referendum on a 2011 alternative voting system. The referendum was held in May 2011 and proposed replacing the current first-past-the-post voting system with an alternative voting system, it was defeated at the polls and later became a catalyst for the fall of the Liberal Democrats. Cameron agreed to holding the 2014 Scottish independence referendum and eliminated the "devomax" option from the ballot for a straight out yes or no vote. His support for the successful Better Together campaign extended to making a successful request to the Queen to intervene. He had also backed a successful campaign to retain the status quo in a referendum on changing the voting system, held at the request of his coalition partners. The 2016 referendum on the UK's membership of the European Union meant that his tenure as British prime minister saw an unprecedented three referendums on the UK's constitutional future.

==== Social reforms ====
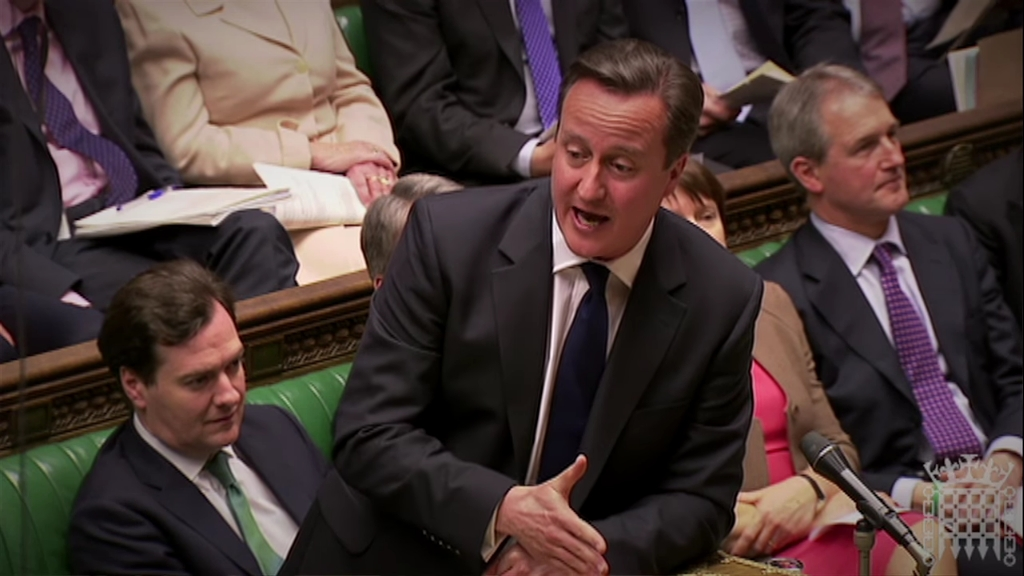
At Prime Minister's Questions in 2012

Cameron supported the introduction of gay marriage, despite more of his own Conservative MPs voting against the move than for it, meaning the support of Lib Dem MPs in government and Labour MPs in opposition was required to allow it to pass. Earlier in his term, he had managed to secure a huge majority for UK participation in UN-backed military action in Libya, but Cameron became the first prime minister since 1782 to lose a foreign policy vote in the House of Commons over proposed military action against Bashar al-Assad's regime in Syria. Subsequently, Barack Obama asked congressional approval, which was not ultimately granted.

==== Education ====
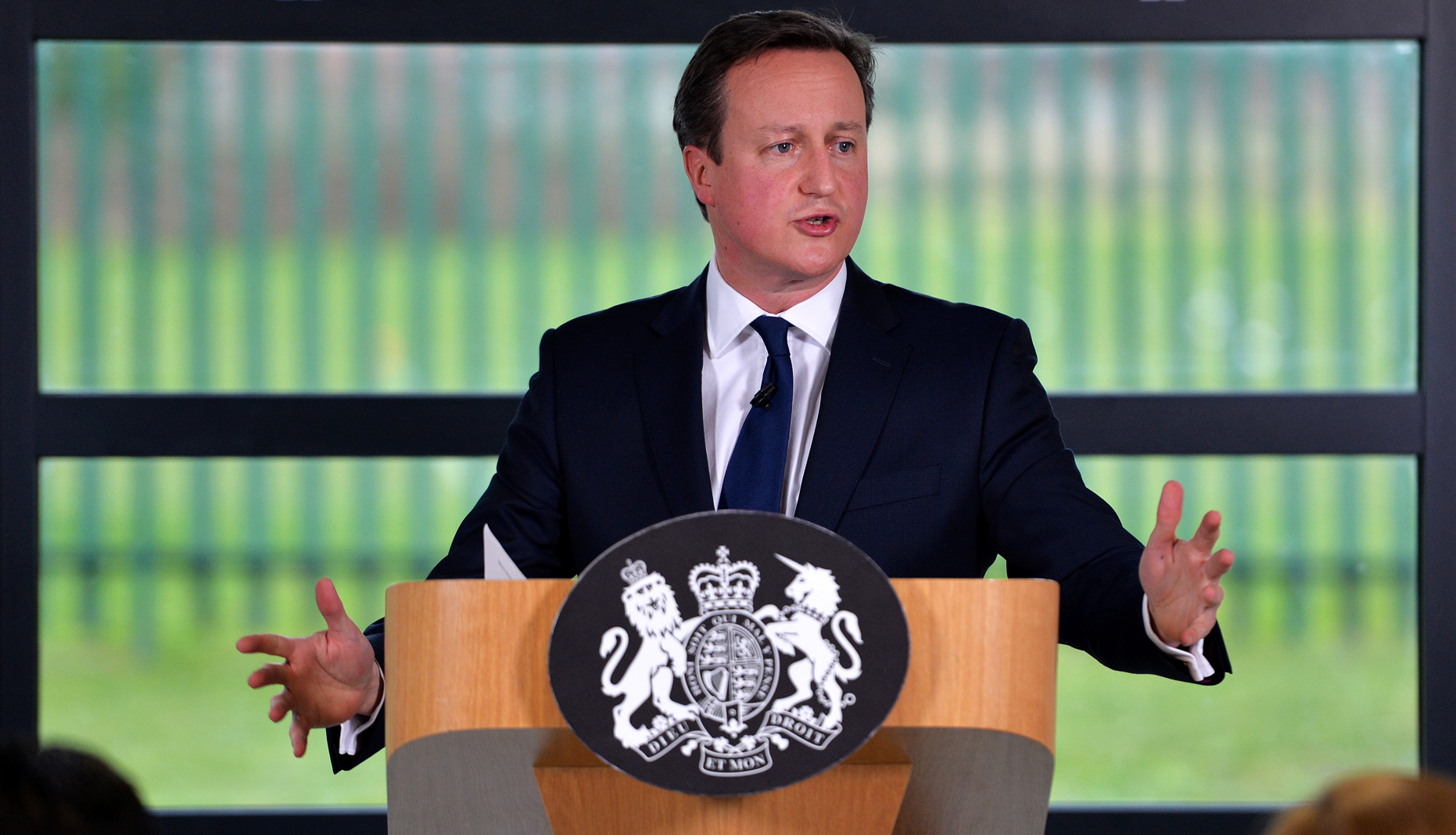
Cameron announcing the approval of more free schools across the country as a part of his education policy in March 2015

Cameron advocated a substantial expansion of academy and free school provision in England, positioning them as central to improving standards. From May 2010 to mid‑2014, the number of academies soared from 203 to over 4,600, with more than half of secondary schools operating under academy status by mid‑2013. He pledged to open at least 500 additional free schools by 2020, aiming to create around 270,000 new places, and announced the launch of 31 free schools in mid‑2016 alone, offering approximately 20,000 extra places.

Under Cameron's government, the national curriculum underwent revision to make it more challenging for state schools embedding early exposure to subjects such as computing, advanced mathematics, geography and history thinking from age five onwards. In December 2014, his government launched a £67 million initiative to retrain approximately 15,000 teachers in STEM subjects, and offered bursaries to attract top university graduates in maths and physics into teaching roles. Parallel to this were proposals for a National Teaching Service designed to deploy high‑quality educators to poorly performing schools, and expanded powers for regional school commissioners to intervene swiftly in inadequately rated schools.

Cameron introduced the pupil premium in 2011, allocating additional per-pupil funding to schools serving students eligible for free school meals. The aim was to mitigate socioeconomic disparities by directing more resources to disadvantaged pupils, supporting social mobility through enhanced educational opportunity.

==== Economy ====
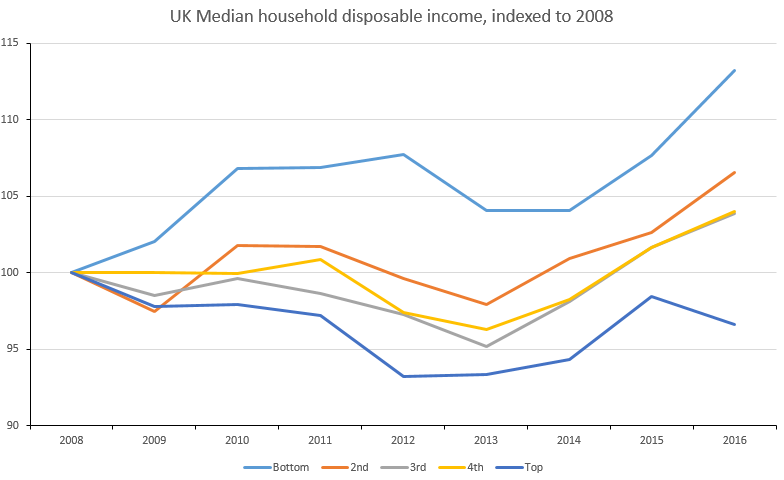
UK median household disposable income by income group for 2008–2016, indexed to 2008

In response to the Great Recession, Cameron undertook the austerity programme. This was presented by the Cameron administration as deficit reduction programme consisting of sustained reductions in public spending, which the government argued would reduce the government budget deficit and the welfare state in the United Kingdom. The National Health Service and education were "ringfenced" and protected from direct spending cuts. Cameron and Chancellor George Osborne claimed they aimed to eliminate the structural deficit (i.e. deficit on current spending as opposed to investment), and to have government debt falling as a percentage of GDP. By 2015 the deficit as a percentage of GDP had reduced to half what it was in 2010.

Cameron jointly with Osborne, introduced an austerity‑based fiscal strategy which they claimed was aiming to sharply reduce the public deficit that had ballooned in the wake of the 2008 financial crisis. The programme relied primarily on reductions in public spending—approximately 5% of GDP over the coalition period—while protecting day‑to‑day budgets for the NHS, education, and international development. Tax reforms accompanied spending cuts, including a VAT rise from 17.5% to 20%, increased National Insurance contributions, alongside reductions in the higher rate of income tax (from 50% to 45%) and corporation tax cuts from 28% to 19%. By 2015, the structural deficit as a percentage of GDP had roughly halved relative to 2010.

Between 2010 and mid-2015, unemployment fell from around 7.9% to about 5.5% as employment expanded by roughly 2.45 million jobs. Economic growth remained modest, often described as sluggish, with GDP growth rates of around 0.4–0.8 % in the later years of the coalition. While the deficit declined, national debt rose from circa 71% of GDP in 2010 to approximately 84% by 2016. Critics and some economic commentators have argued that austerity slowed recovery and constrained growth — illustrating the risk of premature fiscal tightening in a weak economy.

=== Immigration ===
Cameron said immigration from outside the EU should be subject to annual limits. He said in July 2013 that "in the last decade we have had an immigration policy that's completely lax. The pressure it puts on our public services and communities is too great." In 2015 The Independent reported: "The Conservatives have failed spectacularly to deliver their pledge to reduce net migration to less than 100,000 a year. The Office for National Statistics (ONS) announced a net flow of 298,000 migrants to the UK in the 12 months to September 2014—up from 210,000 in the previous year."

=== Defence and foreign affairs ===
==== Defence cuts ====
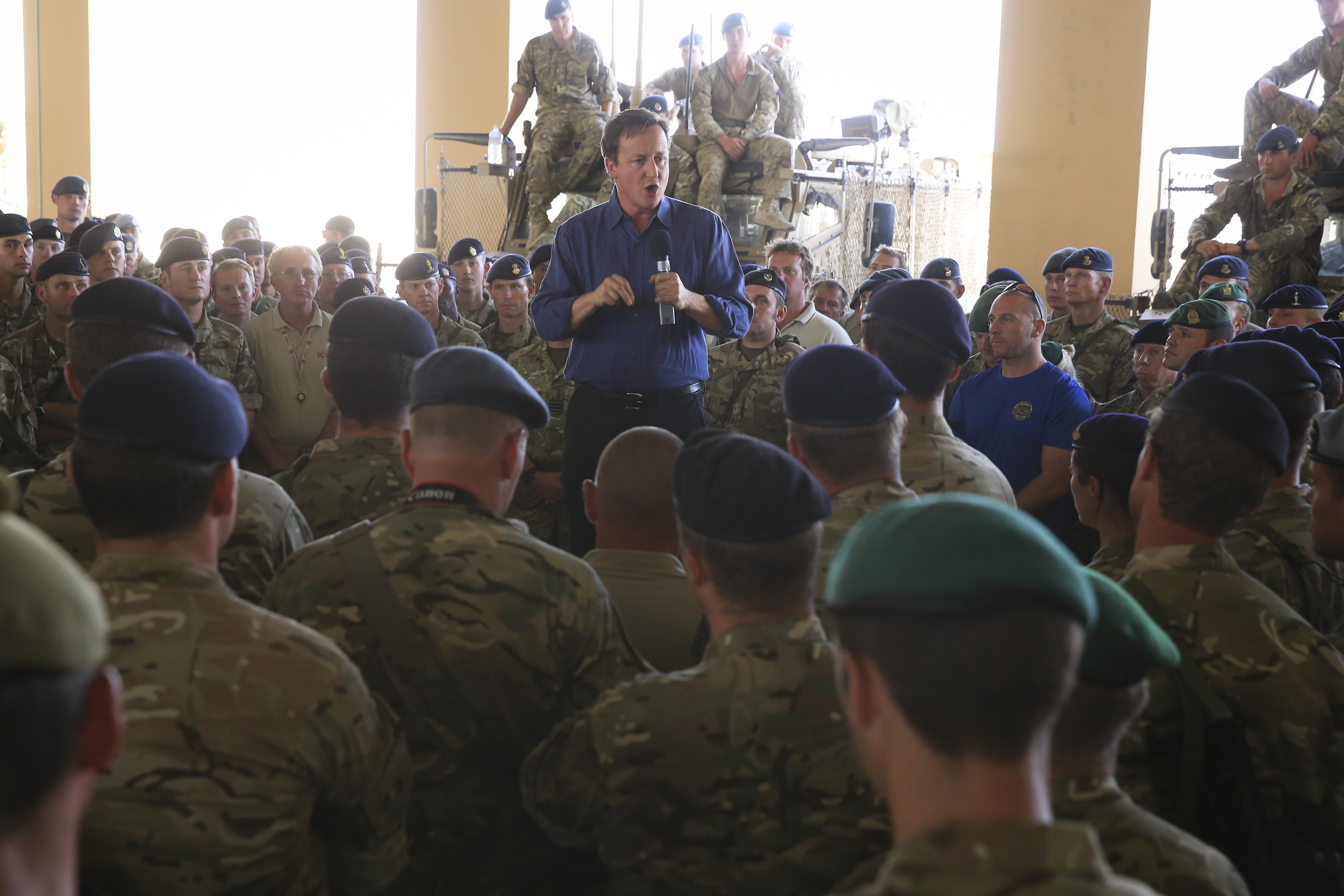
Visiting British troops in Afghanistan, October 2014

In 2014 Cameron dismissed warnings that his cuts to the UK defence budget had left it less than a "first class-player in terms of defence" and no longer a "full partner" to the United States.

In the July 2015 budget, Chancellor George Osborne announced that the UK defence spending would meet the NATO target of 2% of GDP.

==== NATO military intervention in Libya ====
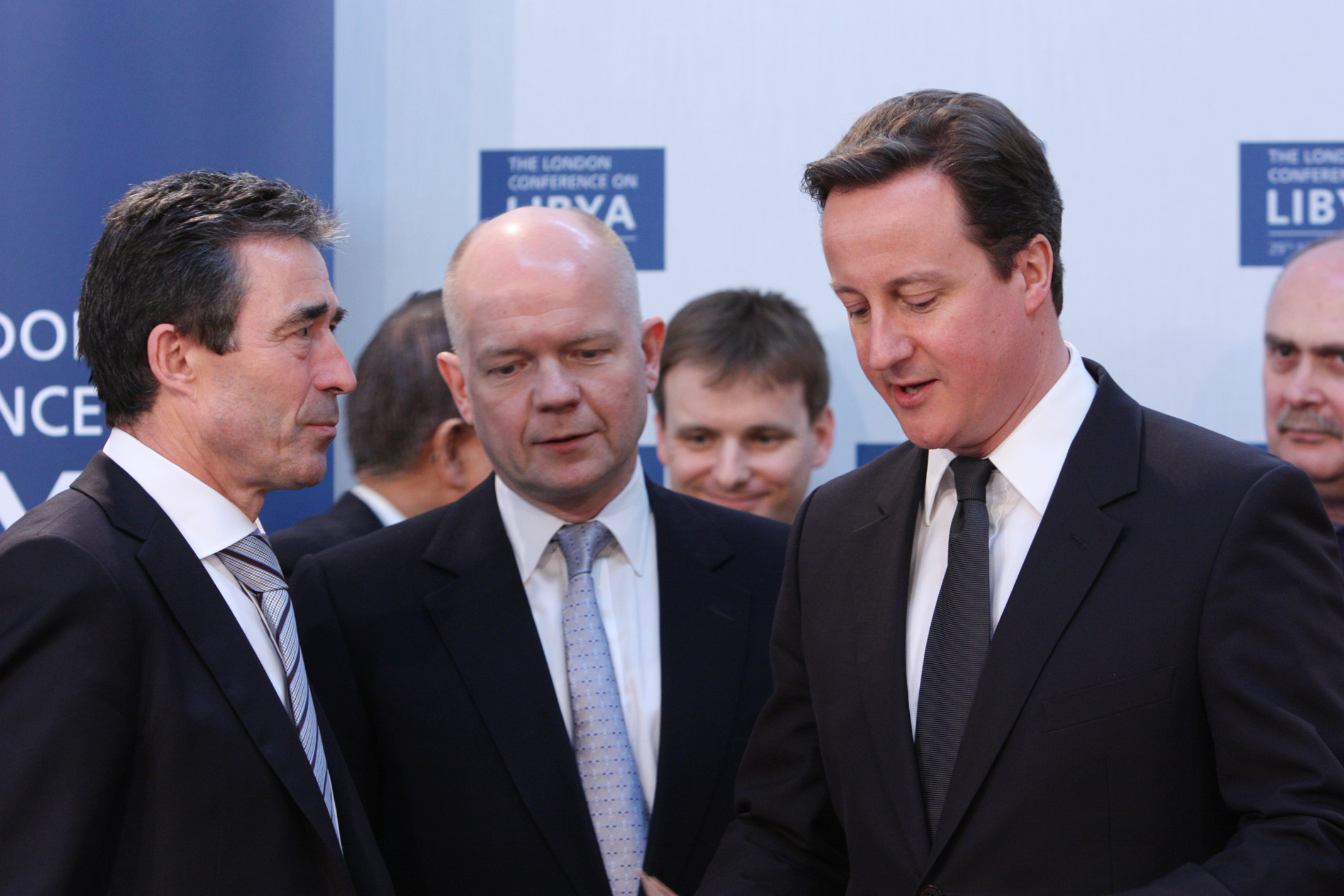
With then Foreign Secretary William Hague speaking to NATO Secretary General Anders Fogh Rasmussen (left) at the London Conference on Libya, March 2011

Cameron condemned the violence used against anti-Gaddafi protesters at the beginning of the Libyan Civil War After weeks of lobbying by the UK and its allies, on 17 March 2011, the United Nations Security Council approved a no-fly zone to prevent government forces loyal to Muammar Gaddafi from carrying out air attacks on anti-Gaddafi rebels. Two days later, the UK and the United States fired more than 110 Tomahawk missiles at targets in Libya.

Cameron said he was "proud" of the role United Kingdom played in the overthrow of Gaddafi's government. Cameron also stated that UK had played a "very important role", adding that "a lot of people said that Tripoli was completely different to Benghazi and that the two don't get on—they were wrong. ... People who said 'this is all going to be an enormous swamp of Islamists and extremists'—they were wrong".

In 2015 through 2016 the Foreign Affairs Select Committee conducted an extensive and highly critical inquiry into the British involvement in the civil war. It concluded that the early threat to civilians had been overstated, and that the significant Islamist element in the rebel forces had not been recognised, due to an intelligence failure. By mid-2011, the initial limited intervention to protect Libyan civilians had become a policy of regime change. However, that new policy did not include proper support for a new government, leading to a political and economic collapse in Libya, and the growth of ISIL in North Africa. It concluded that Cameron was ultimately responsible for this British policy failure.

US president Barack Obama also acknowledged there had been issues with following up the conflict planning, commenting in an interview with The Atlantic that Cameron had allowed himself to be "distracted by a range of other things".

==== Falklands ====
In 2013 in response to Argentina's calls for negotiations over the Falkland Islands' sovereignty, a referendum was called, asking Falkland Islanders whether they supported the continuation of their status as an Overseas Territory of the United Kingdom. With a turnout of 91.94%, an overwhelming 99.8% voted to remain a British territory, with only three votes against. In light of this, Cameron said: "We believe in the Falkland islanders' right to self-determination. They had a referendum. They couldn't have been more clear about wanting to remain with our country and we should protect and defend them".

==== Saudi Arabia ====
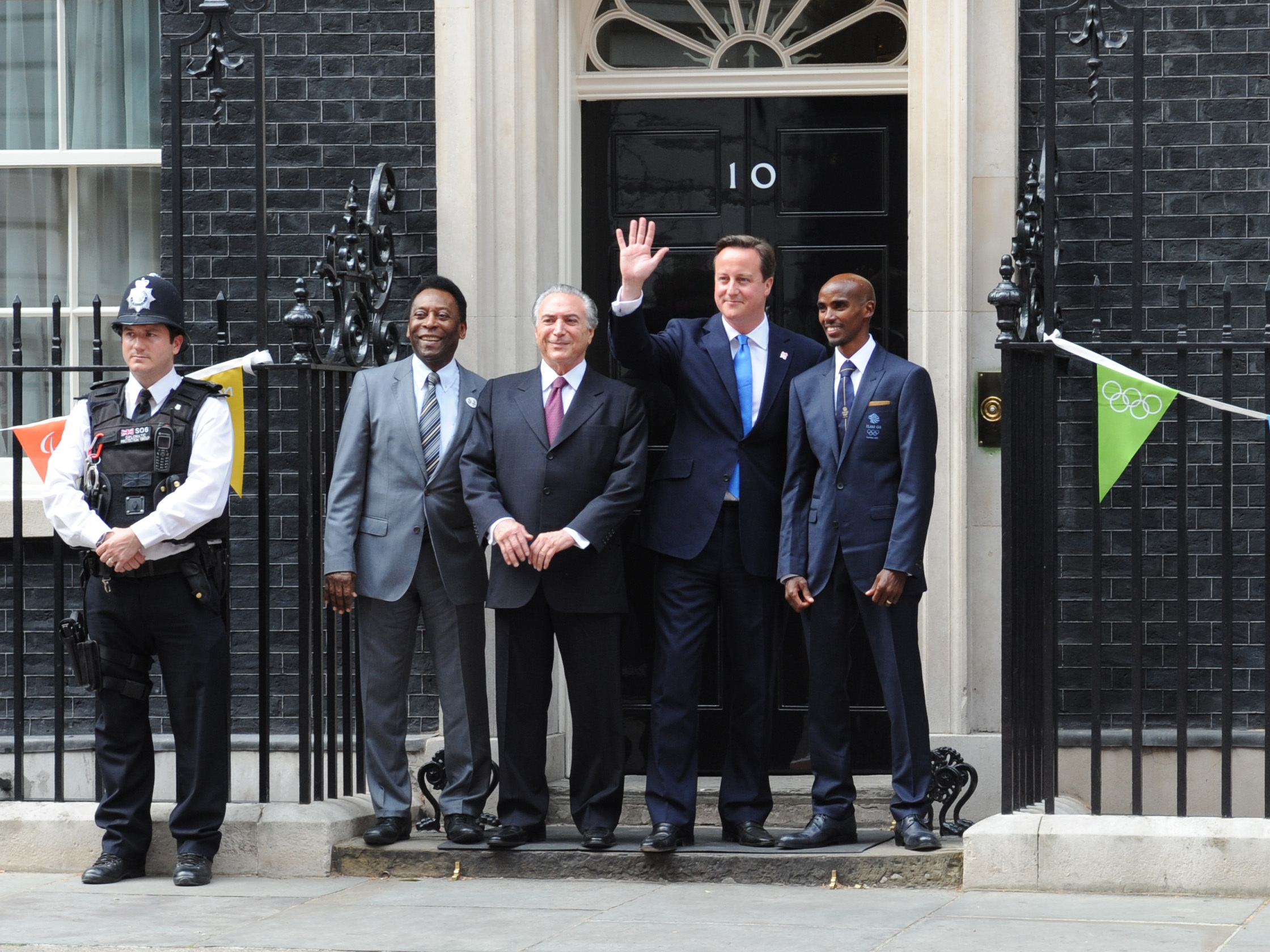
Hosting a hunger summit in 2012, with Pelé (second left) and Mo Farah (right) outside 10 Downing Street

Cameron supported Britain's close relationship with Saudi Arabia. In January 2015 he travelled to the Saudi capital Riyadh to pay his respects, following the death of the nation's King Abdullah. According to WikiLeaks, Cameron initiated a secret deal with Saudi Arabia, ensuring both countries were elected onto the UN Human Rights Council. The same year his government announced "firm political support" for the Saudi Arabian-led intervention in Yemen against the Shi'a Houthis, re-supplying the Saudi military with weapons and providing them with training.

==== Sri Lanka ====
Cameron reiterated calls for an independent investigation into the alleged war crimes during the final stages of the Sri Lankan Civil War. "There needs to be proper inquiries into what happened at the end of the war, there needs to be proper human rights, democracy for the Tamil minority in that country" Cameron stated. He stated that, if this investigation was not completed by March 2014, he would press for an independent international inquiry. This followed a visit to Jaffna, a war-ravaged town in the northern part of Sri Lanka; Cameron was the first foreign leader to visit Jaffna since the island once colonised by Britain became independent in 1948. Cameron was mobbed by demonstrators, mostly women, seeking his assistance in tracing missing relatives.

==== Turkey ====
In a speech in Ankara in July 2010, Cameron stated unequivocally his support for Turkey's accession to the EU, citing economic, security and political considerations, and claimed that those who opposed Turkish membership were driven by "protectionism, narrow nationalism or prejudice". In that speech, he was also critical of Israeli action during the Gaza flotilla raid – which had killed nine Turkish activists – and its Gaza policy, and repeated his opinion that Israel had turned Gaza into a "prison camp", having previously referred to Gaza as "a giant open prison". These views were met with mixed reactions. The Cameron government declined to formally recognise the Ottoman Empire's massacres of Armenians as a "genocide".

During the EU referendum campaign, Cameron stated that Turkey was unlikely to be ready to join the EU "until the year 3000", at its current rate of progress.

==== Israel ====
At the end of May 2011 Cameron stepped down as patron of the Jewish National Fund, becoming the first British prime minister not to be patron of the charity in the 110 years of its existence.

In a speech in 2011, Cameron said: "You have a prime minister whose commitment and determination to work for peace in Israel is deep and strong. Britain will continue to push for peace, but will always stand up for Israel against those who wish her harm". He said he wanted to reaffirm his "unshakable" belief in Israel within the same message. He also voiced his opposition to the Goldstone Report, claiming it had been biased against Israel and not enough blame had been placed on Hamas.

In March 2014, during his first visit to Israel as prime minister, Cameron addressed Israel's Knesset in Jerusalem, where he offered his full support for peace efforts between Israelis and Palestinians, hoping a two-state solution might be achieved. He also made clear his rejection of trade or academic boycotts against Israel, acknowledged Israel's right to defend its citizens as "a right enshrined in international law", and made note of the Balfour Declaration of 1917, as "the moment when the State of Israel went from a dream to a plan, Britain has played a proud and vital role in helping to secure Israel as a homeland for the Jewish people." During his two-day visit, he met with Israeli prime minister Benjamin Netanyahu and with Palestinian Authority president Mahmoud Abbas. Senior Foreign Office minister Baroness Warsi resigned over the Cameron government's decision not to condemn Israel for the 2014 Israel–Gaza conflict, saying that the government's "approach and language during the current crisis in Gaza is morally indefensible".

==== Military intervention in Iraq and Syria ====
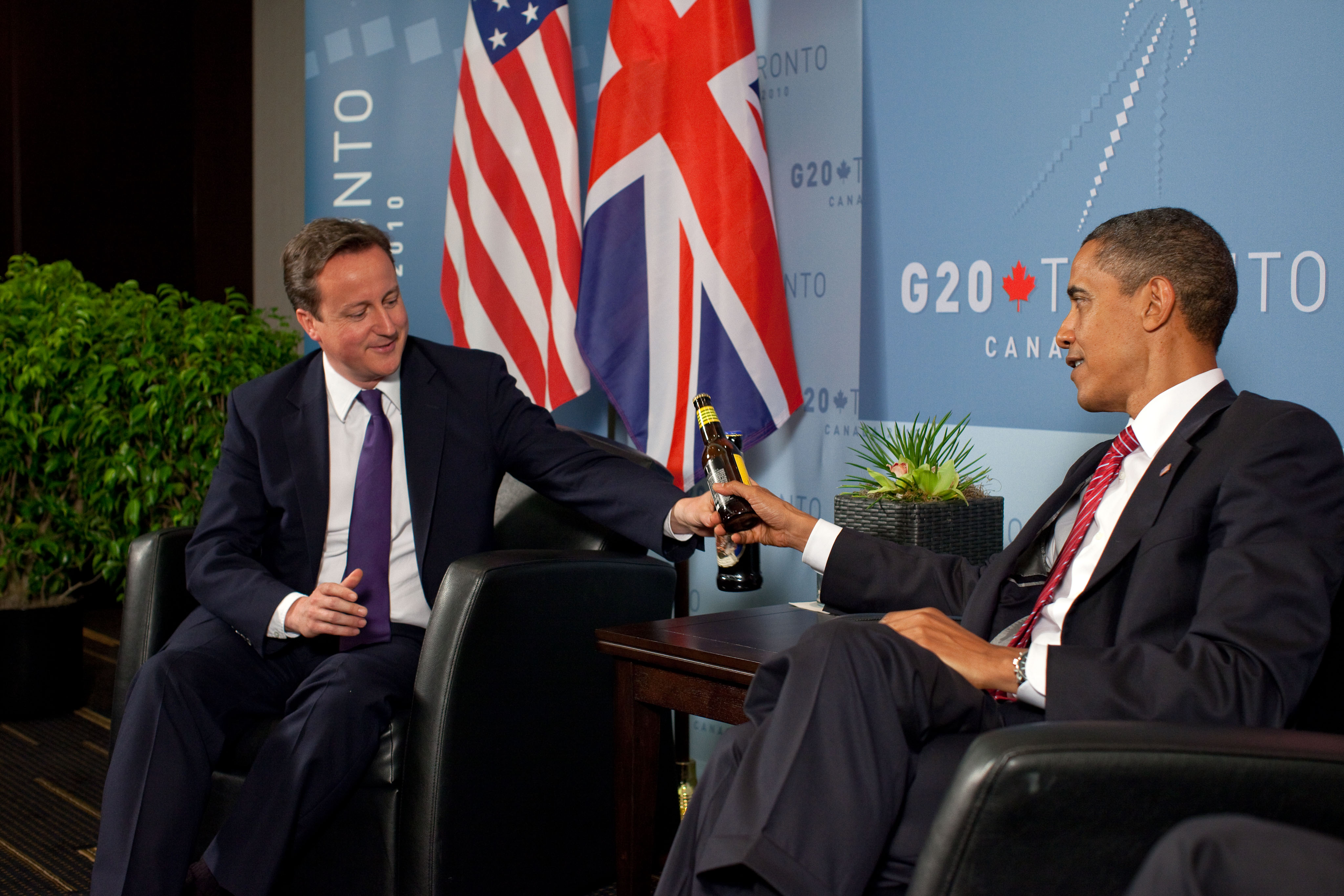
Meeting Barack Obama during the 2010 G20 Toronto summit

In August 2013 Cameron lost a motion in favour of bombing Syrian armed forces in response to the Ghouta chemical attack, becoming the first prime minister to suffer such a foreign-policy defeat since 1782. In September 2014, MPs passed a motion in favour of British planes joining, at the request of the Iraqi government, a bombing campaign against Islamic State (IS) targets in Iraq; the motion explicitly expressed parliament's disapproval of UK military action in Syria. Cameron promised that, before expanding UK air strikes and ground support to include IS units in Syria, he would seek parliamentary approval.

In July 2015 a Freedom of Information (FOI) request by Reprieve revealed that, without the knowledge of UK parliamentarians, RAF pilots had, in fact, been bombing targets in Syria, and that Cameron knew of this. The prime minister, along with Defence Secretary Michael Fallon, faced strong criticism, including from Conservative MPs, for not informing the Commons about this deployment; the Ministry of Defence said that the pilots concerned were "embedded" with foreign military forces, and so were "effectively" operating as such, while Fallon denied that MPs had been, as he put it, "kept in the dark". The Reprieve FoI request also revealed that British drone pilots had been embedded, almost continuously, with American forces at Creech Air Force Base since 2008. These drone operators, who were "a gift of services", meaning the UK still paid their salaries and covered their expenses, had been carrying out operations that included reconnaissance in Syria to assist American strikes against IS.

Fallon said that it was "illogical" for the UK not to bomb ISIL in Syria, for the organisation does not "differentiate between Syria and Iraq" and is "organised and directed and administered from Syria". Following the terrorist attacks on Paris in November 2015, for which Islamic State claimed responsibility, Cameron began pushing for a strategy for the Royal Air Force to bomb Syria in retaliation. Cameron set out his case for military intervention to Parliament on 26 November, telling MPs that it was the only way to guarantee Britain's safety, and would be part of a "comprehensive" strategy to defeat IS. On 3 December 2015, MPs voted 397–223 in favour of launching air strikes against ISIL targets in Syria. The vote for military action was supported by all but seven members of the Parliamentary Conservative Party, as well as 66 Labour MPs who backed the government in defiance of their leader, Jeremy Corbyn, who had expressed his opposition to air strikes.

=== 2015 general election ===
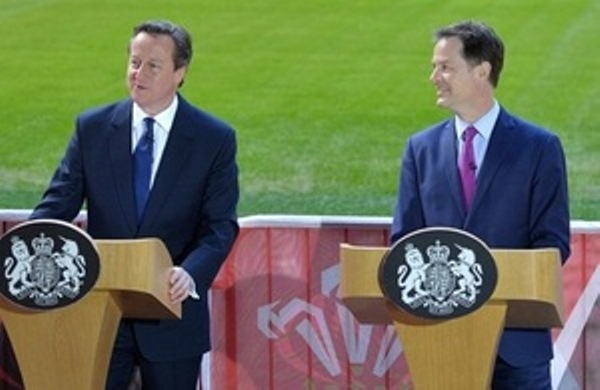
Cameron with Clegg in 2015

Cameron was re-elected UK prime minister on 7 May 2015 with a majority in the Commons. The Conservative Party's decisive victory in the general election was a surprise, as most polls and commentators had suggested the outcome was too close to call and that the result would be a second hung parliament. Cameron said of his first term when returned as prime minister for a second term that he was "proud to lead the first coalition government in 70 years" and offered particular thanks to Clegg for his role in it. Forming the first Conservative majority government elected since 1992, David Cameron became the first prime minister to be re-elected immediately after a full term with a larger popular vote share since Lord Salisbury at the 1900 general election.

In response to the November 2015 Paris attacks, Cameron secured the support of the House of Commons to extend air strikes against ISIS into Syria. Earlier that year, Cameron had outlined a five-year strategy to counter Islamist extremism and subversive teachings.

=== 2016 referendum and resignation ===
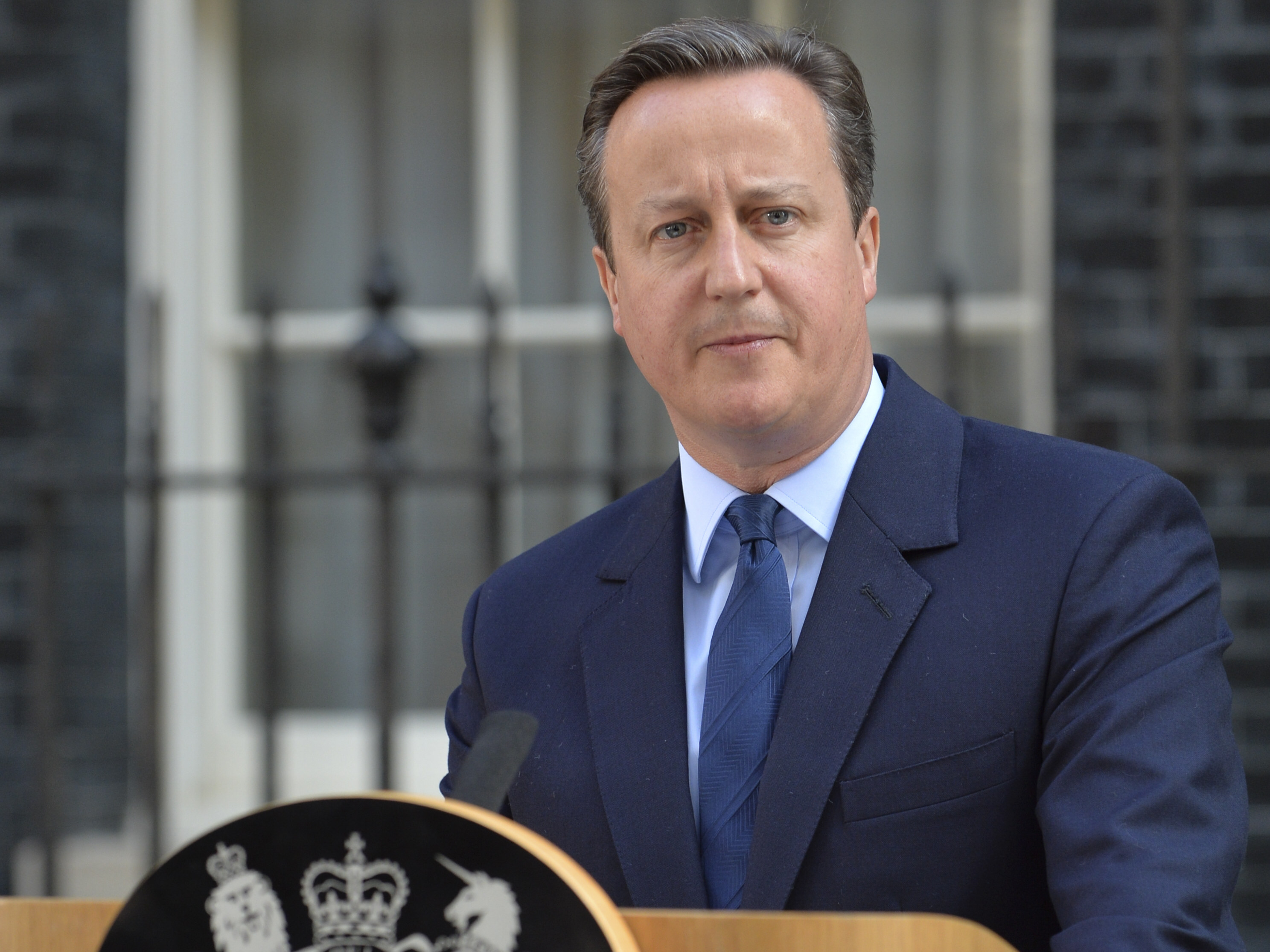
Announcing his resignation as prime minister following the UK vote to leave EU membership, June 2016

As promised in the election manifesto, Cameron set a date for a referendum on whether the UK should remain a member of the European Union, and announced that he would be campaigning for Britain to remain within a "reformed EU". The terms of the UK's membership of the EU were re-negotiated, with agreement reached in February 2016. The option to leave came to be known as Brexit (a portmanteau of "British" and "exit").

The referendum was held on 23 June 2016. The result was approximately 52% in favour of leaving the European Union and 48% against, with a turnout of 72%. On 24 June, a few hours after the results became known, Cameron announced that he would resign the office of prime minister by the start of the Conservative Party Conference in October 2016. In a speech the next day outside 10 Downing Street, he stated that, on account of his own advocacy on behalf of remaining in the EU: "I do not think it would be right for me to try to be the captain that steers our country to its next destination."

There was some strong criticism made of Cameron and his government following the referendum. Matthew Norman, in an opinion piece in The Independent, called the referendum an act of "indescribably selfish recklessness". In late July, Parliament's Foreign Affairs Select Committee was told that Cameron had refused to allow the Civil Service to make plans for Brexit, a decision the committee described as "an act of gross negligence". His farewell speech as he left No. 10 accompanied by his family stressed the value of selfless public service.

The Conservative Party leadership election was scheduled for 9 September and the new leader was expected to be in place by the autumn conference, set to begin on 2 October. On 11 July, following the withdrawal of Andrea Leadsom from the Conservative Party leadership election and the confirmation of Theresa May as the new leader of the Conservative Party, Cameron announced he would hold a final cabinet meeting on 12 July and then, following a final Prime Minister's Questions, submit his resignation to the Queen on the afternoon of 13 July. Cameron delivered his resignation speech in front of 10 Downing Street on 11 July. Cameron's resignation speech attracted further attention when he walked away humming a tune, picked up by microphone, after he had finished his speech. After his final Prime Minister's Questions, Cameron received a standing ovation from MPs; his final comment was, "I was the future once"—a reference to his 2005 quip to Tony Blair, "he was the future once". Cameron then submitted his resignation to the Queen later that day.

Although no longer serving as prime minister, Cameron originally stated that he would continue inside Parliament, on the Conservative backbenches. On 12 September, however, he announced that he was resigning his seat with immediate effect, and was appointed to the Manor of Northstead. He was succeeded as MP for Witney by fellow Conservative Robert Courts. The Washington Post described him as having "sped away without glancing back" once Theresa May had "vaulted herself out of the hurricane-strength political wreckage of Britain's vote to leave the European Union."

== Post-premiership (2016–present) ==
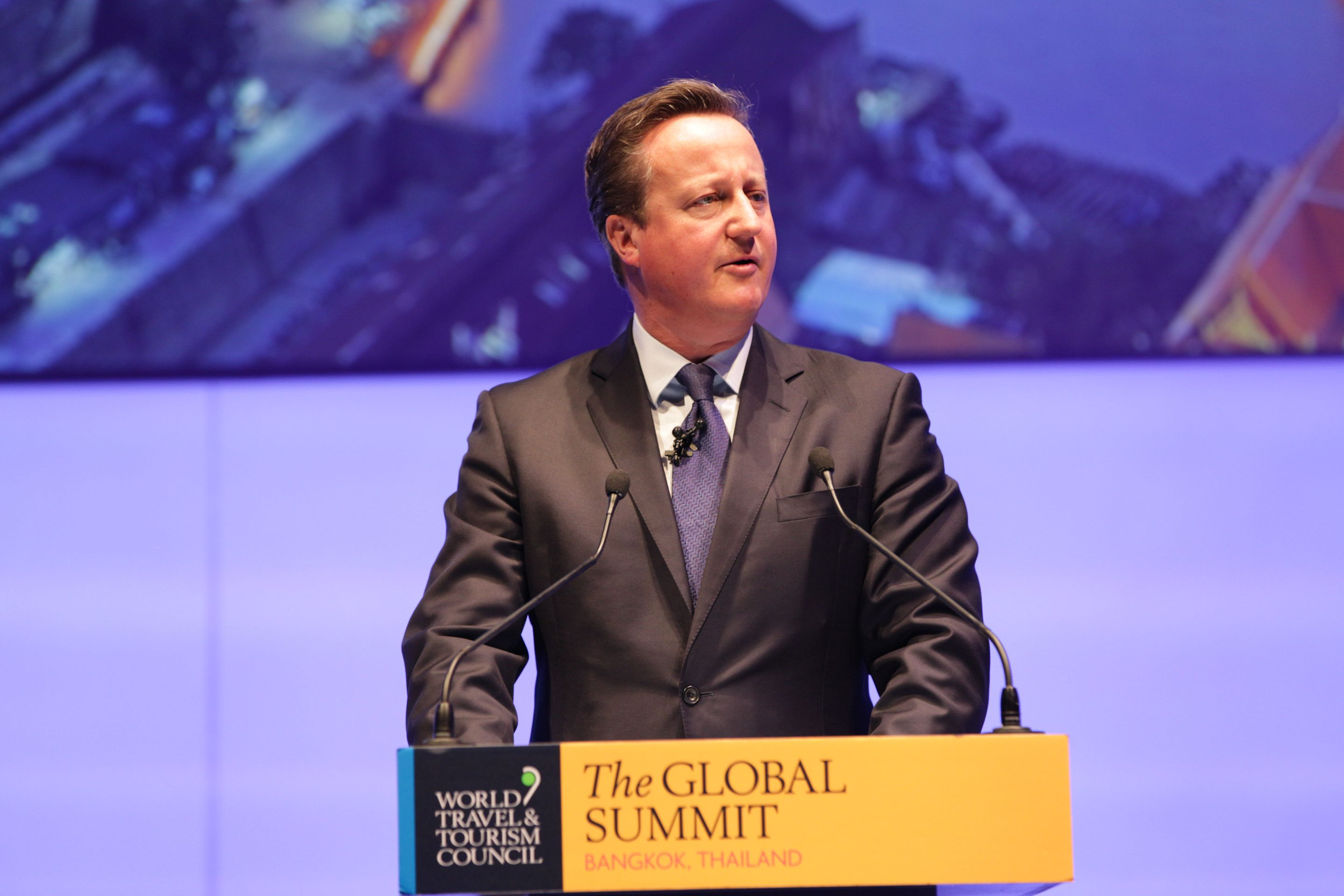
Speaking at a World Travel and Tourism Council meeting in April 2017

=== Positions ===
In October 2016 Cameron became chairman of the National Citizen Service Patrons. In January 2017, he was appointed president of Alzheimer's Research UK to address misconceptions surrounding dementia and campaign for medical research funding to tackle the condition. He left the position upon his appointment as foreign secretary in November 2023, before returning to the charity as president in March 2025.

All appointments post-premiership have to be approved by the UK government's Advisory Committee on Business Appointments. In addition to the two posts above, they have also approved the following positions:

- Consultant and Chair of International Advisory Board, Illumina Inc.
- Vice-chair, UK-China Fund
- Member of the Board of Directors, ONE
- Consultant and Brand Ambassador, First Data Corporation
- Member, Global Board of Advisers, Council on Foreign Relations
- Chairman, LSE-Oxford Commission on Growth in Fragile States
- Public speaker, Washington Speakers Bureau

=== Brexit ===
Cameron maintained a low profile following his resignation as prime minister and the subsequent Brexit negotiations. In January 2019, following May's defeat in the House of Commons over her draft withdrawal agreement, Cameron gave a rare interview to reporters outside his house in Notting Hill, saying he backed May's Brexit deal with the EU and did not regret calling the 2016 referendum. However, he later said that the outcome of the referendum had left him "hugely depressed", and told The Times he knew "some people will never forgive me". He confessed: "Every single day I think about it, and the fact that we lost, and the consequences, and the things that could have been done differently, and I worry desperately".

In the months following Boris Johnson's election as prime minister, Cameron began criticising Johnson's Brexit strategy, including his decision to prorogue parliament ahead of the Brexit deadline of 31 October, and the removal of the whip from Conservative MPs who voted to block a no-deal Brexit. Additionally, he accused Johnson, as well as Michael Gove, of behaving "appallingly" during the referendum campaign of 2016.

In September 2020, Cameron became the fifth former prime minister to criticise the UK Internal Market Bill, over which he said he had "misgivings". He said the "bigger picture" was about trying to get a trade deal with the EU, urging the government to "keep that context [and] that big prize in mind."

=== Memoir ===
Cameron published a memoir, For the Record, on 19 September 2019 through HarperCollins. He was reported to have signed an £800,000 contract for the book. According to the Guardian, the book was initially scheduled for 2018, but was delayed so Cameron would not be perceived as a "backstreet driver" in the ongoing Brexit negotiations. The book gives an insight into his life at 10 Downing Street, as well as inside explanations of the decisions taken by his government. Cameron said that his aim in writing the book was to "correct the record" where he thought it was wrong.

=== Greensill scandal ===
During Cameron's premiership, the financier Lex Greensill was an unpaid advisor who had access to eleven government departments. In 2018 Cameron became an advisor to Greensill Capital, including options in the company's shares reportedly worth as much as $60 million. He also earned a salary of over $1 million for 25 days' work per year. A Panorama investigation concluded that, overall, through a combination of his salary and share sales, Cameron earned around $10 million before tax for 30 months' part-time work.

In 2019 Cameron arranged for a private meeting with Lex Greensill and Secretary of State for Health and Social Care Matt Hancock; under Hancock, several NHS trusts went on to use Greensill Capital's Earnd app. In 2020 a few months before Greensill Capital collapsed, Cameron lobbied the government to bend the rules to allow it to receive Covid Corporate Financing Facility loans. He sent several text messages to Chancellor of the Exchequer Rishi Sunak, who ultimately declined to help Greensill; Cameron also held ten virtual meetings with permanent secretaries Tom Scholar and Charles Roxburgh to try to obtain money for Greensill. The government-owned British Business Bank lent Greensill up to £400m through a different scheme, leading to a potential £335m loss to the taxpayer. After press revelations in 2021 regarding the extent of Greensill Capital's access, a formal investigation was launched by the UK lobbying registrar to be led by Nigel Boardman, a non-executive board member of the Department for Business, Energy and Industrial Strategy.

=== NYU Abu Dhabi ===
In January 2023, Cameron was assigned to teach politics in a three-week course at New York University Abu Dhabi. He was to lecture students on "practising politics and government in the age of disruption", which included topics like the Ukraine war and migration crisis.

=== Migrant crisis ===
In May 2023, Cameron expressed support for the Rwanda asylum plan and Suella Braverman's policies against illegal immigration into the UK, arguing in an interview with LBC: "I think if you don't have a better answer to the things that the government is doing to try and stop this illegal trade, then I think there's no point criticising."

=== COVID-19 Inquiry ===
Cameron gave evidence to the UK COVID-19 Inquiry on 19 June 2023.

== Foreign Secretary (2023–2024) ==
In Rishi Sunak's cabinet reshuffle on 13 November 2023, Cameron was appointed Foreign Secretary, replacing James Cleverly, who became Home Secretary. It was also announced simultaneously that he would receive a life peerage, thus making Cameron a member of the House of Lords and the first former prime minister to be raised to the peerage since Margaret Thatcher. He was created Baron Cameron of Chipping Norton, of Chipping Norton in the County of Oxfordshire on 17 November 2023. Cameron was introduced to the House of Lords on 20 November, supported by Nicholas True, Baron True and Susan Williams, Baroness Williams of Trafford.

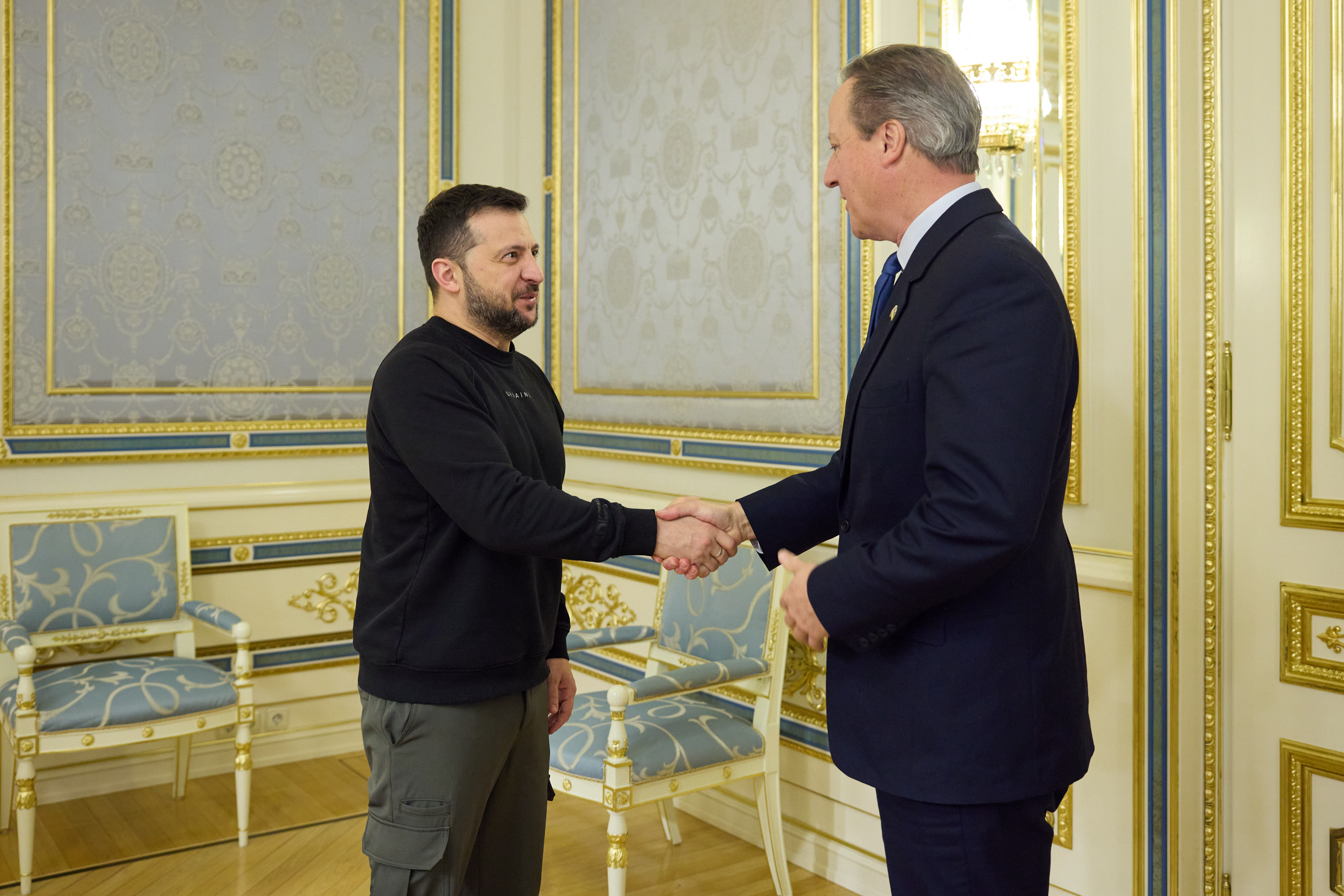
Cameron greeting Ukrainian President Volodymyr Zelenskyy in November 2023

His tenure was dominated by the Russian invasion of Ukraine, the Gaza war, and the Gaza humanitarian crisis. Cameron visited 35 countries and territories during his tenure as foreign secretary, and was deputised in the House of Commons by Andrew Mitchell. Cameron visited the site of the Be'eri massacre, part of the 2023 Hamas-led attack on Israel, on 23 November to meet Israeli foreign minister Eli Cohen. Afterwards, he met the Israeli prime minister Benjamin Netanyahu to discuss among other urgent matters, facilitating further aid to Gaza. Cameron said in an interview with the BBC that he told Israeli officials that "they must abide by international humanitarian law" and that the number of Palestinian casualties was "too high". He also said that the "settler violence" against Palestinians in the occupied West Bank is "completely unacceptable". Cameron backed a "sustainable ceasefire" in the Gaza Strip on 17 December, called for more aid to reach Gaza, and called for the Israeli government to "do more to discriminate sufficiently between terrorists and civilians". He, however, rejected calls for a "general and immediate ceasefire", differentiating this from the "sustainable ceasefire" he called for alongside German foreign minister Annalena Baerbock.

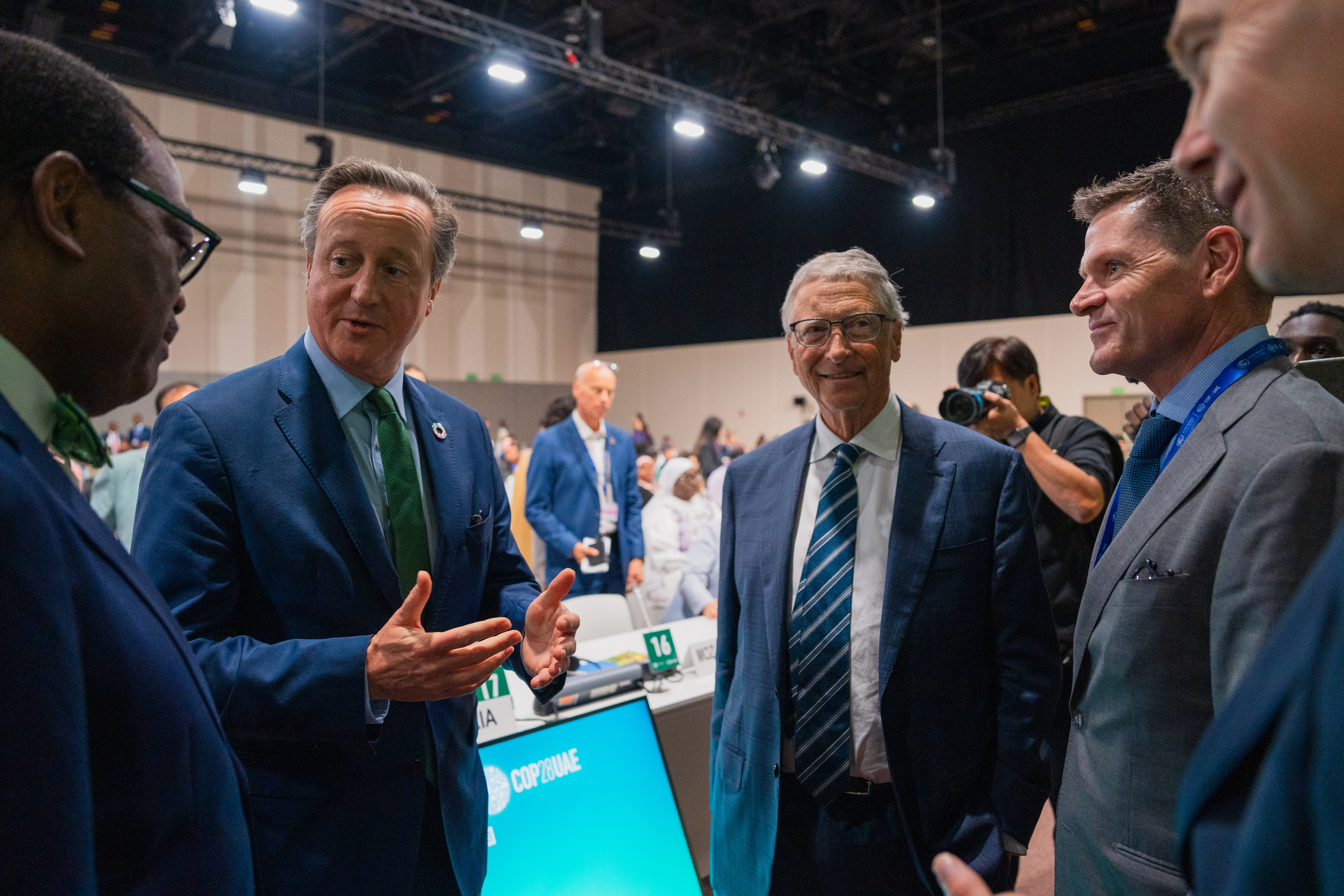
Cameron at COP28 with Bill Gates

In January 2024 he expressed concern about potential breaches of international law by Israel, specifically addressing the need for Israel to restore water supplies to Gaza. Cameron said in the same month that "Israel is acting in self-defence after the appalling attack on October 7" and denied that Israel is committing war crimes in Gaza. He dismissed South Africa's ICJ genocide case against Israel as "nonsense", saying that Israel is "a democracy, a country with the rule of law, a country with armed forces that are committed to obeying the rule of law". Cameron announced in late January that the government would consider recognising Palestine as a country, while also adding that would help to make a two-state solution "irreversible". In April 2024 Cameron threatened the chief prosecutor of the International Criminal Court, Karim Khan, that the UK would "defund the court and withdraw from the Rome Statute" if it issued arrest warrants for Israeli politicians. The court subsequently issued arrest warrants for Israeli prime minister Benjamin Netanyahu and Defence Minister Yoav Gallant.

Cameron supported the February 2024 US Senate bill to allocate military aid to Ukraine, Taiwan and Israel, saying that he did not want the West to "show weakness displayed against Vladimir Putin in 2008, when he invaded Georgia, or the uncertainty of the response in 2014, when he took Crimea and much of the Donbas—before coming back to cost us far more with his aggression in 2022". In the event the Senate bill failed to pass in the House of Representatives, where it was stalled by the GOP partisans of Donald Trump. At last a redrafted legislative package was put forward by Speaker Mike Johnson each of which passed the House with bipartisan support and large majorities on 20 April, but not before Cameron was snubbed by Johnson.

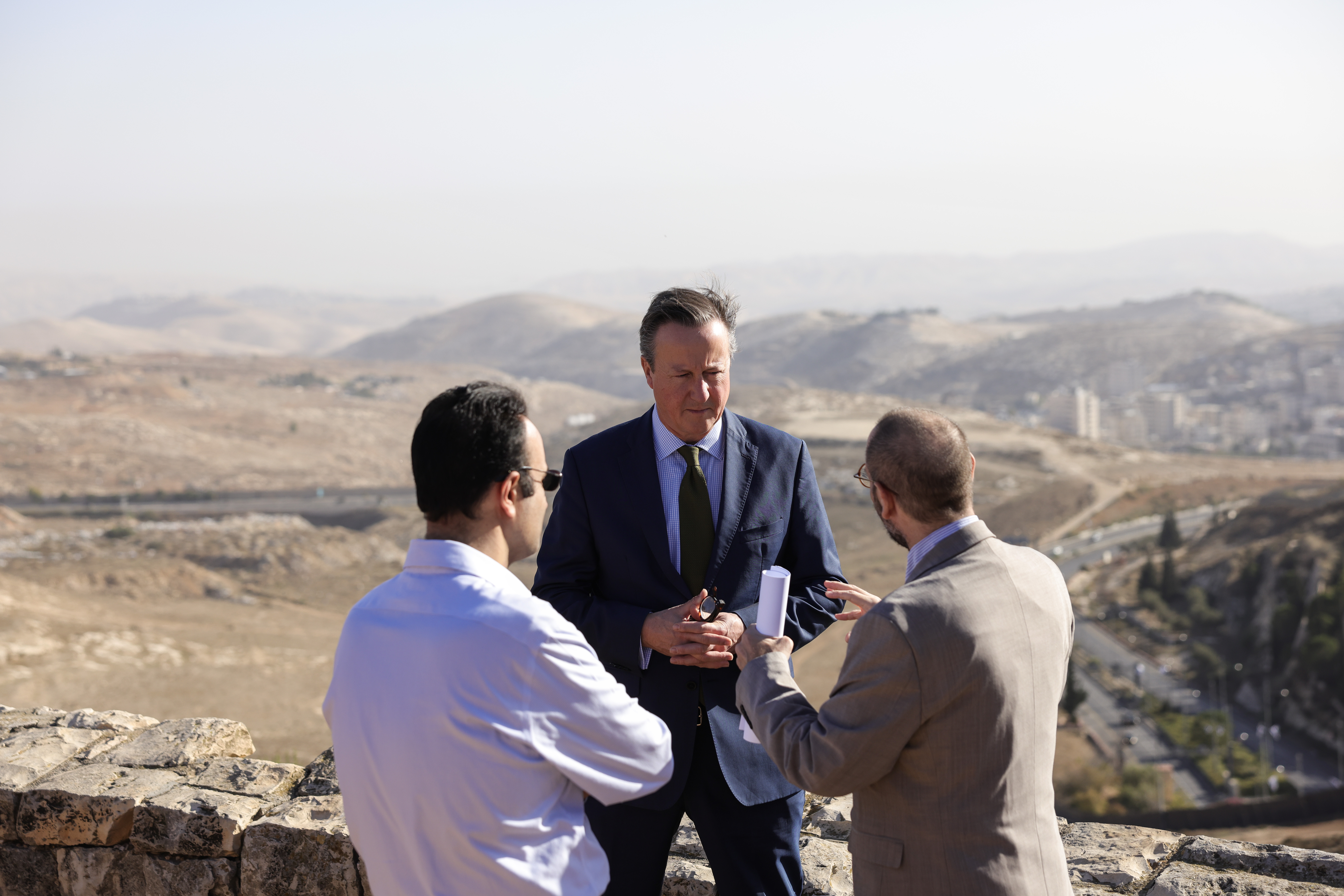
Cameron in Jerusalem overlooking the West Bank

Iran attacked Israel in April 2024 with 301 drones and missiles, and the UK aided Israel to shoot them all down with RAF Eurofighter Typhoons. Cameron told LBC radio host Nick Ferrari that, were the UK to offer the same sort of support to Ukraine, it would represent a "dangerous escalation". In the same month, he became the first British foreign secretary to visit Tajikistan, Kyrgyzstan and Turkmenistan. In June 2024 Cameron was tricked by Russian pranksters Vovan and Lexus, posing as former Ukrainian president Petro Poroshenko. Cameron, duped into believing he was actually speaking to Poroshenko, made a series of disclosures relating to the war in Ukraine, including details from a private dinner he had with then-U.S. presidential candidate Donald Trump.

After the Conservatives lost the 2024 general election in a landslide to the opposition Labour Party led by Keir Starmer, Cameron was succeeded by David Lammy, whom he congratulated. A few days later he announced that he would be retiring from frontline politics whilst continuing to support the party, with his deputy Andrew Mitchell becoming shadow foreign secretary in Sunak's shadow cabinet instead. However, he maintains his House of Lords seat. In March 2025, Cameron announced in The Sunday Times that he was returning as President of Alzheimer's Research UK.

== Political positions ==
=== Self-description of views ===
Cameron described himself in December 2005 as a "modern compassionate conservative" and spoke of a need for a new style of politics, saying that he was "fed up with the Punch and Judy politics of Westminster". He was "certainly a big Thatcher fan, but I don't know whether that makes me a Thatcherite", saying he was a "liberal Conservative", though "not a deeply ideological person." As leader of the opposition, Cameron asserted that he did not intend to oppose the government as a matter of course, and would offer his support in areas of agreement. He has urged politicians to concentrate more on improving people's happiness and "general well-being", instead of focusing solely on "financial wealth". There were claims that he described himself to journalists at a dinner during the leadership contest as the "heir to Blair".

In his first Conservative conference speech as party leader in Bournemouth in 2006, he described the National Health Service as "one of the 20th Century's greatest achievements". He went on to say: "Tony Blair explained his priorities in three words: education, education, education. I can do it in three letters: N.H.S." He also talked about his severely disabled son, Ivan, concluding: "So, for me, it is not just a question of saying the NHS is safe in my hands—of course it will be. My family is so often in the hands of the NHS, so I want them to be safe there."

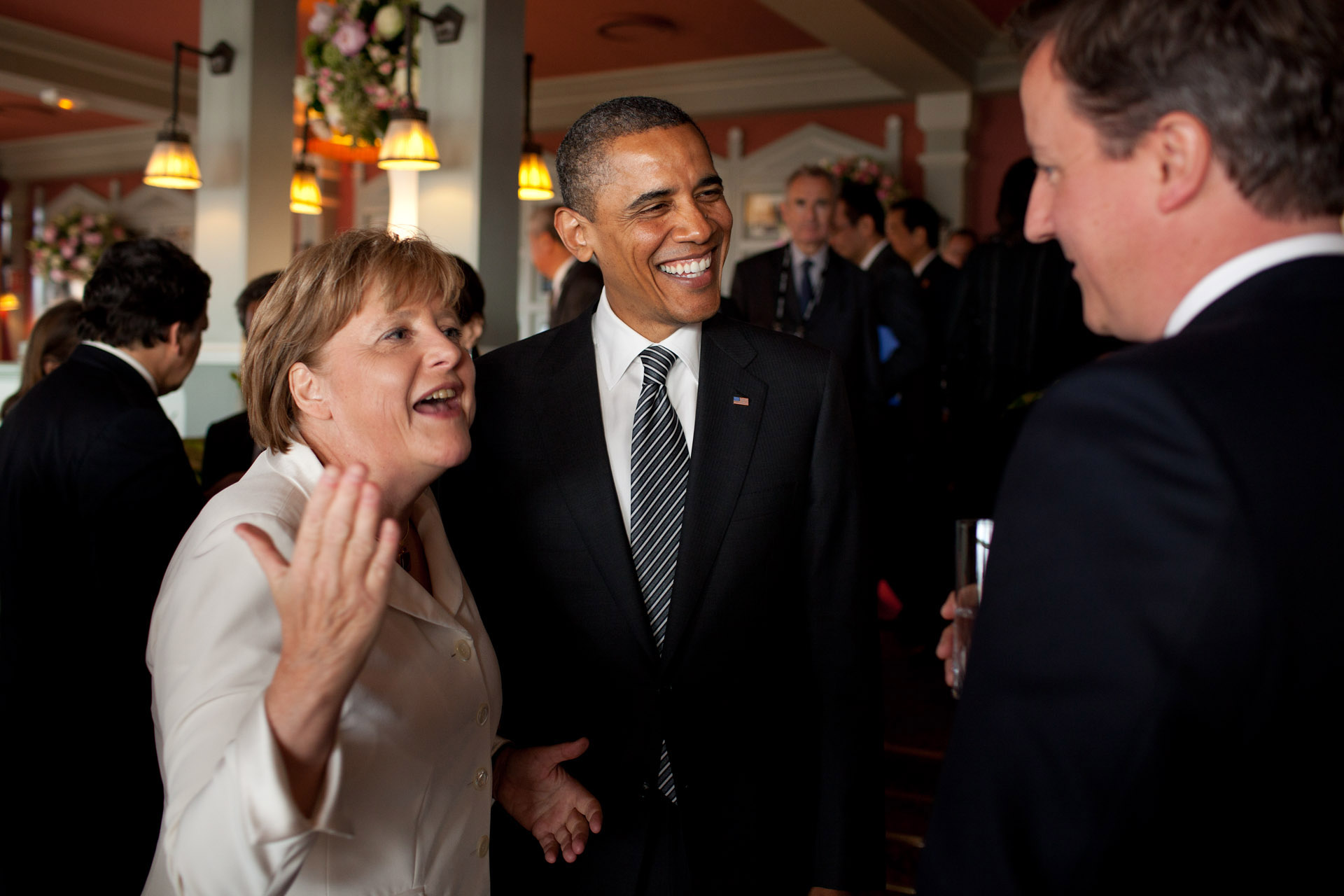
With Barack Obama and then German chancellor Angela Merkel at Deauville, France, May 2011

Cameron said that he believed in "spreading freedom and democracy, and supporting humanitarian intervention" in cases such as the genocide in Darfur, Sudan. He said he rejected neoconservatism because, as a conservative, he recognises "the complexities of human nature, and will always be sceptical of grand schemes to remake the world." A supporter of multilateralism, as "a country may act alone—but it cannot always succeed alone", he believes multilateralism can take the form of acting through "NATO, the UN, the G8, the EU and other institutions", or through international alliances. Cameron said: "If the West is to help other countries, we must do so from a position of genuine moral authority" and "we must strive above all for legitimacy in what we do."

Cameron believes that British Muslims have a duty to integrate into British culture, but noted in an article published in 2007, that the Muslim community finds aspects such as high divorce rates and drug use uninspiring, and: "Not for the first time, I found myself thinking that it is mainstream Britain which needs to integrate more with the British Asian way of life, not the other way around." In his first speech as PM on radicalisation and the causes of terrorism in February 2011, Cameron said that "state multiculturalism" had failed. In 2010 he appointed the first Muslim member of the British cabinet, Baroness Warsi, as a minister without portfolio, and in 2012 made her a special minister of state in foreign affairs. She resigned, however, in August 2014 over the government's handling of the 2014 Israel–Gaza conflict.

While urging members of his party to support the coalition's proposals for same-sex marriage, Cameron said that he backed gay marriage not in spite of his conservatism, but because he is a conservative, and claimed it was about equality. In 2012 Cameron publicly apologised for Thatcher-era policies on homosexuality, specifically the introduction of the controversial Section 28 of the Local Government Act 1988, which he described as "a mistake".

=== Home affairs ===
==== Poverty ====
In 2006 Cameron described poverty as a "moral disgrace" and promised to tackle relative poverty. In 2007 Cameron promised: "We can make British poverty history, and we will make British poverty history". The same year he also stated: "Ending child poverty is central to improving child well-being". In 2015 Polly Toynbee questioned Cameron's commitment to tackling poverty, contrasting his earlier statements agreeing that "poverty is relative" with proposals to change the government's poverty measure, and saying that cuts in child tax credits would increase child poverty among low-paid working families. Cameron denied that austerity had contributed to the 2011 England riots, instead blaming street gangs and opportunistic looters.

==== LGBT rights ====
In 2010 Cameron was given a score of 36% in favour of lesbian, gay and bisexual equality by Stonewall. Prior to 2005 Cameron was opposed to gay rights, calling it a "fringe agenda" and attacking Prime Minister Tony Blair for "moving heaven and earth to allow the promotion of homosexuality in our schools" by repealing the anti-gay Section 28 of the Local Government Act 1988. Cameron is recorded by Hansard as having voted against same-sex adoption rights in 2002, but he denies this, claiming he abstained from the three-line whip imposed on him by his party. In 2008, he wanted lesbians who receive IVF treatment to be required to name a father figure, which received condemnation from LGBT equality groups. However, Cameron supported commitment for gay couples in a 2005 speech, and in October 2011 urged Conservative MPs to support gay marriage.

In November 2012 Cameron and Nick Clegg agreed to fast-track legislation for introducing same-sex marriage. Cameron stated that he wanted to give religious groups the ability to host gay marriage ceremonies, and that he did not want to exclude gay people from a "great institution". In 2013 the Marriage (Same Sex Couples) Act 2013 became law despite opposition from more than half of his fellow Conservative MPs, including Cabinet ministers Owen Paterson and David Jones. He also subsequently appointed two women who had voted against same-sex marriage as ministers in the Government Equalities Office, Nicky Morgan and Caroline Dinenage following the 2015 general election.

In August 2013 he rejected calls by Stephen Fry and others to strip Russia from hosting the 2014 Winter Olympics due to its anti-gay laws. Cameron did not attend the games, but denied it was a boycott in protest at Russia's laws, having previously raised the issue of gay rights in the country with Vladimir Putin.

==== Marriage and family values ====
In 2009 Cameron said "the restoration of family values and a new commitment to economic and social responsibility" were "key to repairing 'broken Britain'". In 2013 Cameron described himself as "a marriage man, I am a great supporter of marriage. I want to promote marriage, defend marriage, encourage marriage." As such, he rejected calls from Conservative MP Christopher Chope to extend civil partnership rights to heterosexual couples, saying: "I think we should be promoting marriage rather than looking at any other way of weakening it." In 2018 the Supreme Court ruled unanimously that this position was discriminatory.

Assisted dying

In November 2024, Cameron announced he was in favour of Terminally Ill Adults (End of Life) Bill on assisted dying, having previously opposed legalising the practice.

==== Comments on other parties and politicians ====
Cameron criticised Gordon Brown (when Brown was Chancellor of the Exchequer) for being "an analogue politician in a digital age" and referred to him as "the roadblock to reform". As prime minister, he reacted to press reports that Brown could be the next head of the International Monetary Fund by hinting that he may block the appointment, citing the huge national debt that Brown left the country with as a reason for Brown not being suitable for the role.

He said that John Prescott "clearly looks a fool" after Prescott's personal indiscretions were revealed in spring 2006, and wondered if the deputy prime minister had broken the ministerial code. During a speech to the Ethnic Media Conference in November 2006, Cameron also described Ken Livingstone, the mayor of London, as an "ageing far left politician" following Livingstone's criticism of Trevor Phillips, head of the Commission for Racial Equality.

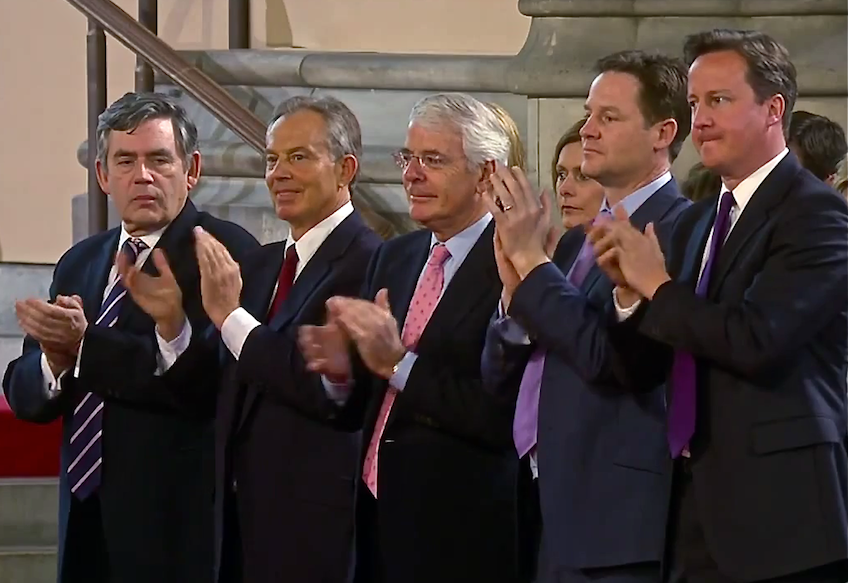
With his predecessors Gordon Brown, Tony Blair, John Major and Deputy PM Nick Clegg, during Barack Obama's address in Westminster Hall, June 2011

In April 2006 Cameron accused the UK Independence Party of being "fruitcakes, loonies and closet racists, mostly", leading UKIP MEP Nigel Farage (who became leader in September of that year) to demand an apology for the remarks. Right-wing Conservative MP Bob Spink, who later defected to UKIP, also criticised the remarks, as did The Daily Telegraph. Cameron was seen encouraging Conservative MPs to join the standing ovation given to Tony Blair at the end of his last Prime Minister's Question Time; he had paid tribute to the "huge efforts" Blair had made and said Blair had "considerable achievements to his credit, whether it is peace in Northern Ireland or his work in the developing world, which will endure".

In January 2007 Cameron made a speech in which he described extremist Islamic organisations and the British National Party as "mirror images" to each other, both preaching "creeds of pure hatred". Cameron is listed as being a supporter of Unite Against Fascism.

In September 2015 after the election of Jeremy Corbyn as Labour leader, Cameron called the party a "threat" to British national and economic security, on the basis of Corbyn's defence and fiscal policies.

=== Foreign affairs ===
==== Iraq War ====
In an interview on Friday Night with Jonathan Ross in 2006, Cameron said that he supported the decision of the then Labour Government to go to war in Iraq, and said that he thought supporters should "see it through". He also supported a motion brought by the SNP and Plaid Cymru in 2006, calling for an inquiry into the government's conduct of the Iraq war. In 2011 he oversaw the withdrawal of British soldiers from Iraq. He repeatedly called for the Chilcot Inquiry into the Iraq war to conclude and publish its findings, saying: "People want to know the truth".

==== India ====
Cameron was a strong advocate of increased ties between India and the United Kingdom, describing Indian–British relations as the "New Special Relationship" in 2010.

In October 2012 as Narendra Modi rose to prominence in India, the UK rescinded its boycott of the then-Gujarat state Chief Minister over religious riots in Gujarat in 2002 that left more than 2,000 dead, and in November 2013, Cameron commented that he was "open" to meeting Modi. Modi was later elected as prime minister in a landslide majority, leading to Cameron calling Modi and congratulating him on the "election success", one of the first Western leaders to do so.

==== Israel ====
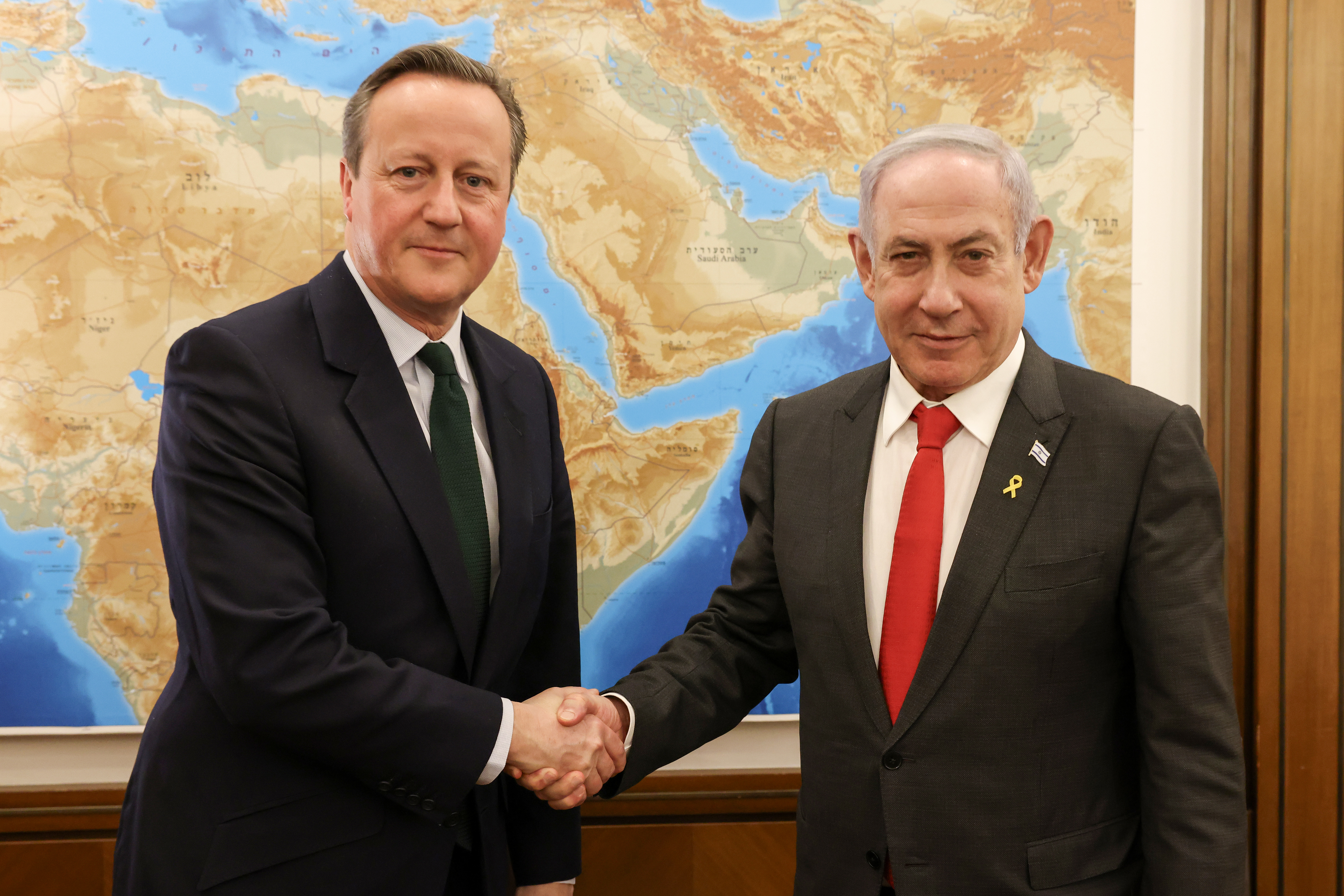
With Prime Minister of Israel Benjamin Netanyahu at Jerusalem, January 2024

In January 2024, Cameron dismissed South Africa's ICJ genocide case against Israel as "nonsense", saying that Israel is "a democracy, a country with the rule of law, a country with armed forces that are committed to obeying the rule of law".

==== China ====
In October 2015 Xi Jinping, the president of China, paid a state visit to the United Kingdom under the premiership of Cameron. Such episodes including the Chinese leader famously having a pint with Cameron at a local pub in Buckinghamshire, and Queen Elizabeth hailing the visit as "milestone" during state banquet, symbolised the increased cordiality between China and the United Kingdom under Cameron, in spite of the controversies around the state visit and the concerns with China's superpower status. The state visit was the third formal Anglo–Chinese diplomatic meetings, which involves either head of states or head of governments, following Cameron's visit to China in 2013 and then–Premier Li Keqiang's UK visit in 2014; the year 2015 alone also marked an unprecedented level of bilateral meetings and visits.

The unprecedented level of friendly relations with China has also led to many, including the PRC and Cameron himself, marking his premiership as a "golden-era" of UK–China relations, where bilateral cooperation between the countries reached its apex. The UK government was even seen expressing interests in participating in Chinese diplomatic projects under Xi Jinping, such as the Asian Infrastructure Investment Bank (AIIB) and the Belt and Road Initiative (BRI). By 2023, upon Cameron's appointment as foreign secretary, eight years apart from the state visit of Xi, he was associating by media outlets, home and abroad, with the keyword "golden era", even dubbing Cameron himself as "Lord Golden Era", prompting concerns over the stances of the Sunak government towards China as the latter welcomed Cameron's appointment as foreign secretary.

==== Russia ====
In the years after Cameron became UK prime minister, UK relations with Russia initially showed a marked improvement. In 2011 Cameron visited Russia, and in 2012, Putin visited the UK for the first time in seven years, holding talks with Cameron, and also visiting the 2012 London Olympics together.

In May 2013 Cameron flew to meet Putin at his summer residence in Sochi, Bocharov Ruchei, to hold talks on the Syria crisis. Cameron described the talks as "very substantive, purposeful and useful", and the leaders exchanged presents with each other. At that time, it was suggested that Cameron could use his good relations with both US president Barack Obama, and President Putin to act as a 'go-between' in international relations. However, Cameron's relations to Russia soured drastically following the Russo-Ukrainian War. Cameron criticised the 2014 Crimean status referendum as a "sham", with voters having "voted under the barrel of a Kalashnikov", stating "Russia has sought to annex Crimea.... This is a flagrant breach of international law and something we will not recognise." Cameron has gone on to be a fierce critic of Russia, and Putin, and supporter of Ukraine.

== Political image ==
=== "Dodgy Dave" moniker ===
In April 2016 then Labour MP for Bolsover, Dennis Skinner was reprimanded by House Speaker John Bercow for referring to Cameron as 'Dodgy Dave' (related to Skinner's contention of Cameron's dishonesty) in a parliamentary debate about the Panama Papers. Skinner was instructed by Bercow to repeat his question without referring to Cameron using the adjective 'dodgy'. When Skinner repeated his question, once again referring to Cameron as 'Dodgy Dave', he was ordered to leave parliament for the remainder of that day's session. In July 2016, Skinner once again referred to Cameron as 'Dodgy Dave' in parliament, however this time he was not reprimanded, or asked to leave.

"Dodgy Dave" has gained usage in the media, and on social media, when Cameron is being referred to disparagingly.

=== Allegations of social elitism ===
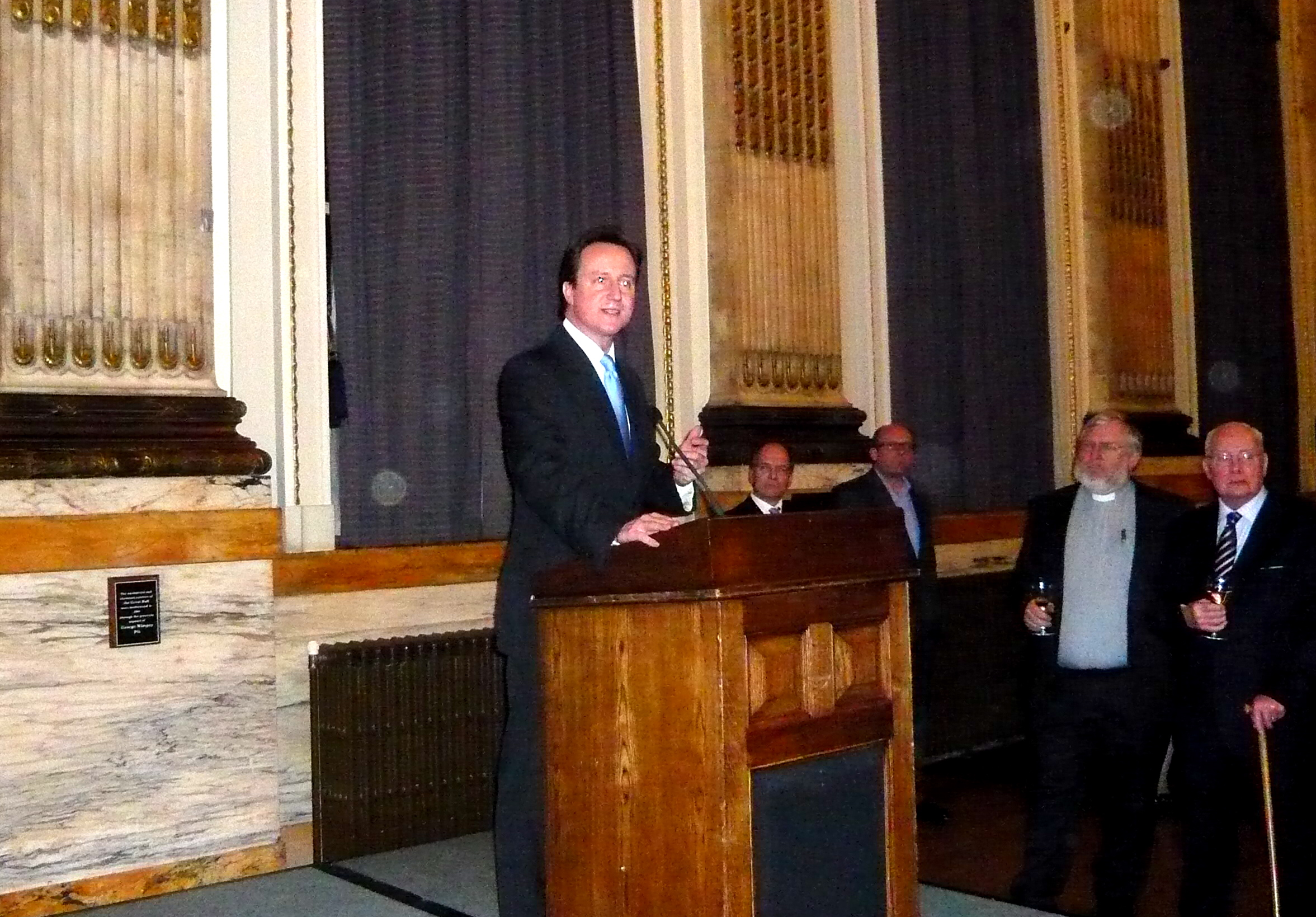
Speaking at a Conservative reception in 2008

As leader of the Conservative Party, Cameron was accused of relying on "old-boy networks", and criticised by his party for the imposition of selective shortlists of women and ethnic minority prospective parliamentary candidates. Several of Cameron's senior appointments, such as George Osborne as chancellor of the Exchequer, are former members of the Bullingdon Club. Michael Gove conceded it was "ridiculous" how many fellow Cabinet ministers were old Etonians, though he placed the blame on the failings of the state education system rather than Cameron. However, Michael Mosbacher, co-founder of Standpoint, wrote that Cameron's cabinet has the lowest number of Etonians of any past Conservative government: "David Cameron's government is the least patrician, least wealthy and least public-school-educated—indeed the least Etonian Conservative-led government this country has ever seen".

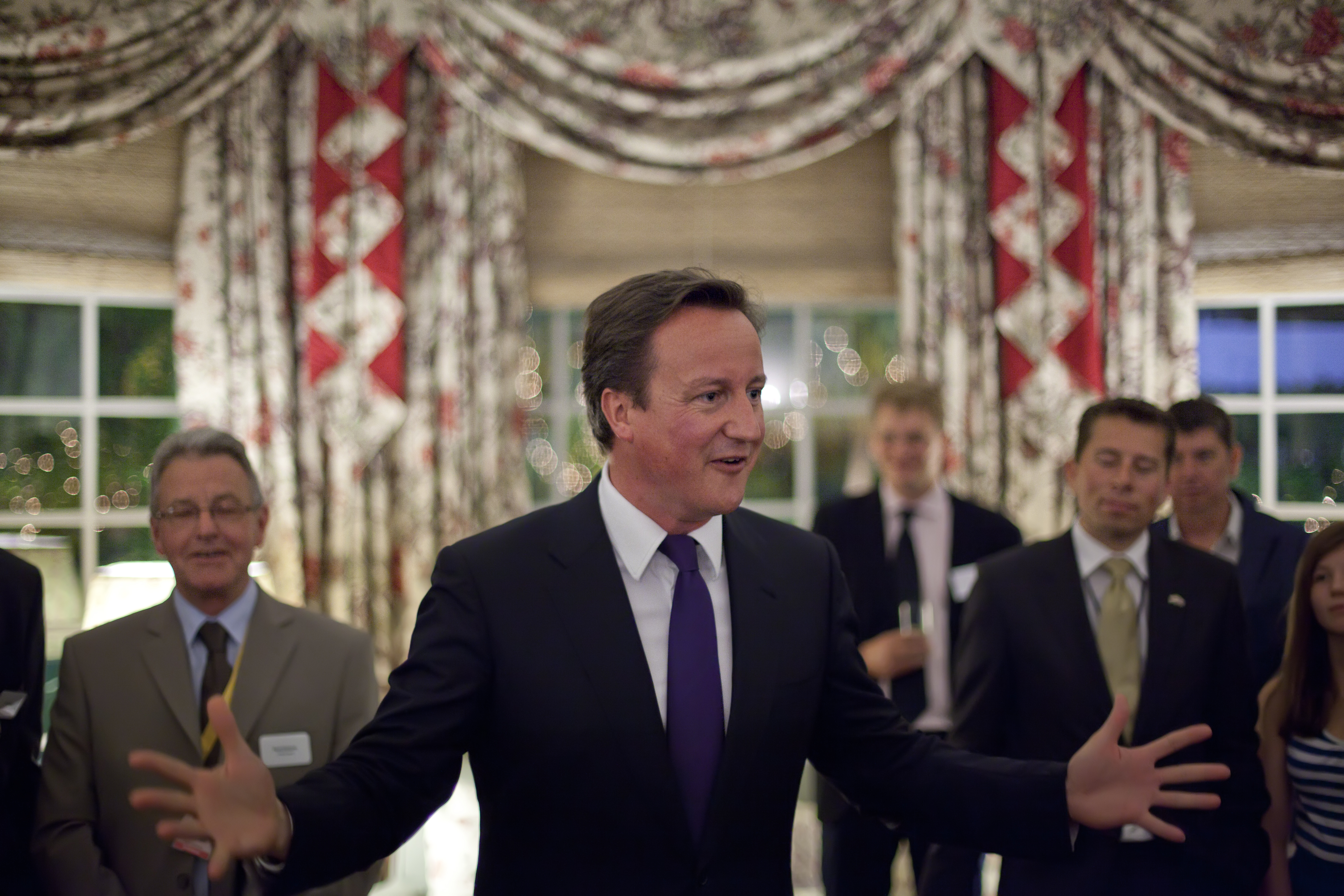
Speaking in 2010

=== Plots against leadership ===
Following poor results in the May 2012 local elections after a difficult few months for the government, with Labour increasing its lead in the polls, there were concerns from Conservative MPs about Cameron's leadership and his electability. David Davies, the chairman of the Welsh Affairs Select Committee, accused the Conservative leadership of "incompetence", and hinted that it could risk Cameron's leadership. Nadine Dorries warned the prime minister that a leadership challenge could happen.

Later that year, Conservative MP Brian Binley openly said that Cameron's leadership was like being a "maid" to the Liberal Democrats, and accused him of leading the party to defeat. In January 2013, it was revealed that Adam Afriyie was planning his own bid for the Conservative leadership with the support of fellow MPs Mark Field, Bill Wiggin, Chris Heaton-Harris, Patrick Mercer, Jonathan Djanogly and Dan Byles. The Times and ConservativeHome revealed that a "rebel reserve" of 55 Conservative MPs gave firm pledges to a co-ordinating MP to support a motion of no confidence and write to Brady simultaneously, more than the 46 MPs needed to trigger a vote of no confidence. Andrew Bridgen openly called for a vote of confidence in Cameron's leadership, and claimed that the Prime Minister had a "credibility problem", but he dropped his bid for a contest a year later.

=== Cameron and Andy Coulson ===
In 2007 Cameron appointed Andy Coulson, former editor of the News of the World, as his director of communications. Coulson had resigned as the paper's editor following the conviction of a reporter in relation to illegal phone hacking, although stating that he knew nothing about it. In June 2010, Downing Street confirmed Coulson's annual salary as £140,000, the highest pay of any special adviser to UK Government.

In January 2011, Coulson left his post, saying that coverage of the phone-hacking scandal was making it difficult to give his best to the job. In July 2011, Coulson was arrested and questioned by police in connection with further allegations of illegal activities at the News of the World, and released on bail. Despite a call to apologise for hiring Coulson by the Leader of the Opposition, Cameron defended the appointment, saying that he had taken a conscious choice to give someone who had screwed up a second chance. The same month, in a special parliamentary session at the House of Commons, arranged to discuss the News International phone hacking scandal, Cameron said that he "regretted the furore" that had resulted from his appointment of Coulson, and that "with hindsight" he would not have hired him. Coulson was detained and charged with perjury by Strathclyde Police in May 2012. Coulson was convicted of conspiracy to hack phones in June 2014. Prior to the jury handing down their verdict, Cameron issued a "full and frank" apology for hiring him, saying: "I am extremely sorry that I employed him. It was the wrong decision and I am very clear about that." The judge hearing Coulson's trial was critical of the prime minister, pondering whether the intervention was out of ignorance or deliberate, and demanded an explanation.

=== Cameron and Michael Ashcroft ===
Although Lord Michael Ashcroft played a significant role in the 2010 election, he was not offered a ministerial post. In June 2012, shortly before a major Conservative rebellion on House of Lords reform, journalist Peter Oborne credited Ashcroft with "stopping the Coalition working" by moving policy on Europe, welfare, education and taxation to the right. According to Oborne, Ashcroft, owner of both the ConservativeHome and PoliticsHome websites and a "brutal critic of the Coalition from the start", had established "megaphone presence" in the on-line media. He believes Cameron's philosophy of liberal conservatism has been destroyed by "coordinated attacks on the Coalition" and "the two parties are no longer trying to pretend that they are governing together."

In The Observer, Andrew Rawnsley commented that he believes that Ashcroft uses carefully timed opinion polls to "generate publicity", "stir trouble for the Prime Minister" and influence the direction of the party. In 2015, Ashcroft released Call Me Dave, an unauthorised biography of Cameron written with journalist Isabel Oakeshott, which attracted significant media attention for various lurid allegations about Cameron's time at university. The book includes an anonymous anecdote about Cameron, now referred to as Piggate, in which he allegedly inserted his penis into a dead pig's head. No evidence for the anecdote has been produced. Many commentators have described the accusations as a "revenge job" by Ashcroft, who was not offered a senior role in government when Cameron came to power in 2010. Ashcroft initially claimed the book was "not about settling scores", while Oakeshott said that they had held back publication until after the 2015 general election to avoid damaging Cameron and the Conservatives' electoral chances. Ashcroft subsequently admitted that the initiation allegations "may have been case of mistaken identity" and has stated that he has a personal "beef" with Cameron. Cameron later went on to deny these allegations and stated that Ashcroft's reasons for writing the book were clear and the public could see clearly through it.

=== Standing in opinion polls ===
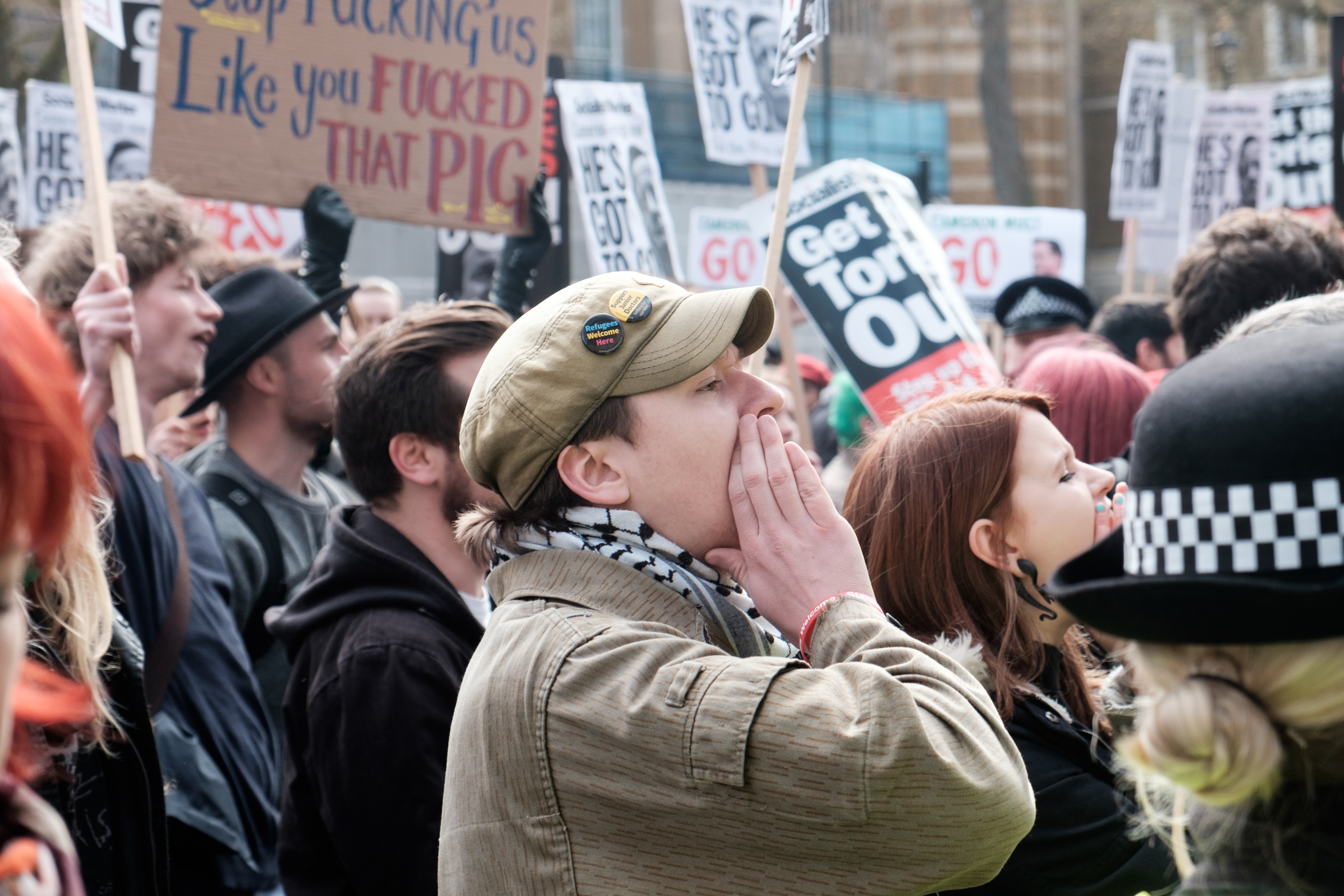
Protesters outside 10 Downing Street calling for Cameron to resign over the Panama Papers scandal, April 2016

An ICM poll in September 2007 saw Cameron rated the least popular of the three main party leaders. A YouGov poll on party leaders conducted on 9–10 June 2011 found 44% of the electorate thought he was doing well and 50% thought he was doing badly, while 38% thought he would be the best PM and 35% did not know. In the run up to the 2015 election, Cameron achieved his first net positive approval rating in four years, with a YouGov poll finding 47% of voters thought he was doing well as prime minister compared with 46% who thought he was doing badly.

In September 2015, an Opinium poll had similar results to the one shortly before the election, with voters split with 42% who approved of him and 41% who did not. Cameron had significantly better net approval ratings in polls conducting in December and January (getting −6 in both) than Labour leader Jeremy Corbyn (who got −38 and −39). However, following the Panama Papers leak in April 2016, his personal approval ratings fell below Corbyn's.

=== Evaluations of premiership ===
In the months immediately following his resignation from the post of prime minister, a number of commentators gave negative evaluations of Cameron's premiership. The University of Leeds' 2016 survey of post-war prime ministers, which collected the views of 82 academics specialising in the history and politics of post-war Britain, ranked Cameron as the third-worst prime minister since 1945, ranking above only Alec Douglas-Home and Anthony Eden. 90% of respondents cited his calling and losing of the Brexit referendum as his greatest failure.

=== In popular culture ===
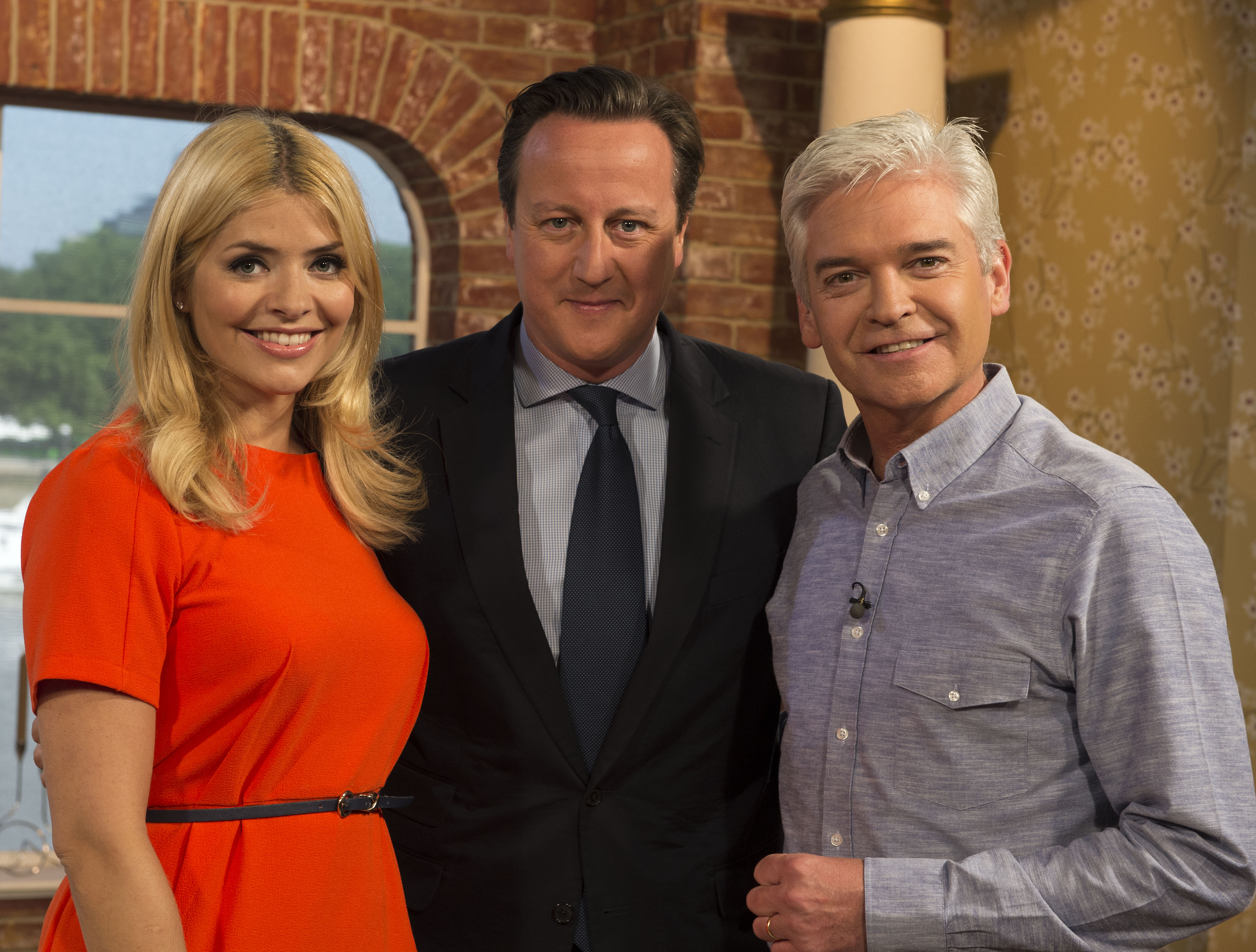
With Holly Willoughby and Phillip Schofield on the set of This Morning in 2013

Cameron made a cameo appearance in the BBC television programme Top Gear's India Special, where he tells the trio of Jeremy Clarkson, James May and Richard Hammond to "stay away from India" after initially denying the group's request to improve economic relations with India in a letter and suggested that they mend fences with Mexico. He later stated through his aides that he did not like the special that he cameoed in, and that he had the "utmost respect" for the people of India. Cameron was portrayed by comedian Jon Culshaw in ITV's satirical sketch show Newzoids, and by Mark Dexter in the Channel 4 television films Coalition and Brexit: The Uncivil War. In 2019 he was interviewed for The Cameron Years, a BBC mini-documentary series on his premiership.

Amid the Jimmy Savile sexual abuse scandal on 8 November 2012, Cameron was interviewed by Phillip Schofield and Holly Willoughby on This Morning, and Schofield presented him with a list he had obtained from the internet of five people named as paedophiles in connection with the North Wales child abuse scandal. The names of several former senior Conservative politicians were visible on the list. Cameron responded by warning against a witchhunt, "particularly about people who are gay". Schofield was widely criticised for his action, with broadcaster Jonathan Dimbleby describing his behaviour as "cretinous". ITV's director of television, Peter Fincham, said that Schofield was "wrong" in confronting Cameron and the broadcaster had agreed to co-operate fully with government regulator Ofcom's investigation into the matter. The investigation was initiated after Ofcom received 415 complaints from viewers. Schofield later apologised, blaming a misjudged camera angle. Schofield and ITV later paid £125,000 compensation to settle a libel suit from one of those falsely accused, Alistair McAlpine, Baron McAlpine of West Green.

== Personal life ==
=== Family ===
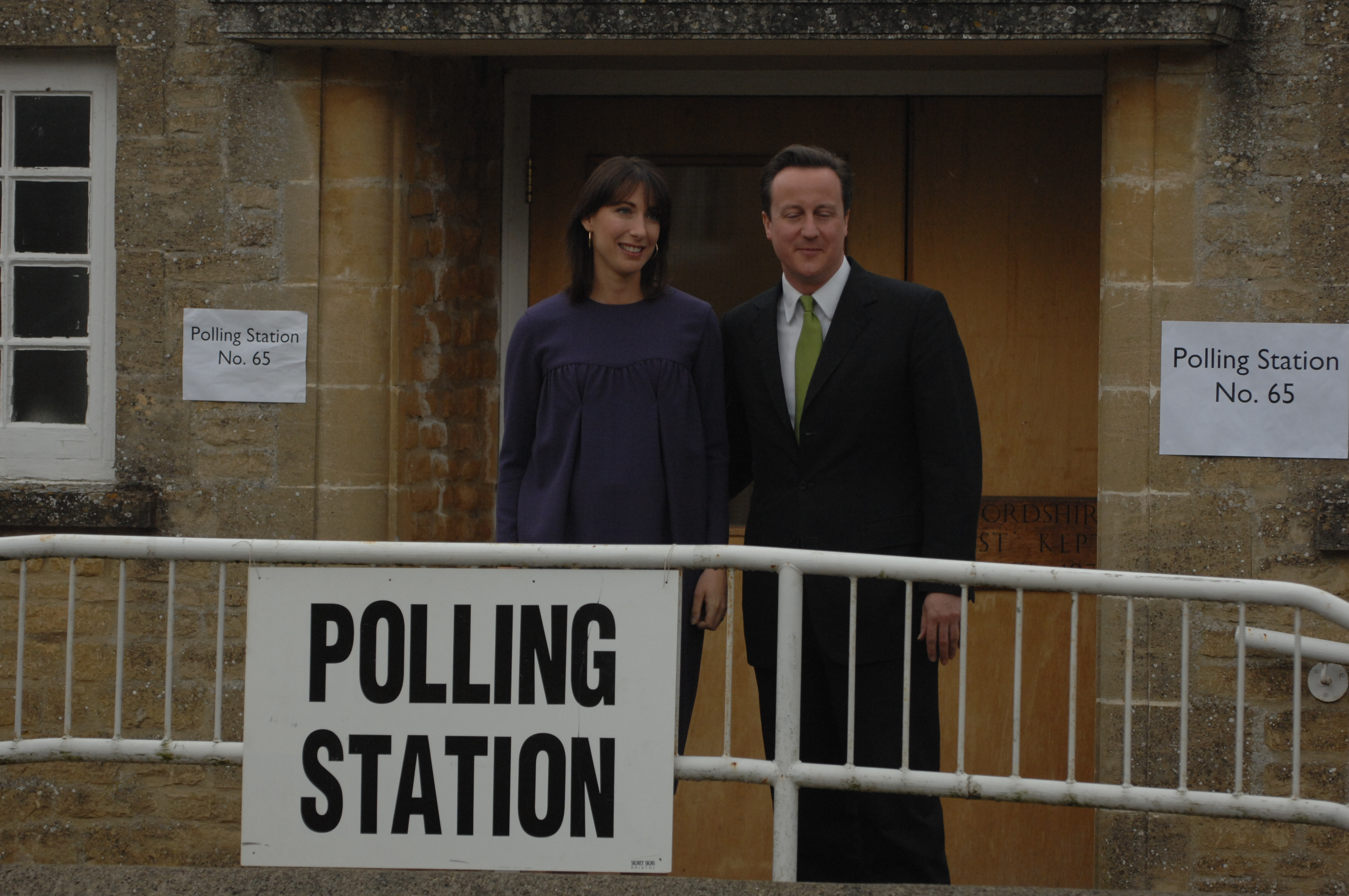
Cameron with his wife, Samantha, at a polling station in 2010

Cameron married Samantha Sheffield, the daughter of Sir Reginald Sheffield, 8th Baronet, and Annabel Lucy Veronica Jones (later Viscountess Astor) in 1996. They have had four children. Their first child, Ivan Reginald Ian, was born on 8 April 2002 in Hammersmith and Fulham, London, with a rare combination of cerebral palsy and a form of severe epilepsy called Ohtahara syndrome, requiring round-the-clock care. Recalling the receipt of this news, Cameron was quoted as saying: "The news hits you like a freight train ... You are depressed for a while because you are grieving for the difference between your hopes and the reality. But then you get over that, because he's wonderful." Ivan was cared for at the specialist NHS Cheyne Day Centre in West London, which closed shortly after he left it. Ivan died at St Mary's Hospital, Paddington, London, on 25 February 2009, aged six.

The Camerons have two daughters, Nancy Gwen (born 2004) and Florence Rose Endellion (born 2010), and a son, Arthur Elwen (born 2006). Cameron took paternity leave when Arthur was born, and this decision received broad coverage. It was also stated that Cameron would be taking paternity leave after his second daughter was born. She was born at the Royal Cornwall Hospital on 24 August 2010, three weeks prematurely, while the family was on holiday in Cornwall. Her third given name, Endellion, is taken from the village of St Endellion near where the Camerons were holidaying.

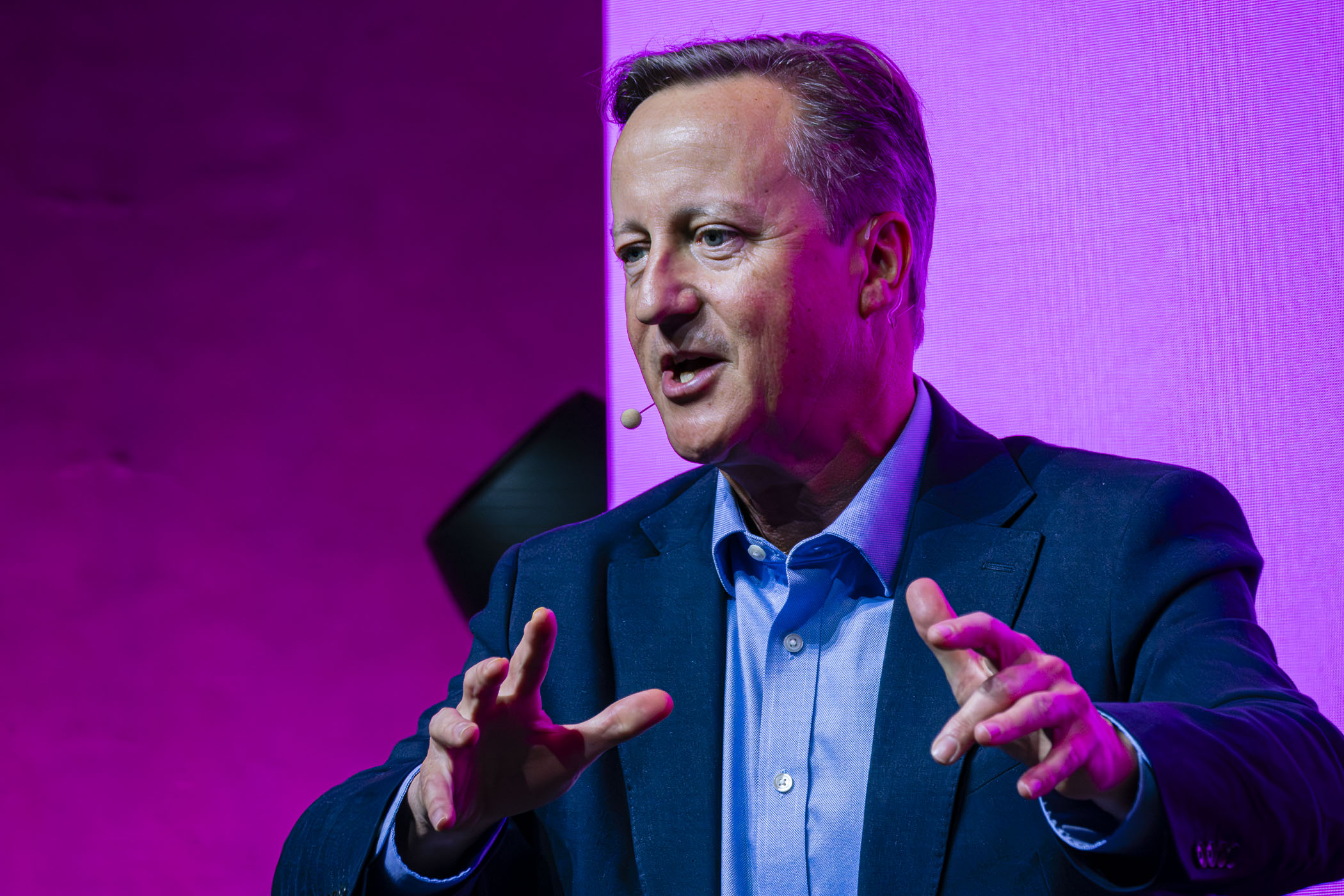
Cameron at SXSW London in June 2025.

In early May 2008, the Camerons decided to enrol their daughter Nancy at a state primary school. For three years before that, they had been attending its associated church, St Mary Abbots, near the Cameron family home in North Kensington. Cameron's constituency home is in Dean, Oxfordshire, and the Camerons have been described as key members of the Chipping Norton set.

It was announced that Cameron would miss Prime Minister's Questions on 8 September 2010 to fly to southern France to see his father, Ian Cameron, who had had a stroke with coronary complications. Later that day, his father died. Cameron attended a private ceremony for the funeral of his father on 17 September 2010 in Berkshire, which prevented him from hearing the address of Pope Benedict XVI in Westminster Hall, an occasion he would otherwise have attended. In 2012 Cameron was criticised for leaving his daughter alone in a pub. Cameron had apparently left and forgotten her.

In 2025, Cameron revealed to The Sunday Times that the previous year he had been diagnosed with prostate cancer after his wife encouraged him to get tested. Cameron added that he had undergone successful treatment to combat the disease. He has since advocated for targeted screening programmes.

=== Inheritance and family wealth ===
In October 2010, Cameron inherited £300,000 from his father's estate. Ian Cameron, who had worked as a stockbroker in the City of London, used multimillion-pound investment funds based in offshore tax havens, such as Jersey, Panama City and Geneva, to increase the family wealth. In 1982, Ian Cameron created the Panamanian Blairmore Holdings, an offshore investment fund, valued at about $20 million in 1988, "not liable to taxation on its income or capital gains", which used bearer shares until 2006.

In April 2016, following the Panama Papers financial documents leak, Cameron faced calls to resign, after it was revealed that he and his wife Samantha had invested in Ian Cameron's offshore fund. He owned £31,500 of shares in the fund and sold them for a profit of £19,000 shortly before becoming prime minister in 2010, which he paid full UK tax on. Cameron argued that the fund was set up in Panama so that people who wanted to invest in dollar-denominated shares and companies could do so, and because full UK tax was paid on all profits he made, there was no impropriety. A protest was held in London in April 2016, demanding Cameron's resignation.

In 2009 the New Statesman estimated his wealth at £3.2 million, adding that Cameron is expected to inherit "million-pound legacies" from both sides of his family.

=== Leisure ===
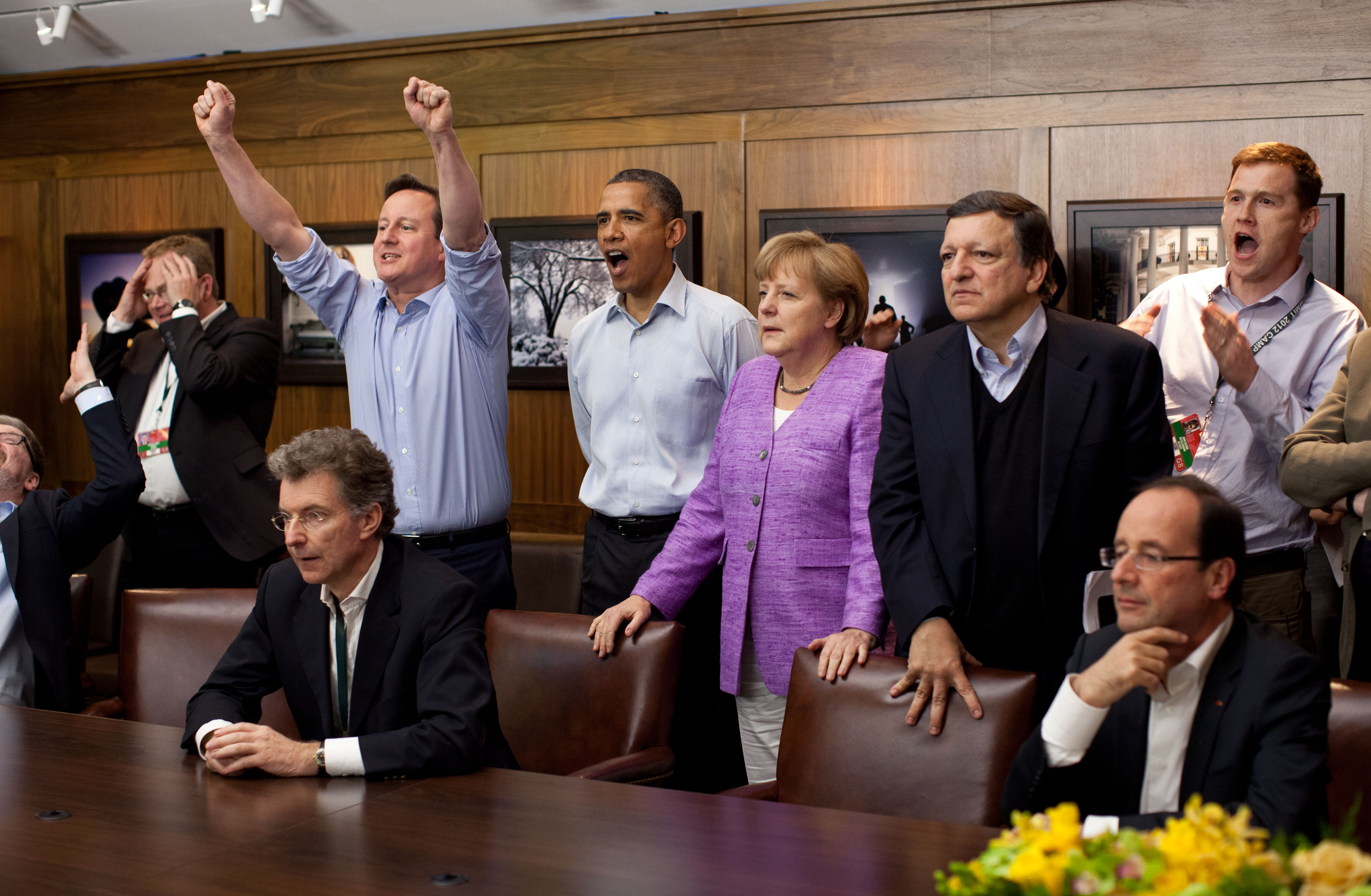
Cameron, Barack Obama, Angela Merkel, François Hollande and others watch the penalty shootout of the 2012 UEFA Champions League Final, with Cameron celebrating Chelsea's victory over Bayern Munich

Before becoming prime minister, Cameron regularly used his bicycle to commute to work. In early 2006, he was photographed cycling to work, followed by his driver in a car carrying his belongings. His Conservative Party spokesperson subsequently said that this was a regular arrangement for Cameron at the time. Cameron is an occasional jogger and in 2009 raised funds for charities by taking part in the Oxford 5K and the Great Brook Run.

Cameron supports Aston Villa. A member of MCC, he is also a keen cricket fan and has appeared on Test Match Special.

A 2012 biography, Cameron: Practically a Conservative, stated that "If 'chillaxing' was an Olympic sport then David Cameron, would win a gold medal", citing Cameron's fondness for relaxing. The biography stated that Cameron's "ability to separate his private life from his professional life is seen as an asset by some friends, and by others as a sign of complacency in the midst of a double dip recession."

=== Faith ===
At a Q&A in August 2013, Cameron described himself as a practising Christian and an active member of the Church of England. On religious faith in general, he said: "I do think that organised religion can get things wrong but the Church of England and the other churches do play a very important role in society." He said he considers the Bible "a sort of handy guide" on morality. He viewed Britain as a "Christian country", and aimed to put faith back into politics.

== Ancestry ==
Ancestors of David Cameron

16. Sir Ewen Cameron
8. Ewen Allan Cameron
17. Josephine Elizabeth Houchen
4. Ewen Donald Cameron
18. Alexander Geddes
9. Rachel Margaret Geddes
19. Frances Robertson Sharp
2. Ian Donald Cameron
20. Emilie G. C. Levita
10. Arthur Francis Levita
21. Catherine Plumridge Ree
5. Enid Agnes Maud Levita
22. Sir Alfred Cooper
11. Stephanie Agnes Cooper
23. Lady Agnes Cecil Emmeline Duff
1. David Cameron
24. Sir William George Mount
12. Sir William Arthur Mount, 1st Baronet
25. Marianne Emily Clutterbuck
6. Sir William Malcolm Mount, 2nd Baronet
26. William Malcolm Low
13. Hilda Lucy Adelaide Low
27. Lady Ida Matilda Alice Feilding
3. Mary Fleur Mount
28. Colonel Evan Henry Llewellyn
14. Owen John Llewellyn
29. Mary Blanche Somers
7. Elizabeth Nance Llewellyn
30. William John Mann
15. Anna Elizabeth Mann
31. Julia Brown

== Bibliography ==
- Cameron, David; Jones, Dylan (2008). Cameron on Cameron: Conversations with Dylan Jones. Fourth Estate. ISBN 978-0-00-728536-5.
- Cameron, David (2009). Tory Policy Making: The Conservative Research Department, 1929-2009. Conservative Research Department. ISBN 978-1-905116-04-1.
- Cameron, David (2019). For the Record. William Collins. ISBN 978-1-78517-659-3.

Parliament of the United Kingdom
Preceded by Shaun Woodward	Member of Parliament for Witney; 2001–2016	Succeeded by Robert Courts
Political offices
Preceded by David Willetts	Conservative Policy Review Coordinator; 2004–2005	Vacant Title next held by Oliver Letwin as Conservative Policy Review Chair
Preceded by Tim Collins	Shadow Secretary of State for Education and Skills; 2005	Succeeded by David Willetts
Preceded by Michael Howard	Leader of the Opposition; 2005–2010	Succeeded by Harriet Harman
Preceded by Gordon Brown	Prime Minister of the United Kingdom; 2010–2016	Succeeded by Theresa May
Preceded by Gordon Brown	Minister for the Civil Service; 2010–2016	Succeeded by Theresa May
Preceded by Gordon Brown	First Lord of the Treasury; 2010–2016	Succeeded by Theresa May
Preceded by James Cleverly	Foreign Secretary; 2023–2024	Succeeded by David Lammy
Party political offices
Preceded by Michael Howard	Leader of the Conservative Party; 2005–2016	Succeeded by Theresa May
Diplomatic posts
Preceded by Barack Obama	Chairperson of the Group of 8; 2013	Succeeded by José Manuel Barroso; Herman Van Rompuy
Orders of precedence in the United Kingdom
Preceded by The Lord Rosenfield	Gentlemen; Baron Cameron of Chipping Norton	Followed by The Lord Douglas-Miller
