= William Mount =

William Mount may refer to:

- William Sidney Mount (1807–1868), U.S. painter
- William Mount (Isle of Wight MP) (1787–1869), Member of Parliament for Yarmouth and Newport, Isle of Wight
- William George Mount (1824–1906), MP for Newbury
- Sir William Mount, 1st Baronet (1866–1930), MP for Newbury
- Sir William Mount, 2nd Baronet (1904–1993), British Army officer
- Ferdinand Mount (William Robert Ferdinand Mount, born 1939), British writer, novelist and columnist
- Willie Mount (born 1949), Louisiana politician
