= Frome by-election =

Frome by-election may refer to:

- 1853 Frome by-election
- 1854 Frome by-election
- 1856 Frome by-election
- 1876 Frome by-election
