= Donald Nicoll =

British politician, businessman, inventor and author

Member of Parliament for Frome
- In office 30 March 1857 – 3 May 1859
- Preceded by: William George Boyle
- Succeeded by: Edward Thynne

Personal details
- Born: 25 April 1820
- Died: 6 September 1891 (aged 71) Folkestone, Kent
- Cause of death: Inflammation of the stomach
- Party: Liberal
- Other political affiliations: Radical

Donald Nicoll (25 April 1820 – 6 September 1891) was a British Liberal and Radical politician, businessman, inventor and author.

== Inventions ==
Born in 1820, Nicoll started his career in trade, becoming the owner of sanitary works, as well as an inventor and maker of patented appliances for the interception and deodorization of sewage, and the filtration of water. Further, he developed improvements to fire escapes, fog signals for vessels, and electric and telegraph conductors.

In 1872, and in conjunction with Robert Sabine, ten miles of underground telegraph conductors were laid on a system he had secured a patent for. At the time of his death in 1891, he was also involved in bringing out a patent for paving roadways with hard Australian jarrah-wood, which he predicted to be cheap, clean and safe for horses.

== Political career ==
Nicoll first stood for election was a Radical candidate at Frome at a by-election in 1854—caused by the death of the sitting Whig Robert Edward Boyle. However, Nicoll was defeated by Boyle's son and the Whig candidate, Richard, by 52 votes.

At another by-election in 1856—caused by the succession of Richard Boyle to 9th Earl of Cork and Orrery—Nicoll sought the seat once more. He was this time defeated by Boyle's younger brother, William George Boyle, a Whig candidate, by just one vote.

However, at the next general election in 1857, Nicoll successfully gained the seat, defeating Boyle and the Conservative candidate, Edward Thynne, with a majority of 70 votes, or 21.5%. However, standing as a Liberal in 1859, Nicoll was unseated by Thynne with a 34.8% swing against the Liberals.

== Works ==
Nicoll was also the author of a number of books and pamphlets, including:

- Health and its Appliances (1884)
- Underground versus Overhead Wires (1887)
- The Telegraph and Telephone, considered in relation to Economy and Efficiency (1887)

== Other activities ==
Nicoll was involved in numerous areas of public life, and he was awarded for being so. He was the Sheriff of London and Middlesex in 1849, and became captain of the 29th North Middlesex Rifle Volunteer Corps in 1864. He was appointed Commissioner for the City of London to the 1867 Paris Exhibition, receiving a medal and an honourable mention for an exhibit showing the properties of bitumen as an insulating material. The 1872 Moscow Exhibition and 1873 Vienna Exhibition also awarded him medals.

He also served as a Justice of the Peace for Middlesex and Westminster, chairman of the Poor Law Amendment Society, and a life governor of many London charitable institutions. He was a member of each of the Society of Arts, the Inventors' Institute, the Spectacle-makers' Company, and the united Grand Lodge of Freemasons. In 1884, he was elected an Associate of the Institution.

Parliament of the United Kingdom
| Preceded by William George Boyle | Member of Parliament for Frome; 1857–1859 | Succeeded by Edward Thynne |
