= Frome (constituency) =

Former parliamentary constituency in the United Kingdom

- Former county constituency for the House of Commons
- County: Somerset
- Major settlements: Frome

1885–1950
- Seats: One
- Replaced by: North Somerset and Wells

1832–1885
- Seats: One
- Type of constituency: Borough constituency

Frome was a constituency centred on the town of Frome in Somerset. It returned one Member of Parliament (MP) to the House of Commons of the Parliament of the United Kingdom from 1832, until it was abolished for the 1950 general election. Between 1832 and 1885, it was a parliamentary borough; after 1885 it was a county constituency, a division of Somerset.

== History ==
Frome was one of the boroughs created by the Great Reform Act 1832, as the town was at that point one of the bigger towns in England which was not already represented, and its then-flourishing woollen manufacturing industry made it seem likely to grow further. The new borough consisted only of the town of Frome, and had a population (according to the 1831 census) of approximately 11,240. The registered electorate at the 1832 election was 322. Frome was near to Longleat, and the Marquess of Bath was influential in election outcomes throughout its life as a borough.

However, the town did not increase dramatically in size in the next few years, and the electorate was still only just over 400 by 1865, although the extension of the franchise at the 1868 election trebled this. By the time of the Third Reform Act, Frome was too small to continue as a constituency in itself and the borough was abolished with effect from the 1885 election.

The new county division into which the town was placed consisted of the whole north-eastern corner of Somerset, except for Bath, and was named after the town, as The Frome Division of Somerset. Nevertheless, Frome contributed only a minority of the voters in the constituency, which also included Weston (Bath), Radstock, Bathampton and Batheaston, to say nothing of the freeholders of Bath, who voted in this division under the arrangements that gave property owners in boroughs a vote in the adjoining county constituency; by the time of the First World War, the population was around 60,000. This constituency was a mixed one, with suburban voters at Weston and in the Bath suburbs, agricultural villages between Bath and Frome, growing mining interests round Radstock and some industry at Twerton. This made the constituency marginal between the Conservatives and Liberals, and the victor's majority was rarely more than a few hundred votes.

There were further boundary changes in 1918, when the number of constituencies in Somerset was reduced from nine to seven. Frome's boundaries were extended westwards to the fringes of Bristol, bringing in Midsomer Norton and the areas round Clutton, Chew Magna and Keynsham (previously in the Northern division): the revised constituency consisted of the urban districts of Frome, Midsomer Norton and Radstock, the Bath, Clutton and Keynsham rural districts and all but six parishes of Frome Rural District. This, too, was a marginal constituency, and except in 1923 was always won at general elections by the party which was successful nationally.

The Frome constituency was abolished in the boundary changes which came into effect at the 1950 election, Frome itself being transferred to the Wells division but most of the remainder of the constituency forming the bulk of the new Somerset North.

== Members of Parliament ==
=== Frome parliamentary borough ===
Election	Member	Party	Notes
1832	Thomas Sheppard	Whig	
1835	Thomas Sheppard	Conservative	
1847	Hon. Robert Boyle	Whig	4th son of Edmund Boyle, 8th Earl of Cork
1854 by-election	Richard Boyle, Viscount Dungarvan	Whig	later 9th Earl of Cork
1856 by-election	Hon. William Boyle	Whig	younger brother of Richard Boyle, Viscount Dungarvan
1857	Donald Nicoll	Radical	
1859	Lord Edward Thynne	Conservative	previously MP for Weobley 1826–32
1865	Sir Henry Rawlinson, Bt.	Liberal	noted orientalist, previously MP for Reigate
1868	Thomas Hughes	Liberal	author of Tom Brown's Schooldays
1874	Henry Lopes	Conservative	previously MP for Launceston, later a Lord Justice of Appeal
1876 by-election	Henry Samuelson	Liberal	previously MP for Cheltenham
1885	parliamentary borough constituency abolished, name transferred to a new county division		

=== Frome division of Somerset ===
Election	Member	Party
1885	Lawrence James Baker	Liberal
1886	Thomas Thynne, Viscount Weymouth	Conservative
1892	John Barlow	Liberal
1895	Thomas Thynne, Viscount Weymouth	Conservative
1896	Sir John Barlow	Liberal
1918	Percy Hurd	Unionist
1923	Frederick Gould	Labour
1924	Geoffrey Peto	Unionist
1929	Frederick Gould	Labour
1931	Henry Thynne, Viscount Weymouth	Conservative
1935	Mavis Tate	Conservative
1945	Walter Farthing	Labour
1950	constituency abolished	

== Elections ==
=== Elections in the 1830s ===
General election 1832: Frome
Party	Candidate	Votes	%
Whig	Thomas Sheppard	163	62.0
Whig	Sir Thomas Swymmer Mostyn-Champneys, 2nd Baronet	100	38.0
Majority		63	24.0
Turnout		263	81.7
Registered electors		322	
Whig win (new seat)			

General election 1835: Frome
Party	Candidate	Votes	%	±%
Conservative	Thomas Sheppard	100	43.7	New
Radical	Matthew Bridges	78	34.1	N/A
Whig	Courtenay Boyle	51	22.3	−15.7
Majority		22	9.6	−14.4
Turnout		229	80.4	−1.3
Registered electors		285		
Conservative gain from Whig		Swing	−1.3	

General election 1837: Frome
Party	Candidate	Votes	%	±%
Conservative	Thomas Sheppard	124	50.8	+7.1
Whig	Courtenay Boyle	120	49.2	+26.9
Majority		4	1.6	−8.0
Turnout		244	83.8	+3.4
Registered electors		291		
Conservative hold		Swing	−9.9	

=== Elections in the 1840s ===
General election 1841: Frome
Party	Candidate	Votes	%	±%
Conservative	Thomas Sheppard	154	54.4	+3.6
Whig	William Jesser Sturch	129	45.6	−3.6
Majority		25	8.8	+7.2
Turnout		283	83.2	−0.6
Registered electors		340		
Conservative hold		Swing	+3.6	

General election 1847: Frome
Party	Candidate	Votes	%	±%
Whig	Robert Edward Boyle	Unopposed		
Registered electors		412		
Whig gain from Conservative				

=== Elections in the 1850s ===
General election 1852: Frome
Party	Candidate	Votes	%	±%
Whig	Robert Edward Boyle	Unopposed		
Registered electors		383		
Whig hold				

The election was declared void on petition after Boyle was declared ineligible due to his holding of the office of Secretary to the Order of St Patrick. Ahead of the ensuing by-election, Boyle resigned this position.

By-election, 7 March 1853: Frome
Party	Candidate	Votes	%	±%
Whig	Robert Edward Boyle	Unopposed		
Whig hold				

Boyle's death caused a by-election.

By-election, 24 October 1854: Frome
Party	Candidate	Votes	%	±%
Whig	Richard Boyle	181	58.4	N/A
Radical	Donald Nicoll	129	41.6	N/A
Majority		52	16.8	N/A
Turnout		310	84.9	N/A
Registered electors		365		
Whig hold		Swing	N/A	

Boyle succeeded to the peerage, becoming 9th Earl of Cork and Orrery, causing a by-election.

By-election, 23 July 1856: Frome
Party	Candidate	Votes	%	±%
Whig	William George Boyle	158	50.2	N/A
Radical	Donald Nicoll	157	49.8	N/A
Majority		1	0.4	N/A
Turnout		315	86.1	N/A
Registered electors		366		
Whig hold		Swing	N/A	

General election 1857: Frome
Party	Candidate	Votes	%	±%
Radical	Donald Nicoll	162	49.7	N/A
Whig	William George Boyle	92	28.2	N/A
Conservative	Edward Thynne	72	22.1	New
Majority		70	21.5	N/A
Turnout		326	89.8	N/A
Registered electors		363		
Radical gain from Whig		Swing	N/A	

General election 1859: Frome
Party	Candidate	Votes	%	±%
Conservative	Edward Thynne	194	56.9	+34.8
Liberal	Donald Nicoll	147	43.1	−34.8
Majority		47	13.8	N/A
Turnout		341	88.6	−1.2
Registered electors		385		
Conservative gain from Liberal		Swing	+34.8	

=== Elections in the 1860s ===
General election 1865: Frome
Party	Candidate	Votes	%	±%
Liberal	Henry Rawlinson	206	53.0	+9.9
Conservative	James Whalley Dawe Thomas Wickham	183	47.0	−9.9
Majority		23	6.0	N/A
Turnout		389	94.0	+5.4
Registered electors		414		
Liberal gain from Conservative		Swing	+9.9	

General election 1868: Frome
Party	Candidate	Votes	%	±%
Liberal	Thomas Hughes	571	54.5	+1.5
Conservative	William Campbell Sleigh	476	45.5	−1.5
Majority		95	9.0	+3.0
Turnout		1,047	82.6	−11.4
Registered electors		1,267		
Liberal hold		Swing	+1.5	

=== Elections in the 1870s ===
General election 1874: Frome
Party	Candidate	Votes	%	±%
Conservative	Henry Lopes	642	53.5	+8.0
Liberal	William Henry Willans	557	46.5	−8.0
Majority		85	7.0	N/A
Turnout		1,199	90.4	+7.8
Registered electors		1,327		
Conservative gain from Liberal		Swing	+8.0	

Lopes resigned after being appointed a judge of the Common Pleas Division of the High Court of Justice.

By-election, 24 Nov 1876: Frome
Party	Candidate	Votes	%	±%
Liberal	Henry Samuelson	661	53.8	+7.3
Conservative	James Fergusson	568	46.2	−7.3
Majority		93	7.6	N/A
Turnout		1,229	91.0	+0.6
Registered electors		1,351		
Liberal gain from Conservative		Swing	+7.3	

=== Elections in the 1880s ===
General election 1880: Frome
Party	Candidate	Votes	%	±%
Liberal	Henry Samuelson	Unopposed		
Registered electors		1,383		
Liberal gain from Conservative				

General election 1885: Frome
Party	Candidate	Votes	%	±%
Liberal	Lawrence James Baker	4,735	54.4	N/A
Conservative	Thomas Thynne	3,972	45.6	New
Majority		763	8.8	N/A
Turnout		8,707	82.9	N/A
Registered electors		10,498		
Liberal hold		Swing	N/A	

General election 1886: Frome
Party	Candidate	Votes	%	±%
Conservative	Thomas Thynne	4,348	54.4	+8.8
Liberal	Godfrey Samuelson	3,645	45.6	−8.8
Majority		703	8.8	N/A
Turnout		7,993	76.1	−6.8
Registered electors		10,498		
Conservative gain from Liberal		Swing	+8.8	

=== Elections in the 1890s ===
General election 1892: Frome
Party	Candidate	Votes	%	±%
Liberal	John Barlow	4,747	52.7	+7.1
Conservative	Thomas Thynne	4,260	47.3	−7.1
Majority		487	5.4	N/A
Turnout		9,007	81.7	+5.6
Registered electors		11,031		
Liberal gain from Conservative		Swing	+7.1	

General election 1895: Frome
Party	Candidate	Votes	%	±%
Conservative	Thomas Thynne	5,043	52.0	+4.7
Liberal	John Barlow	4,660	48.0	−4.7
Majority		383	4.0	N/A
Turnout		9,703	83.4	+1.7
Registered electors		11,633		
Conservative gain from Liberal		Swing	+4.7	

Barlow

1896 Frome by-election
Party	Candidate	Votes	%	±%
Liberal	John Barlow	5,062	51.5	+3.5
Conservative	Alexander Thynne	4,763	48.5	−3.5
Majority		299	3.0	N/A
Turnout		9,825	83.7	+0.3
Registered electors		11,736		
Liberal gain from Conservative		Swing	+3.5	

=== Elections in the 1900s ===
Barlow

General election 1900: Frome
Party	Candidate	Votes	%	±%
Liberal	John Barlow	5,066	51.8	+3.8
Conservative	Ellis Hume-Williams	4,708	48.2	−3.8
Majority		358	3.6	N/A
Turnout		9,774	79.4	−4.0
Registered electors		12,317		
Liberal gain from Conservative		Swing	+3.8	

General election 1906: Frome
Party	Candidate	Votes	%	±%
Liberal	John Barlow	6,297	58.0	+6.2
Conservative	Charles Foxcroft	4,552	42.0	−6.2
Majority		1,745	16.0	+12.4
Turnout		10,849	86.0	+6.6
Registered electors		12,612		
Liberal hold		Swing	+6.2	

=== Elections in the 1910s ===
General election January 1910: Frome
Party	Candidate	Votes	%	±%
Liberal	John Barlow	6,248	53.3	−4.7
Conservative	Charles Foxcroft	5,469	46.7	+4.7
Majority		779	6.6	−9.4
Turnout		11,717	89.0	+3.0
Liberal hold		Swing	-4.7	

General election December 1910: Frome
Party	Candidate	Votes	%	±%
Liberal	John Barlow	5,944	52.6	−0.7
Conservative	Charles Foxcroft	5,366	47.4	+0.7
Majority		578	5.2	−1.4
Turnout		11,310	85.9	−3.1
Liberal hold		Swing	-0.7	

General Election 1914–15:

Another General Election was required to take place before the end of 1915. The political parties had been making preparations for an election to take place and by July 1914, the following candidates had been selected;

- Liberal: John Barlow
- Unionist: H. Barker-Hahlo

General election December 1918: Frome
Party		Candidate	Votes	%	±%
C	Unionist	Percy Hurd	11,118	46.6	−0.8
	Labour	Edward Gill	10,454	43.9	New
	Liberal	John Barlow	2,004	8.4	−44.2
	National	Thomas Kincaid-Smith	258	1.1	New
Majority			664	2.7	N/A
Turnout			23,834	67.7	−18.2
Registered electors			35,222		
	Unionist gain from Liberal		Swing	+21.7	
C indicates candidate endorsed by the coalition government.

=== Elections in the 1920s ===
General election 1922: Frome
Party	Candidate	Votes	%	±%
Unionist	Percy Hurd	15,017	51.2	+4.6
Labour	Edward Gill	14,311	48.8	+4.9
Majority		706	2.4	−0.3
Turnout		29,328	82.2	+14.5
Registered electors		35,698		
Unionist hold		Swing	−0.2	

General election 1923: Frome
Party	Candidate	Votes	%	±%
Labour	Frederick Gould	15,902	54.4	+5.6
Unionist	Percy Hurd	13,306	45.6	−5.6
Majority		2,596	8.8	N/A
Turnout		29,208	79.7	−2.5
Registered electors		36,628		
Labour gain from Unionist		Swing	+5.6	

General election 1924: Frome
Party	Candidate	Votes	%	±%
Unionist	Geoffrey Peto	16,397	52.8	+7.2
Labour	Frederick Gould	14,652	47.2	−7.2
Majority		1,745	5.6	N/A
Turnout		31,049	82.9	+3.2
Registered electors		37,438		
Unionist gain from Labour		Swing	+7.2	

General election 1929: Frome
Party	Candidate	Votes	%	±%
Labour	Frederick Gould	18,524	45.5	−1.7
Unionist	Geoffrey Peto	16,378	40.3	−12.5
Liberal	Colin Stratton-Hallett	5,774	14.2	New
Majority		2,146	5.2	N/A
Turnout		40,676	86.5	+3.6
Registered electors		47,039		
Labour gain from Unionist		Swing	+5.4	

=== Elections in the 1930s ===
General election 1931: Frome
Party	Candidate	Votes	%	±%
Conservative	Henry Thynne	24,858	58.3	+18.0
Labour	Frederick Gould	17,748	41.7	−3.8
Majority		7,110	16.6	N/A
Turnout		42,606	87.3	+0.8
Conservative gain from Labour		Swing	+10.9	

General election 1935: Frome
Party	Candidate	Votes	%	±%
Conservative	Mavis Tate	19,684	46.3	−12.0
Labour	Kim Mackay	18,690	43.9	+2.2
Liberal	Philip William Hopkins	4,177	9.8	New
Majority		994	2.4	−14.2
Turnout		42,551	82.5	−4.8
Conservative hold		Swing	-7.1	

General Election 1939–40:

Another General Election was required to take place before the end of 1940. The political parties had been making preparations for an election to take place and by the Autumn of 1939, the following candidates had been selected;

- Conservative: Guy Dalrymple Fanshawe
- Labour: Kim Mackay
- British Union: Charles Hewitt

=== Elections in the 1940s ===
General election 1945: Frome
Party	Candidate	Votes	%	±%
Labour	Walter Farthing	29,735	55.1	+11.2
Conservative	Mavis Tate	24,228	44.9	−1.4
Majority		5,507	10.2	N/A
Turnout		53,963	78.4	−4.1
Labour gain from Conservative		Swing	+6.8	
