= 1922 Newbury by-election =

UK Parliamentary by-election

The 1922 Newbury by-election was held on 10 June 1922. The by-election was held due to the resignation of the incumbent Coalition Conservative MP, William Mount. It was won by the Coalition Conservative candidate Howard Clifton Brown.
