= Percy Hurd =

British politician

Sir Percy Hurd
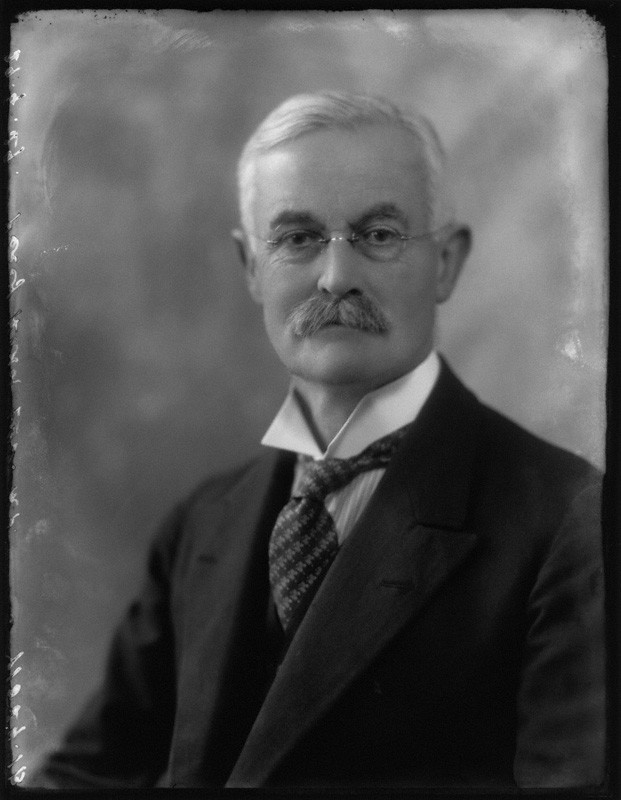

Member of Parliament for Devizes
- In office 29 October 1924 – 15 June 1945
- Preceded by: Eric Macfadyen
- Succeeded by: Christopher Hollis

Member of Parliament for Frome
- In office 14 December 1918 – 16 November 1923
- Preceded by: Sir John Barlow, Bt.
- Succeeded by: Frederick Gould

Personal details
- Born: 18 May 1864
- Died: 5 June 1950 (aged 86)
- Spouse: Hannah (m. 1893; died 1949)
- Children: 4, including Robert, and Anthony

Sir Percy Angier Hurd (18 May 1864 – 5 June 1950) was a British journalist and Conservative Party politician who served as a Member of Parliament for nearly thirty years. He was the first of four generations of Hurds to serve as Conservative MPs.

== Writing career ==
Percy Hurd was editor of The Outlook, a weekly magazine published in London from 1898 to 1928. He later became editor of the Canadian Gazette and London editor of the Montreal Star and other journals in Canada. During the First World War he made various visits to the battle-front to study and record the work of the Canadian contingent. He was also a member of the executive committee of the Agricultural Relief of Allies Fund, and twice reported on the needs of the farmers in the provinces of France from which the Germans had been pushed back.

Hurd was a fervent advocate of the British Empire, and wrote several books on the subject, including one written jointly with his brother Archibald (later Sir Archibald Hurd, a naval critic who was editor of the Naval and Military Record from 1896–1899 and then a journalist with the Daily Telegraph until 1928.

== Political career ==
Hurd was first elected to the House of Commons at the 1918 general election as the Coalition Conservative MP for the Frome division of Somerset. The seat had been held by the Liberal Party for all but nine of the preceding fifty years, but Hurd's possession of the "coalition coupon" issued to supporters of David Lloyd George's Liberal-Conservative coalition government combined with a strong showing from a Labour Party candidate allowed him to win the seat, ousting Sir John Barlow who had represented Frome since 1896. At the 1922 general election, Hurd faced only a Labour opponent, and was re-elected with a modest majority of only 2.4% of the votes. However, at the 1923 general election, Frome was one of many seats won by the Labour Party.

Hurd did not stand again in Frome; at the next general election in October 1924 he stood instead in the Devizes division of Wiltshire, a Conservative-leaning constituency which had been gained by the Liberals in 1923. Hurd took the seat with a majority of over 20% of the vote, and remained as MP for Devizes until he retired from Parliament at the 1945 general election.

He was knighted in the 1932 King's Birthday Honours, "for political and public services".

According to his grandson Douglas Hurd, Percy "wasn't very political. He used to go round villages in Wiltshire telling funny stories."

== Family ==
In 1893 Percy married Hannah (died 1949), daughter of Rev. William Jackson Cox, of Dundee, Angus, Scotland, and they had four children:

- Robert Philip Andrew Hurd (1905–1963), an architect.
- Anthony Richard Hurd (1901–1966), a farmer and agricultural journalist who followed his father into politics and served as MP for Newbury from 1945 to 1964. Anthony was knighted in 1959 and became a life peer in 1964.
- Douglas William Hurd (c.1895–1916), a Captain in the Middlesex Regiment who was killed in the First World War.
- Angier Percy Hurd (1897–1918), a Lieutenant in the Hertfordshire Regiment who was killed during the German spring offensive in the First World War.

Anthony's eldest son Douglas, was an MP from 1974 to 1997 (for Mid Oxfordshire and then Witney), rising to become Home Secretary and then Foreign Secretary; he was made a life peer in 1997. Douglas's son Nick (born 1962) was MP for Ruislip-Northwood from 2005 to 2019.

== Publications ==
- Hurd, Percy Angier, ed. (1900). People you know; being portraits of some of the men and women of to-day.
- Hurd, Percy Angier; Hurd, Archibald (1915). The new empire partnership: defence – commerce – policy.
- Hurd, Percy (1915). The fighting territorials.
- Borden, Robert Laird, Sir (1917). Hurd, Percy (ed.). The war and the future, being a narrative compiled from speeches delivered at various periods of the war in Canada, the United States, and Great Britain, with an introductory letter to the compiler, Percy Hurd.
- Hurd, Percy (1918). Canada past, present and future.
- Hurd, Percy (1924). The Empire: a Family Affair. London: Philip Allan & Co.

Parliament of the United Kingdom
Preceded by Sir John Barlow, Bt.	Member of Parliament for Frome; 1918 – 1923	Succeeded by Frederick Gould
Preceded by Eric Macfadyen	Member of Parliament for Devizes; 1924 – 1945	Succeeded by Christopher Hollis
