= Anna, Lady Barlow =

English politician, pacifist and suffragist (1873–1965)

- Born: 28 September 1873; Liverpool, England
- Died: 28 May 1965 (aged 91)
- Occupations: politician, pacifist, suffragist and temperance activist
- Organization: Band of Hope Union
- Political party: Liberal Party (UK); National Liberal Party
- Spouse: John Emmott Barlow (m. 1895)
- Children: 4
- Relatives: Thomas Denman, 3rd Baron Denman (brother)

The Honourable Anna Maria Heywood, Lady Barlow (28 September 1873 – 28 May 1965) was an English Liberal Party politician, pacifist, suffragist and temperance activist.

== Education and family ==
Anna Maria Heywood Denman was born on 28 September 1873 in Liverpool. Her brother was Thomas Denman, 3rd Baron Denman.

In 1895, she married John Emmott Barlow, the Liberal MP for Frome in Somerset and senior partner in his family businesses with principal interests in textiles, tea and coffee and rubber. They had two sons and two daughters.

Her son John Barlow who succeeded his father to become the second baronet was Liberal candidate for Northwich in 1929. He later became a National Liberal representing Eddisbury from 1945–1950 and then a fully fledged Conservative being MP for Middleton and Prestwich from 1951–1966. In religion, Sir John and Lady Barlow were Quakers, Lady Barlow having converted to that denomination in about 1911.

Barlow in 1924

== Politics ==
Lady Barlow was a steadfast companion to her husband in his Somerset constituency over many years. She shared his political interests and campaigned with him and on his behalf. The couple were close friends of Liberal Prime Minister Henry Campbell-Bannerman.

Lady Barlow also stood in her own right for election to the House of Commons twice as a Liberal. First she contested the Derbyshire, High Peak division at the 1922 general election. At this election only thirty-three women were selected as candidates out of 1,387 contenders for the House of Commons’ 615 seats and only two, the Tory Nancy Astor, Viscountess Astor and the Liberal Margaret Wintringham were elected. Lady Barlow came third at High Peak in a three-cornered contest with 20% of the vote.

General Election 1922 Electorate 34,242
Party	Candidate	Votes	%	±%
Unionist	Sir Samuel Hill Hill-Wood	14,892	52.5	−6.3
Labour	Frank Anderson	7,698	27.1	n/a
Liberal	Hon. Lady Anna Barlow	5,802	20.4	
Majority		7,194	25.4	
Turnout			82.9	+20.6
Unionist hold		Swing		

She next fought the nearby seat of Ilkeston at the 1924 general election. The number of women candidates was growing now but there was a still a real sense in which they were pioneers. Overall only forty-one women were chosen to stand for election and Lady Barlow was one of only six female candidates out of a total of 333 Liberal hopefuls. Again she came third in a three-cornered race.

General Election 1924: Ilkeston Electorate 32,243
Party	Candidate	Votes	%	±%
Labour	George Harold Oliver	11,011	44.9	+2.8
Unionist	Henry Victor Alpin MacKinnon Raikes	9,203	37.5	+7.5
Liberal	Hon. Lady Anna Barlow	4,320	17.6	−10.3
Majority		1,808	7.4	−4.7
Turnout			76.1	+6.7
Labour hold		Swing	-2.4	

A champion of the political rights of women, Lady Barlow was also a strong supporter of the traditional Liberal policy of free trade and shared her husband's close interest in labour affairs.

In her later life during the 1950s and 60s, at a time when the Liberal Party had declined in public affections, Lady Barlow seems to have transferred her political allegiance to the National Liberals. Her son, the second baronet, was a National Liberal and later a Conservative MP. She does not appear to have been politically active in campaigning for National Liberal candidates but did support a large number of their social and fundraising functions, as well as attending talks at meetings of the National Liberal Forum.

== Welfare reformer ==
Lady Barlow was active in a number of different fields of moral, welfare and political reform. For 22 years she was President of the Lancashire and Cheshire Band of Hope Union an organisation dedicated to teaching and impressing upon children the importance and principles of sobriety and teetotalism. In addition, she appeared as a speaker for other temperance groups including The Young Abstainers Union.

Outside her own electoral campaigning, Lady Barlow supported for the cause of women's suffrage and as a Quaker she was a campaigner for peace and disarmament. She and her husband opposed the introduction of conscription both before and more crucially during World War I, and sent their two sons to a Quaker college in the United States. Lady Barlow particularly tried to promote peaceful international relations and reconciliation during and after the Great War. In 1923, she led an appeal for the German Distress Relief Fund.

She maintained an extensive correspondence with influential figures throughout Europe and maintained a speaking schedule at related events at home such as the Peacemakers’ Pilgrimage Rally in Hyde Park in 1926.

== Papers ==
A number of Lady Barlow's papers and letters are contained in the Barlow Collection deposited in the Cambridge University Library, Manuscripts Departments.
