= 1896 Frome by-election =

UK parliamentary by-election

The 1896 Frome by-election, was a by-election held on 2 June 1896 for the House of Commons of the United Kingdom.

The by-election was called when the incumbent Viscount Weymouth entered the House of Lords as the 5th Marquess of Bath in 1896 on the death of his father. Weymouth had been the Member of Parliament for Frome between 1886 and 1892 and from 1895 to 1896.

Weymouth's brother Alexander Thynne stood as the Conservative Party candidate against the Liberal Party candidate John Barlow. The constituency had changed from Conservative to Liberal parties a number of times and Barlow had lost the seat at the 1895 General Election to Viscount Weymouth who had a majority of 383.

== Result ==
Barlow was elected the Member for Frome with majority of 299.

1896 Frome by-election
Party	Candidate	Votes	%	±%
Liberal	John Barlow	5,062	51.5	+3.5
Conservative	Alexander Thynne	4,763	48.5	−3.5
Majority		299	3.0	N/A
Turnout		9,825	83.7	+0.3
Registered electors		11,736		
Liberal gain from Conservative		Swing	+3.5	
