= Frederick Coleridge Mackarness =

British barrister, judge and Liberal politician

Frederic Mackarness

Frederic(k) Michael Coleridge Mackarness (31 August 1854 – 23 December 1920) born at Tardebigge, Saint Bartholomew, Worcestershire, England was a British barrister, judge and Liberal politician and Member of Parliament for the Newbury constituency.

== Family and education ==
Mackarness was the son of the Right Reverend John Fielder Mackarness, who was Bishop of Oxford from 1870 to 1888 and Alethea Buchanan Coleridge. He was educated at Marlborough College and Keble College, Oxford. In 1882 he married Amy Chermside, the daughter of an Anglican vicar . They do not appear to have had children. Amy Mackarness died in 1916.

== Career ==
Mackarness went in for the law and was called to the Bar at the Middle Temple in 1879. He practised as an advocate of the Cape Supreme Court for some years, was appointed Revising Barrister for Harrow, Middlesex in 1889 and for London in the same year – Revising Barristers were Counsel of not less than three years standing (and from 1873, of not less than seven years' standing) appointed to revise the lists of parliamentary voters. He was appointed Recorder of Newbury in 1894 and was Professor of Roman-Dutch Law at University College, London from 1905 to 1906. In 1911, he was given a County Court judgeship in Sussex.

== Politics ==
Liberal politics were a part of Mackarness' family. His sister Mary was married to Bernard Coleridge, another barrister of the Middle Temple, who was Liberal MP for Sheffield Attercliffe from 1885 to 1894. His father was also a Liberal and his appointment as Bishop of Oxford was on the recommendation of William E. Gladstone.

In 1903, Mackarness resigned from his position as Recorder of Newbury to become the prospective Liberal parliamentary candidate. Newbury was a traditionally Conservative seat. Since its creation in 1885 it had been represented first by William George Mount and then by his son William Arthur Mount for the Tories. David Cameron who became Prime Minister at the 2010 general election is descended from the Mount family. At the 1900 general election William Arthur Mount was returned unopposed.

However. Mackarness was elected as MP for Newbury at the 1906 general election narrowly beating Mount by 402 votes. He was an active member of the House of Commons.

Very shortly after his election in April 1906 he was the sponsor of a Private Members Bill - The Housing of the Working Classes Acts Amendment Bill which sought to reorganise the provision of housing for the working classes in rural areas. Whilst the Bill itself was unsuccessful it resulted in a Select Committee Report which set out significant and wide ranging proposals to reform the legislation. Subsequently the Liberal Government enacted the Housing of the Working Classes Act 1909 which resulted in systematic inspection of the condition of working class housing and the provision of council housing in many places, particularly in rural areas in the period up to the start of the First World War.

While in Parliament he took up the cause of Chinese Labour in South Africa and campaigned on behalf of native Indians and their civil rights. In 1910, in his role as chairman of the executive of the India Civil Rights Committee, he published a pamphlet entitled Methods of the Indian Police in the 20th Century in which he showed, by quoting official reports, that untried prisoners were tortured to extort evidence. This document was suppressed by the Provincial Governments in India under the Press Act of 1912 and the resulting controversy caused a rift between Mackarness and his sympathetic supporters in the Liberal press and Edwin Montagu who was the Under-Secretary of State for India. Apart from his interest in the issue of so-called coolie labour, Mackarness drew on his experience in South Africa to comment regularly on matters affecting the British colonies there over the years. In 1902 he published Martial Law in the Cape Colony during 1901 and was a member of the South African Conciliation Committee, a British anti-war organisation opposed to the suffering caused by the Second Boer War and dedicated to bringing the war to an end through negotiation. Mackarness was also noted as an 'indefatigable' supporter of Irish Home Rule.

In 1909, Mackarness told his constituency Liberal Association that "for private reasons" he did not intend to fight the next election. The seat reverted to the Conservatives by a wide margin, William Arthur Mount recording a majority of 2,358 over the new Liberal candidate, Thomas Hedderwick the former MP for Wick Burghs.

== Death ==
Mackarness died in London on 23 December 1920 and his funeral took place in Eastbourne on 3 January 1921.

Parliament of the United Kingdom
Preceded by William Arthur Mount	Member of Parliament for Newbury; 1906 – January 1910	Succeeded by William Arthur Mount
