= William George Boyle =

British soldier and politician

The Honourable William George Boyle (12 August 1830 – 24 March 1908) was a British soldier and Liberal Party politician.

Boyle was the second son of Charles Boyle, Viscount Dungarvan, second but eldest surviving son of Edmund Boyle, 8th Earl of Cork. His mother was Lady Catherine St Lawrence while Richard Boyle, 9th Earl of Cork, was his elder brother. Boyle served with the Coldstream Guards and achieved the rank of lieutenant-colonel. In 1856 he succeeded his elder brother as Member of Parliament for Frome, a seat he held until the following year. He was also a Justice of the Peace for Somerset.

Boyle died in March 1908, aged 77. He never married.

== Notes ==
Parliament of the United Kingdom
Preceded by Viscount Dungarvan	Member of Parliament for Frome; 1856–1857	Succeeded by Donald Nicoll
