= Harold Stranger =

British barrister and politician

Innes Harold Stranger KC MP (21 June 1879 – 28 July 1936) was a British Barrister and Liberal politician who was briefly Member of Parliament for the Newbury constituency.

== Family and education ==
Stranger was born in Islington a son of Innes Thomas Stranger of Worthing. He was educated privately and read law. In 1907 he married Milly Norah Tunbridge, daughter of J.B. Tunbridge JP of Hythe, in Elham, Kent. In 1909 he was called to the Bar by the Middle Temple. His daughter, Yvonne Stranger, also a Barrister (called 1933), married William Charles Osman Hill in 1947.

== Political career ==
In the 1922 general election Stranger unsuccessfully fought the Newbury seat for the Liberal Party. In 1923 he was elected to the seat in the general election of 1923 with a majority of just 41 votes over his Conservative opponent in a two-party contest. In Parliament he allied with the left of the Liberal Party. In October 1924 with 12 other Liberal MPs, he refused to join the majority of the party in voting for a motion which the Labour government had declared a motion of no confidence and backed the government instead. However this rebellion was not sufficient to save it. In 1924 in the ensuing general election, Labour decided to run a candidate against him and he lost the seat back to the Conservative opponent whom he had beaten in 1923. Up to 1929 he continued as prospective Liberal candidate for Newbury but did not contest the general election of that year.

== Professional career ==
In 1901 Stranger started work in the city. From 1909 he practiced as a Barrister in the commercial and Admiralty Courts. In February 1933 he became a King's Counsel. In January 1936 he was appointed Recorder of Sunderland, a part-time Judgeship.

== Travel ==
Stranger travelled in America and the Near East on which subject he had written. While on an overseas trip in 1930 he was flying from Johannesburg to Victoria Falls when the aircraft developed difficulties and had to land in a jungle clearing.

== Death ==
In July 1936, aged 57, he died of a sudden heart attack while at work.

Parliament of the United Kingdom
Preceded by Howard Clifton Brown	Member of Parliament for Newbury; 1923–1924	Succeeded by Howard Clifton Brown
