= Ted Gill =

British socialist activist

Edward H. C. Gill (1879 – 1923), often known as Ted Gill was a British socialist activist.

Gill was born in Leominster in Herefordshire; his family moved to Abertillery in Wales when he was ten years old. He left school and worked, becoming a coal miner five years later. Despite his shyness, he came to prominence in the South Wales Miners' Federation, which sponsored him to study at Ruskin College from 1907 to 1909. While at Oxford, he was a founder member of the Plebs' League, and thereafter frequently spoke in favour of workers' education. He also joined the Independent Labour Party (ILP) and devoted much time to it, arguing in favour of the nationalisation of the mines.

Like most of the ILP, Gill initially opposed World War I, stating that "unless strenuous efforts are made to organise anti-war feeling, we are on the eve of a holocaust too terrible for contemplation". Within days, however, he changed his mind, joining the 10th South Wales Borderers. Unexpectedly, he received a commission as a second lieutenant, and also qualified as a machine gun instructor before sailing to France at the end of 1915. While in the trenches at Festubert, he crawled into no man's land three times. He organised a retreat of troops at the advanced posts, and then rescued an injured soldier, for which action he was awarded the Military Cross. He was badly wounded at Mametz Wood, leading troops forward, and suffered further wounds on a stretcher. As a result of his injuries, he was invalided out, with the rank of captain.

After the war, Gill suffered ongoing poor health. He devoted his time to the Labour Party, standing in Frome at the 1918 United Kingdom general election. Although he did not win the seat, the party saw his potential as a propagandist, specifically to counter the charge that the party was unpatriotic. For the 1922 United Kingdom general election, he worked with J. W. Kneeshaw and William F. Toynbee, speaking across the country, with his focus being the south west of England. He also stood again in Frome, this time taking 48.8% of the vote and a very close second place.

Gill travelled to campaign for the Labour Party in the 1923 Morpeth by-election, but the strain on his health led to his death.
