= 1854 Frome by-election =

UK parliamentary by-election

- 23 October 1854

Frome seat in the House of Commons. Election by simple majority using first past the post. Triggered by death of incumbent
Candidate	Viscount Dungarvan	Donald Nicoll
Party	Whig	Radical
- Map showing the town of Frome within the English county of Somerset, and Somerset within England
Incumbent MP
Robert Edward Boyle
Liberal

The 1854 Frome by-election was a parliamentary by-election held in England on 24 October 1854 for the UK House of Commons constituency of Frome, a parliamentary borough in Somerset.

== Vacancy ==
The vacancy had been caused by the death of the borough's 45-year-old Liberal MP Colonel Robert Edward Boyle, who had held the seat since the 1847 general election. Serving with the Coldstream Guards in the Crimean War, he died of fever in Varna, and was buried at sea.

Boyle had been returned opposed in 1847 and in 1852, and was also unopposed at the by-election in 1853 which followed the annulment on petition of the 1852 result.

== Candidates ==
Two candidates were nominated. Donald Nicoll was a tailor from London, and a former Sheriff of London. Richard Boyle, Viscount Dungarvan was a grandson of the 8th Earl of Cork, and a nephew of the late MP Robert Edward Boyle.

The Earls of Cork had long dominated the borough in alliance with the Conservative-supporting Marquess of Bath, but their support for Dungarvan was controversial. At the West Somerset by-election in 1851, Dungarvan had stood as a Conservative, opposed to the Liberal government of Lord John Russell. He had staunchly opposed the Liberal principle of free trade, and Liberal opinion in Frome was further alarmed by tractarian support for Dungarvan. Nicoll had issued a statement supporting Liberal principles, and was invited to stand. He rapidly became the leading candidate.

A Mr Curling from Southwark also addressed the voters, but soon abandoned his campaign and left Frome.

== Election ==
The secret ballot was not used in British parliamentary elections until the passage of the Ballot Act 1872, so elections were still held in public. That was one of the many points of difference between the two candidates in Frome, with Nicoll supporting secret ballots while Dungarvan preferred public polls.

The election in Frome began on Saturday 21 October, amidst such an uproar from the crowd that even those closest to speakers were unable to hear all that they said. Once the nomination formalities had been completed, both candidates addressed the crowd. Dungarvan spoke of his family's long history association with Frome, and how a secret ballot was un-needed because the townspeople were "not slaves". He derided Nicoll's claim to have given employment to the town, saying it was the "toil and sweat of the poor man" which allowed Nicoll to travel in such style from Regent Street.

When it was Nicoll's turn to speak, the majority of the crowd cheered him. He proclaimed that he had always had been a free trader, and remained so. He was opposed to unfair and excessive taxation, and had no titled relatives to be supported by public sinecures. He said that while canvassing, the vast majority of those to whom he had spoken supported a secret ballot, and that all other reforms would be undermined without it.

On a show of hands, the vast majority of those present supported Nicoll. However, Lord Dungarvan demanded a poll, which was set for Monday 23 October.

Voting took place throughout the day on Monday, amidst scenes of disorder which The Times reported as involving "innumerable broken windows, and not a few broken heads". By 9am, Dungarvan had established a lead of 9 votes out of the 131 cast, and by the close of poll at 4pm his total of 181 votes was 52 ahead of Nicoll's 129. The disorder escalated, and at 7.15pm the Riot Act was read, and a unit of yeomanry with swords drawn entered the town to disperse the crowd.

== Aftermath ==
Dungarvan held the seat for less than two years, before he succeeded to the peerage in 1856. This triggered another by-election, at which Nicoll was again an unsuccessful candidate, losing by only 1 vote.

Nicoll went on to win the seat at the 1857 general election, serving as Frome's MP for two years.

== See also ==
- 1853 Frome by-election
- 1856 Frome by-election
- 1876 Frome by-election
