= Geoffrey Peto =

Geoffrey Kelsall Peto (8 September 1878 – 8 January 1956) was a British Conservative Party politician and member of parliament (MP). In business, he became a director of the industrial firm Morgan Crucible Company.

At the 1923 general election, he stood unsuccessfully in the Louth constituency in Lincolnshire. The following year, in the 1924 general election, he was elected member of parliament for Frome in Somerset, but lost the seat in the general election of 1929. His maiden speech was a warning about the dangers of Communist propagandists. He retained his antipathy towards Communism and Communists writing to the Daily Telegraph in the wake of the defections of Burgess and MacLean.

He was the son of W.H. Peto of Dukinty, Elgin.

Peto was returned to the House of Commons at the 1931 general election for the Bilston constituency in Wolverhampton winning with a majority of 3773, and retired from Parliament at the 1935 election. During this period, he acted as Parliamentary Private Secretary to Walter Runciman, the President of the Board of Trade. In 1936 he became Chairman of the Food Council and Consumers' Committee and at periods was Chairman of the Gift Coupon Committee, the International Copyright Committee and the Committee on Pensions for Unmarried Women.

In 1938, Peto served as a member of the Runciman Mission to Czechoslovakia. From 1941 to 1945 he was the Regional Controller, Ministry of Supply for Southern England having previously operated as deputy and interim Commissioner for the SW Civil Defence Region at the outset of the war.

After the war his interests included the Invalid Kitchens of London and the Dorset School of Occupational Therapy, and the Central Council for the Care of Cripples.

He was married from 1903 to Pauline, the daughter of William Quirin of Boston Massachusetts. She had one son from her first marriage to Lieutenant Colonel Cockayne-Frith who was killed in action in 1940. She died following an operation in 1950. The following year he married American born Lady Edna Cope, widow of Capt. Sir Denzil Cope who survived him along with an aon and a daughter from his first marriage . He died at his home at No. 3 Wellesley House, Sloane Square in London.

Charles Tennyson (civil servant) dedicated a book to him and their long friendship.

Parliament of the United Kingdom
Preceded by Frederick Gould	Member of Parliament for Frome; 1924–1929	Succeeded by Frederick Gould
Preceded by John Baker	Member of Parliament for Bilston; 1931–1935	Succeeded by Ian Hannah
