= Robert Boyle, 11th Earl of Cork =

Robert John Lascelles Boyle, 11th Earl of Cork and 11th Earl of Orrery (8 November 1864 – 13 October 1934), known as Hon. Robert Boyle until 1925, was a British peer.

The second son of Richard Boyle, 9th Earl of Cork and Lady Emily de Burgh, he was educated at Charterhouse School. Boyle was commissioned a lieutenant in the 4th (2nd Somerset Militia) Battalion, Somerset Light Infantry, on 15 April 1882, and resigned his commission on 12 February 1887. From 1888, he was honorary attaché at Madrid. He married Josephine Catherine Hale (d. 2 April 1953), daughter of a California merchant, on 30 April 1890; they had no children.

During the First World War, he was the honorary secretary of the British Club for Belgian Soldiers, an organization to provide recreation and refreshment for Belgian soldiers on furlough from the front lines. As a result, he was made an officer in the Belgian Order of the Crown. He was also made a knight of the Order of Saints Maurice and Lazarus for war services.

In 1925, he succeeded his brother Charles as Earl of Cork and Orrery. He died in 1934 and was succeeded by his second cousin William.

Peerage of Ireland
Preceded by Charles Boyle	Earl of Cork; Earl of Orrery; 1925–1934	Succeeded by William Boyle
