= Howard Clifton Brown =

British army officer and Conservative Party politician

Brigadier-General Howard Clifton Brown DL JP

Member of Parliament for Newbury
- In office 1924–1945
- Preceded by: Sir William Mount
- Succeeded by: Harold Stranger
- In office 1922–1923
- Preceded by: Harold Stranger
- Succeeded by: Anthony Hurd

Personal details
- Born: 3 April 1868
- Died: 11 September 1946 (aged 78)
- Party: Conservative
- Spouse: Mary Eirene Hodges (after 1903)
- Relations: Douglas Clifton Brown, 1st Viscount Ruffside (brother); Sir Alexander Brown, 1st Baronet (uncle); Geoffrey Clifton-Brown (nephew)
- Children: 3
- Parent(s): James Clifton Brown; Amelia Rowe Brown

Brigadier-General Howard Clifton Brown (3 April 1868 – 11 September 1946) was a British Army officer and Conservative Party politician who served as the Member of Parliament (MP) for Newbury.

== Early life ==
Brown was born on 3 April 1868. He was the eldest son of ten children born to James Clifton Brown, by his wife Amelia (née Rowe) Brown, who was of African descent. His younger brother, Douglas Clifton Brown, served as Speaker of the House of Commons and was later elevated to the Peerage of the United Kingdom as Viscount Ruffside. A nephew, Geoffrey Clifton-Brown, also served in Parliament.

His paternal grandparents were Alexander Brown and his wife Sarah Benedict Brown. His great-grandfather was the banker and merchant Sir William Brown, 1st Baronet, and his uncle was Liberal politician Sir Alexander Brown, 1st Baronet.

== Career ==
He was commissioned into the 12th Lancers as a second-lieutenant on 8 June 1889, promoted to lieutenant on 3 September 1890, and to captain on 1 October 1896. He served with the regiment in the Second Boer War in South Africa 1899–1901, where he took part in the Relief of Kimberley (15 February 1900) and the subsequent battles of Paardeberg (February 1900) and Driefontein (March 1900); and from June to November 1900 in operations in the Transvaal. For his service, he was promoted brevet major in the 1901 South Africa Honours list (the promotion was dated 29 November 1900). He received the substantive rank of major on 3 September 1902.

From 1908 to 1912 he was commander of the 12th Lancers. He was promoted on 7 March 1912 to colonel before he was given command of the South Eastern Mounted Brigade 1913-16 and served in the First World War. He resigned as brigadier general, a rank he was promoted to on 5 August 1914.

=== Member of Parliament ===
Clifton Brown was elected to the House of Commons for Newbury at an unopposed by-election on 6 June 1922. However, in the following year's general election he lost the seat by just 41 votes to his Liberal opponent, Innes Harold Stranger.

At the 1924 general election he was re-elected as Newbury's MP, which he remained until stepping down at the 1945 general election.

== Personal life ==
In 1903, he was married to Mary Eirene Hodges, daughter of Sir Henry Hodges. Together, Mary and Howard were the parents of three daughters.

Parliament of the United Kingdom
Preceded by William Mount	Member of Parliament for Newbury; 1922–1923	Succeeded by Harold Stranger
Preceded by Harold Stranger	Member of Parliament for Newbury; 1924–1945	Succeeded by Anthony Hurd
