= Anthony Hurd, Baron Hurd =

British politician

The Right Honourable The Lord Hurd
- Hurd in 1964, by Walter Bird

Member of Parliament for Newbury
- In office 5 July 1945 – 24 August 1964
- Preceded by: Howard Clifton Brown
- Succeeded by: John Astor

Personal details
- Born: 2 May 1901
- Died: 12 February 1966 (aged 64)
- Party: Conservative
- Spouse: Stephanie Frances Corner
- Children: 3, including Douglas Hurd
- Parent(s): Percy Hurd; Hannah Cox
- Relatives: Robert Hurd (brother); Nick Hurd (grandson)
- Education: Pembroke College, Cambridge

Anthony Richard Hurd, Baron Hurd (2 May 1901 – 12 February 1966) was a British politician and former Conservative member of parliament for Newbury.

== Early life and parliamentary career ==
Hurd was educated at Marlborough College and Pembroke College, Cambridge, where he was a contemporary of Rab Butler. He was first elected to the Newbury constituency in the 1945 general election and won each successive election in Newbury until he was appointed to the House of Lords just before the 1964 general election. He was knighted for his political service in 1959.

== Life peerage ==
On 24 August 1964 he was created a Life Peer as Baron Hurd, of Newbury in the Royal County of Berks which entitled him to a seat in the House of Lords. He died 18 months later at the age of 64.

== Family ==
His father, Sir Percy Hurd, was MP for Devizes, his brother was Robert Hurd (architect); his son, Douglas now Lord Hurd of Westwell, was MP for Mid-Oxfordshire and former Foreign Secretary. His grandson, Nick Hurd was MP for Ruislip Northwood and Pinner from 2005 to 2019.

== Personal life ==
Hurd married on 26 September 1928 Stephanie Frances Corner daughter of Edred Moss Corner who was invested as a Fellow, Royal College of Surgeons (F.R.C.S.) and they had three children.

- Douglas Richard Hurd, Baron Hurd of Westwell CH CBE PC (1930–)

British Conservative politician who served in the governments of Margaret Thatcher and John Major from 1979 to 1995.

- John Julian Hurd (1932–1951)
- Honourable Stephen Anthony Hurd (1933–2019)

Parliament of the United Kingdom
Preceded by Howard Clifton Brown	Member of Parliament for Newbury; 1945 – 1964	Succeeded by John Astor
