= Robert Hurd =

British architect (1905–1963)

- Born: Robert Philip Andrew Hurd; 5 July 1905
- Died: 17 September 1963 (aged 58)
- Education: University of Cambridge
- Occupation: Architect
- Movement: Scottish Renaissance
- Parent(s): Percy Hurd; Hannah Cox
- Relatives: Anthony Hurd (brother)

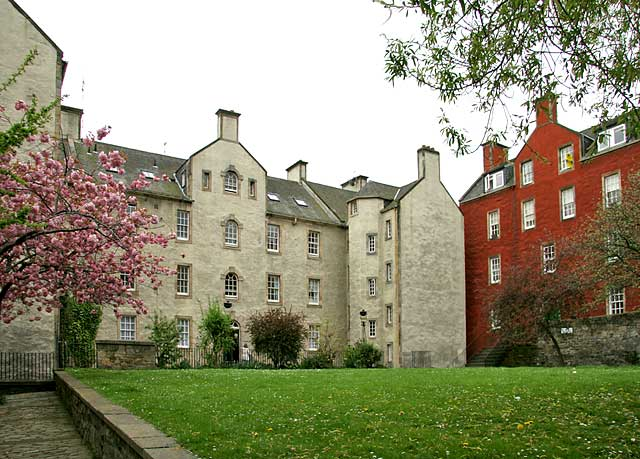
Chessel's Court, Edinburgh

Robert Philip Andrew Hurd (29 July 1905 – 17 September 1963) was an influential conservation architect. His original aim was to be an architectural author specialising in traditional forms. He came to Scotland in 1930 and worked at the Edinburgh College of Art for two years as assistant to the architect and planner Frank Mears. He was an early and highly respected conservation architect and wrote and broadcast on Scottish architecture, planning and reconstruction.

== Life ==
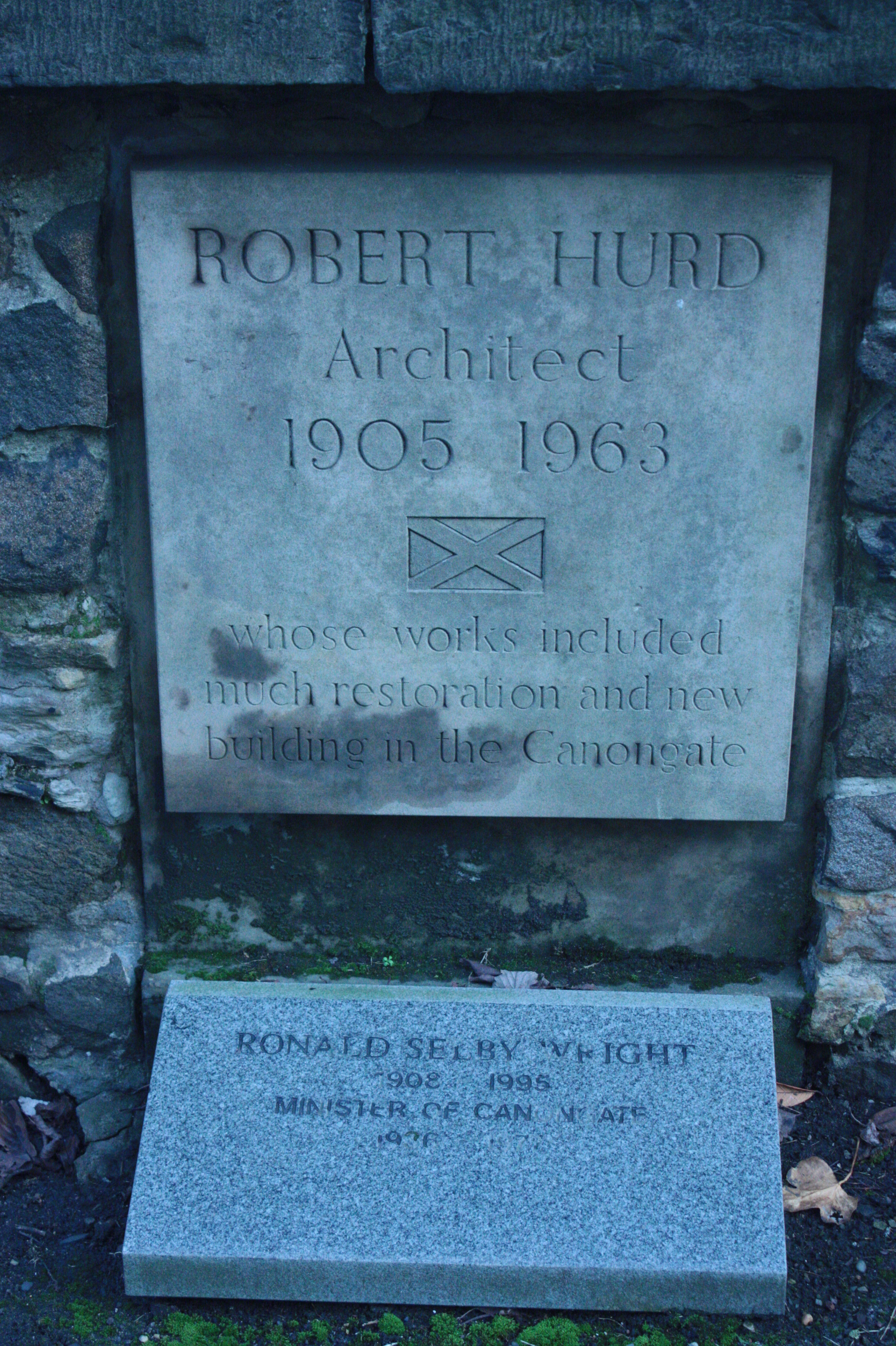
The grave of Robert Hurd, Canongate Kirkyard, Edinburgh

Hurd was of Anglo-Scottish parentage, the son of Sir Percy Angler Hurd MP and Hannah Swan Cox. He suffered from polio in early life and walked his whole life with a limp. He was educated at Marlborough College and then the LCC Central School of Arts. Thereafter he studied at Emmanuel College, Cambridge, becoming a close friend of Raymond McGrath and Mansfield Forbes. He had developed a love of Scotland during childhood holidays with his grandparents in Dundee and on student walking holidays in the Highlands. He came to live in Scotland in 1930 and completed his architectural studies at Edinburgh College of Art. As a student he lived in a house at 49 George Square. While working with Frank Mears, he met his mother's former tutor, the pioneering biologist and planner, Patrick Geddes, who was to be an abiding influence on his work.

He was an early member of the National Trust for Scotland and author of one of its first major publications, Scotland Under Trust (1938). In the same year he began campaigning to save historic buildings, his first coup being to temporarily rescue Tailors Hall on the Cowgate from demolition.

Although Hurd was declared unfit for overseas service, he served as an officer in the Royal Engineers (1940–46) and was put in charge of removing Edinburgh's cast-iron railings for the war effort. During this time he also became president of the Saltire Society, a role he continued until 1948. In 1946, he chaired a Saltire Society Committee which made recommendations on the future of Scottish broadcasting. He took an active interest in the arts in general and served on a number of Edinburgh International Festival committees. He also served on the Councils of the Edinburgh Architectural Association and the Edinburgh Film Guild. Politically, he was a Scottish nationalist.

== Work ==
In 1932 he went into partnership with Norman Neil (b. 1899), who was deeply influenced by German and Scandinavian architecture. Hurd himself quickly developed a love of conservation but also displayed a commitment to the modern in several projects.

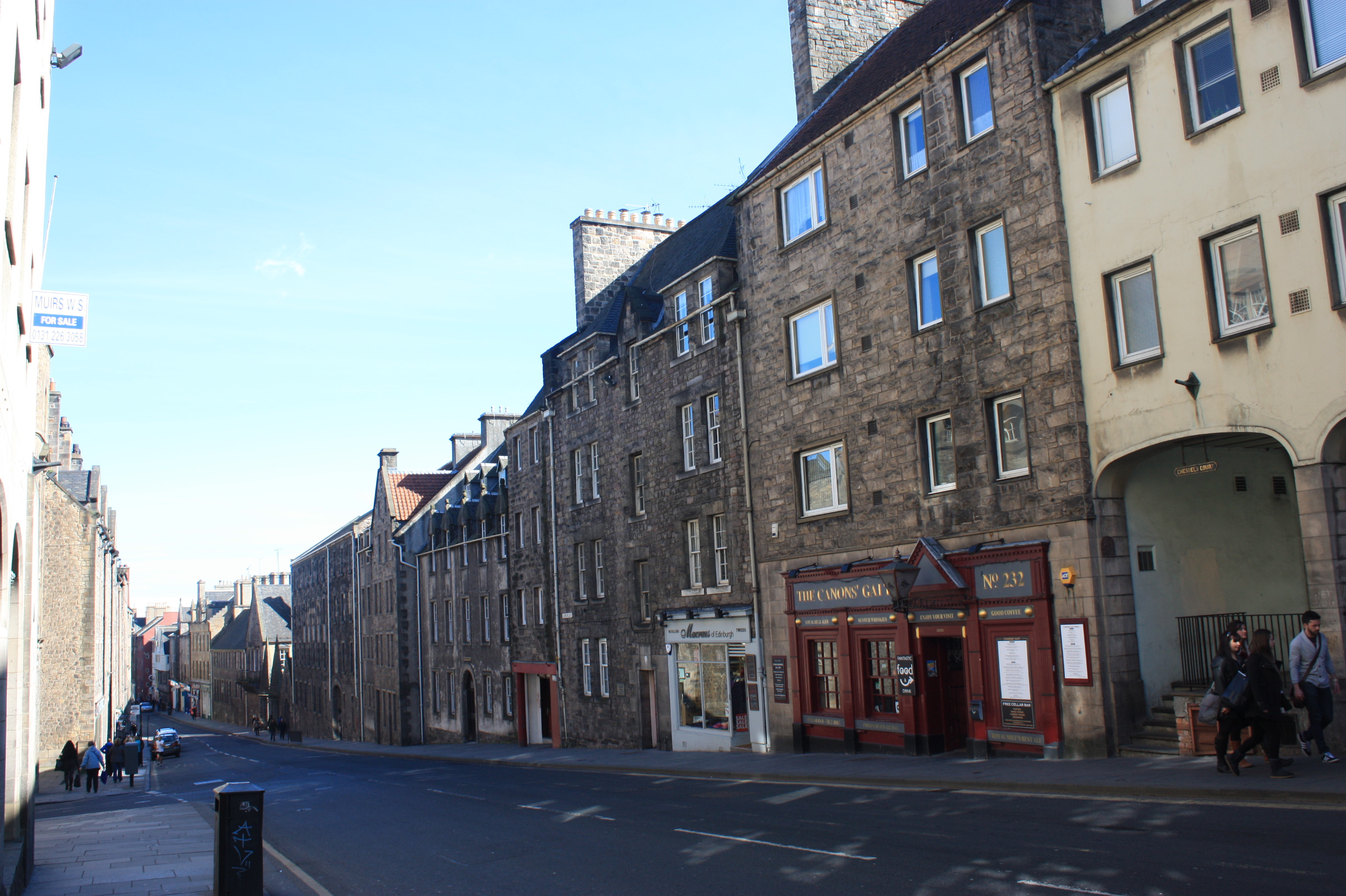
Robert Hurd's rebuilding of Canongate, Edinburgh

Early projects included the rebuilding of Eaglescarnie, near Haddington and the restoration of Acheson House in Edinburgh. He restored Lambs House in Leith and Hamilton House in East Lothian in 1937. His firm also undertook work in Old Aberdeen and in the West Highlands. During the Second World War, Hurd worked with fellow architect Alan Reiach on a book for the Saltire Society entitled Building Scotland – Past and Future, a pictorial appeal for post-war Scotland to be planned and designed bravely. In 1952 he received a major commission to replan and rebuild Edinburgh's Canongate, largely demolishing buildings and setting back the rebuilt facades to a new wider and straighter building line. Less care was taken over the rear elevations. The scale of the work required him to take on Ian Begg as a junior partner in 1953. He campaigned against the loss of George Square and in 1959 he was commissioned to restore the west side for University use. He was strongly interested in the arts and also helped found the Scottish Georgian Society, was an advisor to the BBC in Scotland, and helped to set up the Edinburgh Festival. His only noteworthy project of contemporary rather than historic idiom is a scheme of modernist flats at Ravelston Gardens, Edinburgh.

Hurd's passion for housing which took account of Scottish tradition and fitted the Scottish landscape led in 1937 to the foundation of the Saltire Society housing awards which continue today.

== Personal life ==
Also an outsider in other senses Hurd never joined the RIBA. Hurd was homosexual and had a single lifelong partner from around 1935. Hurd died whilst on holiday in Switzerland, but his body was flown home and his was the last full interment within the otherwise closed-to-burial Canongate Kirkyard.

A pencil sketch of Hurd by Antony Wolffe is in the collection of National Galleries of Scotland.

== Principal works ==
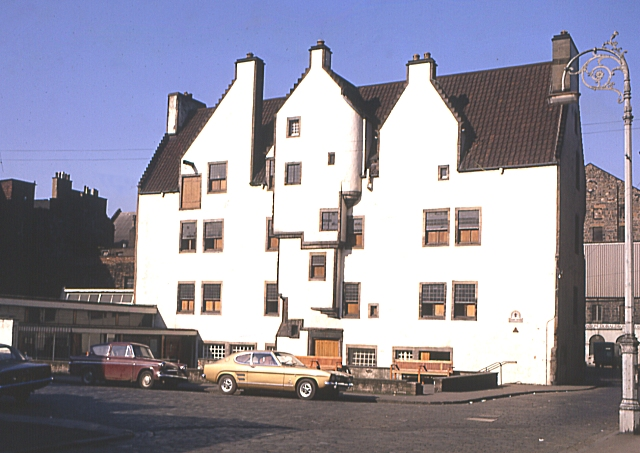
Lamb's House, Leith

- Ravelston Gardens (modernist flats), Edinburgh (1935)
- Restoration of Acheson House, Canongate, Edinburgh (1936)
- Restoration of Hamilton House, East Lothian (1937)
- Restoration of Lamb's House in Leith (1937)
- Restoration of Loudoun Hall near Ayr (1939)
- Restoration of Culzean Castle (1946–8)
- Restoration of tenements on Bank Street, Edinburgh (1950)
- Rebuilding of Chessel's Court and Morocco Land, Canongate Edinburgh (1952)
- Rebuilding of numerous tenements on Canongate Edinburgh (1952–5)
- Restoration of Culross Abbey House (1954)
- Restoration of Bible Land and Shoemaker Land, Canongate Edinburgh (1956)
- Library and Village Centre, Skelmorlie (1956)
- Extensions to his alma mater Emmanuel College, Cambridge (1957) (criticised by the Anti Ugly action group in 1959)
- Further restoration at Chessel's Court (1958)
- Kyle of Lachalsh Primary School (1959)
