= Tailor's Hall =

Coordinates: 55°56′54″N 3°11′24″W

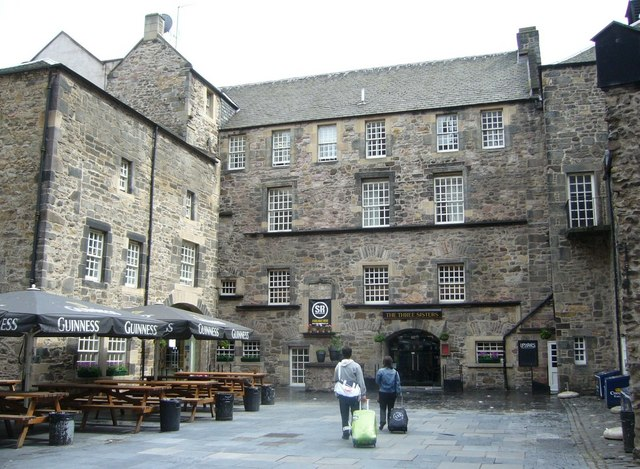
Tailors Hall

Tailor's Hall, is a historic building in the Cowgate area of Edinburgh's Old Town. It was built in 1621 by the Guild of Tailors. It is now in use as a Stay Central Hotel.

The main hall was built in 1621, on the south side of the courtyard. Then in 1640, a range of crow-stepped buildings was built on the north side fronting on to the Cowgate. This block, Tailor's Land, was demolished circa 1940 despite attempts by the architect Robert Hurd and others to save it.

In 1638 the protest of the National Covenant was drafted there by an assembly of between two and three hundred clergymen, and following the execution of Charles I in 1649, the hall was used as a courthouse of the Scottish Commissioners. The building was used as a playhouse between 1727 and 1753. When that closed, it became a storehouse of the Argyle Brewery. The building is category A listed.

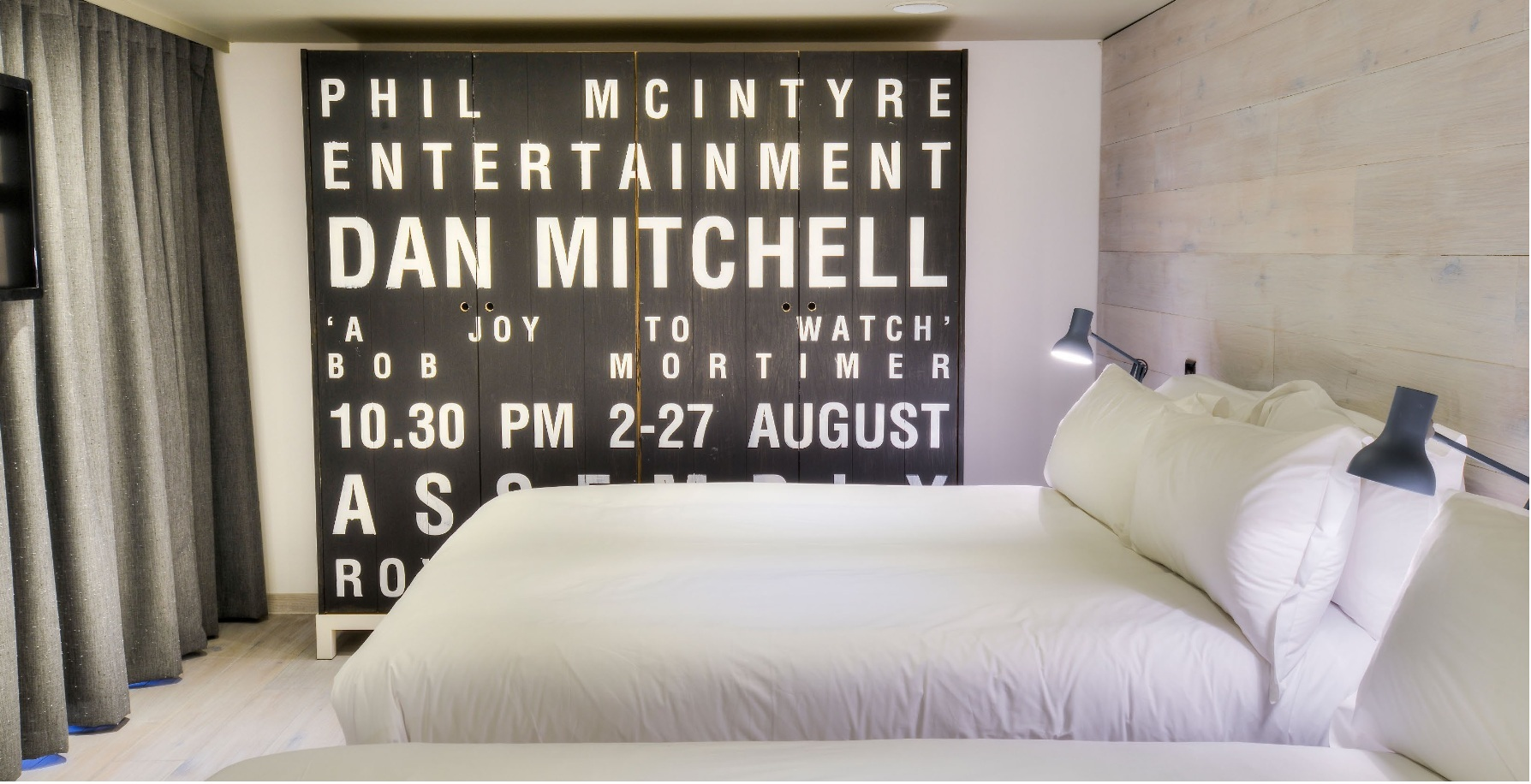
A room in the modern hotel

In 1998 the building was renovated and developed as the Tailors Hall Hotel, later the Central Hotel. In 2012 it was bought by the G1 Group a Scottish hospitality and leisure operator. After a refurbishment in 2014, Central Hotel was relaunched as STAY Central Hotel, a 3 star hotel with 37 bedrooms.
