= Emily Charlotte de Burgh, Countess of Cork =

Poet, writer

Lady Emily Charlotte de Burgh
- Countess of Cork
- The Lady Emily Dungarvan
- Born: Emily Charlotte de Burgh; 19 October 1828
- Died: 10 October 1912 (aged 83)
- Noble family: Burke
- Spouse: Richard Boyle, 9th Earl of Cork
- Issue: 7, including: Charles Boyle, 10th Earl of Cork; Robert Boyle, 11th Earl of Cork
- Father: Ulick de Burgh, 1st Marquess of Clanricarde
- Mother: Harriet Canning

Emily Charlotte de Burgh, Countess of Cork (English: /dəˈbɜːr/ də-BUR; Irish: de Búrca; 19 October 1828 – 10 October 1912) was a British poet, writer, and member of the Irish aristocracy.

== Biography ==
Cork was born on 19 October 1828 to Ulick de Burgh, 1st Marquess of Clanricarde and Harriet Canning, daughter of British Prime Minister George Canning. She was their second daughter. She married Richard Boyle, 9th Earl of Cork on 20 July 1853. She was known as The Lady Emily Dungarvan until she became Countess of Cork in 1856, upon her husband's ascension to the earldom. The couple had seven children. Cork wrote poetry, short stories and articles which was published in periodicals such as The Pall Mall Magazine and in 1903 she published Letters to and from Charles Boyle, 4th Earl of Orrery and John Boyle, Earl of Cork and Orrery. She died in London in 1912.

== Bibliography ==
=== Poems ===
- To Friends after Death, (1886)
- Les Laveuses de Nuit, (1900)
- Work On—Stand Fast, (1898)

=== Articles ===
- The Chronicle of a Street, (1895)
- Early Romances of the Century, (1896)
- Etiquette: Its Uses, Abuses, Changes, and Phases, (1901)
- "Our Neighbour", (1891)
- Society Again!, (1893)
- Three Types of Womanhood, (1889)
- Types of Character in the Book of Proverbs, (1892)
- A Woman's View, (1897)

=== Short stories, Books ===
- The True Legend of the Zephyr and the Rose, (1893)
- The Orrery Papers, Vols I and II, (1903)
