= Frank Jacques =

British political and educational activist

Frank Mortimer Jacques (16 October 1899 – 14 July 1988) was a British political and educational activist.

Jacques was born in Maidenhead, the son of Frank Henry Jacques, a railway station master. He attended Witney Grammar School and Oxford High School. He became a railway clerk, and joined the Railway Clerks' Association. He soon became secretary of its Maidenhead branch, but devoted much of his time to the Independent Labour Party, which was affiliated to the Labour Party. He stood for the Labour Party in Newbury at the 1924 and 1929 United Kingdom general elections, and then in Watford at the 1931 United Kingdom general election, but was not elected.

While Jacques was not able to obtain sponsorship for his candidatures from his union, he was the leading figure within the union arguing that it was not desirable for both the union's general secretary and president to contest parliamentary seats, as if both were elected, it would create problems in administering the union.

In 1936, Jacques became the Eastern District Secretary of the Workers' Educational Association, based in Cambridge. He remained in the post for more than fifty years, mentoring Raymond Williams, and also completed a degree in English.

He died in Cornwall in 1988.
