= 1918 Bath by-election =

UK Parliamentary by-election

The 1918 Bath by-election was held on 15 October 1918. The by-election was held due to the death in action of the incumbent Conservative MP, Lord Alexander Thynne. It was won by the Conservative candidate Charles Foxcroft who was unopposed.
