= Charles Foxcroft =

British politician (1868–1929)

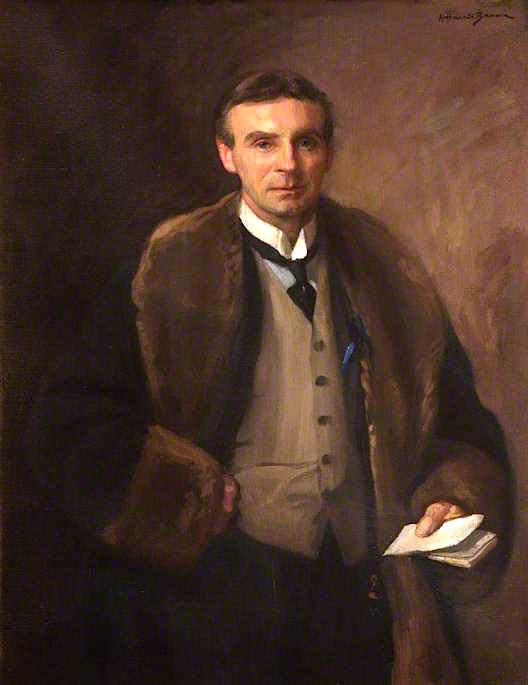
Portrait of Foxcroft, by Henry Harris Brown

Captain Charles Talbot Foxcroft (25 November 1868 – 11 February 1929) was a British Conservative Party politician. He was Member of Parliament (MP) for Bath from 1918 to 1923, and from 1924 until his death.

== Political career ==
Foxcroft first stood for election to Parliament at the 1906 general election, when he was an unsuccessful candidate in the Frome division of Somerset. Frome was a consistently Liberal seat, although the Liberal majorities were slim, and Foxcroft lost again in Frome at the elections in January 1910 and December 1910.

In September 1918, Lord Alexander Thynne, the Conservative MP for Bath, was killed in action in World War I. Foxcroft was selected as the Conservative candidate in the resulting by-election, and was elected unopposed on 15 October. Parliament was dissolved only five weeks later, on 21 November. Under the terms of the Representation of the People Act 1918 Bath was reduced from two seats in the House of Commons to one. However the parties in the Liberal-Conservative Coalition Government agreed an electoral pact, and no Liberal candidate stood in Bath in 1918. At the general election in December Foxcroft therefore only faced a Labour Party candidate, and won the election with 75% of votes cast. He was re-elected in a three-way contest in 1922, but at the 1923 general election he faced only one opponent, the Liberal barrister Frank Raffety. Raffety took the seat, but parliament was dissolved less than a year later. At the general election in October 1924, Foxcroft retook the seat with 56% of the votes in a 3-way contest.

Following his election in 1924 Foxcroft served as Parliamentary Private Secretary to the Assistant Postmaster General, a position he held until his death. He died in office in February 1929, aged 60.

== Family ==
Foxcroft was the son of Edward Talbot Day Foxcroft (c.1837–1911), born Edward Talbot Day Jones, the owner of Hinton House at Hinton Charterhouse in Somerset and his wife Wilhelmina Colquhoun née Robertson-Glasgow. He inherited the estate on the death of his father.

== Works ==
- Foxcroft, Charles T. (1918). The Night Sister, and Other Poems. London: Methuen & Co.

Parliament of the United Kingdom
| Preceded by Lord Alexander Thynne; Sir Charles Hunter, Bt | Member of Parliament for Bath; October 1918 – 1923; With: Sir Charles Hunter, Bt to December 1918 | Succeeded by Frank Raffety |
| Preceded by Frank Raffety | Member of Parliament for Bath; 1924–1929 | Succeeded by Hon. Charles Baillie-Hamilton |
