= Frederick Gould =

British politician (1879–1971)

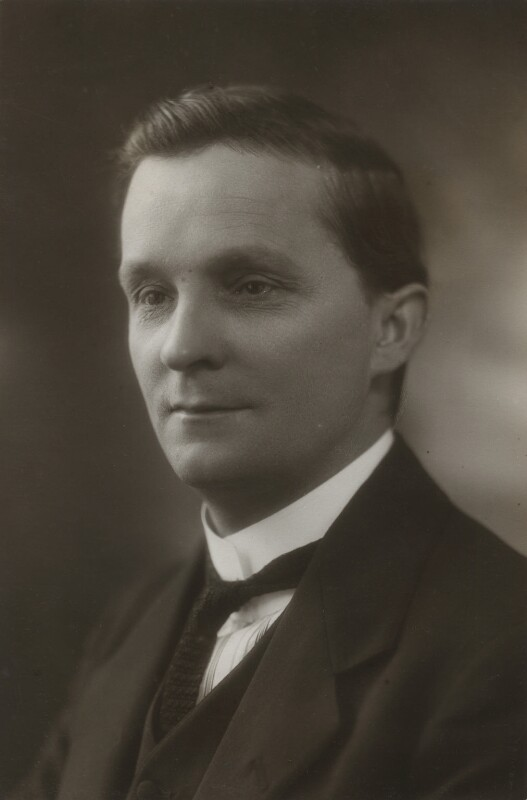
Gould in 1924

Frederick Gould OBE (28 June 1879 – 23 February 1971) was an English trade unionist and Labour Party politician who was a member of parliament (MP) for Frome from 1923 to 1924 and from 1929 to 1931. He was also the father of Sir Ronald Gould, teacher and trade unionist.

== Early life ==
Gould was born in Midsomer Norton, Somerset. He came from a mining family with a strong Methodist background. His father had been one of the founders of the Somerset Miners' Association. Frederick attended his local Church of England school. He left school at 12 and began work as a stable boy. A few years later he took a job as a 'rounder' at Ollie Edwards's Boot Factory in Midsomer Norton.

He married Emma Gay (born 1880, Radstock), at 24, and his first child Ronald was born ten months later. Emma was descended from the playwright John Gay. She had been a servant to the Monckton family at Clevedon, her duties including looking after their children including the young Sir Walter Monckton.

== Political career ==
He became local secretary of the National Union of Boot and Shoe Operatives. In 1908 he became an unpaid organiser for the Independent Labour Party and started several branches. In 1910 he won a seat on Radstock Urban District Council.

He successfully stood as Labour MP at the General Election on 6 December 1923. He lost the seat in the election of 1924, but regained it in 1929. He became a parliamentary private secretary in 1930, but lost the seat in Labour's electoral defeat in 1931. At that point his union decided that it wanted him to fight a seat with a larger proportion of footwear workers, but he was defeated at the 1935 election in Leicester East. He received the OBE in 1945.

== Later life ==
He died on 23 February 1971. His wife Emma died on 1 September 1972, aged 91.

Parliament of the United Kingdom
Preceded by Percy Hurd	Member of Parliament for Frome; 1923–1924	Succeeded by Geoffrey Peto
Preceded by Geoffrey Peto	Member of Parliament for Frome; 1929–1931	Succeeded by Viscount Henry Weymouth
