= Charles Boyle, 10th Earl of Cork =

Irish soldier and peer

The Right Honourable The Earl of Cork
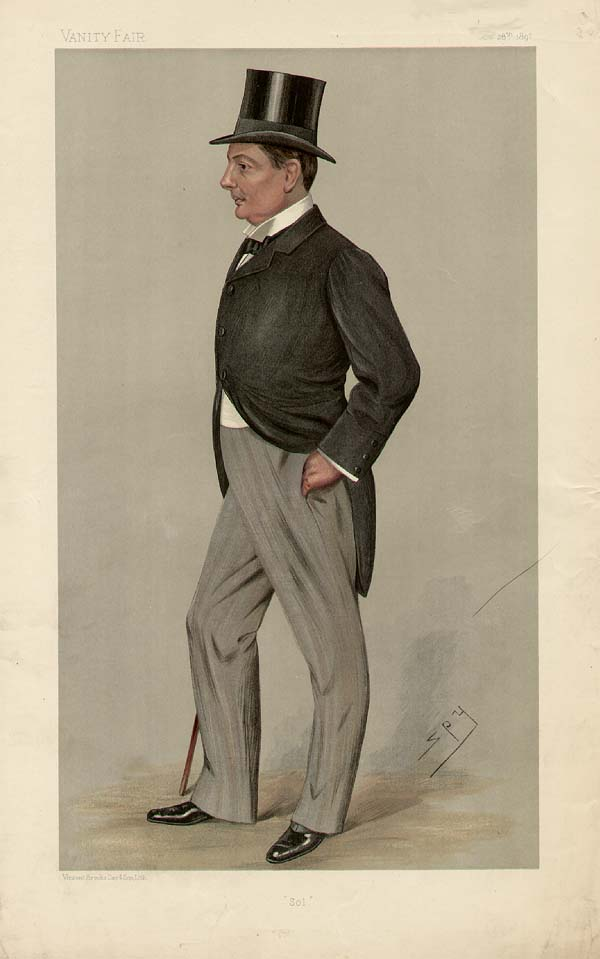
- "Sol" Viscount Dungarvan as caricatured by Spy (Leslie Ward) in Vanity Fair, October 1897

Deputy lieutenant of Somerset
- In office 26 September 1885 – 25 March 1925
- Appointed by: Richard Boyle, 9th Earl of Cork

Grand Master of Masons of Somerset
- In office 1891–1925

Personal details
- Born: Charles Spencer Canning Boyle; 24 September 1861 Grafton Street, London, England
- Died: 25 March 1925 (aged 63) London, England
- Spouse: Rosalie Gray (m. 1918)
- Relations: Robert Boyle, 11th Earl of Cork (brother)
- Parents: Lady Emily de Burgh (mother); Richard Boyle, 9th Earl of Cork (father)

Military service
- Allegiance: United Kingdom
- Branch/service: British Army
- Years of service: 1881–1903
- Rank: Lieutenant Colonel (during service); Colonel (honorary)
- Unit: North Somerset Yeomanry (1881–1900); 22nd Battalion, Imperial Yeomanry (1901–1902); North Somerset Imperial Yeomanry (1902–1903)
- Battles/wars: Second Boer War

Charles Spencer Canning Boyle, 10th Earl of Cork and 10th Earl of Orrery (24 November 1861 – 25 March 1925), styled Viscount Dungarvan until 1904, was an Irish soldier and peer.

== Biography ==
Born to Lady Emily de Burgh and Richard Boyle, 9th Earl of Cork, on the 24 September 1861 on Grafton Street in London, England. Lord Dungarvan was appointed a deputy lieutenant of Somerset on 26 September 1885, and Grand Master of the Freemasons of Somerset from 1891.

He was commissioned as a Lieutenant into the North Somerset Yeomanry, a part-time regiment commanded by his father, on 1 July 1881. On 5 June 1886, he was promoted to captain, and on 27 May 1893 he succeeded his father as lieutenant-colonel commandant of the regiment. The Second Boer War broke out in South Africa in October 1899, and following early defeats, the British government enlisted militia and yeomanry officers to increase their fighting force. Lord Dungarvan left Southampton in February 1900, and arrived in Cape Town the following month. He was seconded as a major in the Imperial Yeomanry on 3 April 1901, serving as second in command of the 22nd Battalion. He resigned his commission on 15 January 1902, when he was granted the honorary rank of Major in the Army. Later the same month he returned to the United Kingdom on board the SS Saxon, and became Lieutenant-colonel on the Establishment of the North Somerset Imperial Yeomanry. On 8 August 1903, he was granted the honorary rank of colonel. Dungarvan resigned his Yeomanry commission on 7 November 1903, retaining his rank.

He succeeded to the Earldom upon the death of his father, Richard Boyle, 9th Earl of Cork on 22 June 1904.

Lord Cork married, 21 November 1918, Mrs Rosalie Gray (d. 15 March 1930), daughter of William Waterman de Villiers, of Romsey, Hampshire, but had no issue.

He was a member of the Bath and County Club.

Lord Cork died on 25 March 1925 in London. The earldom passed to his brother, the 11th Earl.

Peerage of Ireland
Preceded by Richard Boyle	Earl of Cork; Earl of Orrery; 1904–1925	Succeeded by Robert Boyle
