= George Peabody Gooch =

British journalist & politician (1873–1968)

George Gooch

George Peabody Gooch OM CH FBA (21 October 1873 – 31 August 1968) was a British journalist, historian and Liberal Party politician. A follower of Lord Acton who was independently wealthy, he never held an academic position, but knew the work of historians of continental Europe.

== Personal life ==
Gooch was born in Kensington, London, the son of Charles Cubitt Gooch, a merchant banker and business associate of prominent merchant banker and philanthropist George Peabody for whom he was named, and Mary Jane Gooch, née Blake. His eldest brother was Henry Cubitt Gooch, a future Conservative MP. He was educated at Eton College, King's College London and Trinity College, Cambridge, where he gained a First in History. He won the Thirlwall Prize in 1897, but failed to gain a fellowship at Trinity despite the support of Lord Acton.

== Member of Parliament ==
He was elected at the general election of 1906 as Liberal Member of Parliament for Bath, but lost the seat at the general election of January 1910. Whilst an MP he voted in favour of the 1908 Women's Enfranchisement Bill. He stood again in Bath at the general election in December 1910, but did not regain the seat, and was unsuccessful again when he stood at a by-election in Reading in November 1913.

Gooch succeeded Sir Richard Stapley in 1919 as Chairman of the Sir Richard Stapley Educational Trust. During the 1930s, in seeing that war was approaching, he encouraged the Trust to put aside a small fund to assist the educational needs of Second World War refugees.

He was President of the Historical Association (1922–1925) and of the National Peace Council (1933–1936). In June 1936 he was elected to serve on the Liberal Party Council.

Gooch edited the Contemporary Review from 1911 until 1960.

== Historian ==
After the First World War, Gooch became an influential historian of Europe of the period and was critical of British policy. He was active in the Union of Democratic Control.

For about ten years from the mid-1920s onwards, he was involved, with Harold Temperley, in the publication of the official British diplomatic history. The selection of Gooch for the project selection was made over the reservations of James Wycliffe Headlam-Morley and of Temperley himself, who believed that Gooch was too committed to a pro-German position and too critical of Sir Edward Grey.

Gooch has been noted as a significant revisionist historian of the Europe of the early 20th century, in particular in relation to the causes of the First World War. He has been described as one of the "early revisionists", alongside Harry Elmer Barnes and Sidney Bradshaw Fay.

== Awards and honours ==
Gooch received many honours. became a member of the Order of the Companions of Honour in 1939, and a member of the Order of Merit in 1963. He was appointed to the Pour le Mérite in 1954. He was elected Fellow of the British Academy in 1926 and honorary fellow of Trinity College, Cambridge in 1935.

== Works ==
- The Second Empire (1st ed. 1960)
- English Democratic Ideas in the Seventeenth Century (with Harold Joseph Laski (1st ed. 1898, 2nd ed. 1927, 3rd ed. 1959)
- History of Our Time, 1885–1911 (1911)
- History and Historians in the Nineteenth Century (1913) Second rev. ed. (1952). New ed. with new historical survey and Preface. (1959)
- The Races of Austria–Hungary (1917)
- Germany and the French Revolution (1920)
- Life of Lord Courtney (1920)
- A History of Modern Europe, 1878–1919 (1923); 2nd ed. 1946
- Franco-German Relations 1871–1914: The Creighton Lecture for 1923 (1923)
- Germany (1925)
- British Documents on the Origins of the War, 1898–1914, with Harold Temperley (11 vols.) (1926–1938)
- Recent Revelations of European Diplomacy (1927; 3rd ed. 1940)
- Courts and Cabinets. (New York, 1946)
- Frederick the Great: The Ruler, the Writer, the Man. (New York, 1947) (German edition Göttingen 1951)
- Studies in German History. (London 1948)
- Maria Theresa: And Other Studies (1951)
- Under Six Reigns (autobiography) (1958)
- Catherine the Great: And Other Studies (1966)

== Notes ==
Parliament of the United Kingdom
Preceded by Edmond Wodehouse; Wyndham Murray	Member of Parliament for Bath; 1906 – January 1910; With: Donald Maclean	Succeeded by Sir Charles Hunter; Lord Alexander Thynne
