= Sir Charles Hunter, 3rd Baronet =

British Army officer and politician (1858–1924)

Sir Charles Roderick Hunter, 3rd Baronet (6 July 1858 – 24 June 1924) was a British army officer and Conservative Party politician.

The second son of Sir Claudius Stephen Paul Hunter, 2nd Baronet and his wife Constance née Bosanquet, he was educated at Eton College and the Royal Military College, Sandhurst. He was commissioned as a second lieutenant in the 64th (2nd Staffordshire) Regiment of Foot in January 1878. In May of the same year he transferred to the Rifle Brigade, and in 1880 he was promoted to full lieutenant. In 1884 he was appointed aide de camp to Lord Alexander Russell, commander in chief of troops in Canada, and seconded to the general staff. He returned to his regiment in September 1885, promoted to captain.

In 1887 he married Agnes Lillie Kennard of Crawley, Hampshire.

In 1890 he succeeded his father in the baronetcy (his older brother having died), retiring to the reserve of officers, and accepting a commission as major in the 1st London (City of London Rifle Volunteer Brigade) Volunteer Rifle Corps, a unit of the part-time Volunteer Force.

After the outbreak of the Second Boer War, Hunter was seconded for service with the Imperial Yeomanry. He left Southampton on board the SS Scot in January 1900, arriving in South Africa the following month.

In January 1910 he was elected as one of two members of parliament (MPs) for Bath alongside Lord Alexander Thynne. The two members were re-elected at the December 1910 election. During the First World War returned to the general staff, holding the temporary rank of major from 1914 – 1916. In September 1918 Thynne died and Charles Foxcroft was elected in his place. In December 1918 Bath was reduced to a single-member constituency, and Hunter stood down in favour of Foxcroft.

Hunter died at his London home from complications after undergoing an operation in June 1924. He was buried in Stratfield Mortimer, site of the family seat, Mortimer Hill. He had no children, and the baronetcy became extinct on his death.

Parliament of the United Kingdom
Preceded by Donald Maclean; George Peabody Gooch	Member of Parliament for Bath; 1910–1918; With: Lord Alexander Thynne (until September 1918); Charles Foxcroft (from October 1918)	Succeeded by Charles Foxcroft
Baronetage of the United Kingdom
Preceded by Claudius Hunter	Baronet (of London); 1890–1924	Extinct
