= Sir William Mount, 1st Baronet =

British politician

Sir William Arthur Mount, 1st Baronet CBE DL (Hartley, Hampshire, 3 August 1866 – 8 December 1930) was a British Conservative Party politician and Member of Parliament for the Newbury constituency. He is the great-grandfather of Conservative politician David Cameron, who was Prime Minister of the United Kingdom from 2010 to 2016.

== Early life ==
The eldest son of William George Mount of Wasing Place, Berkshire and wife Marianne Emily Clutterbuck, he was educated at Eton College and New College, Oxford where he achieved honours in classics and modern history.

== Career ==
=== Law and politics ===
He was called to the Bar by the Inner Temple in 1893. Between 1896 and 1903 he served as assistant private secretary to two Chancellors of Exchequer, Sir Michael Hicks Beach (later Viscount St. Aldwyn) and (from October 1902) Charles Thomson Ritchie (later Lord Ritchie of Dundee).

After his father stepped down as member for the South, or Newbury division of Berkshire in 1900 he was elected and served for six years before being defeated at the 1906 general election by his Liberal opponent. In the January 1910 general election he stood again and succeeded in regaining his seat where he remained until resigning in 1922.

=== Berkshire appointments ===
He was a deputy lieutenant and magistrate for Berkshire and was elected chairman of the Berkshire county council in 1926.

== Baronetcy ==
He was created a baronet in the 1921 Birthday Honours.

== Marriage and family ==
Mount married Hilda Lucy Adelaide Low on 9 November 1899 in Kensington, London, Middlesex. Hilda was born 23 May 1875 to William Malcolm Low and wife (m. 30 July 1872), Lady Ida Matilda Alice Feilding. (Note: William Malcolm Low was from India. He was born 6 November 1835 and died 14 June 1923. Lady Ida Matilda Alice Feilding was born 23 June 1840 and died 16 December 1915, paternal granddaughter of General Sir John Low (Clatto, Fife, 13 December 1788 – 10 January 1880) and wife (m. Mussoorie, India, 10 April 1829) Augusta Ludlow Shakespear (Calcutta, India, 4 March 1809 – 16 August 1892), and maternal granddaughter of William Basil Percy Feilding, 7th Earl of Denbigh, 6th Earl of Desmond and wife Lady Mary Elizabeth Kitty Moreton (daughter of Thomas Reynolds-Moreton, 1st Earl of Ducie and wife Lady Frances Herbert).) She died 3 April 1950.

Mount and his wife were parents to Sir William Mount, 2nd Baronet, Robert Francis ("Robin") Mount, and George Richard Mount.

== Death ==
He died while crossing a meadow at Aldermaston while riding with the South Berkshire hounds from his residence at Wasing Place on 8 December 1930.

== Arms ==
Coat of arms of Sir William Mount, 1st Baronet
Crest Upon a mount vert a fox salient proper, supporting a ragged staff erect sable Escutcheon Or on a mount vert a lion rampant azure, ducally crowned or, between in chief two roses gules, barbed and seeded proper Motto Prudenter et Constanter ("Prudently and Constantly")

== Notes ==
Parliament of the United Kingdom
Preceded by William George Mount	Member of Parliament for Newbury; 1900 – 1906	Succeeded by Frederick Coleridge Mackarness
Preceded by Frederick Coleridge Mackarness	Member of Parliament for Newbury; January 1910 – 1922	Succeeded by Howard Clifton Brown
Church of England titles
Preceded by Sir Charles Nicholson	Second Church Estates Commissioner; 1918–1922	Succeeded by John Birchall
Baronetage of the United Kingdom
New creation	Baronet (of Wasing); 1921–1930	Succeeded by William Mount
