= Robert Edward Boyle =

Robert Edward Boyle (March 1809 – 3 September 1854) was a British soldier and Liberal Party politician.

Boyle was the fourth son of Edmund Boyle, 8th Earl of Cork, and his wife Isabella Henrietta (née Poyntz). He served with the Coldstream Guards and achieved the rank of colonel.

At the 1847 general election he was elected unopposed as the Member of Parliament (MP) for Frome. Boyle was returned unopposed in 1852, but that election was later voided after an electoral petition, because Boyle's position as Secretary of the Most Illustrious Order of St Patrick election was held to be an office of profit under the crown. He was re-elected unopposed at the resulting by-election in March 1853, and held his seat in the House of Commons until his death the following year, aged 45. Serving in the Crimean War, Boyle died of fever in Varna, and was buried at sea.

He married Georgiana, daughter of Abraham Wildey Robarts, in 1844. They had one son and two daughters. Boyle died in September 1854, aged 45, and was succeeded as Member of Parliament for Frome by his nephew Viscount Dungarvan. His wife survived him by almost 60 years and died in 1911.

Parliament of the United Kingdom
| Preceded by Thomas Sheppard | Member of Parliament for Frome; 1847 – 1854 | Succeeded by Viscount Dungarvan |
