= Sir John Barlow, 1st Baronet =

British politician

Sir John Barlow Bt

Member of Parliament for Frome
- In office 1896–1918
- Preceded by: Viscount Weymouth
- Succeeded by: Percy Hurd
- In office 1892–1895
- Preceded by: Viscount Weymouth
- Succeeded by: Viscount Weymouth

Personal details
- Born: 16 April 1857
- Died: 17 September 1932 (aged 75)
- Party: Liberal Party
- Spouse: Anna, Lady Barlow
- Parent(s): Thomas Barlow; Mary Ann Emmott

Coat of arms of Sir John Barlow, 1st Baronet
Crest A lion sejant affrontée Or holding erect in the forepaws a cross crosslet fitchée Gules. Escutcheon Per pale Ermine and Gules three chevrons counterchanged over all two lions combatant Or. Motto Qui Non Proficit Deficit

Sir John Emmott Barlow, 1st Baronet (16 April 1857 – 17 September 1932) was a British businessman and Liberal Party politician.

Barlow was the son of Thomas Barlow and his wife Mary Ann (née Emmott). He was educated at Windlesham House School, Grove House School, Tottenham and the University of London. He was a senior partner in the family firms of Thomas Barlow & Brothers, of Manchester and London, and Barlow and Company, of Calcutta, Shanghai, Singapore and Kuala Lumpur which traded in tea, coffee, rubber and such. He sat in the House of Commons as Member of Parliament (MP) for Frome in Somerset from 1892 to 1895 and from 1896 to 1918, and was a justice of the peace for Cheshire and Somerset and a County Alderman for Cheshire. In 1907 he was created a baronet, of Bradwall Hall in Sandbach in the County of Chester.

Barlow married the Hon. Anna Maria, daughter of Richard Denman and Helen Mary McMicking, on 13 July 1895. They had two sons and two daughters. He died in September 1932, aged 75, and was succeeded in the baronetcy by his eldest son John, who was a Conservative MP. Lady Barlow died in 1965.

== Notes ==
Parliament of the United Kingdom
Preceded by Viscount Weymouth	Member of Parliament for Frome; 1892 – 1895	Succeeded by Viscount Weymouth
Preceded by Viscount Weymouth	Member of Parliament for Frome; 1896 – 1918	Succeeded by Percy Hurd
Baronetage of the United Kingdom
New creation	Baronet (of Bradwall Hall); 1907–1932	Succeeded by John Denman Barlow
