= Richard Boyle, 9th Earl of Cork =

British courtier and politician

The Right Honourable The Earl of Cork KP PC
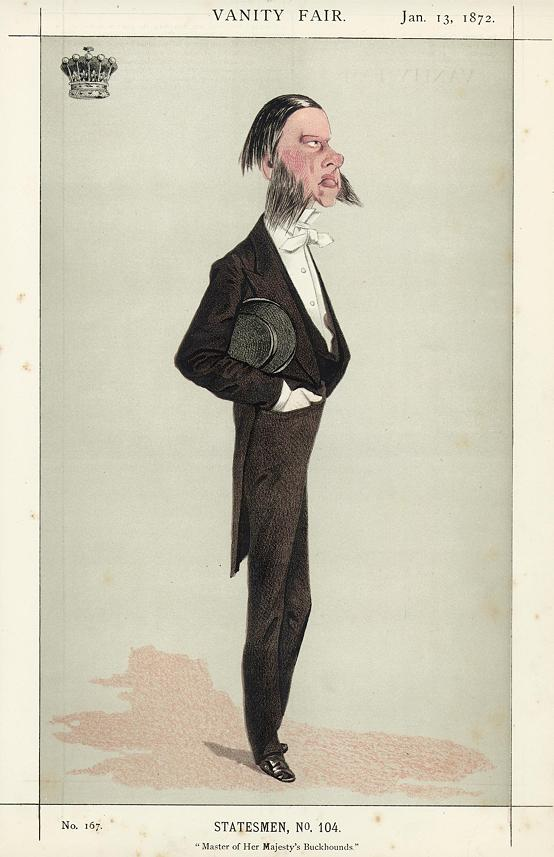
- Caricature, January 1872

Master of the Horse
- In office 10 February 1886 – 20 July 1886
- Monarch: Victoria
- Prime Minister: William Ewart Gladstone
- Preceded by: The Earl of Bradford
- Succeeded by: The Duke of Portland
- In office 19 March 1894 – 21 June 1895
- Monarch: Victoria
- Prime Minister: The Earl of Rosebery
- Preceded by: The Viscount Oxenbridge
- Succeeded by: The Duke of Portland

Personal details
- Born: 19 April 1829 Dublin, Ireland
- Died: 22 June 1904 (aged 75) Berkeley Square, Mayfair, London
- Party: Liberal
- Spouse: Lady Emily de Burgh (1828–1912)
- Children: 7, including: Charles Boyle, 10th Earl of Cork; Robert Boyle, 11th Earl of Cork
- Relatives: Edmund Boyle, 8th Earl of Cork (grandfather)
- Education: Christ Church, Oxford

Richard Edmund St Lawrence Boyle, 9th Earl of Cork and 9th Earl of Orrery KP, PC (19 April 1829 – 22 June 1904), styled Viscount Dungarvan between 1834 and 1856, was a British courtier and Liberal politician. In a ministerial career spanning between 1866 and 1895, he served three times as Master of the Buckhounds and twice as Master of the Horse.

== Background and education ==
Boyle was born in Dublin, Ireland, the eldest son of Charles Boyle, Viscount Dungarvan, by his wife Lady Catherine St Lawrence, daughter of William St Lawrence, 2nd Earl of Howth. He was the grandson of Edmund Boyle, 8th Earl of Cork. He was educated at Eton and Christ Church, Oxford. He became known by the courtesy title Viscount Dungarvan on the early death of his father in 1834. He was a member of Brooks's and White's clubs. On 20 July 1850, he was commissioned a captain in the North Somerset Yeomanry.

== Political career ==
Lord Dungarvan was elected Member of Parliament for Frome at a by-election in 1854, a seat he held until 1856, when he succeeded his grandfather in the earldom and entered the House of Lords. In 1860 he was made a Knight of the Order of St Patrick. He became a government member in January 1866, when he was appointed Master of the Buckhounds under Lord Russell, a post he held until the administration fell in July 1866. He was sworn of the Privy Council in May of that year. He was once again Master of the Buckhounds under William Ewart Gladstone between 1868 and 1874 and between 1880 and 1885. In 1882 he was appointed one of the speakers of the House of Lords. When Gladstone became prime minister for the third time in February 1886, Cork was appointed Master of the Horse. However, the government fell in July of the same year. He did not serve in Gladstone's fourth administration of 1892 to 1894, but when Lord Rosebery succeeded as prime minister in March 1894, Cork was once again appointed Master of the Horse. The Liberal government fell in June the following year.

Lord Cork was also Lord Lieutenant of Somerset from 1864 to 1904, an Aide-de-Camp to Queen Victoria from 1889 to 1899 and a Colonel of the North Somerset Yeomanry.

== Estates ==
According to John Bateman, who derived his information from statistics published in 1873, Lord Cork, of Marston House, Frome, had 3,398 acres in Somerset (worth 5,094 guineas per annum), 20,195 acres in County Cork (worth 6,943 guineas per annum), 11,531 acres in County Kerry (worth 2,447 guineas per annum), and 3,189 acres in County Limerick (worth 2,859 guineas per annum).

He donated the land for the Boyle Cross in the market place of the Somerset town of Frome.

== Family ==
Lord Cork married Lady Emily Charlotte de Burgh (19 October 1828 – 10 October 1912), second daughter of Ulick de Burgh, 1st Marquess of Clanricarde, on 20 July 1853. They had nine children:

- Lady Emily Harriet Catherine Boyle (19 September 1854 – 28 July 1931), married Capt. James Dalison Alexander, and had issue, including Sir Ulick Alexander
- Lady Grace Elizabeth Boyle (20 January 1856 – 23 May 1935), married the Hon. Henry Francis Baring, son of the 1st Baron Northbrook and had issue.
- Lady Honora Janet Boyle (10 April 1857 – 11 March 1953), married Robert Kirkman Hodgson DL, with issue.
- Lady Dorothy Blanche Boyle (18 November 1858 – 7 June 1938), married Walter Long, 1st Viscount Long, and had issue.
- Lady Isabel Lettice Theodosia Boyle (10 April 1860 – 6 April 1904), married James Walker Larnach, and had issue.
- Charles Spencer Boyle, 10th Earl of Cork (1861–1925), married Mrs Rosalie Gray, née de Villiers, and had no issue.
- Lady Bertha Louise Canning (24 November 1861 – 2 February 1862), twin sister of Charles; died in infancy
- Robert John Lascelles Boyle, 11th Earl of Cork (1864–1934), married Josephine Hale, of San Francisco, and had no issue.
- Hon. FitzAdelm Alfred Wentworth Boyle (20 August 1866 – 6 January 1890), died unmarried

Lord and Lady Cork celebrated their golden wedding anniversary in 1903. He died at Berkeley Square, Mayfair, London, in June 1904, aged 75, and was succeeded in the earldom by his eldest son, Charles. The Countess of Cork died in October 1912, 10 days shy of her 84th birthday.

Parliament of the United Kingdom
Preceded by Robert Edward Boyle	Member of Parliament for Frome; 1854–1856	Succeeded by William George Boyle
Political offices
Preceded by The Earl of Bessborough	Master of the Buckhounds; January–July 1866	Succeeded by The Lord Colville of Culross
Preceded by The Lord Colville of Culross	Master of the Buckhounds; 1868–1874	Succeeded by The Earl of Hardwicke
Preceded by The Earl of Hardwicke	Master of the Buckhounds; 1880–1885	Succeeded by The Marquess of Waterford
Preceded by The Earl of Bradford	Master of the Horse; February–July 1886	Succeeded by The Duke of Portland
Preceded by The Viscount Oxenbridge	Master of the Horse; 1894–1895	Succeeded by The Duke of Portland
Honorary titles
Preceded by The Viscount Portman	Lord Lieutenant of Somerset; 1864–1904	Succeeded by The Marquess of Bath
Peerage of Ireland
Preceded by Edmund Boyle	Earl of Cork; Earl of Orrery; 1856–1904	Succeeded by Charles Boyle
