= Lord Alexander Thynne =

British Army officer and politician (1873–1918)

Lord Alexander Thynne DSO
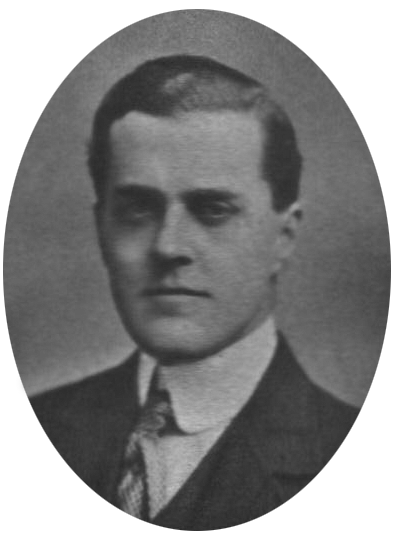
- Alexander Thynne from the Roll of Honour published in The Illustrated London News on 28 September 1918.

Member of Parliament for Bath
- In office January 1910 - 1918

Personal details
- Born: 17 February 1873 London, England
- Died: 14 September 1918 (aged 45) France
- Party: Conservative
- Parent: John Thynne (father)
- Relatives: Thomas Thynne (brother)
- Military career
- Branch: British Army
- Rank: Lieutenant-Colonel
- Unit: Imperial Yeomanry
- Commands: Royal Wiltshire Yeomanry; Wiltshire Regiment
- Conflicts: Second Boer War; Dervish War; World War I; Battle of the Somme
- Awards: Distinguished Service Order; Croix de Guerre

Lord Alexander George Boteville Thynne DSO (17 February 1873 – 14 September 1918) was a British Army officer and Conservative politician.

== Biography ==
Thynne, born in London, was the third and youngest son of John Thynne, 4th Marquess of Bath, and his wife Frances Isabella Catherine (née Vesey). He was commissioned a second lieutenant in the Royal Wiltshire Yeomanry in April 1897. Following the outbreak of the Second Boer War in late 1899, Thynne volunteered for active service and was commissioned a lieutenant in the Imperial Yeomanry on 7 February 1900, leaving Liverpool on the SS Cymric in March 1900 to serve in South Africa with the 1st (Wiltshire) company of the 1st Battalion. During the war, he was promoted a lieutenant in the Royal Wiltshire Yeomanry on 13 June 1900, while still in South Africa. He resigned his active commission with the Imperial Yeomanry on 28 July 1902, and in January 1903 was back in the Royal Wiltshire Yeomanry. He was later a temporary lieutenant-colonel in the Service Battalion of the Wiltshire Regiment and served in the Somaliland campaign of 1903 to 1904.

In the January 1910 general election he was elected to the House of Commons as one of two representatives for Bath. He had stood unsuccessfully in the 1896 Frome by-election when his brother was elevated to the House of Lords as the 5th Marquess of Bath. He also served as a member of London County Council.

During the First World War Thynne was twice wounded in the Battle of the Somme in 1916 and awarded the Distinguished Service Order and the Croix de Guerre. He was killed in action in France on 14 September 1918, aged 45, whilst commanding 6th (Royal Wiltshire Yeomanry) Battalion, Wiltshire Regiment and was buried at Béthune Town Cemetery. He is commemorated on Panel 8 of the Parliamentary War Memorial in Westminster Hall, one of 22 MPs that died during the First World War to be named on that memorial. Thynne is one of 19 MPs who fell in the war who are commemorated by heraldic shields in the Commons Chamber. A further act of commemoration came with the unveiling in 1932 of a manuscript-style illuminated book of remembrance for the House of Commons, which includes a short biographical account of the life and death of Thynne. Thynne is also commemorated on the Norton War Memorial and the Great War roll of honour at All Saints' Church, Norton, Northamptonshire.

Thynne never married. He is reported to have been a lover of sculptor Clare Sheridan, a cousin of Winston Churchill.

== Notes ==
Parliament of the United Kingdom
Preceded by Donald Maclean; George Peabody Gooch	Member of Parliament for Bath; January 1910 – 1918; With: Sir Charles Hunter	Succeeded by Sir Charles Hunter; Charles Foxcroft
