= 1876 Frome by-election =

UK parliamentary by-election

The 1876 Frome by-election was fought on 23 November 1876. The by-election was fought due to the resignation of the incumbent Conservative MP, Henry Lopes in order to become a Judge of the High Court of Justice. It was won by the Liberal candidate Henry Samuelson.

== See also ==
- 1853 Frome by-election
- 1854 Frome by-election
- 1856 Frome by-election
