= Newbury (constituency) =

Parliamentary constituency in the United Kingdom, 1885 onwards

Coordinates: 51.43°N 1.38°W

- County constituency for the House of Commons
- Boundaries since 2024
- Boundary of Newbury in South East England
- County: Berkshire
- Electorate: 71,631 (2023)
- Major settlements: Newbury; Thatcham; Hungerford

Current constituency
- Created: 1885
- Member of Parliament: Lee Dillon (Liberal Democrats)
- Seats: One
- Created from: Berkshire

Newbury is a constituency of the Parliament of the United Kingdom, located in the English county of Berkshire. It was created by the Redistribution of Seats Act 1885 and has been in continual existence since then. It has been represented by Lee Dillon of the Liberal Democrats since 2024.

== Constituency profile ==
Newbury is a constituency within the West Berkshire district of Berkshire. It is named after its largest town, Newbury, which has a population of around 45,000. Other settlements in the constituency include the towns of Thatcham and Hungerford and the village of Lambourn.

This constituency is predominantly rural and lies almost entirely within the North Wessex Downs, a National Landscape of chalk hills. Most of the population is concentrated in the adjacent towns of Newbury and Thatcham. These towns are mostly affluent and form part of the M4 corridor, a major technology hub; Newbury hosts several company headquarters including that of Vodafone. The rural areas are also generally wealthy, and Lambourn and its surroundings are a nationally important centre for horse racing. House prices across the constituency are similar to the rest of South East England and higher than the national average.

In general, residents of the constituency have average levels of education and homeownership. Household income is high and the child poverty rate is around half the national figure. A high proportion of residents work in professional occupations, particularly in the technology and retail sectors, and a low percentage claim unemployment benefits. White people made up 93% of the population at the 2021 census.

At the local council, most of the constituency is represented by Liberal Democrat councillors with some Conservatives elected in the rural areas. An estimated 51% of voters in the constituency supported remaining in the European Union in the 2016 referendum, marginally higher than the nationwide figure of 48%.

== History ==
Originally, Newbury was part of a larger constituency of Berkshire, which returned two Members of Parliament (MPs), increased to three in the Reform Act 1832. In the Redistribution of Seats Act 1885 Berkshire was divided into three county constituencies, Northern (Abingdon), Southern (Newbury), and Eastern (Wokingham), and two borough constituencies, Reading and New Windsor, each returning one member.

The Conservatives have held the constituency for all but seventeen years since the creation of the seat – only three spells of Liberal Party, or Liberal Democrat, majorities have intersected their control. In 2015, the party held the largest majority in the seat since 1935 at 46%, before being reduced to 40.1% in 2017.

Since the February 1974 election, the Liberal Democrats have been one of the two largest parties in the constituency. They most recently gained the seat at the 1993 by-election, holding it until 2005 where it was regained by the Conservatives.

The constituency in 2010 produced the third lowest share of the vote for Labour (4.3%), one of five lost deposits for Labour nationally, below the 5% of the vote deposit threshold. (Note: Other lost Labour deposits took place in Eastbourne, Somerton & Frome, Cornwall North and Westmorland & Lonsdale) In 2017, Labour earned its highest share of the vote in Newbury since the October 1974 election with 14.1% of the vote.

It was estimated that the constituency voted 51% in favour of remaining in the European Union during the 2016 referendum on EU membership, with 49% voting to leave.

In December 2023, the Labour Party included the seat in its published list of 211 non-battleground seats, suggesting they did not see it as winnable.

== Boundaries and boundary changes ==
=== 1885–1918 ===
The constituency was created as the Southern or Newbury Division of Berkshire under the Redistribution of Seats Act 1885, when the three-member Parliamentary County of Berkshire was divided into the three single-member constituencies of Abingdon, Newbury and Wokingham. It comprised:

- The Boroughs of Newbury and Reading;
- the Sessional Divisions of Ilsley, Lambourn, Newbury (including Hungerford), and Reading (except the parishes of East Swallowfield and West Swallowfield); and
- Part of the Sessional Division of Wokingham.

Only non-resident freeholders of the municipal borough Reading (which comprised the Parliamentary Borough of Reading) were entitled to vote.

=== 1918–1950 ===
- The Boroughs of Newbury and Wokingham;
- The Rural Districts of Hungerford and Newbury; and
- Parts of the Rural Districts of Bradfield and Wokingham.

Extended eastwards, with the addition of Wokingham and surrounding areas from the abolished Wokingham Division. Small area in the north transferred to Abingdon and areas which had been annexed by Reading County Borough transferred to the Parliamentary Borough thereof.

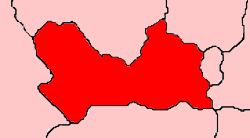
The Newbury constituency in 1954

=== 1950–1955 ===
- The Borough of Newbury; and
- The Rural Districts of Bradfield, Hungerford and Newbury.

Wokingham and rural areas to the south and east of Reading transferred to the re-established constituency of Wokingham. Small area transferred from Abingdon.

=== 1955–1974 ===
- The Borough of Newbury;
- The Rural Districts of Bradfield, Hungerford and Newbury; and
- The County Borough of Reading ward of Tilehurst.

Gained the Tilehurst ward from the abolished constituency of Reading North. From the 1964 general election, the wards of Norcot and Tilehurst were included following a revision to the local authority wards in Reading.

=== 1974–1983 ===
- The borough of Newbury; and
- The rural districts of Bradfield, Hungerford, and Newbury.

The two Reading wards were transferred back to the re-established constituency of Reading North. The boundary with Abingdon was slightly amended to take account of changes to local government boundaries.

=== 1983–1997 ===
- The District of Newbury wards of Aldermaston, Basildon, Beenham, Bradfield, Bucklebury, Burghfield, Chieveley, Cold Ash, Compton, Craven, Downlands, Falkland, Greenham, Hungerford, Kintbury, Lambourn Valley, Mortimer, Northcroft, St John's, Shaw-cum-Donnington, Speen, Thatcham North, Thatcham South, Thatcham West, Turnpike, and Winchcombe.

Gained a small area of the abolished constituency of Abingdon (part of the former Rural District of Wantage) which was retained by Berkshire when the rest of the area comprising Abingdon was transferred to Oxfordshire by the Local Government Act 1972. Areas to the west of Reading included in the new constituency of Reading West.

Map of 2010–2024 boundaries

=== 1997–2010 ===
- The District of Newbury wards of Aldermaston, Basildon, Beenham, Bradfield, Bucklebury, Chieveley, Cold Ash, Compton, Craven, Downlands, Falkland, Greenham, Hungerford, Kintbury, Lambourn Valley, Northcroft, St John's, Shaw-cum-Donnington, Speen, Thatcham North, Thatcham South, Thatcham West, Turnpike, and Winchcombe.

Small loss to Wokingham in the east of the constituency (Burghfield and Mortimer wards).

=== 2010–2024 ===
- The District of West Berkshire wards of Aldermaston, Basildon, Bucklebury, Chieveley, Clay Hill, Cold Ash, Compton, Downlands, Falkland, Greenham, Hungerford, Kintbury, Lambourn Valley, Northcroft, St John's, Speen, Thatcham Central, Thatcham North, Thatcham South and Crookham, Thatcham West, and Victoria.

Further minor loss to Wokingham.

=== 2024–present ===
Further to the 2023 periodic review of Westminster constituencies which became effective for the 2024 general election, the constituency is composed of the following (as they existed on 1 December 2020):

- The District of West Berkshire wards of: Chieveley & Cold Ash; Downlands (polling districts BG, CA, CB, EA, FA, FB, GA1, GA2, LB and PC); Hungerford & Kintbury; Lambourn; Newbury Central; Newbury Clay Hill; Newbury Greenham; Newbury Speen; Newbury Wash Common; Thatcham Central; Thatcham Colthrop & Crookham; Thatcham North East; Thatcham West.

The electorate was further reduced to bring it within the permitted range by transferring eastern, rural areas to the new constituency of Reading West and Mid Berkshire.

== Members of Parliament ==
An incumbent MP has been defeated five times, in the elections of 1906, 1923, 1924, 2005, and 2024.

Berkshire prior to 1885

Election	Member	Party
1885	William George Mount	Conservative
1900	William Mount	Conservative
1906	Frederick Coleridge Mackarness	Liberal
1910	William Mount	Conservative
1922	Howard Clifton Brown	Conservative
1923	Harold Stranger	Liberal
1924	Howard Clifton Brown	Conservative
1945	Anthony Hurd	Conservative
1964	John Astor	Conservative
Feb 1974	Sir Michael McNair-Wilson	Conservative
1992	Judith Chaplin	Conservative
1993 by-election	David Rendel	Liberal Democrat
2005	Richard Benyon	Conservative
2019	Richard Benyon	Independent
2019	Richard Benyon	Conservative
2019	Laura Farris	Conservative
2024	Lee Dillon	Liberal Democrat

== Elections ==
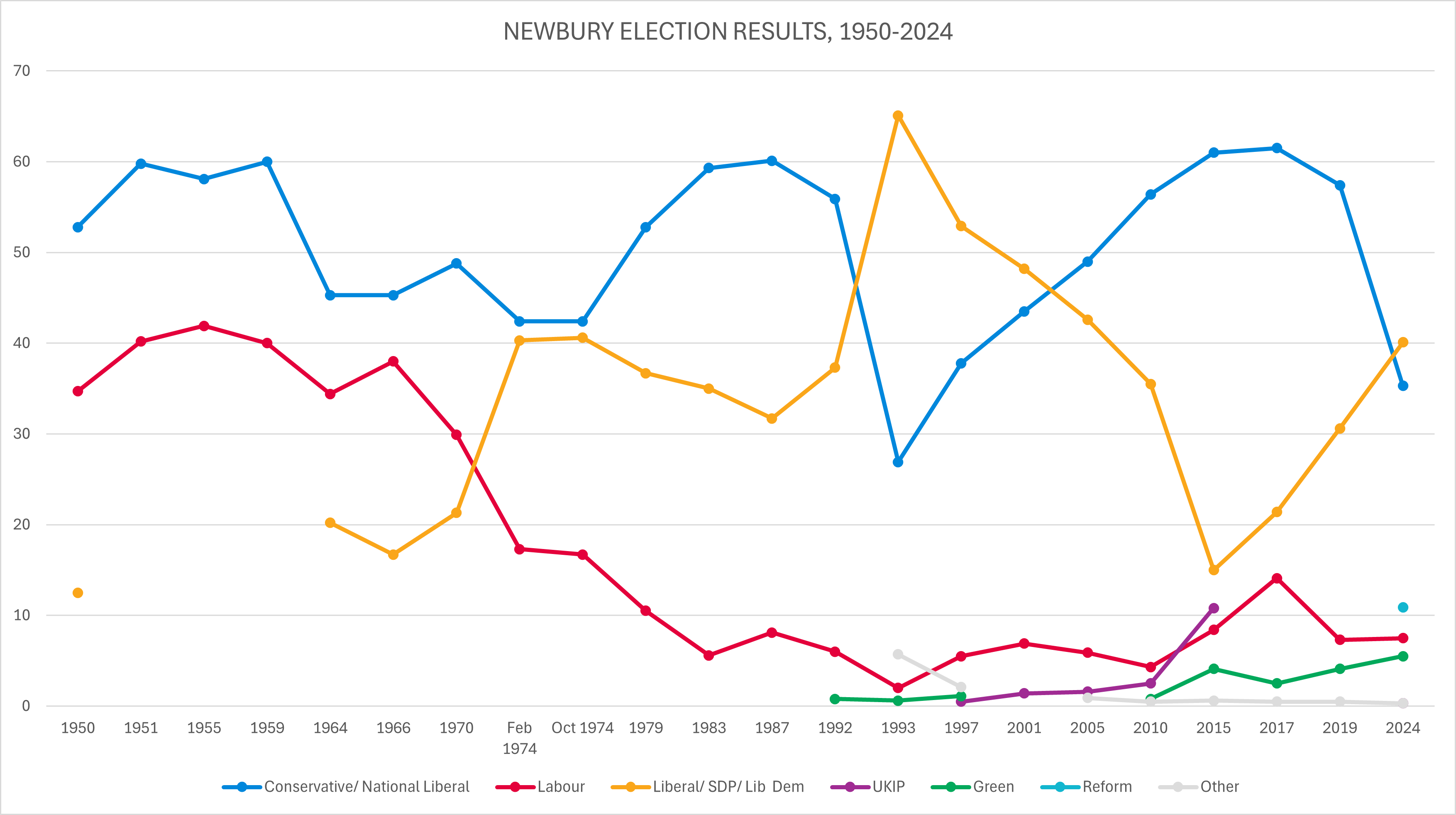
Election results 1950-2024

=== Elections in the 1880s ===
General election 1885: Newbury
Party	Candidate	Votes	%	±%
Conservative	William Mount	4,631	51.1	
Liberal	George Palmer	4,429	48.9	
Majority		202	2.2	
Turnout		9,060	86.7	
Registered electors		10,453		
Conservative win (new seat)				

General election 1886: Newbury
Party	Candidate	Votes	%	±%
Conservative	William Mount	Unopposed		
Conservative hold				

=== Elections in the 1890s ===
General election 1892: Newbury
Party	Candidate	Votes	%	±%
Conservative	William Mount	4,588	53.8	N/A
Liberal	Thomas Stevens	3,938	46.2	New
Majority		650	7.6	N/A
Turnout		8,526	82.5	N/A
Registered electors		10,338		
Conservative hold		Swing	N/A	

General election 1895: Newbury
Party	Candidate	Votes	%	±%
Conservative	William Mount	4,895	56.5	+2.7
Liberal	John Swinburne	3,766	43.5	−2.7
Majority		1,129	13.0	+5.4
Turnout		8,661	81.5	−1.0
Registered electors		10,621		
Conservative hold		Swing	+2.7	

=== Elections in the 1900s ===
General election 1900: Newbury
Party	Candidate	Votes	%	±%
Conservative	William Mount	Unopposed		
Conservative hold				

Mackarness

General election 1906: Newbury
Party	Candidate	Votes	%	±%
Liberal	Frederick Mackarness	5,338	52.0	New
Conservative	William Mount	4,936	48.0	N/A
Majority		402	4.0	N/A
Turnout		10,274	87.5	N/A
Registered electors		11,746		
Liberal gain from Conservative		Swing	N/A	

=== Elections in the 1910s ===
General election January 1910: Newbury
Party	Candidate	Votes	%	±%
Conservative	William Mount	7,081	60.0	+12.0
Liberal	Thomas Hedderwick	4,723	40.0	−12.0
Majority		2,358	20.0	N/A
Turnout		11,804	90.4	+2.9
Conservative gain from Liberal		Swing		

General election December 1910: Newbury
Party	Candidate	Votes	%	±%
Conservative	William Mount	6,485	60.3	+0.3
Liberal	Lisle March-Phillipps	4,278	39.7	−0.3
Majority		2,207	20.4	+0.4
Turnout		10,763	82.4	−8.0
Conservative hold		Swing		

General election 1918: Newbury
Party		Candidate	Votes	%	±%
C	Unionist	William Mount	Unopposed		
	Unionist hold				
C indicates candidate endorsed by the coalition government.

=== Elections in the 1920s ===
By-election, 1922: Newbury
Party		Candidate	Votes	%	±%
C	Unionist	Howard Clifton Brown	Unopposed		
	Unionist hold				
C indicates candidate endorsed by the coalition government.

General election 1922: Newbury
Party	Candidate	Votes	%	±%
Unionist	Howard Clifton Brown	12,322	57.4	N/A
Liberal	Harold Stranger	9,144	42.6	New
Majority		3,178	14.8	N/A
Turnout		21,466	69.7	N/A
Unionist hold		Swing	N/A	

General election 1923: Newbury
Party	Candidate	Votes	%	±%
Liberal	Harold Stranger	11,226	50.1	+7.5
Unionist	Howard Clifton Brown	11,185	49.9	−7.5
Majority		41	0.2	N/A
Turnout		22,411	71.3	+1.6
Liberal gain from Unionist		Swing	+7.5	

General election 1924: Newbury
Party	Candidate	Votes	%	±%
Unionist	Howard Clifton Brown	14,759	55.9	+6.0
Liberal	Harold Stranger	10,444	39.5	−10.6
Labour	Frank Jacques	1,219	4.6	New
Majority		4,315	16.4	N/A
Turnout		26,422	80.9	+9.6
Unionist gain from Liberal		Swing		

General election 1929: Newbury
Party	Candidate	Votes	%	±%
Unionist	Howard Clifton Brown	17,800	51.0	−4.9
Liberal	Edward Harold Brooks	13,604	39.0	−0.5
Labour	Frank Jacques	3,471	10.0	+5.4
Majority		4,196	12.0	−4.4
Turnout		34,875	78.3	−2.6
Unionist hold		Swing	-2.2	

=== Elections in the 1930s ===
1931 general election: Newbury
Party	Candidate	Votes	%	±%
Conservative	Howard Clifton Brown	Unopposed		
Conservative hold		Swing	N/A	

General election 1935: Newbury
Party	Candidate	Votes	%	±%
Conservative	Howard Clifton Brown	24,642	73.0	N/A
Labour	Richard Russell	9,125	27.0	New
Majority		15,517	46.0	N/A
Turnout		33,767	65.5	N/A
Conservative hold		Swing	N/A	

=== Elections in the 1940s ===
General election 1945: Newbury
Party	Candidate	Votes	%	±%
Conservative	Anthony Hurd	24,463	52.4	−20.6
Labour	Iris Brook	15,754	33.7	+6.7
Liberal	Eric Digby Tempest Vane	6,052	13.0	New
Common Wealth	George Booth Suggett	424	0.9	New
Majority		8,709	18.7	−27.3
Turnout		46,693	65.4	−0.1
Conservative hold		Swing		

=== Elections in the 1950s ===
General election 1950: Newbury
Party	Candidate	Votes	%	±%
Conservative	Anthony Hurd	18,150	52.8	+0.4
Labour	Colin Jackson	11,914	34.7	+1.0
Liberal	Edwin Burrows	4,284	12.5	−0.5
Majority		6,236	18.1	−0.6
Turnout		34,348	81.1	+15.7
Conservative hold		Swing		

General election 1951: Newbury
Party	Candidate	Votes	%	±%
Conservative	Anthony Hurd	20,102	59.8	+7.0
Labour	Colin Jackson	13,507	40.2	+5.5
Majority		6,595	19.6	+1.5
Turnout		33,609	78.7	−2.4
Conservative hold		Swing		

General election 1955: Newbury
Party	Candidate	Votes	%	±%
Conservative	Anthony Hurd	29,703	58.1	−1.7
Labour	Jon Evans	18,843	41.9	+1.7
Majority		7,237	16.2	−3.4
Turnout		48,546	78.3	−0.4
Conservative hold		Swing		

General election 1959: Newbury
Party	Candidate	Votes	%	±%
Conservative	Anthony Hurd	29,703	60.0	+1.9
Labour	David Stoddart	19,787	40.0	−1.9
Majority		9,916	20.0	+3.8
Turnout		49,490	78.7	+0.4
Conservative hold		Swing		

=== Elections in the 1960s ===
General election 1964: Newbury
Party	Candidate	Votes	%	±%
Conservative	John Astor	24,936	45.3	−14.7
Labour	David Stoddart	18,943	34.4	−5.6
Liberal	Denis Egginton	11,124	20.2	New
Majority		5,993	10.9	−9.1
Turnout		55,003	79.3	+0.6
Conservative hold		Swing		

General election 1966: Newbury
Party	Candidate	Votes	%	±%
Conservative	John Astor	25,908	45.3	0.0
Labour	Ronald Spiller	21,762	38.0	+3.6
Liberal	Stanley Clement Davies	9,571	16.7	−3.5
Majority		4,146	7.3	−3.6
Turnout		57,241	79.1	−0.2
Conservative hold		Swing		

=== Elections in the 1970s ===
General election 1970: Newbury
Party	Candidate	Votes	%	±%
Conservative	John Astor	30,380	48.8	+3.5
Labour	Timothy Sims	18,647	29.9	−8.1
Liberal	Dane Clouston	13,279	21.3	+4.6
Majority		11,733	18.9	+11.6
Turnout		55,392	72.6	−6.5
Conservative hold		Swing		

General election February 1974: Newbury
Party	Candidate	Votes	%	±%
Conservative	Michael McNair-Wilson	24,620	42.4	−6.4
Liberal	Dane Clouston	23,419	40.3	+19.0
Labour	Celia Fletcher	10,935	17.3	−12.6
Majority		1,201	2.1	−16.7
Turnout		58,974	80.8	+8.2
Conservative hold		Swing		

After the 1970 general election, Newbury's boundaries were altered to reduce the size of the electorate which had grown to over 85,000. After the boundary changes, the electorate numbered around 72,000 people. This came into effect for the first general election in February 1974.

General election October 1974: Newbury
Party	Candidate	Votes	%	±%
Conservative	Michael McNair-Wilson	23,499	42.4	0.0
Liberal	Dane Clouston	22,477	40.6	+0.3
Labour	Celia Fletcher	9,390	16.7	−0.6
Majority		1,022	1.8	−0.3
Turnout		55,366	76.3	−4.5
Conservative hold		Swing		

General election 1979: Newbury
Party	Candidate	Votes	%	±%
Conservative	Michael McNair-Wilson	33,677	52.8	+10.4
Liberal	Anthony Richards	23,388	36.7	−3.9
Labour	Joan Ruddock	6,676	10.5	−6.2
Majority		10,289	16.1	+14.3
Turnout		63,741	79.3	+3.0
Conservative hold		Swing		

=== Elections in the 1980s ===
General election 1983: Newbury
Party	Candidate	Votes	%	±%
Conservative	Michael McNair-Wilson	31,836	59.3	+6.2
Alliance (Liberal)	Anthony Richards	18,798	35.0	−1.0
Labour	Richard Knight	3,027	5.6	−5.2
Majority		13,038	24.3	+7.2
Turnout		53,661	75.2	−4.1
Conservative hold		Swing		

General election 1987: Newbury
Party	Candidate	Votes	%	±%
Conservative	Michael McNair-Wilson	35,266	60.1	+0.8
Alliance (Liberal)	David Rendel	18,608	31.7	−3.3
Labour	Robert Stapley	4,765	8.1	+2.5
Majority		16,658	28.4	+4.1
Turnout		58,639	78.0	+2.8
Conservative hold		Swing		

=== Elections in the 1990s ===
General election 1992: Newbury
Party	Candidate	Votes	%	±%
Conservative	Judith Chaplin	37,135	55.9	−4.2
Liberal Democrats	David Rendel	24,778	37.3	+5.6
Labour	Richard J E Hall	3,962	6.0	−2.1
Green	Jim Wallis	539	0.8	New
Majority		12,357	18.6	−9.8
Turnout		66,414	82.8	+4.8
Conservative hold		Swing	−4.9	

1993 Newbury by-election
Party	Candidate	Votes	%	±%
Liberal Democrats	David Rendel	37,590	65.1	+27.8
Conservative	Julian Davidson	15,535	26.9	−29.0
Labour	Steve Billcliffe	1,151	2.0	−4.0
Anti-Federalist League	Alan Sked	601	1.0	New
Conservative Candidate	Andrew Bannon	561	1.0	New
Commoners' Party	Stephen Martin	435	0.8	New
Monster Raving Loony	Screaming Lord Sutch	432	0.7	New
Green	Jim Wallis	341	0.6	−0.2
Referendum Party	Robin Marlar	338	0.6	New
Conservative Rebel	John Browne	267	0.5	New
Corrective Party	Lindi St Clair	170	0.3	New
Maastricht Referendum for Britain	Bill Board	84	0.1	New
Natural Law	Michael Grenville	60	0.1	New
People & Pensioners Party	Johnathon Day	49	0.1	New
21st Century Independent Foresters	Colin Palmer	40	0.1	New
Defence of Children's Humanity Bosnia	Mladen Grbin	33	0.1	New
SDP	Alan Page	33	0.1	New
Communist (PCC)	Anne Murphy	32	0.1	New
Give The Royal Billions To Schools	Michael Stone	21	0.1	New
Majority		22,055	38.2	N/A
Turnout		57,399	71.3	−11.5
Liberal Democrats gain from Conservative		Swing	+28.4	

General election 1997: Newbury
Party	Candidate	Votes	%	±%
Liberal Democrats	David Rendel	29,887	52.9	+15.8
Conservative	Richard Benyon	21,370	37.8	−18.1
Labour	Paul Hannon	3,107	5.5	−0.6
Referendum	Ted Snook	992	1.8	New
Green	Rachel Stark	644	1.1	N/A
UKIP	R Tubb	302	0.5	New
Socialist Labour	Katrina Howse	174	0.3	New
Majority		8,517	15.1	N/A
Turnout		56,476	76.3	+5.0
Liberal Democrats gain from Conservative		Swing		

=== Elections in the 2000s ===
General election 2001: Newbury
Party	Candidate	Votes	%	±%
Liberal Democrats	David Rendel	24,507	48.2	−4.7
Conservative	Richard Benyon	22,092	43.5	+5.7
Labour	Steve Billcliffe	3,523	6.9	+1.4
UKIP	Delphine Gray-Fisk	685	1.4	+0.9
Majority		2,415	4.7	−10.4
Turnout		50,807	67.3	−9.0
Liberal Democrats hold		Swing		

General election 2005: Newbury
Party	Candidate	Votes	%	±%
Conservative	Richard Benyon	26,771	49.0	+5.5
Liberal Democrats	David Rendel	23,311	42.6	−5.6
Labour	Oscar Van Nooijen	3,239	5.9	−1.0
UKIP	David McMahon	857	1.6	+0.2
Independent	Nick Cornish	409	0.7	New
Independent	Barrie Singleton	86	0.2	New
Majority		3,460	6.4	N/A
Turnout		54,673	72.0	+4.7
Conservative gain from Liberal Democrats		Swing		

=== Elections in the 2010s ===
General election 2010: Newbury
Party	Candidate	Votes	%	±%
Conservative	Richard Benyon	33,057	56.4	+7.4
Liberal Democrats	David Rendel	20,809	35.5	−7.1
Labour	Hannah Cooper	2,505	4.3	−1.7
UKIP	David Black	1,475	2.5	+0.9
Green	Adrian Hollister	490	0.8	New
Independent	Brian Burgess	158	0.3	New
Apolitical Democrat	David Yates	95	0.2	New
Majority		12,248	20.9	+14.6
Turnout		58,589	70.2	−2.4
Conservative hold		Swing	+7.3	

General election 2015: Newbury
Party	Candidate	Votes	%	±%
Conservative	Richard Benyon	34,973	61.0	+4.6
Liberal Democrats	Judith Bunting	8,605	15.0	−20.5
UKIP	Catherine Anderson	6,195	10.8	+8.3
Labour	Jonny Roberts	4,837	8.4	+4.1
Green	Paul Field	2,324	4.1	+3.3
Apolitical Democrats	Peter Norman	228	0.4	+0.2
Independent	Barrie Singleton	85	0.1	New
Patriotic Socialist Party	Andrew Stott	53	0.1	New
Majority		26,368	46.0	+25.1
Turnout		57,300	72.1	+1.9
Conservative hold		Swing	+12.6	

General election 2017: Newbury
Party	Candidate	Votes	%	±%
Conservative	Richard Benyon	37,399	61.5	+0.5
Liberal Democrats	Judith Bunting	13,019	21.4	+6.4
Labour	Alex Skirvin	8,596	14.1	+5.7
Green	Paul Field	1,531	2.5	−1.6
Apolitical Democrats	Dave Yates	304	0.5	+0.1
Majority		24,380	40.1	−5.9
Turnout		60,849	73.4	+1.3
Conservative hold		Swing	-3.0	

General election 2019: Newbury
Party	Candidate	Votes	%	±%
Conservative	Laura Farris	34,431	57.4	−4.1
Liberal Democrats	Lee Dillon	18,384	30.6	+9.2
Labour	James Wilder	4,404	7.3	−6.8
Green	Stephen Masters	2,454	4.1	+1.6
Independent	Ben Holden-Crowther	325	0.5	New
Majority		16,047	26.8	−13.3
Turnout		59,998	71.9	−1.5
Conservative hold		Swing	-6.7	

2019 notional result
Party	Vote	%
Conservative	28,075	55.1
Liberal Democrats	16,615	32.6
Labour	3,929	7.7
Green	2,027	4.0
Others	325	0.6
Turnout	50,971	71.2
Electorate	71,631	

=== Elections in the 2020s ===
General election 2024: Newbury
Party	Candidate	Votes	%	±%
Liberal Democrats	Lee Dillon	19,645	40.1	+7.5
Conservative	Laura Farris	17,268	35.3	−19.8
Reform	Doug Terry	5,357	10.9	N/A
Labour	Liz Bell	3,662	7.5	−0.2
Green	Stephen Masters	2,714	5.5	+1.5
Freedom Alliance	Earl Jesse	153	0.3	N/A
UKIP	Gary Johnson	131	0.3	N/A
Majority		2,377	4.8	N/A
Turnout		48,930	68.0	–3.2
Registered electors		71,986		
Liberal Democrats gain from Conservative		Swing	+13.7	

== See also ==
- List of parliamentary constituencies in Berkshire
- List of parliamentary constituencies in the South East England (region)

== Sources ==
- "Newbury election history". Newbury. Archived from the original on 29 July 2001.
- "Parliament.uk: 1992 elections" (PDF). Highest and lowest shares of the vote by party. Archived from the original (PDF) on 8 December 2005.
- "Newbury 1993". Candidate names. Archived from the original on 22 August 2009.
- "Election data from 1832". Newbury constituency 1959 onwards.
- "Boundary Commission for England". Boundary changes. Archived from the original on 12 March 2005.
- David Boothroyd. "Smallest majorities at elections since 1918". 1923 Majority. Archived from the original on 11 May 2008.
- BBC: Newbury constituency (2001)
- McCalmont, Frederick Haynes, Stenton Michael, Vincent, John Russell. McCalmont's parliamentary poll book: British election results. (ISBN 0-85527-000-4)
- F. W. S. Craig. British Parliamentary Election Results 1950–1973. (ISBN 0-900178-07-8)
- F. W. S. Craig. British Parliamentary Election Results 1918–1949. (ISBN 0-900178-01-9)
