= Edmund Boyle, 8th Earl of Cork =

British Army general

General Edmund Boyle, 8th Earl of Cork and 8th Earl of Orrery, KP (21 October 1767 – 29 June 1856), styled Viscount Dungarvan from 1768 to 1798, was an Irish soldier and peer.

== Early life ==
Boyle was the eldest surviving son of Edmund Boyle, 7th Earl of Cork and his first wife Anne, daughter of Kellond Courtenay of Painsford in Devon.

== Career ==
Commissioned an ensign in the 22nd Regiment of Foot on 16 April 1785, he was promoted to lieutenant in the 100th Regiment of Foot on 10 December 1785.

On 27 May 1787, he was commissioned a lieutenant in the 1st Somerset Militia, (commanded by his father) and was promoted from captain-lieutenant to captain on 22 April 1789.

On 27 January 1791, he was promoted captain in an independent company, from a lieutenancy in the 34th Regiment of Foot, and shortly thereafter exchanged into the 14th Regiment of Foot. On 5 April 1794, he was promoted to major in the recently raised 87th Regiment of Foot, and was promoted to lieutenant-colonel in the regiment on 19 July. On 20 January 1795, he exchanged into the 11th Regiment of Foot. Dungarvan exchanged into the captaincy of a company in the Coldstream Guards on 21 May 1796, and was appointed an aide-de-camp to George III on 9 January 1798.

In July 1803, he exchanged from the half-pay of the 4th Regiment of Foot to become colonel of a reserve battalion of infantry, the 16th Garrison Battalion. On 27 May 1825, he was breveted general. The Earl was appointed a Knight of the Order of St Patrick on 22 July 1835.

== Personal life ==
In January 1791, when styled Viscount Dungarvan, he hired a prostitute named Elizabeth Weldon from the Covent Garden Theatre and went to her home in Hackney, London. She then attempted to extort him, and when he refused, she accused him of stealing three and a half guineas from her (equivalent to £559 in 2023). Dungarvan was put on trial at the Old Bailey, where a jury found him not guilty. The judge nonetheless admonished him, telling him from the bench, "My Lord Dungarvan, it is but justice to you to say, that it is impossible for you to go from this bar with the least imputation on your character. Of the impudence that brought you into the situation I say nothing, as you yourself seem to be perfectly sensible of it."

On 9 October 1795, he married his first cousin Isabella Henrietta Poyntz (d. 29 November 1843), daughter of William Poyntz (1734–1809) and his wife Isabella, daughter of Kellond Courtenay. His younger brother, Sir Courtenay Boyle, later married Isabella Henrietta's sister Carolina Amelia in 1799; the sisters' brother was William Stephen Poyntz MP. Edmund and Isabella had nine children:

- Lady Isabella Elizabeth Boyle (4 February 1797 – 27 December 1829)
- Edmund William Boyle, Viscount Dungarvan (2 April 1798 – 1 January 1826)
- Hon. George Richard Boyle (22 September 1799 – 8 September 1810)
- Charles Boyle, Viscount Dungarvan (6 December 1800 – 25 August 1834), married on 18 March 1828 Lady Catherine St Lawrence, daughter of William St Lawrence, 2nd Earl of Howth, and had issue, including Richard Boyle, 9th Earl of Cork and William George Boyle.
- Hon. John Boyle (13 March 1803 – 6 December 1874), married on 10 December 1835 Hon. Cecilia de Ros, daughter of Lord Henry FitzGerald, and had issue
- Lady Lucy Georgina Boyle (19 March 1804 – 31 August 1827)
- Lady Louisa Boyle (16 September 1806 – 30 May 1826)
- Lt-Col Hon. Robert Edward Boyle (1809–1854)
- Rev. Hon. Richard Cavendish Boyle (28 February 1812 – 30 March 1886), chaplain to Queen Victoria, married Eleanor Vere Gordon, daughter of Alexander Gordon and had issue.

In Somerset, he lived at Marston House within the grounds of Marston Bigot Park. He employed Jeffry Wyattville in 1817 to embellish the central block with four Ionic columns. Wyattville was known locally for his work at Longleat and then at the Church of St John the Baptist, Frome in the same decade.

In 1821, on the corner of the then-named Hill Street and the Market Place in Frome, the Earl was persuaded by Thomas Bunn to build an Assembly Room above a covered market, in the style of the Greek revival; in 1822, the street was renamed Cork Street. He had been shown by Bunn an image of the Roman Forum as 'a good design for a modern market-place'; he had demurred and 'thought of economy and said it would not pay'. Bunn's persuasion paid off; it remains one of Frome's notable buildings, now a bank with the ground floor enclosed. They worked together on various other projects, including the National and Christ Church Schools, with the Earl as the chair of the committee. The Earl contributed to local charities such as the Blanket Fund and the Coal Fund, both for the relief of the poor, and chaired meetings of the Frome Savings Bank.

Thomas Bunn thought highly of him as 'a kind friend to the inhabitants of Frome'. In November 1838 he recorded an incident in the Magistrate's Court when, finding the room very crowded, the Earl took up his own coat from the bench beside him and offered Bunn a seat: 'not as a mark of attention to me but of gentlemanly conduct'.

He died on 29 June 1856 and was succeeded by his grandson Richard.

In 1857 his youngest son, Richard Boyle, vicar of Marston, had a school and schoolhouse built "For The Benefit of The Poor And in Memory of His father" on Tuckmarsh Lane along the southeast boundary of the family estate.

Military offices
New regiment	Colonel of the 16th Garrison Battalion; 1803–1805	Regiment disbanded
Peerage of Ireland
Preceded by Edmund Boyle	Earl of Cork; Earl of Orrery; 1798–1856	Succeeded by Richard Boyle
