= William George Mount =

British landowner and Conservative politician

William George Mount DL (18 July 1824 – 14 January 1906) was a British landowner, Conservative politician, and the first Member of Parliament for the Newbury constituency.

He was educated at Eton College and Balliol College, Oxford.

The son of William Mount, of Wasing Place, Berkshire, he became a Magistrate in 1851, and High Sheriff in 1877. He was narrowly elected in the general election of 1885, beating his Liberal opponent by 202 votes. He was chairman of Quarter Sessions from 1887 to 1902, and was the first Chairman of Berkshire County Council from 1889 to 1906.

He served as MP for Newbury for 15 years until standing down at the 1900 general election.

He was the father of Sir William Mount, 1st Baronet, brother-in-law of Richard Fellowes Benyon, MP, of Englefield and great-great grandfather to David Cameron, who was Prime Minister of the United Kingdom from 2010 to 2016.

Parliament of the United Kingdom
New constituency	Member of Parliament for Newbury; 1885–1900	Succeeded by William Arthur Mount
Honorary titles
Preceded by John Hargreaves	High Sheriff of Berkshire; 1877	Succeeded by Arthur Smith
