= Family of David Cameron =

Relatives of former Prime Minister and Foreign Secretary of the UK David Cameron

Lord Cameron's patrilineal coat of arms

Relatives of the former UK prime minister and former foreign secretary, David Cameron, feature throughout the law, politics and finance as well as being connected with the British aristocracy.

== Immediate family ==
Left to right: Enid Watson with Ian and Mary Cameron, the parents and paternal grandmother of David Cameron, 1970s

The younger son of stockbroker Ian Donald Cameron (12 October 1932 – 8 September 2010), his mother Mary Fleur née Mount (22 October 1934 – 2 February 2025), a justice of the peace, was the second daughter of Sir William Mount.

His father, Ian Cameron, was born with both legs deformed and underwent repeated operations to correct them. Cameron's parents were married in 1962. Born in London (although sometimes incorrectly reported as being born at Blairmore House near Huntly, Aberdeenshire), his father was brought up at Peasemore, Berkshire, and died near Toulon in France on 8 September 2010. Ian's paternal grandmother was Rachel Margaret Geddes, whose family were seated at Blairmore.

According to the Feminist Times, as a magistrate, Mary Cameron gave prison sentences for anti-nuclear weapons protesters at the Greenham Common Women's Peace Camp.

Cameron has two sisters, Tania Rachel (born 1965) and Clare Louise (born April 1971).

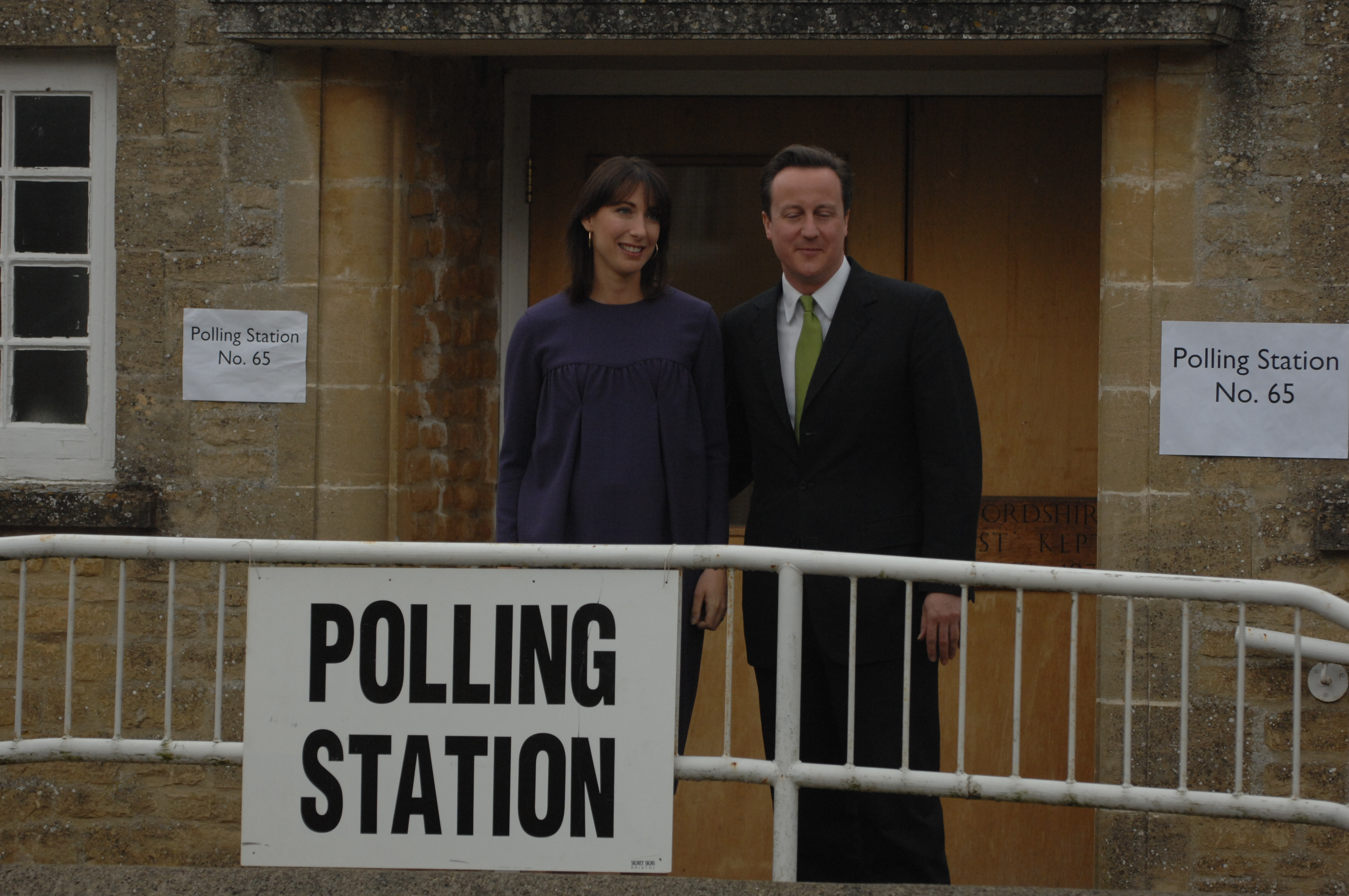
Samantha and David Cameron on the UK 2010 general election day.

His elder brother, Alexander Cameron (1963–2023), died of cancer.

His wife Samantha, the elder daughter of Sir Reginald Sheffield and Annabel née Jones (now Viscountess Astor), is descended from an illegitimate son of John Sheffield, 1st Duke of Buckingham and Normanby.

Lady Cameron of Chipping Norton, maternal granddaughter of the Hon. Sir Bede Clifford, also counts among her relatives numerous English noble and gentry families.

== Ancestry ==
Enid Levita (right), paternal grandmother of David Cameron, wearing the uniform of Sussex County Guides, c. 1930

=== Alexander Geddes ===
Blairmore House, was built by his great-grandfather, Alexander Geddes (1843–1902), who had made a fortune trading grain in Chicago and returned to Scotland in the 1880s.

=== Aristocratic and Royal connections ===
A descendant, via a cadet branch, of the 13th Lochiel, Chief of Clan Cameron, David Cameron was raised to the peerage as a Life Baron by King Charles III in 2023, but holds no hereditary titles. However, he has several distant familial connections to the British nobility.

Cameron descends from King William IV and his mistress Dorothea Jordan, through their illegitimate daughter Lady Elizabeth FitzClarence to the fifth-female-generation Enid Agnes Maud Levita. Therefore, through his descent from William IV's father, George III, Cameron is sixth cousin once removed to King Charles III. His father's maternal grandmother, Stephanie Levita (née Cooper), daughter of Sir Alfred Cooper and Lady Agnes Duff (sister of Alexander Duff, 1st Duke of Fife) was a sister of Duff Cooper, 1st Viscount Norwich, the Conservative statesman and author. His paternal grandmother, Enid Levita, who married secondly in 1961 the Hon. Robert Watson (younger son of the 1st Baron Manton), was the daughter of Arthur Levita and niece of Sir Cecil Levita, chairman of London County Council in 1928. Through Lord Manton's family, Cameron is also a kinsman of the 3rd Baron Hesketh, Conservative Lords Chief Whip 1991–93. (Note: Through his father's maternal grandmother Stephanie Levita, daughter of the society surgeon Sir Alfred Cooper, who was also father of the statesman and author Duff Cooper, 1st Viscount Norwich, grandfather of the publisher and man of letters Rupert Hart-Davis and historian John Julius Norwich, and great-grandfather of the TV presenter Adam Hart-Davis and journalist/writer Duff Hart-Davis (David Cameron's second cousins once removed) Cameron's mother is first cousin of the writer and political commentator Sir Ferdinand Mount.) Cameron's maternal grandfather was Sir William Mount, 2nd Baronet, a British Army officer and High Sheriff of Berkshire, and Cameron's maternal great-grandfather was Sir William Mount, 1st Baronet, Conservative MP for Newbury 1910–1922. Lady Ida Feilding, Cameron's great-great-grandmother, was the third daughter of William Feilding, 7th Earl of Denbigh, a courtier and Gentleman of the Bedchamber.

=== Finance ===
Arms of Sir Ewen Cameron

Cameron's forebears have a long history in finance. His father Ian Cameron was senior partner of the stockbrokers Panmure Gordon & Co., in which firm partnerships had long been held by Cameron's ancestors, including his grandfather and great-grandfather, and was a director of estate agent John D. Wood. His great-great-grandfather Emile Levita, a German Jewish financier who obtained British citizenship in 1871, was a director of the Chartered Bank of India, Australia and China which became Standard Chartered Bank in 1969. Sir Ewen Cameron, his patrilineal great-great-grandfather, was London chairman of the Hong Kong and Shanghai Bank, who played a key role in arranging loans from the Rothschild family to Japan during the Russo-Japanese War. Great-grandfather, Ewen Allan Cameron, was a partner of Panmure Gordon stockbrokers and served on the boards of the Corporation of Foreign Bondholders, and the Committee for Chinese Bondholders (set up by Bank of England governor, Sir Montagu Norman, in November 1935).

In 1982, Ian Cameron was instrumental in establishing Panamanian Blairmore Holdings, an offshore investment fund, valued around $20 million in 1988. This investment fund used controversial bearer shares until 2006. Ian Cameron was named in the Panama Papers, documents leaked in April 2016 from the Panama-based legal and business services company Mossack Fonseca.

== Notable living relations ==
Cameron is a nephew of Sir William Dugdale, brother-in-law of Kathryn, Lady Dugdale (died 2004, former Lady-in-Waiting to The Queen), who was Chairman of Aston Villa Football Club. Birmingham-born documentary filmmaker Joshua Dugdale is his cousin. Cameron's other notable relations include Adam Hart-Davis, Duff Hart-Davis, and Sir Ferdinand Mount, Bt).

== See also ==
- Armorial of Prime Ministers of the United Kingdom
