= Alexander Cameron (barrister) =

English barrister (1963–2023)

Alexander Cameron KC
- Born: Allan Alexander Cameron; 27 August 1963; London, England
- Died: 21 March 2023 (aged 59); Peasemore, West Berkshire, England
- Education: Eton College; University of Bristol
- Occupation: Barrister
- Spouse: Sarah Louise Fearnley-Whittingstall
- Children: 2
- Parents: Ian Donald Cameron (father); Mary Fleur Mount (mother)
- Relatives: David Cameron (brother)

Allan Alexander Cameron (27 August 1963 – 21 March 2023) was an English barrister. He was the elder brother of the British prime minister David Cameron.

== Family and education ==
Cameron was the elder son of Ian Donald Cameron (1932–2010) and Mary Fleur Mount (1934−2025), and the brother of David Cameron. He was educated at Heatherdown School, Eton College and the University of Bristol (LLB), and called to the bar from the Inner Temple in 1986.

In 1990 he married the lawyer Sarah Louise Fearnley-Whittingstall, cousin of the chef Hugh Fearnley-Whittingstall, and had two children, Imogen and Angus.

== Career ==
On 31 October 2013, Cameron appeared in some of the first television footage to be broadcast from the Court of Appeal of England and Wales since 1925, according to ITV. Sky News reported that he was the first barrister to be shown on television arguing a case in the Court of Appeal. It happened on the first day cameras were allowed into the court after a ban of 90 years. Cameron said "It's surprising. I only found out yesterday it was happening." The Guardian characterised him as "making television history".

In 2014 he appeared pro bono for the defence in a fraud trial, where the judge halted the trial on the grounds that the defendants could not receive a properly funded defence for a lengthy complex trial.

Some of his high-profile cases included heading the legal chambers that represented Rebekah Brooks in a phone-hacking defence.

Cameron was diagnosed with pancreatic cancer in 2020 and subsequently retired from the bar. He died in Peasemore, Berkshire, on 21 March 2023, at the age of 59.

== Ancestry ==
Ancestors of Alexander Cameron (barrister)

16. Sir Ewen Cameron
8. Ewen Allan Cameron
17. Josephine Elizabeth Houchen
4. Ewen Donald Cameron
18. Alexander Geddes
9. Rachel Margaret Geddes
19. Frances Robertson Sharp
2. Ian Donald Cameron
20. Emilie G. C. Levita
10. Arthur Francis Levita
21. Catherine Plumridge Ree
5. Enid Agnes Maud Levita
22. Sir Alfred Cooper
11. Stephanie Agnes Cooper
23. Lady Agnes Cecil Emmeline Duff
1. Alexander Cameron
24. Sir William George Mount
12. Sir William Arthur Mount, 1st Baronet
25. Marianne Emily Clutterbuck
6. Sir William Malcolm Mount, 2nd Baronet
26. William Malcolm Low
13. Hilda Lucy Adelaide Low
27. Lady Ida Matilda Alice Feilding
3. Mary Fleur Mount
28. Colonel Evan Henry Llewellyn
14. Owen John Llewellyn
29. Mary Blanche Somers
7. Elizabeth Nance Llewellyn
30. William John Mann
15. Anna Elizabeth Mann
31. Julia Brown
