= Philip Delves Broughton =

British journalist and author

- Born: Dacca, Bangladesh
- Education: Oxford University; Harvard Business School
- Occupations: Journalist and author
- Writing career
- Period: 1994–present
- Genre: Non-fiction
- Notable works: The Art of the Sale (2012); Ahead of the Curve (2008)

Philip Delves Broughton is a British journalist and author known for his business journalism, such as in his books Ahead of the Curve (2008), and The Art of the Sale (2012).

== Biography ==
He has written six books. He was born in Dacca, Bangladesh, where his father worked as a Church of England missionary and his mother spent four years after leaving Burma with her family following the 1962 Burmese coup d'état. He grew up in England, received his BA in classics from Oxford University and his MBA from Harvard Business School.

=== Journalism ===
From 1994 to 2004 he was a newspaper journalist. From 1998 to 2002, he was New York City correspondent for the Daily Telegraph of London, and covered the 9/11 attacks and their aftermath. From 2002 to 2004 he was the Telegraph's Paris Bureau Chief. He left daily journalism in 2004 to go to Harvard.

Subsequently, he has been a columnist for The Financial Times and the Evening Standard and writes regularly for the Wall Street Journal, The Spectator and The Oldie

=== Books ===
- Ahead of the Curve (2008)
- What They Teach You At Harvard Business School (2008)
- The Art of the Sale (2012)
- Charlie Whistler's Omnium Gatherum (2016, Children's book)
- How to Think Like an Entrepreneur (2016)
- Embargo: How the 1973 Oil Crisis Changed the World (2026)
