= Harry Mount =

British author and journalist (born 1971)

- Born: Henry Francis Mount; 1971 (age 54–55); Lambeth, London, England
- Education: North Bridge House School; Westminster School
- Alma mater: Magdalen College, Oxford; Courtauld Institute
- Occupations: Journalist, author
- Parent: Ferdinand Mount
- Relatives: David Cameron (second cousin)

Henry Francis Mount (born 1971) is a British author and journalist, who is the editor of The Oldie magazine, and a frequent contributor to the Daily Mail and The Daily Telegraph.

== Early life ==
Harry Mount was born in 1971. His father, Sir Ferdinand Mount, Bt, FRSL, is also a journalist, and was an advisor to Prime Minister Margaret Thatcher. One of his second cousins is the former British prime minister David Cameron.

Mount was educated at the North Bridge House School in London, followed by Westminster School, where he was an Honorary Scholar. He then read Ancient and Modern History at Magdalen College, Oxford, graduating with a first. At Oxford he was a member of the Bullingdon Club.

Mount pursued postgraduate studies in Architectural History at the Courtauld Institute, receiving an additional MA degree; he then qualified as a barrister, but failed to secure a tenancy in chambers following his pupillage. He also briefly worked as a banker.

== Career ==
Harry Mount is editor of The Oldie, a British monthly magazine founded in 1992 by Richard Ingrams. Ingrams was succeeded in 2014 by Alexander Chancellor, and Mount took over after Chancellor's death in 2017.

Mount has worked as a leader writer and a New York correspondent for The Daily Telegraph. He previously had a regular column at the same paper.

Mount has written extensively for The Spectator since 2002, and for the Evening Standard since 2012.

In 2022, Mount was appointed an Independent Member of the House of Lords Appointments Commission during Boris Johnson's final days in office. The appointment was criticised by Labour's deputy leader Angela Rayner, who called it "a display of pure arrogance by Boris Johnson, putting his own leading crony in charge of stopping cronyism in parliament". Mount was appointed to serve from 11 September 2022. He resigned from the commission later that month.

== Controversy ==
As a member of the Bullingdon Club at Oxford, Mount enjoyed a certain notoriety after being rolled down a hill in a portable toilet. "It was like coming out of Dracula's coffin", he told The New Yorker in 2007.

After Mount wrote in The Spectator (2004) lamenting the supposed demise of Classics teaching in the UK, and dismissing the Cambridge Latin Course, The Spectator published a riposte from the Dean of Wadham, James Morwood, saying: "His denunciation of the Cambridge Latin Course as 'the evil Latin-for-idiots school textbooks' is blind to the fact that it was this very course which rescued Latin from an apparently terminal decline in the 1960s."

Also in 2004, he attracted some mild comment for refusing to review David Mitchell's widely acclaimed Cloud Atlas for The Sunday Telegraph because he could not finish it, finding it "unreadable".

The Classical theme recurred in 2007 with the publication of Mount's best-seller, Amo, Amas, Amat ... and All That. Although this book repeated his ridicule of the education system, it was his exposure of the elitist implications of the study of Latin which “caused a measure of class controversy in the U.K."

"Class war with classicists" was the headline in Spectator Australia after Mount wrote a Telegraph article in 2015 saying classics exams had been dumbed down. Mount detailed the abuse he received, including: "A classics student at King’s College London called me an 'antediluvian ape'. A classics teacher at Durham Sixth Form Centre predicted my next book would be 'bowel-achingly derivative'." Mount fought back with: "The classics trolls instantly associate any dumbing down suggestions with far-right fogeyish snobbishness."

== Personal life ==
Mount lives in north London.

== Works ==
Mount is the author of several books:

- My Brief Career, an account of his pupillage at a barristers' chambers.
- Amo, Amas, Amat ... and All That, published by Hyperion in 2007, was a best-selling popular reference on the Latin language whose title harks back to Sellar and Yeatman's 1066 and All That. Dedicated to his brother (William) and sister (Mary), the book introduced the basics of Latin grammar and combined his own personal memories, Latin references in popular culture, and stories about ancient Rome. In it, he reveals his prep school nickname of "Mons" (Mons, montis m. mountain). Published in the United States as Carpe Diem: Put a Little Latin in Your Life.
- A Lust for Window Sills, a popular guide to British architecture.
- How England Made the English – from Hedgerows to Heathrow, a book about the English character and landscape. Published in May 2012 by Viking.
- Harry's Mount's Odyssey: Ancient Greece in the Footsteps of Odysseus Published by Bloomsbury in 2015.
- The King and I: How Elvis Shaped My Life (Kindle Single, 2017)
- Summer Madness: How Brexit Split the Tories, Destroyed Labour and Divided the Country (Biteback, 2017)
- Et Tu, Brute? The Best Latin Lines Ever (Bloomsbury, 2022), with John Davie
- The Last Marchioness: A Portrait of Lindy Dufferin (Venn, 2023), edited and introduced by Mount.

In June 2013, Bloomsbury published The Wit and Wisdom of Boris Johnson, edited and introduced by Mount.

Mount also edited a collection of Auberon Waugh's journalism entitled Closing the Circle.

== See also ==
- Mount baronets
