= Kathryn Dugdale =

Lady-in-Waiting 1995–2002

Dame Kathryn Dugdale DCVO

Lady in waiting

Woman of the Bedchamber
- In office 1955–2002

Personal details
- Born: 4 November 1923 London, England
- Died: 12 March 2004 (aged 80) London, England
- Spouse: Sir John Dugdale
- Parents: Oliver Stanley (father); Maureen Stanley (mother)

Military service
- Allegiance: United Kingdom
- Branch/service: Women's Royal Naval Service
- Years of service: 2 years
- Rank: Wren

Dame Kathryn Edith Helen Dugdale (née Stanley; 4 November 1923 – 12 March 2004) was one of Queen Elizabeth ll's ladies-in-waiting, serving from 1955 to 2002.

== Life and family ==
She was born on 4 November 1923 to British politician Oliver Stanley and Lady Maureen Vane-Tempest-Stuart. Her father was the second son of Edward Stanley, 17th Earl of Derby and her mother was the only daughter of Charles Vane-Tempest-Stewart, 7th Marquess of Londonderry.

She was raised in the Lake District. During World War II she served in the Women's Royal Naval Service.

In 1956 she married John Robert Stratford Dugdale, who was appointed Lord Lieutenant of Shropshire in 1975. He was also chairman of Telford Development Corporation. They had four children. She lived in Shropshire at Tickwood Hall, a 200 acre estate near Much Wenlock.

Dugdale served as a magistrate for 25 years from 1964. She was president of Shropshire Community Council, and served with the National Society for the Prevention of Cruelty to Children, the League of Pity, and the Girl Guides. She was Deputy Lieutenant of Shropshire. She was appointed Commander of the Royal Victorian Order in 1973 and Dame Commander in 1984.

In 1991, her son Harry married Adi Litia Mara, the daughter of the former president and prime minister of Fiji Ratu Kamisese Mara. John Dugdale died in 1994. The Daily Telegraph said she was stoical in widowhood, saying "crying is for housemaids."

Dugdale died on 12 March 2004.

Former British Prime Minister David Cameron, was a nephew of her brother-in-law Sir William Dugdale.

== Lady-in-waiting ==
Dugdale knew the future Queen Elizabeth II from childhood, as her father, a cabinet minister, was a close friend of the Queen's father, King George VI.

Dugdale was one of Queen Elizabeth's longest serving ladies-in-waiting. She was appointed Woman of the Bedchamber in 1955 and retired in 2002. She travelled the world attending the Queen, including visits to Tuvalu, Russia, Canada, the Vatican and China. She twice accompanied the Queen to Fiji, in 1977 and 1982, and met the chiefly Mara family, that her son would later marry into.

As a Woman of the Bedchamber, she attended the Queen for a fortnight, three or four times a year.

On 13 October 1972, on a visit to Stirling, Scotland, several hundred drunken students demonstrated and "mobbed, insulted and nearly injured the Queen of England". Dugdale "grabbed a youth by his shoulder-length hair and flung him aside." The six-feet tall Dugdale later said "I must admit it was pretty rough for a while, but still, I had the height to deal with him."

The Birmingham Post quoted her as saying "the first thing the Queen does after returning from a hectic day is to flop into an armchair and kick off her shoes." Dugdale said her role "means just being there when I am needed... It is nice for the Queen to have another woman with her." She added, "England has always been very fortunate with its Queens."
