= Joshua Dugdale =

British filmmaker (born 1974)

- Born: Thomas Joshua Stratford Dugdale; 20 September 1974 (age 52); Blyth Hall, Warwickshire, UK
- Occupations: Film director and estate manager
- Years active: 2000–present
- Spouse: Diana Redvers

Thomas Joshua Stratford Dugdale FRSA (born 20 September 1974) is a British farmer, estate owner and documentary film-maker.

== Education and personal life ==
He attended Eton College, studied economics at the University of Manchester, and law at City, University of London. He has two children, Lily and Salvador, with author Sasha Norris, and two further children, Ferdinand and Francis, with Diana Redvers, who he married in 2009. In 2016 he signed an open letter to the Times against Brexit on behalf of British business leaders, and in 2018 he became patron of the West Berkshire Mencap.

== Career ==
=== Documentary film ===
His 2002 film for the BBC, LAPD Blues looked at the tenure of LAPD Chief Bernard Parkes on the ten year anniversary of the LA Riots following the beating of Rodney King in 1992. Dugdale was based at the South Central Police Station where the BBC team witnessed a marked increase in the murder rate and a disillusioned police force following policies brought in by Parkes. Following the film, the Police Commission refused to reappoint Parkes after a very political campaign fought in the media spotlight about the direction in which he was taking the LAPD. Parkes, an African-American, was another victim in the racial divides that characterise policing in Los Angeles, and many American cities. The documentary won the highest ratings of that year for a BBC current affairs documentary.

In 2005–2008 he made a three-year biopic of the fourteenth Dalai Lama Tenzin Gyatso, The Unwinking Gaze. In this film he recorded the Dalai Lama as a leader of the Tibetan people, rather than portraying him as spiritual leader in Tibetan Buddhism as is done customarily. In the film the Dalai Lama is seen to anoint his spiritual successors in His Holiness the Karmapa, Ogyen Trinley Dorje and Ling Rinpoche for the first time. The film had unprecedented access in following the work of Lodi Gyari, the Dalai Lama's special envoy. The documentary was awarded Mammoth Best Documentary in 2008 as well as the runner up in the Best Documentary section for the Foreign Press Association in 2008. The Guardian suggested that it could force China into a more civil and humanitarian stance towards Tibet.

=== Wasing Estate ===
Dugdale took over management of the Wasing estate in Berkshire (which includes Wasing Place and Wasing Park) from his grandparents in 2008. Its manor is centred on a manor house which was purchased in 1759 by the London nautical publisher John Mount, a maternal ancestor of Dugdale's. Mount was the third generation of the publishing firm Mount and Page who dominated the nautical publishing scene in the first half of the eighteenth century. They published the English Pilot, the first English pilot to cover the known world. John Mount built the mansion Wasing Place, completed in 1770, which became the home of his descendants the MPs, William Mount, William George Mount and Sir William Mount. The house was rebuilt after a fire in 1945.

Under Dugdale Wasing Park hosted Glade Festival after its transfer from a stage at Glastonbury Festival.

In 2015 he concluded a £3 million restoration project, and opened the estate up to alternative events.

In 2016 the annual Mizuno Endure 24 race held on the estate was disrupted when hundreds of runners reported a "mystery illness" which they had contracted on site.

In 2018 Dugdale submitted plans to build further visitor facilities and a farm shop at the Wasing estate, claiming 30 jobs would be created.

On the death of Dugdale's mother, Lady Cecilia Dugdale, in 2019 Dugdale inherited the estate in full after many years of managing and farming it. He is the 7th generation of his maternal family (the Mount baronets) to do so.

=== Other work ===
Dugdale supports the legalisation of psilocybin mushrooms and works with the Psilocybin Access Rights (PAR) group. He has highlighted psilocybin's ability to tackle depression, anorexia and trauma.

During the pandemic, Dugdale helped galvanise the wedding industry in their response to the shut down of weddings and events, lobbying with various departments and the Cabinet Office within government to find a home for the wedding sector. Dugdale interviewed Paul Scully MP and Kwasi Kwarteng MP on behalf of the wedding industry helping obtain concrete steps for the re-opening of the sector.

In 2020 Dugdale initiated Medicine Festival bringing together a group of co-founders to establish Medicine Festivall on the estate. The festival celebrates indigenous rights and culture from all over the world and combines world music with talks and workshops. In 2020 it was the only festival that was allowed to happen during the pandemic due to strong lobbying within government.

Dugdale has been working on the campaign for Psilocybin Access Rights with the launch of their campaign at 2023 Medicine Festival.

Dugdale has also been working on a decarbonisation strategy as part of the Urge Collective, assisting the Broadway Initiative to develop a campaign for SMEs in the UK. Recently he has successfully lobbied for an extension in the hemp growing license for UK farmers. The government announced the extension to six years on 9 April 2024.

=== The Mount ===
In 2023 he opened The Mount, a new amphitheatre at Wasing. The first year opened on the Solstice with Australian artist Xavier Rudd, Fred Leone, Sam Lee, Chief Nixiwaka and members of The Yawanawa, Nessi Gomes, and Danit. This followed with a series featuring Jack Johnson, Sigur Ros, Gabriels, Primal Scream and Ben Howard.

Jack Johnson described the venue as "like looking at a Van Gogh". Rolling Stone Magazine described the venue at "The lushest of gig settings".

2024 artists lined up are Jungle, Crowded House, Underworld, Paulo Nutini, and Nick Mulvey and Rodrigo and Gabriella for Solstice.

== Family ==
Dugdale is the son of former Aston Villa chairman Sir William Dugdale, 2nd Baronet of Blyth Hall, a descendant of the Noble House of Stratford, and his wife, Cecilia (Cylla) Mary, daughter of Sir William Mount, 2nd Baronet of Wasing Place in Berkshire. Dugdale is also a cousin of former Conservative Party leader and Prime Minister of the United Kingdom, David Cameron.

== Filmography ==
Film	Year	Remark
Pepe and his Cuban Heels	1996	On life in Cuba
LAPD Blues	2002	Reporter
The Unwinking Gaze	2008	Director/producer; biography of Tenzin Gyatso
