= Brimpton Airfield =

Civilian airfield in Berkshire

Brimpton (Wasing Lower Farm) Airfield
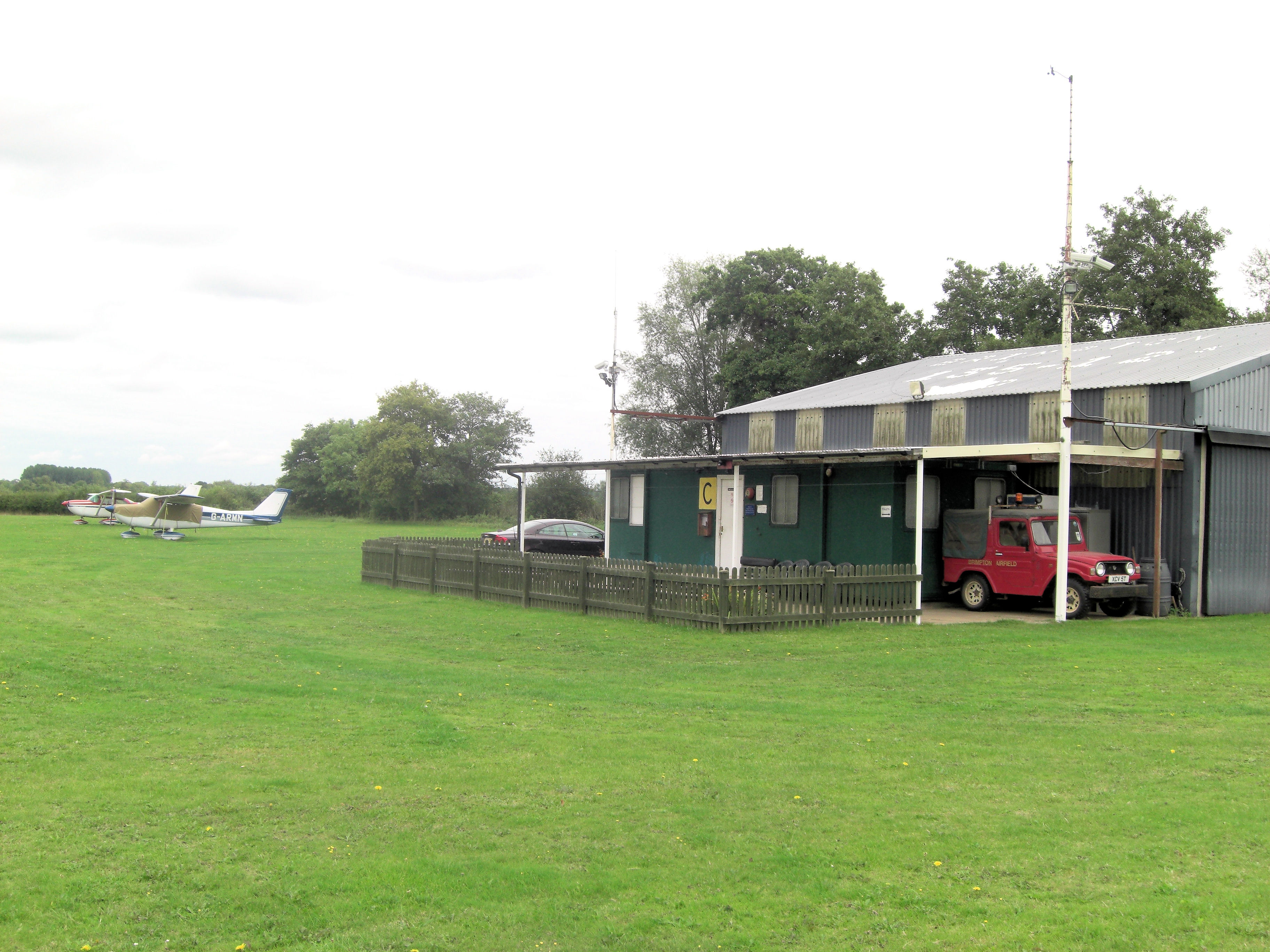
- Brimpton Airfield Clubhouse
- IATA: none; ICAO: EGLP

Summary
- Airport type: Private
- Owner: Brimpton Airfield Ltd
- Location: Wasing
- Elevation AMSL: 210 ft (64 m)
- Coordinates: 51°23′00.5″N 001°10′19.6″W
- Website: www.brimpton-airfield.co.uk

Map
- Location in Berkshire

Runways
Direction	Length		Surface
Direction	m	ft	Surface
06/24	620	2,034	Grass

Brimpton (Wasing Lower Farm) Airfield is an unlicensed single-runway civilian airfield in the south-east of West Berkshire, United Kingdom.

== History ==
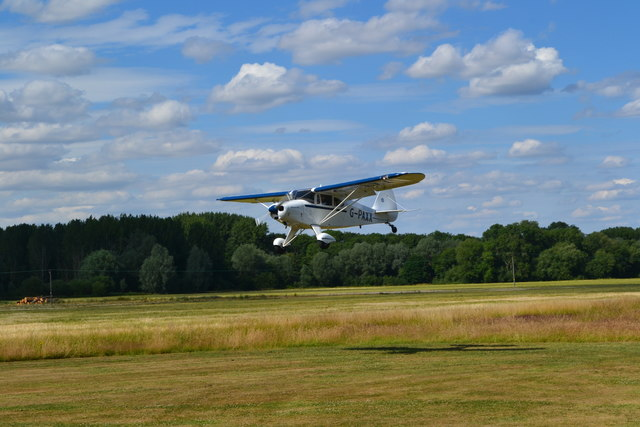
Light aircraft coming in to land at Brimpton Airfield

Close to RAF Greenham Common, the airfield was founded in the 1950s by Sir William Mount, a director at Miles Aircraft in Woodley, Berkshire. In the 1970s, the airfield was used by crop spraying contractors for local agriculture until 1979 when it was designated for public civilian use.

== Location ==
Brimpton Airfield located 5.5 nautical miles (10.2 km; 6.3 mi) east of Newbury, Berkshire, at 210 feet (64 m) AMSL. It is in close proximity to the Atomic Weapons Establishment in nearby Aldermaston; an R101(2.4) restriction is in place for the surrounding airspace, requiring all circuits to be completed to the north of the runway. Within the R101 catchment, the airfield has special exemption from the Civil Aviation Authority of the United Kingdom (CAA).

The single grass runway (06/24) is 620 metres (2,030 ft) long and 25 metres (82 ft) wide, and has a 50-metre (160 ft) extension at its eastern end.

== Incidents ==
On 14 February 2009 a pilot sustained injury in crashing their microlight within the airfield's perimeter. On 5 June 2016 a Tiger Moth crashed on takeoff and collided with two parked cars; a person on the ground was injured.

== In popular culture ==
Brimpton Airfield was used as the setting for Upshott Flying Club in the 2022 Slow Horses episode "From Upshott with Love".
