= The Art of the Sale =

The Art of the Sale Learning From The Masters About The Business Of Life
- First edition
- Author: Philip Delves Broughton
- Language: English
- Subject: Business
- Genre: non-fiction, Business & economy
- Publisher: Penguin Press
- Publication date: 2012
- Publication place: United States
- Media type: Print (hardcover) Audiobook
- Pages: 291
- ISBN: 9781461844525

The Art of the Sale - Learning From The Masters About The Business Of Life is a non-fiction book by the author and journalist Philip Delves Broughton. He also authored the bestseller Ahead of the Curve.

The book was published by Penguin Press in 2012. It analyses the role of persuasion in everyday life and the qualities of effective salespeople. The author had international travels to learn the art and science of selling. The book deals with the importance and the cultural influence of sales and role of sales as social discourse, as the means to generate revenue. BBC Radio in Peter Day's World of Business interviewed the author of the book.

== Summary ==
The subject of selling things isn't covered in most MBA programs of Harvard Business School.
