= Sir William Dugdale, 2nd Baronet =

Sir William Dugdale Bt CBE MC DL

Chairman of Aston Villa F.C.
- In office 1975–1978
- Preceded by: Doug Ellis
- Succeeded by: Harry Kartz

Personal details
- Born: William Stratford Dugdale; 29 March 1922 Shustoke, Warwickshire, England
- Died: 13 November 2014 (aged 92) Atherstone, Warwickshire, England
- Spouses: Belinda Pleydell-Bouverie (m. 1952; d. 1961) Cecilia Mount (m. 1967; d. 2014)
- Children: 6
- Education: Balliol College, Oxford
- Awards: Military Cross

Military service
- Allegiance: United Kingdom
- Branch/service: British Army
- Years of service: 1942–1945
- Rank: Captain
- Unit: Grenadier Guards
- Battles/wars: World War II

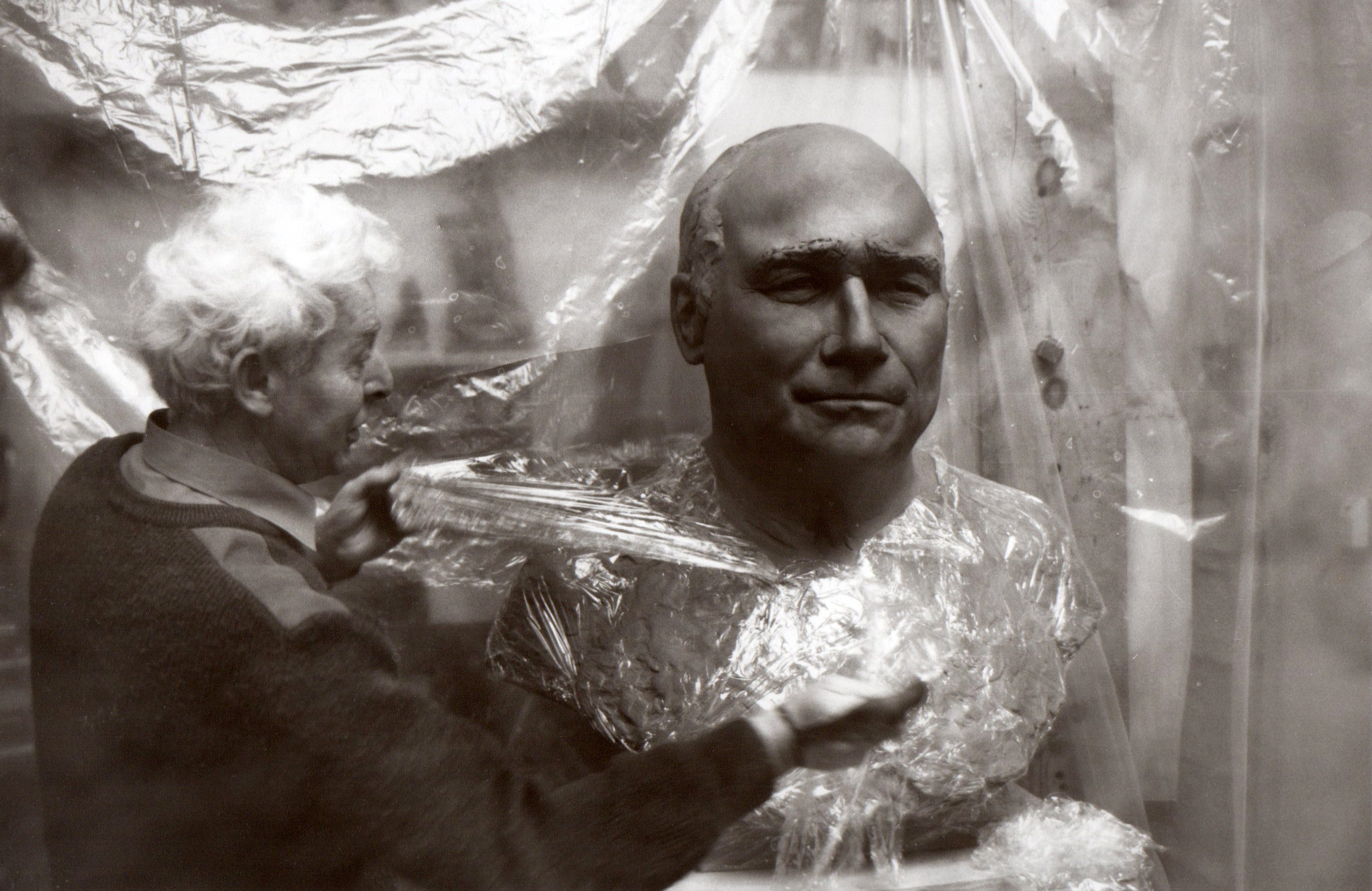
Sir William Dugdale - a clay maquette of him by the sculptor Denis Alva Parsons

Sir William Stratford Dugdale, 2nd Baronet, CBE, MC, DL, JP (29 March 1922 – 13 November 2014) was the chairman of Aston Villa from 1975 to 1978. Dugdale arrived at Aston Villa as a director when they were in the third division, having been relegated due to poor performances on and off the pitch. He left the club in 1982, the year they won the European Cup. Following several successful years as a director in the early-1970s, he was elected chairman in 1975, taking over the position from Doug Ellis, the package holiday businessman, before being replaced by Harry Kartz.

== Biography ==
Dugdale was born on 29 March 1922, the son of Sir William Francis Stratford Dugdale, 1st Bt of the Noble House of Stratford, and Margaret Gilmour. Educated at Eton College and Balliol College, Oxford, he succeeded to the title of 2nd Baronet Dugdale, of Merevale and Blyth, co. Warwick [UK, 1936] on 18 April 1965.

He fought in the Second World War, where he was mentioned in despatches, gaining the rank of captain in the service of the Grenadier Guards, having been commissioned into that regiment on 27 September 1941 and after serving in the ranks in the Royal Berkshire Regiment. His service number was 207638. He was decorated with the award of the Military Cross (M.C.) in 1943 for outstanding bravery whilst under fire. He fought at Anzio, and ended the war guarding the German generals at Nuremberg.

He was a practising solicitor in 1949. He held the office of Justice of the Peace (J.P.) for Warwickshire in 1951 and office of Deputy Lieutenant (D.L.) of Warwickshire in 1955. He held the office of High Sheriff of Warwickshire for 1971. He held the office of Sheriff of Stratford-upon-Avon in 1976. He was invested as a Commander, Order of the British Empire (C.B.E.) in 1985.

He also enjoyed success in racing, riding in the Grand National in 1953 and then becoming the Chief Disciplinary steward in the Jockey Club, the organisation that ran the Racing industry.

He was chairman of General Utilities plc between 1988 and 1999 and was made head of the National Water Council in 1983, helping then Prime Minister Margaret Thatcher with the unions in the water industry. He lived in 2003 at Merevale Hall, Atherstone, Warwickshire and at 24 Bryanston Mews West, London.

== Family ==
He married, firstly, Lady Belinda Pleydell-Bouverie, daughter of William Pleydell-Bouverie, 7th Earl of Radnor and Helena Olivia Adeane, on 13 December 1952. Lady Belinda died of cancer in 1961. He married, secondly, Cecilia (Cylla) Mary Mount, daughter of Sir William Mount, 2nd Baronet and Elizabeth Nance Llewellyn, on 17 October 1967.

Children of Sir William Dugdale, Bt and Lady Belinda Pleydell-Bouverie:

- Laura Dugdale b. 20 September 1953
- Matilda Dugdale b. 15 May 1955
- Charlotte Dugdale b. 15 May 1955
- William Matthew Stratford Dugdale, 3rd Baronet b. 22 February 1959

Children of Sir William Dugdale, Bt and Cecilia Mary Mount:

- Adelaide Margaret Victoria Jane Dugdale b. 9 July 1970
- Thomas Joshua Stratford Dugdale b. 20 September 1974

Dugdale's niece, Elizabeth Dugdale, daughter of his brother Sir John Dugdale, is a god-daughter of Queen Elizabeth II.

The former Conservative Party leader and Prime Minister of the United Kingdom, David Cameron, is the nephew by marriage of Sir William Dugdale.

== Citations ==
- [S8] Charles Mosley, editor, Burke's Peerage and Baronetage, 106th edition, 2 volumes (Crans, Switzerland: Burke's Peerage (Genealogical Books) Ltd, 1999), volume 1, page 888. Hereinafter cited as Burke's Peerage and Baronetage, 106th edition.
- [S300] Michael Rhodes, "re: Ernest Fawbert Collection," e-mail message to Darryl Roger Lundy, 8 February. Hereinafter cited as "re: Ernest Fawbert Collection."
- [S37] Charles Mosley, editor, Burke's Peerage, Baronetage & Knightage, 107th edition, 3 volumes (Wilmington, Delaware, USA: Burke's Peerage (Genealogical Books) Ltd, 2003). Hereinafter cited as Burke's Peerage and Baronetage, 107th edition.
- [S37] Charles Mosley, Burke's Peerage and Baronetage, 107th edition, volume 1, page 1198.
- [S8] Charles Mosley, Burke's Peerage and Baronetage, 106th edition, volume 1, page 889.

Baronetage of the United Kingdom
Preceded by William Dugdale	Baronet (of Merevale and Blyth); 1965–2014	Succeeded by William Dugdale
