= Adrian Mitchell =

English poet, novelist, and playwright (1932–2008)

Adrian Mitchell FRSL
- Born: 24 October 1932; London, England
- Died: 20 December 2008 (aged 76); London, England
- Education: Dauntsey's School; Christ Church, Oxford
- Occupations: Poet, novelist, playwright, cultural activist
- Spouses: Maureen Bush; Celia Hewitt
- Writing career
- Language: English
- Genres: Poetry, novels, plays
- Notable work: "To Whom It May Concern"
- Notable awards: Eric Gregory Award; PEN Translation Prize

Adrian Mitchell (24 October 1932 – 20 December 2008) was an English poet, novelist, and playwright. A former journalist, he became a noted figure on the British left. For almost half a century he was the foremost poet of the country's Campaign for Nuclear Disarmament movement. His best-known poem, "To Whom It May Concern", was his bitterly sarcastic reaction to the televised horrors of the Vietnam War. Mitchell's poems ranged from anarchistic anti-war satire, through love poetry, to stories and poems for children. He also wrote librettos. In 2002, he was nominated, semi-seriously, as Britain's "Shadow Poet Laureate".

== Early life and education ==
Adrian Mitchell was born on 24 October 1932 near Hampstead Heath, north London. His mother, Kathleen Fabian, was a Fröbel-trained nursery school teacher and his father, Jock Mitchell, a research chemist from Cupar in Fife. Adrian was educated at the Junior School of Monkton Combe School in Bath. He then went to Greenways School, at Ashton Gifford House in Wiltshire, run at the time by a friend of his mother. This, said Mitchell, was "a school in Heaven, where my first play, The Animals' Brains Trust, was staged when I was nine to my great satisfaction."

His schooling was completed as a boarder at Dauntsey's School, where he collaborated in plays with friend Gordon Snell. Mitchell did his National Service in the RAF. He commented that this "confirmed (his) natural pacificism".

He went on to study English at Christ Church, Oxford, where he was taught by J. R. R. Tolkien's son. Mitchell became chairman of the university's poetry society and the literary editor of Isis magazine.

== Career ==
On graduating, he got a job as a reporter on the Oxford Mail and, later, at the Evening Standard in London. He later wrote of this period:

Inheriting enough money to live on for a year, I wrote my first novel and my first TV play. Soon afterwards I became a freelance journalist, writing about pop music for the Daily Mail and TV for the pre-tabloid Sun and the Sunday Times. I quit journalism in the mid-Sixties and since then have been a free-falling poet, playwright and writer of stories.

Ever inspired by the example of his own favourite poet and precursor William Blake, about whom he wrote the acclaimed Tyger for the National Theatre, Mitchell's often angry output swirled from anarchistic anti-war satire, through love poetry to, increasingly, stories and poems for children. He also wrote librettos. The Poetry Archive identified his creative yield as hugely prolific. He sought in his work to counteract the implications of his own assertion, that "Most people ignore most poetry because most poetry ignores most people."

Mitchell gave frequent public readings, particularly for left-wing causes. Satire was his speciality. Commissioned to write a poem about Prince Charles and his special relationship (as Prince of Wales) with the people of Wales, his measured response was short and to the point: "Royalty is a neurosis. Get well soon."

Heart on the Left: Ralph Steadman's blood-splattered cover for Mitchell's Poems 1953–1984

In "Loose Leaf Poem", from Ride the Nightmare, Mitchell wrote:

My brain socialist
My heart anarchist
My eyes pacifist
My blood revolutionary

He was in the habit of stipulating in any preface to his collections: "None of the work in this book is to be used in connection with any examination whatsoever." His best-known poem, "To Whom It May Concern", was his bitterly sarcastic reaction to the televised horrors of the Vietnam War. The poem begins:

I was run over by the truth one day.
Ever since the accident I’ve walked this way
So stick my legs in plaster
Tell me lies about Vietnam

He first read it to thousands of nuclear disarmament protesters who, having marched through central London on CND's first new format one-day Easter March, finally crammed into Trafalgar Square on the afternoon of Easter Day 1964. As Mitchell delivered his lines from the pavement in front of the National Gallery, angry demonstrators in the square below scuffled with police. Over the years, he updated the poem to take into account recent events.

In 1972, he confronted then-prime minister Edward Heath about germ warfare and the war in Northern Ireland.

His poem "Victor Jara" was set to music by Arlo Guthrie and included on his 1976 album Amigo.

Mitchell was later responsible for the well-respected musical stage adaptation of The Lion, the Witch and the Wardrobe, a production commissioned and performed by the Royal Shakespeare Company that premiered in November 1998 at the Royal Shakespeare Theatre in Stratford-upon-Avon, and transferring to the Barbican Theatre in London.

His work for the Royal Shakespeare Company included Peter Brook's US and the English version of Peter Weiss's Marat/Sade.

Ever inspired by the example of his own favourite poet and precursor William Blake, about whom he wrote the acclaimed Tyger for the National Theatre, Mitchell's often angry output swirled from anarchistic anti-war satire, through love poetry to, increasingly, stories and poems for children. He also wrote librettos. The Poetry Archive identified his creative yield as hugely prolific.

After his death, in 2009 Frances Lincoln Children's Books published an adaptation of Ovid: Shapeshifters: tales from Ovid's Metamorphoses, written by Mitchell and illustrated by Alan Lee.

== Other activities ==
Mitchell was for some years poetry editor of the New Statesman, and was the first to publish an interview with the Beatles.

One Remembrance Sunday, Mitchell laid the Peace Pledge Union's White Poppy wreath on the Cenotaph in Whitehall.

On one International Conscientious Objectors' Day, Mitchell read a poem at the ceremony at the Conscientious Objectors Commemorative Stone in Tavistock Square, London.

== Death and legacy ==
Mitchell died on 20 December 2008 at the age of 76 in a North London hospital, following a suspected heart attack. For two months, he had been suffering from pneumonia. Two days earlier he had completed what turned out to be his last poem, "My Literary Career So Far".

== Recognition and awards ==
In the late 1960s, British poets at a conference voted for Adrian Mitchell as the next poet laureate. Around 30 years later, he was nominated, semi-seriously, as Britain's "Shadow Poet Laureate" by Red Pepper magazine.

In a National Poetry Day poll in 2005, Mitchell's poem "Human Beings" was voted the one most people would like to see launched into space.

=== Awards ===
Mitchell won several awards, including:

- 1961: Eric Gregory Award
- 1966: PEN Translation Prize
- 1971: Tokyo Festival Television Film Award
- 2005: CLPE Poetry Award (shortlist) for Daft as a Doughnut

=== Appraisal and tributes ===
Fellow writers could be effusive in their tributes. John Berger said: "Against the present British state he opposes a kind of revolutionary populism, bawdiness, wit and the tenderness sometimes to be found between animals." Angela Carter once wrote that Mitchell was "a joyous, acrid and demotic tumbling lyricist Pied Piper, determinedly singing us away from catastrophe." Ted Hughes stated: "In the world of verse for children, nobody has produced more surprising verse or more genuinely inspired fun than Adrian Mitchell."

According to writer Jan Woolf, "He never let up. Most calls—'Can you do this one, Adrian?'—were answered, 'Sure, I'll be there.' His reading of 'Tell Me Lies' at a City Hall benefit just before the 2003 invasion of Iraq was electrifying. Of course, he couldn't stop that war, but he performed as if he could."

"Adrian", said fellow poet Michael Rosen, "was a socialist and a pacifist who believed, like William Blake, that everything human was holy. That's to say he celebrated a love of life with the same fervour that he attacked those who crushed life. He did this through his poetry, his plays, his song lyrics and his own performances. Through this huge body of work, he was able to raise the spirits of his audiences, in turn exciting, inspiring, saddening and enthusing them.... He has sung, chanted, whispered and shouted his poems in every kind of place imaginable, urging us to love our lives, love our minds and bodies and to fight against tyranny, oppression and exploitation."

The critic Kenneth Tynan called him "the British Mayakovsky".

The Times said that Mitchell's had been a "forthright voice often laced with tenderness". His poems on such topics as nuclear war, Vietnam, prisons and racism had become "part of the folklore of the Left. His work was often read and sung at demonstrations and rallies".

== Personal life ==
Mitchell first married Maureen Bush, with whom he had two sons and a daughter. Alistair (a lawyer, died 2019 aged 61), Danny and Briony. They adopted Boty Goodwin (1966–1995), daughter of the artist Pauline Boty, following the death of her father, literary agent Clive Goodwin, in 1978. Following Boty Goodwin's death from a heroin overdose, Mitchell wrote the poem "Especially when it snows" in her memory.

He was survived by his second wife, actress Celia Hewitt, who owned a Highgate bookshop, Ripping Yarns, and their two daughters Sasha and Beattie.

== Selected bibliography ==
- If You See Me Comin', novel (Jonathan Cape, 1962)
- Poems (Jonathan Cape, 1964; 978-0224608732)
- Out Loud (Cape Goliard, 1968)
- Ride the Nightmare (Cape, 1971; ISBN 978-0224005630)
- Tyger: A Celebration Based on the Life and Works of William Blake (Cape, 1971; ISBN 978-0224006521)
- The Apeman Cometh (Cape, 1975; ISBN 978-0224011471)
- Man Friday, novel (Futura, 1975; ISBN 978-0860072744)
- For Beauty Douglas: Collected Poems 1953–79, illus. Ralph Steadman (Allison & Busby, 1981; ISBN 978-0850313994)
- On the Beach at Cambridge: New Poems (Allison and Busby, 1984; ISBN 978-0850315639)
- Nothingmas Day, illus. John Lawrence (Allison & Busby, 1984; ISBN 978-0850315325)
- Love Songs of World War Three: Collected Stage Lyrics (Allison and Busby, 1988; ISBN 978-0850319910)
- All My Own Stuff, illus. Frances Lloyd (Simon & Schuster, 1991; ISBN 978-0750004466)
- Adrian Mitchell's Greatest Hits – The Top Forty, illus. Ralph Steadman (Bloodaxe Books, 1991; ISBN 978-1852241643)
- Blue Coffee: Poems 1985–1996 (Bloodaxe, 1996; 1997 reprint, ISBN 978-1852243623)
- Heart on the Left: Poems 1953–1984 (Bloodaxe, 1997; ISBN 978-1852244255)
- Balloon Lagoon and Other Magic Islands of Poetry, illus. Tony Ross (Orchard Books, 1997; ISBN 978-1860396595)
- The Lion, the Witch and the Wardrobe, dramatisation of C.S Lewis's novel (Oberon Modern Plays; 1998 ISBN 978-1-84002-049-6
- Nobody Rides the Unicorn, illus. Stephen Lambert (Corgi Children's, new edn 2000; ISBN 978-0552546171)
- All Shook Up: Poems 1997–2000 (Bloodaxe, 2000; ISBN 978-1852245139)
- Alice in Wonderland and Through the Looking-Glass, dramatisation of Lewis Carroll's novels (Oberon Modern Plays, 2001; ISBN 978-1-84002-256-8)
- The Shadow Knows: Poems 2001–2004 (Bloodaxe, 2004)
- Tell Me Lies: Poems 2005–2008, illus. Ralph Steadman (Bloodaxe, 2009; ISBN 978-1852248437)
- Umpteen Pockets, illus. Tony Ross (Orchard Books, 2009; ISBN 978-1408303634)
- Daft as a Doughnut (Orchard Books, 2009; ISBN 978-1408308073)
- Shapeshifters: Tales from Ovid's Metamorphoses, illus. Alan Lee (Frances Lincoln, 2009; ISBN 978-1845075361)
- Come on Everybody: Poems 1953–2008 (Bloodaxe, 2012; ISBN 978-1852249465)
- Just Adrian (United Kingdom: Oberon Books, 2012. ISBN 978-1849430470)
