= Foreign Bondholders Protective Council =

- Type: Non-profit company
- Industry: Debt recovery
- Founded: 1933; 93 years ago in Washington, DC
- Founder: President Franklin D. Roosevelt
- Headquarters: Washington, DC, United States
- Products: Debt recovery negotiations

Foreign Bondholders Protective Council was an American government sponsored organization to assist US citizens and creditors in collecting on defaulted foreign government bonds. It operated from 1933 into the early 2000s. It was structured as a private, non-profit organisation and negotiated on behalf of creditors with foreign governments with support of the United States Department of State.

== History ==
In 1933, under Title II of the Securities Act of 1933, and at the request of the United States Department of State, President Franklin D. Roosevelt, by Executive Order, created the Foreign Bondholders Protective Council to assist US creditors in collecting on defaulted foreign government bonds.

Raymond B. Stevens was the council's first president. Prior to formation of the private, non-profit FBPC, no permanent organization existed to negotiate settlements with defaulting debtors. The council was particularly active before World War II, then again in the 1970s and 1980s. As recently as 2002, both the Department of State and the Securities and Exchange Commission recommended that creditors who hold more than 18,000 Chinese government bonds issued between 1913 and 1942 seek the FBPC's assistance in negotiating fair settlements. The FBPC works similarly to the UK's Corporation of Foreign Bondholders.

== See also ==
- Bond vigilante
- Corporation of Foreign Bondholders
- Foreign Claims Settlement Commission
- Sovereign default
- Debt crisis
