= Mount baronets =

Baronetcy in the Baronetage of the United Kingdom

Mount Baronets, of Wasing
- Blazon: Arms: Or on a mount vert a lion rampant azure, ducally crowned or, between in chief two roses gules, barbed and seeded proper; Crest: Upon a mount vert a fox salient proper, supporting a ragged staff erect sable.; Motto: Prudenter et Constanter ("Prudently and Constantly")
- Creation date: 21 June 1921

The Mount baronets are a family with a baronetcy in the United Kingdom.

The baronetcy was settled on William Mount on 21 June 1921 and is extant.

Wasing, Berkshire, is the family seat.

== Mount Baronets, of Wasing (1921) ==
- Sir William Arthur Mount, 1st Baronet (1866–1930)
- Sir William Malcolm Mount, 2nd Baronet TD DL (28 December 1904–22 June 1993)
  - Robert Francis Mount (1907–1969), second son of the 1st Baronet and father of the 3rd Baronet
- Sir William Robert Ferdinand Mount, 3rd Baronet (born 1939)

The heir apparent to the baronetcy is the 3rd Baronet's eldest son, William Robert Horatio Mount (born 1969).
