= Ewen Cameron (banker) =

Scottish merchant banker (1841-1908)

Sir Ewen Cameron
- Born: 23 June 1841; Inverness-shire, Scotland
- Died: 10 December 1908 (aged 67); Hampstead, England
- Occupations: merchant banker chartered accountant
- Spouse: Josephine Elizabeth
- Children: 5

Sir Ewen Cameron KCMG FRGS (23 June 1841 – 10 December 1908) was a Scottish merchant banker and chartered accountant of the late 19th century, who rose to be chairman of the Hong Kong and Shanghai Banking Corporation in London. He played a key role in arranging loans from the Rothschild family to the Empire of Japan during the Russo-Japanese War.

He is the patrilineal great-great-grandfather of David Cameron.

== Early life and family ==
Cameron was born in Inverness-shire, Scotland, the son of William and Catherine Cameron. His father was a Gaelic-speaking tenant farmer who claimed descent from the Camerons of Erracht. The family farm, Muckovie, lay close to Culloden.

== Career ==
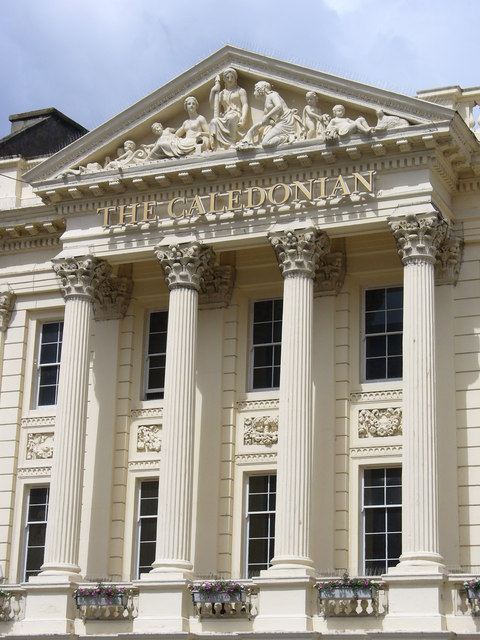
Caledonian Bank, former HQ in Inverness

In 1859, Cameron joined the Caledonian Bank in Aberdeen as an accounting clerk. After qualifying as a chartered accountant he was posted to the Bank of Hindustan, China and Japan before being transferred to Hong Kong in 1866. His abilities, described as "remarkable" by The Times, helped him to land a senior position with the newly formed Hong Kong and Shanghai Bank after the Bank of Hindustan went into liquidation.

Cameron became principal agent to the Calcutta branch of HSBC, following which he acted as manager of its Shanghai branch, where he served until 1890. Cameron's success in reorganizing the bank was rewarded by his appointment as a director before he returned to Britain, where he became chairman of the bank in the City of London.

Cameron was appointed KCMG at the end of 1901 for his "services to overseas banking", and was elected a Fellow of the Royal Geographical Society in February 1902.

During 1904 Cameron and other leading London financiers – including Lord Revelstoke of Baring Bros., Arthur Francis Levita and W. M. Koch of Panmure Gordon (Levita's daughter Enid would later marry Cameron's grandson Ewen Donald Cameron in 1930), Sir Marcus Samuel of Samuel Samuel & Co and Royal Dutch Shell, Sir Carl Meyer, and Otto Kahn – took part in negotiations with the Japanese central banker Takahashi Korekiyo (later Prime Minister of Japan) for the selling of war bonds to finance the Japanese war effort during the Russo-Japanese War.

== Marriage and issue ==
In 1878, Cameron married Josephine Elizabeth (born at Shotford, Norfolk in 1857), daughter of John Houchen of Thetford, Norfolk (Wereham, Norfolk, c. 1818 – Thetford, Norfolk, 6 October 1898), and his wife (m. St James's, Westminster, 29 November 1845) Susannah Vautier (Stanton, Suffolk, c. 1819 – Thetford, Norfolk, 1859), by whom he had five children.

His eldest son, Ewen Allan Cameron, senior partner in Panmure Gordon & Co. and member of the Council of Foreign Bondholders (who died 14 November 1937 in Vienna) was the great-grandfather of David Cameron, Conservative Party Leader (2005–2016) and British Prime Minister (2010–2016).

== Death ==
After suffering bouts of ill health in 1903 and at the end of 1904, Sir Ewen retired in February 1905 and later died at home in Hampstead NW3 on 10 December 1908 at the age of 67.

== Coat of arms ==
Coat of arms of Sir Ewen Cameron
Adopted 1905 Crest A hand grasping a sprig of crowberries proper Escutcheon Gules, three bars or and in chief four bezants Motto Bi Dhichioll Symbolism The arms of Cameron of Lochiel with the addition of four bezants or coins, representing banking

== See also ==
- The Prize: The Epic Quest for Oil, Money, and Power
