= Cylla Dugdale =

British artist and art collector

Lady Cylla Dugdale (née Cecilia Mary Mount; January 15, 1931 – December 4, 2018) was a British artist and art collector.

== Biography ==
Raised in Berkshire's Wasing Place, Cylla was the eldest child of Lieutenant Colonel Sir William Mount, Bt, and Elizabeth Mount (née Llewellyn). Among her notable relatives, she was the aunt of former UK prime minister David Cameron and cousin to writer Sir Ferdinand Mount. Educated at Oakdene and St Andrew's School, Pangbourne, Cylla later studied in Switzerland and pursued an agricultural diploma from Moulton College, Northamptonshire.

Drawn to art, she trained under Carel Weight in London and engaged with the Courtauld Institute of Art. Her experiences spanned traveling on the Queen Mary and across America and working as a liaison officer at Greenham Common airbase in Berkshire.

Cylla's paintings, often reminiscent of Augustus John's style, varied from portraits to landscapes. Besides being an active artist, she was a collector of 20th-century British "kitchen sink" art and frequently supported local artists.

Management of the Wasing Estate passed onto her son Joshua Dugdale in 2008, and he inherited it in full in 2019 after her death.
