= Dugdale baronets =

Baronetcy in the Baronetage of the United Kingdom

There have been two baronetcies created for persons with the surname Dugdale, both in the Baronetage of the United Kingdom.

The Dugdale baronetcy, of Merevale and Blyth in the County of Warwick, was created in the Baronetage of the United Kingdom on 17 July 1936 for William Francis Stratford Dugdale. He was a descendant of the famous antiquary Sir William Dugdale, and a maternal member of the Noble House of Stratford. Richard Geast, maternal nephew of John Dugdale of Blyth, inherited the Dugdale family seat of Blyth Hall and assumed by royal licence the surname of Dugdale in lieu of Geast in 1799. His wife Penelope Bate was the eldest daughter and co-heir of Francis Stratford of Merevale Hall, Warwickshire (from whom the Dugdales descend), which was inherited by their son Dugdale Stratford Dugdale, the great-grandfather of the first baronet.

The present Dugdale baronet is Sir William Matthew Stratford Dugdale, who inherited his father's title in 2014. The family seat is Merevale Hall, Warwickshire.

The Dugdale baronetcy, of Crathorne in the North Riding of the County of York, was created in the Baronetage of the United Kingdom on 31 January 1945 for Thomas Dugdale. For more information on this creation, see the Barons Crathorne.

== Dugdale baronets, of Merevale and Blyth (1936) ==
Escutcheon of the Dugdale baronets of Merevale and Blyth

- Sir William Francis Stratford Dugdale, 1st Baronet (1872–1965)
- Sir William Stratford Dugdale, 2nd Baronet (1922–2014)
- Sir William Matthew Stratford Dugdale, 3rd Baronet (born 1959)

The heir apparent is the present baronet's elder son, William Stratford Dugdale (b. 15 Aug. 1992).

== Dugdale baronets, of Crathorne (1945) ==
- See Baron Crathorne
