= Blairmore Holdings =

Blairmore Holdings, Inc. was an offshore investment company established by Ian Cameron, father of former British Prime Minister, David Cameron. Following the Panama Papers leak, it was discovered that Blairmore Holdings was a customer of Mossack Fonseca, a large Panamanian law firm and corporate service provider at the centre of an international scandal on tax havens, tax avoidance and corruption.

Blairmore Holdings is still in operation and has assets of £35 million.

== History ==
Blairmore Holdings operated as a collective investment fund, in which a range of individuals invest collectively in the stock market and other financial instrument. Blairmore Holdings was established in 1982. The company is named after Blairmore House in Aberdeenshire, the house in which the stockbroker Ian Cameron – father of UK Prime Minister David Cameron – was born.

The company was incorporated in Panama, and based in the Bahamas. According to the Financial Times: "The idea was for investors to avoid an extra layer of tax because investors came from lots of jurisdictions and some, at least, would have faced double taxation if the fund had been based in a mainstream jurisdiction — firstly by the country where the fund operated, and then by the investor's own country when he or she received his profits." The company was created after the abolition of capital controls by Margaret Thatcher in 1979, which allowed UK individuals to invest outside the UK without first obtaining permission from the government.

Ian Cameron ran Blairmore for thirty years alongside five other UK-based directors. The fund retained up to 50 Caribbean officers each year; their job was to sign paperwork and fill roles such as treasurer and secretary, to ensure that the company was not centrally managed and controlled in the UK, and so maintain its tax residence outside the UK. They included the late Solomon Humes, a lay bishop with the non-denominational Church of God of Prophecy. From 2002 until 2007, the fund averaged 116% annual returns, holding blue chip stocks in Apple Inc., Unilever and Coca-Cola.

Like many Panamanian companies, Blairmore issued bearer shares, which are not listed on a share register; rather, like banknotes, they legally belong to the person holding the certificate in their hand. In recent years, bearer shares have been abolished in many countries due to concerns that they could be used by criminals and tax evaders for money laundering and because they conceal the beneficial ownership of the company. However, there is no suggestion that Blairmore was using them for any illegal purpose, and they were common among offshore funds at the time.

Using bearer shares was not always practical. There were "hundreds" of investors, according to minutes of company meetings, and the printed certificates were kept under lock and key in the Bahamas. Documents relate Ian Cameron having to count stacks of certificates to make sure none had been lost or stolen.

UK investors in Blairmore Holdings are subject to the UK offshore funds rules, introduced in 1984, under which all returns are subject to income tax if the fund does not obtain certification a "distributing fund" from the UK tax authorities each year, which entailed distributing most of its income to shareholders. A prospectus issued in March 2006 suggests it has been certified by HM Revenue and Customs as a "distributing fund" each year to June 2004. It is now listed by HMRC as a "reporting fund" under the new offshore funds rules introduced in December 2009.

=== Move from the Bahamas ===
The company was deeply concerned with maintaining a positive image; minutes from 2001 show directors of Blairmore monitoring the news regarding Panama in order to "ensure that the jurisdiction is in keeping with the company's pristine reputation".

Blairmore Holdings moved to Ireland in either 2010 or 2012, because its directors believed it would "come under more scrutiny" after David Cameron became prime minister. From a UK tax standpoint, the move to Ireland did not stop the company being considered an "offshore fund", but it came under European regulatory rules. Regarding the move, the Financial Times wrote:

It is no longer necessary to go offshore to receive a favourable tax regime for funds. Ireland chose not to impose local taxes on investment funds and over the past 20 years its fund industry has grown rapidly to become the third-largest centre for investment funds after the US and Luxembourg.
The fund industry made a large-scale move to onshore jurisdiction because scandals such as the fraud committed by Bernard Madoff meant that regulators were taking an increasingly dim view of tax opacity and light regulation in "tax havens". The moves were facilitated by the introduction of new rules in Europe governing retail investment funds.

=== Involvement of David Cameron and HMRC ===
In response to his late father's inclusion on the firm's list of clients, David Cameron initially in 2016 said his family's taxes were "a private matter" but later issued a statement saying that he, his wife and children receive no benefit from the company, Blairmore Holdings, which is still in operation and has assets of £35 million. Cameron inherited £300,000 after his father died in 2010. On April 6, Cameron admitted that he had owned shares in Blairmore and sold his shares before becoming prime minister; David and Samantha Cameron sold their holding in Blairmore in January 2010 for £31,500. David Cameron paid income tax on the dividends which he received from Blairmore during his period of ownership, but there was no capital gains tax payable as the gain fell within the annual exempt amount of £10,100 in the 2009-10 tax year.

Private Eye revealed that Edward Troup, appointed executive chair of HMRC in April 2016, was a former partner with Simmons & Simmons, the London-based legal firm whose clients included Blairmore. Papers obtained by the Süddeutsche Zeitung and ICIJ reveal Simmons & Simmons' close relationship with running offshore companies and major overseas property owners, including an investment company run on behalf of Sheikh Hamad bin Abdullah Al Thani, while Troup was its senior tax partner.

=== Political response ===
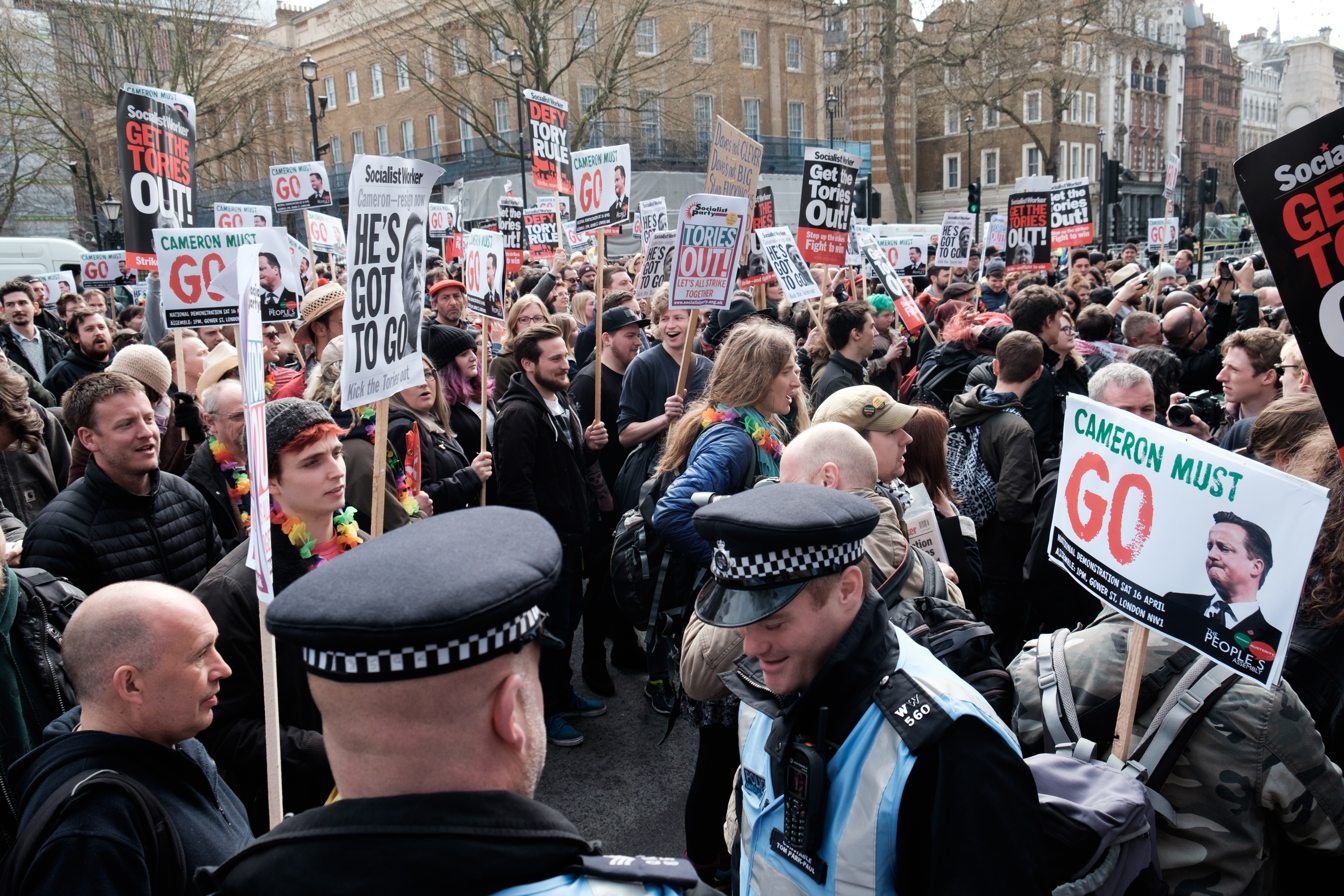
Protesters outside 10 Downing Street call for David Cameron's resignation, April 9, 2016

Prominent members of the Labour Party criticized the involvement of the Cameron family and Blairmore Holdings, Inc. in the Panama Papers leak. Shadow Secretary of State for International Development Diane Abbott described the revelations as "the tip of the iceberg" and "a stitch up", and urged "meaningful reform" of the UK tax authority, HMRC, while Shadow Chancellor of the Exchequer John McDonnell condemned the tax avoidance schemes as "immoral" and described the allegations as "extremely serious", saying "HMRC should treat this with utmost priority and urgently launch investigation". The Leader of the Opposition, Jeremy Corbyn, urged an immediate independent investigation into the tax affairs of the Prime Minister's family, as well as tighter laws on UK tax avoidance. Former Liberal Democrat Home Office Minister Norman Baker called for further investigation of David Cameron's activities. Scottish National Party leader Nicola Sturgeon also called for a clampdown on UK tax avoidance which "stamps out this sort of behaviour" and called for "utter transparency" from David Cameron, adding that "what shocks people most about some of this is that it is not illegal".

Opponents called for Cameron's resignation, especially after he admitted owning shares in Blairmore. Former leader of the SNP Alex Salmond also accused Cameron of "misleading the public" but said that "I'm not calling for his resignation until I get answers" to Cameron not registering offshore investment funds from Blairmore while an MP.

UKIP leader Nigel Farage however has said that most legal tax avoidance was "okay" after he was questioned on why £45,000 of his income was paid into his private company rather than a personal bank account, saying that criticism of his actions was "ridiculous". Farage also said that the possibility of him releasing his tax return was a "big no" as "I think in this county what people earn is regarded as a private matter", and criticized David Cameron for being hypocritical, especially with regards to his past comments about Jimmy Carr's tax avoidance. The BBC noted that "The Isle of Man [where Farage was keeping his income] was one of the UK's crown dependencies which signed an agreement on corporate disclosure at a recent meeting with David Cameron amid claims that individuals and firms are using offshore locations to reduce their tax liabilities", adding that the Isle of Man rejects any allegations that they are used for the purpose of tax avoidance.
