= Greenways School =

Coordinates: 51.16014°N 2.05715°W

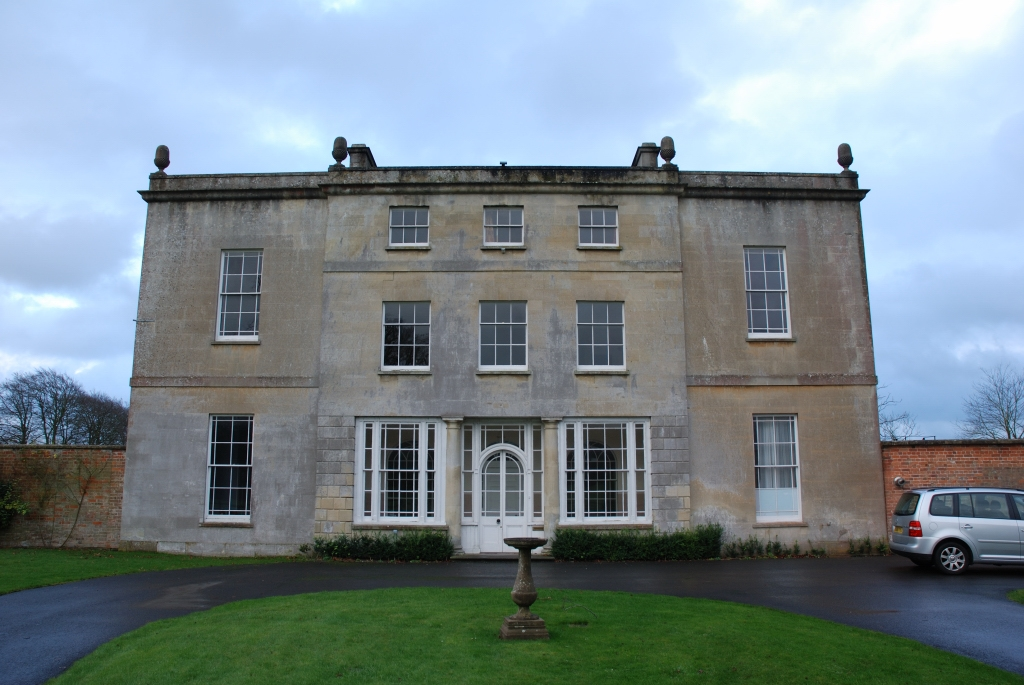
- Bognor Regis (Until 1940); Codford (1940-1969); England

Information
- Type: Private prep school
- Closed: 1969
- Gender: Boys
- Age: 7 to 13 or 14

Greenways School, also known as Greenways Preparatory School, was an English prep school, founded at Bognor Regis, Sussex, before the Second World War. In 1940 it moved to Ashton Gifford House, Codford, Wiltshire, where it remained until it was closed in 1969.

== History ==
The school was a prep school for boys, preparing them for the Common Entrance Examination. Boys were divided into two houses, called Greens and Blues.

In 1928, the school was already established at Aldwick, Sussex, just to the west of Bognor Regis, under Dugald S. Hancock (1897–1963) and his brother-in-law Anthony Maurice Bell. A modern linguist born in the Transvaal, Hancock had been educated at Corpus Christi College, Oxford, with Bell, and was a fellow of the Royal Meteorological Society. In 1929, the school advertised itself in The Times in the following terms:

ALDWICK, SUSSEX, renowned for its bracing climate, possesses a Modern BOYS' PREPARATORY SCHOOL, Greenways; home atmosphere, health, and good food first consideration; sea bathing, riding. — Write Headmaster.

In 1929, Bell left the school on his conversion to Roman Catholicism. He then became Dom Maurice Bell, a Benedictine monk of Downside Abbey and its school Worth Priory, and was headmaster of Worth Preparatory School from 1940 to 1959.

In the 1930s the school was still operated in Sussex by Dugald and Vivien Hancock (formerly Bell), both schoolteachers, but in 1940 it was evacuated to Wiltshire, because of the risk of German bombing on the south coast.

With her husband away from home on Second World War military service, Vivien Hancock took on the role of school principal for the duration of the War, and, as matters turned out, beyond. The daughter of an Oxfordshire clergyman, she became a friend of the poet Siegfried Sassoon, who lived near Codford, at Heytesbury, and whose son George Sassoon was a pupil at the school. At this time many of the boys were the sons of army officers stationed on Salisbury Plain or overseas.

For much of the War the artist Keith Vaughan was stationed at Codford. He painted "The Wall at Ashton Gifford" (1942) "Tree felling at Ashton Gifford" (1942–43), and "The Garden at Ashton Gifford" (1944). He described the school's garden as an "oceanic surging of tangled nettles", with "waist high grass", the wall covered in a "jungle of weed and ivy". For most of the war the future author Adrian Mitchell was a pupil at Greenways, which he later described as "a school in Heaven". His first play, The Animals' Brains Trust, was performed there in 1941.

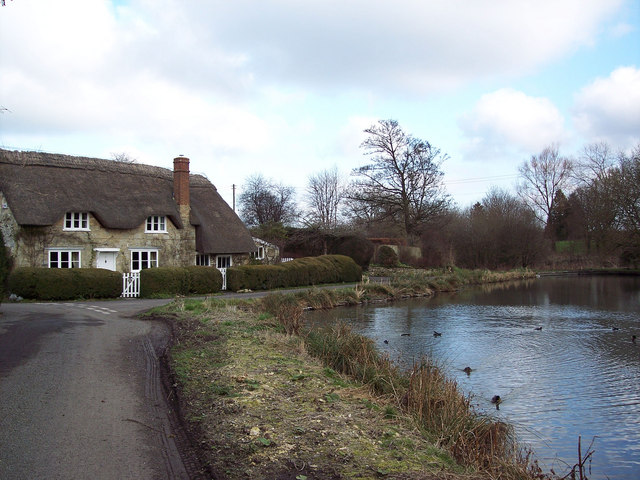
The pond at Sherrington which served as the school's swimming pool.

When Hancock needed money to buy Ashton Gifford House, Siegfried Sassoon lent her £8,000, and he later waived the agreed interest on the loan. In 1944, Sassoon's wife, Hester Sassoon, accused the two of being too close. She also spread such rumours of Mrs Hancock and a local butcher that the headmistress threatened her with a defamation action. The Sassoons separated in 1947.

Vivien married again, becoming Mrs Gibbons and taking on the title of Principal. A schoolmaster named Bernard Ince MA (Oxon) became head master. Nicknamed "Funf", he has been described as "a disciplinarian with a black moustache and a volcanic temper." According to an advertisement in the Schools Handbook of 1947, the school then stood in a park of sixty acres and prepared boys for public schools and the Royal Navy. The curriculum is described thus:

A thorough grounding is given in all subjects. The curriculum includes Nature Study, Elementary Science, Handwork and Country Dancing. Special encouragement is given to music throughout the school and in addition to singing classes there are flourishing percussion bands and talks on musical appreciation. Besides swimming, football and cricket, physical and breathing exercises are given daily and gym, once a week. All boys either become Pioneers or Cubs according to age. There is a riding school in the grounds.

The school's classrooms were whitewashed huts standing apart from the main house, and a barn behind them was used as a gymnasium, where the boys were taught to box. Pupils swam in the mill pond at Sherrington, described as "the Bathing Pool", which had a stony bottom but was approached through mud sometimes fouled by the cows that drank from the pool.

In September 1947 Ferdinand Mount arrived at the school as a day boy. He later wrote of it that it had an air of chaos, impermanence, and "something of Llanabbas, the prep school in Decline and Fall, but also something of a gulag in some distant region of the USSR just this side of Siberia."

In 1949 a fire at the school partly destroyed the Victorian service wing of Ashton Gifford House. This was attributed to an electrical fault, but the cause of the fire was disputed.

In 1956 The Spectator said of Greenways that it was "a Prep School where boys work well because they are treated like human beings and are warm, well fed, and happy." In the 1950s the school had its own nursery department and kindergarten, and was still preparing older boys for Common Entrance and for entrance to high schools.

The last headmaster was L. Keith Hathaway FRGS. The school closed in 1969.

== Notable former pupils ==
- Adrian Mitchell, poet and playwright
- George Sassoon, scientist and author
- Ferdinand Mount, journalist
