= John Barrow (historian) =

English mathematician, naval historian and lexicographer

John Barrow (fl. 1735–1774) was an English mathematician, naval historian and lexicographer. His geographical dictionary first appeared in 1756.

== Life ==
Nothing is known of Barrow's family. He was initially a teacher of mathematics and navigation aboard ships of the Royal Navy. He retired before 1750 and devoted himself to writing and compiling dictionaries and other works related to his knowledge of mathematics and science.

Barrow's best-known work was Navigatio Britannica (1750), a practical handbook of navigation and charts still being advertised by its publisher, Mount & Page, in 1787. It included an examination of nautical instruments and explained the recently introduced vernier scale. Barrow seems to have been in close touch with nautical instrument makers while he was a naval instructor. It was not realized until the 20th century that John Barrow the "geographical compiler" mentioned in the British Dictionary of National Biography (1885 onwards) and the teacher of mathematics were the same person.

In 1756 he published a geographical dictionary anonymously in London.

In the same year, he also published the first edition of his principal work, A Chronological Abridgment or History of the Discoveries made by Europeans in the different parts of the world, whose introduction shows considerable knowledge of astronomical geography in relation to finding latitude and longitude by the stars. The French translation seems to have had more repute than the original work, but even in France Barrow's History of Discoveries was in a few years superseded by that of the Abbé Prévost.

The voyages selected by Barrow are those of Columbus, Vasco da Gama, Cabral, Sir Francis Drake, Sir Walter Raleigh, Sir Thomas Cavendish, Olivier van Noort, Joris van Spilbergen, Abel Tasman, William Dampier, Lionel Wafer, Woodes Rogers, Francisco de Ulloa, Lord Anson, Henry Ellis, and others. The second edition of the compilation appeared in 1765, and was so successful that in the year following a French translation, by Targe, was published at Paris, in twelve volumes.

Barrow created illustrations for Sketches Representing the Native Tribes, Animals, and Scenery of Southern Africa, working alongside Samuel Daniell.

== Selected works ==
- Barrow, John; et al. (1735). Dictionarium polygraphicum, or, The whole body of arts regularly digested : containing the arts of designing, drawing, painting ... adorned with proper sculptures, curiously engraven on more than fifty copper plates. The Online Books Page.
- Dictionarium medicum universale (1749)
- Navigatio Britannia (1750)
- New and Universal Dictionary of Arts and Sciences (1751)
- The Naval History of Great Britain (4 vols, 1758)
- Geographical Dictionary (2 vols, 1759–60)
- A New and Impartial History of England, from the Invasion of Julius Caesar to the Signing of Preliminaries of Peace, 1762 (1763)
- Dictionary of Arts and Sciences (1764)
- A Collection of Authentic, Useful, and Entertaining Voyages and Discoveries (3 vols, 1765)
