= Sir William Mount, 2nd Baronet =

British army officer

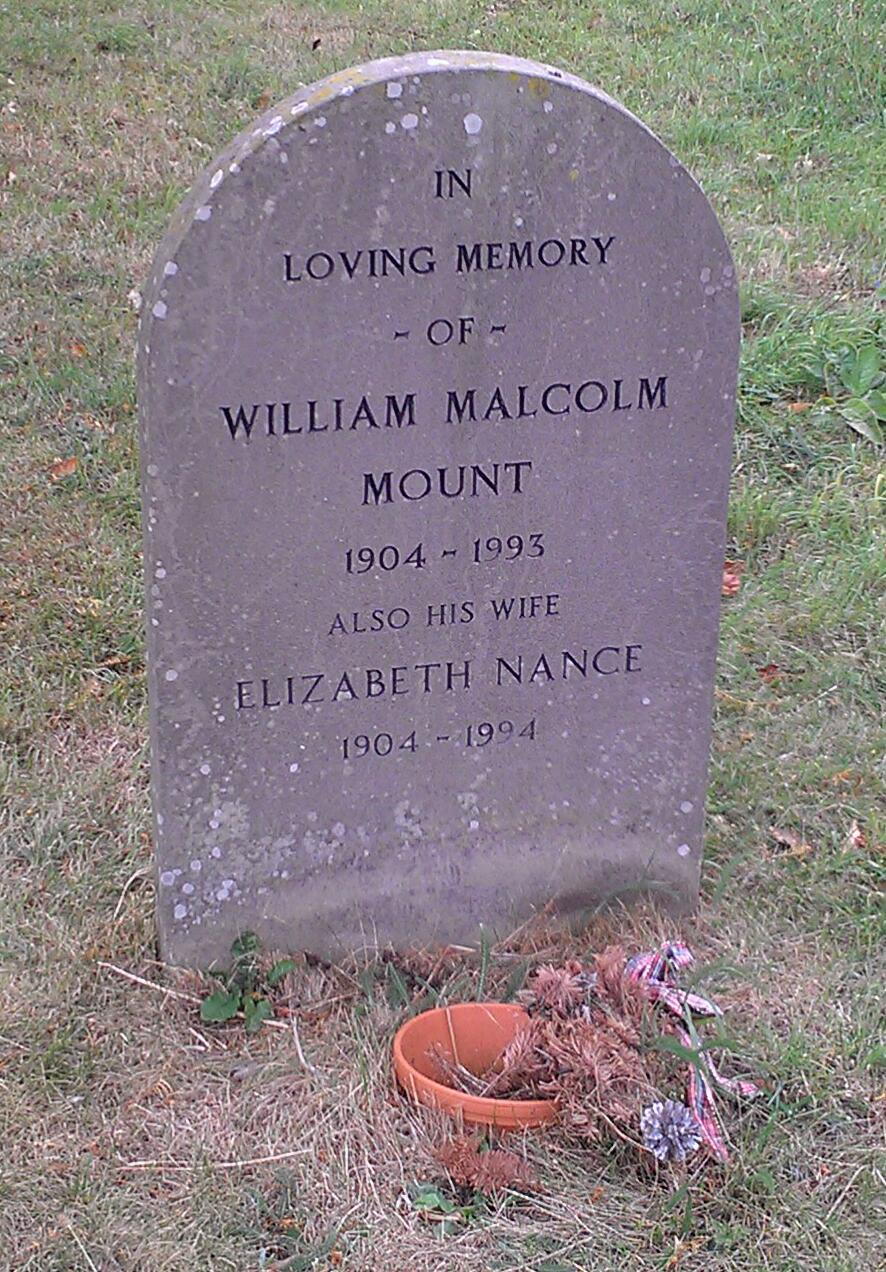
Headstone of William Malcolm Mount at Wasing church.

Lieutenant-Colonel Sir William Malcolm Mount, 2nd Baronet, TD (28 December 1904 – 22 June 1993), was a British Army officer, High Sheriff of Berkshire and maternal grandfather to David Cameron, former UK Prime Minister and leader of the Conservative Party.

== Personal life ==
Eldest son of Sir William Mount, 1st Baronet, and wife Hilda Lucy Adelaide Low, Mount was born on 28 December 1904. He was educated at Eton and New College, Oxford.

On 17 October 1929 at St. John the Baptist, Moulsford, Berkshire (now Oxfordshire), Mount married Elizabeth Nance Llewellyn (Uttoxeter, Staffordshire, 22 December 1904 – 5 December 1994).

His eldest daughter Cecilia Mary (1931–2018) married Sir William Dugdale, a Warwickshire landowner and former chairman of Aston Villa football club, and was the mother of the documentary filmmaker Joshua Dugdale. His second daughter, Mary Fleur (b. 1934), married Ian Donald Cameron and is the mother of David Cameron, Conservative Party leader from 2005 to 2016, Prime Minister of the United Kingdom from 2010 to 2016. His youngest daughter, Viola Clare (b. 1938), married Dr. John Robert Blyth Currie.

== Baronetcy ==
He inherited the Mount baronetcy of Wasing in Berkshire along with the Mount family estates on 8 December 1930 on the death of his father.

== Career ==
=== Military ===
On 25 February 1924, he was commissioned in the 99th (Bucks and Berks Yeomanry), a Territorial Army (TA) unit of the Royal Regiment of Artillery, a second lieutenant. His service number was 28268. He was promoted to lieutenant on 25 February 1926. He was promoted to captain on 1 March 1937, and major on 17 September 1938.

He served in World War II during which time he was wounded at D-Day in Normandy. He transferred to the Reconnaissance Corps on 14 September 1941, and given the service number 28268. He was awarded the Efficiency Decoration (TD) on 15 May 1942. He was made Lieutenant-Colonel.

=== Aviation ===
Mount had interest in aviation, being a director of the Miles Aircraft Company. In 1950 he stood trial with F.G. Miles on 24 charges of making false and reckless statements in connection with the 1946 Miles share prospectus. Mount went on to develop Brimpton Airfield.

=== Berkshire appointments ===
Mount was appointed as High Sheriff of Berkshire, and Deputy Lieutenant for Berkshire in 1960.

== Death ==
He died at the age of 88 in 1993. At the time of his death, he had three daughters but no surviving sons so his baronetcy was inherited by his nephew Ferdinand.

== Arms ==
Coat of arms of Sir William Mount, 2nd Baronet
Crest Upon a mount vert a fox salient proper, supporting a ragged staff erect sable Escutcheon Or on a mount vert a lion rampant azure, ducally crowned or, between in chief two roses gules, barbed and seeded proper Motto Prudenter et Constanter ("Prudently and Constantly")

"Lieutenant-Colonel Sir William Malcolm Mount Bt, TD", FamilySearch

Baronetage of the United Kingdom
Preceded by William Mount	Baronet (of Wasing); 1930–1993	Succeeded by Ferdinand Mount
