= Ferdinand Mount =

British writer (born 1939)

Sir Ferdinand Mount Bt FRSL

Director of Number 10 Policy Unit
- In office 1982–1983
- Prime Minister: Margaret Thatcher
- Preceded by: John Hoskyns
- Succeeded by: John Redwood

Personal details
- Born: William Robert Ferdinand Mount; 2 July 1939 (age 87)
- Spouse: Julia (née Lucas)
- Children: 4, including Harry
- Relatives: Sir William Mount
- Education: Greenways School; Sunningdale School; Eton College
- Alma mater: Christ Church, Oxford
- Occupation: Writer, novelist

Sir William Robert Ferdinand Mount, 3rd Baronet, FRSL (born 2 July 1939), is a British writer, novelist, and columnist for The Sunday Times, as well as a political commentator.

== Life ==
Ferdinand Mount, brought up by his parents in the isolated village of Chitterne, Wiltshire, England, began school at the age of eight. He then attended Greenways and Sunningdale School before Eton College, after which he went to Christ Church, Oxford.

Mount worked at Conservative Party HQ as head of the Number 10 Policy Unit during 1982–83, when Margaret Thatcher was Prime Minister and played a significant part in devising the 1983 general election manifesto.

Mount is regarded as being on the one-nation or "wet" side of the Conservative Party. He succeeded his uncle, Sir William Mount, in the family title as 3rd baronet in 1993, but prefers to remain known as Ferdinand Mount.

For eleven years (1991–2002), he was editor of The Times Literary Supplement, and then became a regular contributor to Standpoint magazine. He wrote for The Sunday Times, and in 2005 joined The Daily Telegraph as a commentator. He writes for the London Review of Books.

Mount has written novels, including a six-volume novel sequence called Chronicle of Modern Twilight, centring on a low-key character, Gus Cotton; the title alludes to the sequence A Chronicle of Ancient Sunlight by Henry Williamson, and another sequence entitled Tales of History and Imagination. Volume 5, entitled Fairness, was long-listed for the Man Booker Prize in 2001.

Mount serves as chairman of the Friends of the British Library and was elected a fellow of the Royal Society of Literature (FRSL) in 1991.

== Family ==
Coat of arms of the Mount baronets of Wasing

The only son of Robert (Robin) Mount, an army officer and amateur steeplechase jockey, and Lady Julia Pakenham, youngest daughter of the 5th Earl of Longford, KP, Ferdinand inherited the baronetcy from his uncle Lt-Col. Sir William Mount, Bt, TD, DL, who died in 1993, having had three daughters, including Mary Cameron, JP (1934−2025), mother of David Cameron, former Prime Minister (and Conservative Party leader).

The Labour politician Frank Pakenham, 7th Earl of Longford, and his brother, Edward Pakenham, 6th Earl of Longford, were Mount's maternal uncles. His maternal aunts were the writers Lady Mary Clive, Lady Pansy Lamb and Lady Violet Powell, the wife of author Anthony Powell.

Sir Ferdinand and his wife, Julia née Lucas, live in Islington, London; he and Lady Mount have three surviving children, William (b. 1969 and heir apparent to the title), Harry (b. 1971, a journalist) and Mary (b. 1972, an editor who is married to Indian writer Pankaj Mishra).

== Works ==
=== Fiction ===
- Very Like a Whale (1967)
- The Clique (1978)
- The Practice of Liberty (1986)
- Making Nice (2021)
- The Pentecost Papers (2025)

==== A Chronicle of Modern Twilight ====
- The Man Who Rode Ampersand (1975)
- The Selkirk Strip (1987)
- Of Love and Asthma (1991), winner of the Hawthornden Prize 1992
- The Liquidator (1995)
- Fairness (2001)
- Heads You Win (2004)

==== Tales of History and Imagination ====
- Umbrella: A Pacific Tale (1994)
- Jem (and Sam): A Revenger's Tale (1999)
- The Condor's Head (2007)

=== Non-fiction ===
- The Theatre of Politics (1972)
- The Subversive Family: An Alternative History of Love and Marriage (1982)
- Communism: A Times Literary Supplement Companion (1992), editor
- The British Constitution Now: Recovery or Decline? (1992)
- The Recovery of the Constitution (Sovereignty Lectures) (1992)
- Mind the Gap: Class in Britain Now (2004)
- Private Life 21st Century (2006)
- Cold Cream: My Early Life and Other Mistakes (2009), memoir
- Full Circle: How the Classical World Came Back to Us (2010)
- The New Few: Power and Inequality in Britain Now or A Very British Oligarchy (2012)
- The Tears of the Rajas: Mutiny, Money and Marriage in India 1805–1905 (2015)
- English Voices: Lives, Landscapes, Laments (2016)
- Prime Movers: From Pericles to Gandhi (2018)
- Kiss Myself Goodbye: The Many Lives of Aunt Munca (2020)
- Big Caesars and Little Caesars: How they rise and fall - from Julius Caesar to Boris Johnson (2023)
- Soft: A Brief History of Sentimentality (2025)

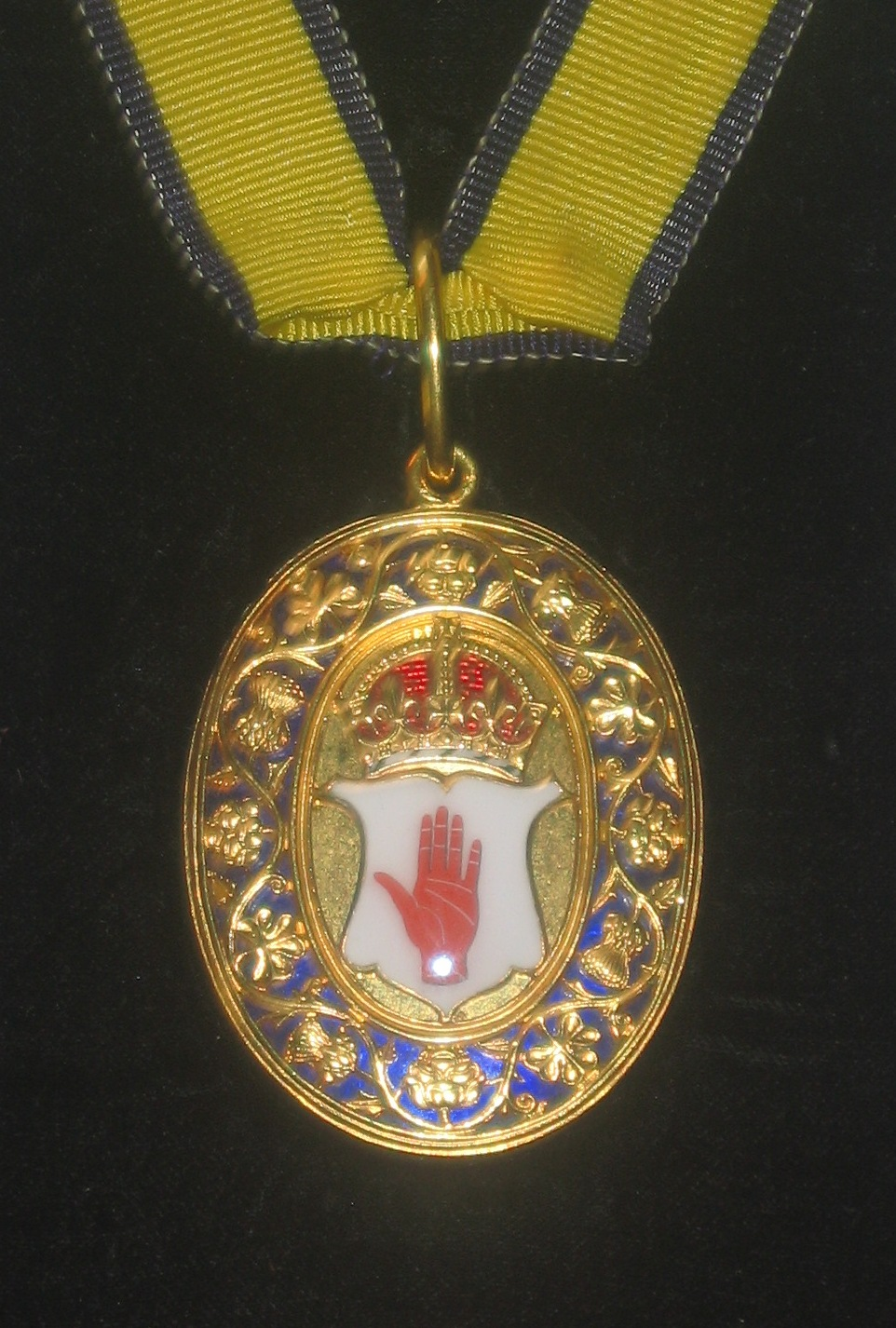
Insignia of baronet

== See also ==
- Mount baronets

Government offices
Preceded by John Hoskyns	Number 10 Policy Unit; 1982–1983	Succeeded by John Redwood
Baronetage of the United Kingdom
Preceded by Sir William Mount	Baronet of Wasing; 1993—	Incumbent
