= Mount & Page =

English publisher of charts and pilot books

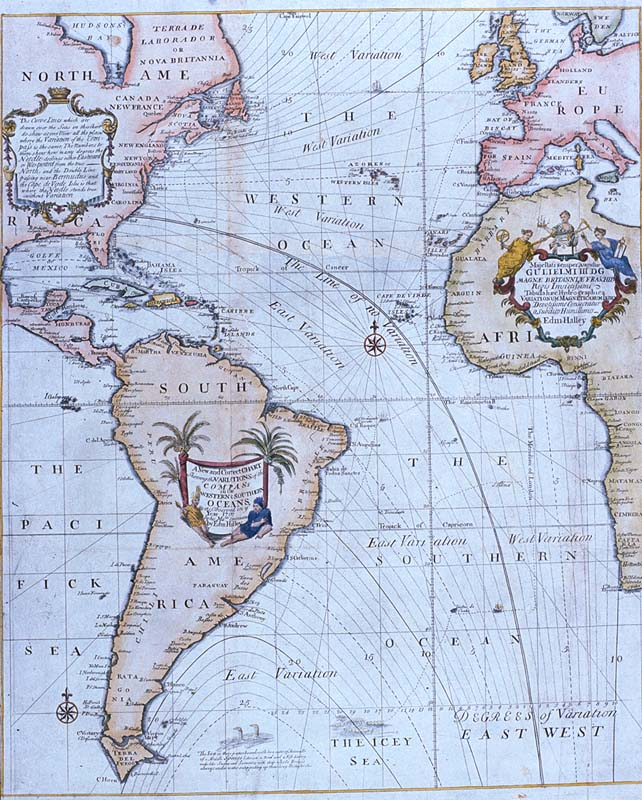
Plate 22 from Mount & Page's 1702 "Atlas Maritimus Novus, or the New Sea-Atlas."

Mount & Page was a firm of religious and maritime publishers that flourished in the eighteenth century. The name became well-known worldwide as an imprint of nautical charts.

The firm was founded in 1701 by Richard Mount (1654–1722) and Thomas Page (active 1700-1733). Mount had previously been in partnership with his father-in-law William Fisher (1631–1692) and inherited the business on the latter's death. As Mount & Page the firm flourished throughout the 18th century and made the fortunes of both families, helped by government contracts. Successive generations of Mounts and Pages worked in the business, and the families intermarried. One of its staple titles was Navigatio Britannica by John Barrow, published in 1750 and still being advertised in 1787.

By the 1760s, Richard Mount's grandson John Mount (1725–1786) was able to retire to Berkshire where he built Wasing Place. John's son William (1753–1815) was the last to work in the business, and later generations went into politics. Direct descendants include David Cameron, MP.
