= Blyth Hall =

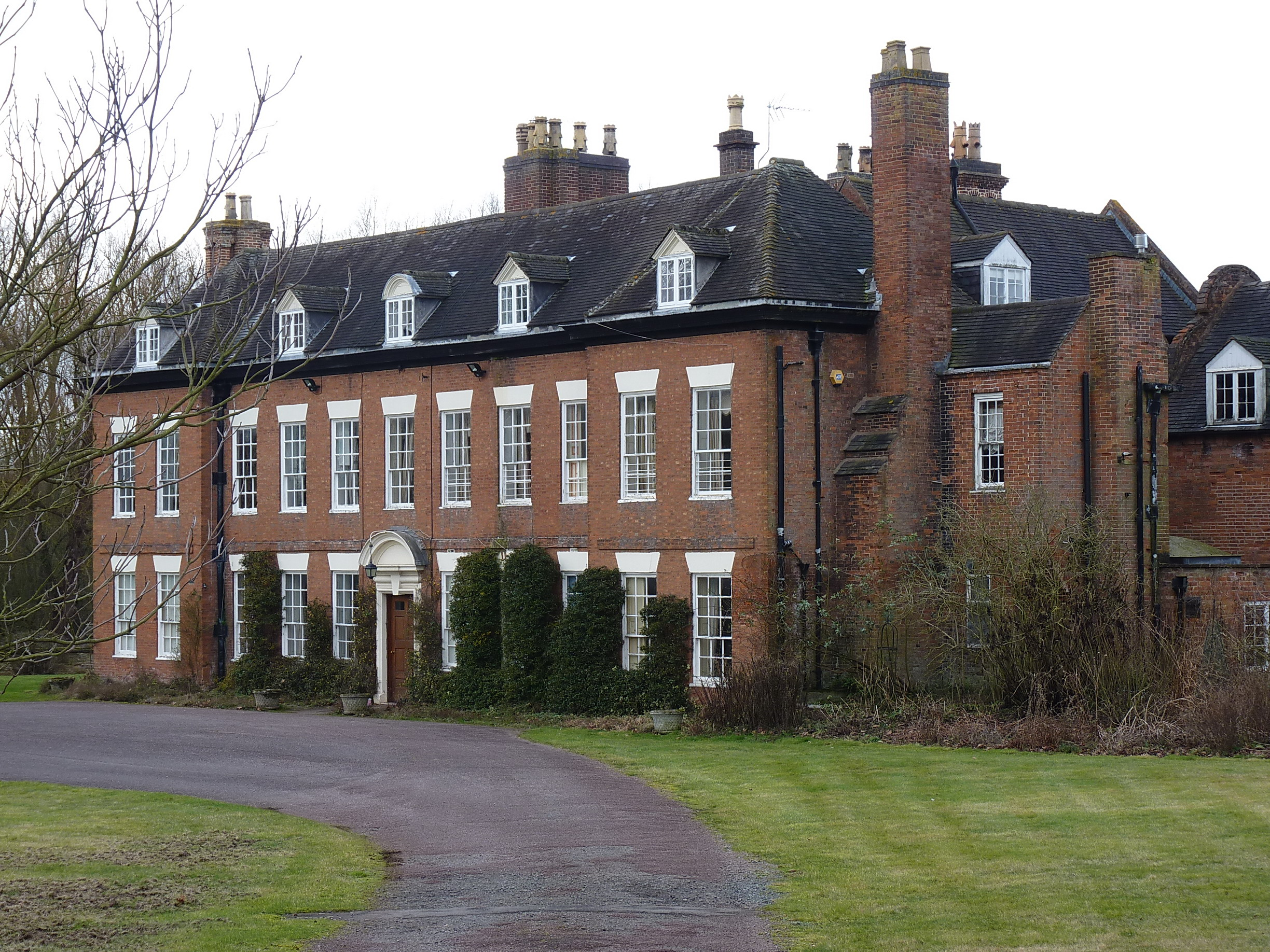
- Interactive map of Blyth Hall
- Location: Shustoke, Warwickshire, England
- Coordinates: 52.5088°N 1.6927°W

Listed Building – Grade I
- Official name: Blyth Hall
- Designated: 11 November 1952
- Reference no.: 1087100

Listed Building – Grade II
- Official name: Stable block adjoining Blyth Hall on the north east and attached gatepier
- Designated: 11 November 1952
- Reference no.: 1034768

Listed Building – Grade II
- Official name: Stable block and coach house approximately 40 metres north of Blyth Hall and attached mounting block and gatepier
- Designated: 11 November 1952
- Reference no.: 1365139

Listed Building – Grade II
- Official name: Offices and service range approximately 50 metres north west of Blyth Hall
- Designated: 23 March 1988
- Reference no.: 1226121

Blyth Hall is a privately owned mansion house on the banks of the River Blythe situated near Shustoke, Warwickshire. It is a Grade I listed building.

The estate was purchased in 1625 by Sir William Dugdale, a prominent antiquarian, who shortly thereafter built a new house on the site. In 1690–1700, the house was substantially enlarged and improved with a twelve-bay brick façade with two storeys and additional upper dormers.

In the 18th century, Jane Dugdale, sole heiress of Blyth, married Richard Geast of Handsworth. Their son, also Richard Geast, married Penelope Stratford, heiress of neighbouring Merivale Hall in 1767. He inherited Blyth from his maternal uncle John Dugdale and changed his name to Dugdale in 1799. Later Dugdales became the Dugdale baronets of Blyth and Merevale.

In May 2024, William Dugdale, the 12th-generation owner, announced that he was opening the hall for events, conferences, and tours in order to fund its upkeep. The hall can accommodate up to 30 people in 13 bedrooms.
