= Merevale Hall =

Country house in Warwickshire, England

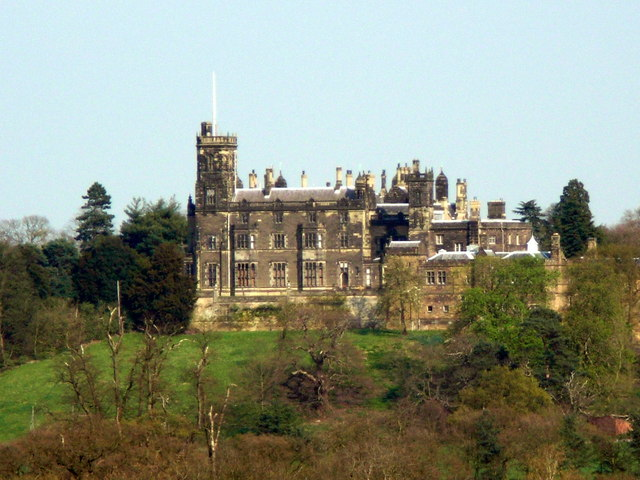
- Interactive map of Merevale Hall
- 52.5733°N 1.5654°W
- Location: Merevale, Warwickshire, England

Listed Building – Grade II*
- Official name: Merevale Hall
- Designated: 25 March 1968
- Reference no.: 1299654

Listed Building – Grade II*
- Official name: Stable Block and attached forecourt walls, gatepiers and gates at Merevale Hall
- Designated: 1 November 1959
- Reference no.: 1185536

National Register of Historic Parks and Gardens
- Official name: Merevale Hall
- Type: Grade II*
- Designated: 1 February 1986
- Reference no.: 1001190

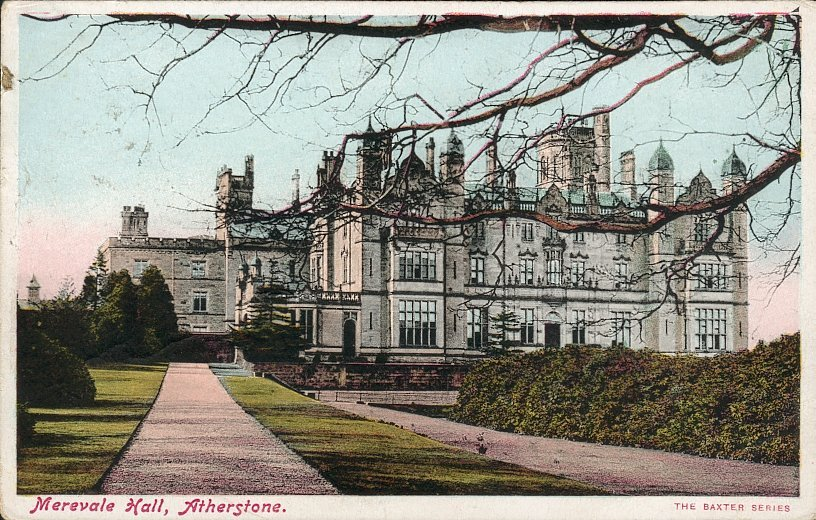
Postcard view

Merevale Hall is a private country house in Merevale, near Atherstone, Warwickshire, England. It is a Grade II* listed building. The estate descends from Merevale Abbey which once stood on the site.

The Manor of Merevale was granted in 1540 to Sir Walter Devereux. The Devereux estates were sequestered in 1601 following the attainder and execution of Robert Devereux, 2nd Earl of Essex for treason.

The estate was purchased by Edward Stratford in 1649 and became the seat of the Stratford family. In 1767 the Merevale sole heiress Penelope Stratford married Richard Geast who had inherited the neighbouring estate of Blyth Hall from his maternal uncle John Dugdale in 1749 and who in 1799 adopted the surname Dugdale.

The old 17th-century seven bayed manor house was rebuilt in 1840 in monumental style to designs by architect Edward Blore. Particular features include a square central tower and four slim corner towers topped by cupolas.

The Dugdales later became Dugdale baronets, of Merevale and Blyth. The family remain in residence at both estates.

The Hall is not open to the public.

== Lakes ==
There are several lakes including Merevale Lake, Black Pool and Abbey Pool. The lakes were originally constructed by the Merevale Abbey monks for fishing.
