= The Oldie =

British monthly magazine

- Editor: Harry Mount
- Categories: General interest, humour, culture
- Frequency: Every four weeks
- Publisher: James Pembroke
- Total circulation (Jan-Jun 2020): 47,107
- Founder: Richard Ingrams
- Founded: 1992; 33 years ago
- Company: Oldie Publications Ltd.
- Country: United Kingdom
- Based in: London
- Language: English
- Website: www.theoldie.co.uk
- ISSN: 0965-2507

The Oldie is a British monthly magazine written for older people "as a light-hearted alternative to a press obsessed with youth and celebrity", according to its website. The magazine was launched in 1992 by Richard Ingrams, who was its editor for 22 years, following 23 years as editor at Private Eye.

In June 2014, after Ingrams' dispute with the magazine's publisher had led to his departure, Alexander Chancellor became the editor. Chancellor died in January 2017, and Harry Mount took over the editorship. That year, the magazine celebrated its 25th anniversary, and its circulation continues to rise.

== History and outline ==
The magazine was founded in 1992 by Richard Ingrams, previously editor of Private Eye, together with Alexander Chancellor. The magazine aimed to contrast with youth culture. The Independent on Sunday described it as "The most original magazine in the country". The Oldie magazine is owned by Oldie Publications Ltd.

It carries articles of general interest, humour and cartoons. Its contributors have included Gyles Brandreth, Craig Brown, Virginia Ironside, Stephen Glover, Barry Humphries, David Horspool and Melanie McFadyean. It is sometimes regarded as a haven for "grumpy old men and women", an image it has played up to over the years with such slogans as "The Oldie: Buy it before you snuff it", its lampooning of youth subculture, and what it sees as the absurdities of modern life. It was the first mainstream publication to break the Jimmy Savile sexual abuse scandal.

Despite being called The Oldie, the magazine often stresses that it is not an age-specific publication, and has many readers in their twenties, thirties and forties. It has similarities to Punch, Viz, The Spectator, Private Eye, and The New Yorker.

== Oldie of the Year Awards ==
The Oldie of the Year Awards (TOOTY) is the magazine's annual awards ceremony, hosted by Terry Wogan until 2014, and Gyles Brandreth since then at Simpson's-in-the-Strand and more recently at The Savoy. The awards celebrate lifetime achievement, as well as "oldie" achievements and/or notoriety over the previous year, the whole ceremony being very much tongue-in-cheek. Past winners include Clarissa Eden, Countess of Avon, Dame Olivia de Havilland, David Hockney, Dame Eileen Atkins, Ian Paisley, Stanley Baxter, Peter Blake, Dame Angela Lansbury, Glenda Jackson, Sheila Hancock, Barry Humphries, Moira Stuart and Sir Ken Dodd. At the magazine's 2011 awards, HRH Prince Philip was named Consort of the Year.

In 2017, former prime minister David Cameron's mother, Mary Cameron, was honoured with a "Mother Knows Best" award in recognition of her signing a petition condemning a decision by Oxfordshire County Council to close over 40 children's centres in the Conservative-run area while her son was prime minister. In 2021, Oldie of the Year was offered to HM Queen Elizabeth II, but she politely declined to accept the award, stating that she did not meet the criteria since "You are only as old as you feel".

The Oldie monthly Literary Lunches are also held in London (at Simpson's-in-the-Strand). Guests over the years have included Michael Palin, Clive James, Maureen Lipman, Mary Berry, Colin Dexter, Joan Bakewell, Matthew Parris, Chris Mullin, Erwin James and P. D. James.

== Writers ==
- Stephen Glover – Media Matters
- Lucinda Lambton – Overlooked Britain
- Brigid Keenan – Getting Dressed
- Frances Wilson – Television
- Elisabeth Luard – Food columnist
- Virginia Ironside – Agony Aunt
- David Horspool – History
- Tom Hodgkinson – Town Mouse
- Andrew Robson – Bridge
- Melanie McFadyean – Pearls of Wisdom
