= Ahead of the Curve =

2008 memoir by Philip Delves Broughton

- Author: Philip Delves Broughton
- Language: English
- Subject: Business
- Genre: Memoir, Sociology
- Publisher: Penguin Press
- Publication date: 2008
- Publication place: United States
- Media type: Print (Hardcover) Audiobook
- Pages: 283
- ISBN: 978-1-59420-175-2

Ahead of the Curve: Two Years at Harvard Business School (titled What They Teach You at Harvard Business School: My Two Years in the Cauldron of Capitalism outside of the United Kingdom) is a non-fiction book by author and journalist Philip Delves Broughton. It was published by Penguin Press in 2008. The book covers the author's two year experience at the Harvard Business School (HBS).
