= Corporation of Foreign Bondholders =

- Council of Foreign Bondholders
- Formation: 1868
- Founder: Private holders of debt securities issued by foreign governments
- Founded at: London
- Dissolved: 1988; 38 years ago
- Legal status: Association
- Purpose: Help investors deal with the government defaults
- Location: London, United Kingdom
- Region served: Worldwide
- Official language: English
- Affiliations: Board of Trade and the Bank of England

The Corporation of Foreign Bondholders (also known as the Council of Foreign Bondholders) was a British association established in London in 1868 by private holders of debt securities issued by foreign governments, states and municipalities.

In an era before extensive financial regulation and of wide sovereign immunity, it provided a forum for British creditors to co-ordinate their actions during the financial boom from the 1860s to the 1950s. It created an important mechanism through which investors could formulate proposals to deal with the government defaults, particularly in the Great Depression following the 1929 Wall Street crash, including several early debt restructurings. It would operate until 1988 when it was wound up.

== History ==
=== Foundation ===
The CFB was a not-for-profit organisation established in 1868. Its formation was triggered by a series of sovereign debt defaults in the mid-19th century. It was incorporated in 1873, under a licence from the Board of Trade, governed by a committee of representatives from brokerages and banks.

In early years, bondholders criticised the settlements that it reached with defaulting bond issuers. Decisions to accept a proposal were voted on at public meetings of members, but it was suspected that banks that underwrote the debt were influencing the decisions.

=== Corporation of Foreign Bondholders Act 1898 ===
Corporation of Foreign Bondholders Act 1898
- Act of Parliament
- Parliament of the United Kingdom
- Long title: An Act to reconstitute the Corporation of Foreign Bondholders.
- Citation: 61 & 62 Vict. c. cxlix

Dates
- Royal assent: 25 July 1898

Text of statute as originally enacted

To address these concerns, the CFB was reconstituted in 1899 under an act of Parliament, the Corporation of Foreign Bondholders Act 1898 (61 & 62 Vict. c. cxlix), which gave it the statutory duty to "watch over and protect the rights and interests of holders of public securities wherever issued but especially of foreign and colonial securities" (article 4(a) of the act). A new Council was created with 21 members: six nominated by the British Bankers Association, six by the London Chamber of Commerce, and nine co-opted by the council. Its officers were paid relatively small annual stipends, funded by its members.

To assist members to co-ordinate their actions, the CFB collected and disseminated information about the jurisdictions in which its members invested, including confidential information delivered by its agents in some countries. Ots Annual Reports summarised the debt history of relevant countries, accompanied by economic data and political information. It also provided a reading room and library and ran lectures. Most services were free to members, funded by the interest on an initial subscription fund, and, later by including its costs in any settlements made with defaulters.

Ad hoc committees were formed on request to deal with specific situations if a country was in difficulties. Representatives of the CFB would deal directly with a defaulting country on behalf of its members, giving it considerable influence. To ensure consensus decisions, one principle followed was equal treatment of all classes of bondholder.

=== Cooperation with other organisations ===
The CFB worked with other British associations of investors, including the League Loans Committee, the Chinese Bondholders Committee, and the Committee of British Long-Term and Medium Term Creditors of Germany. In several cases, its actions were co-ordinated with bondholders outside the UK.

The CFB maintained good relations with bondholders in other countries, including the bourses in Rotterdam and Amsterdam; Brussels and Antwerp; Frankfurt, Berlin, and Hamburg; Paris; and (to a lesser extent) New York. The CFB also maintained good relations with the British government, particularly HM Treasury and the Foreign Office, but the government was generally reluctant to exert diplomatic influence on behalf of private investors.

=== Applying pressure on defaulters ===
The CFB's main mechanism to bring defaulting countries to the table was to make it difficult for defaulters to make further borrowings. The CFB exerted social pressure to discourage lending to countries in default until the default was resolved. The London Stock Exchange would refuse to list new securities issued by defaulters, and in extreme cases, it could delist existing securities.

A few times, when British diplomatic interests aligned with those of investors, gunboat diplomacy was used: Britain occupied the defaulting Egypt in 1882, and Britain, Germany, and Italy blockaded the defaulting Venezuela in 1902. The differences in practices between investors in the UK and the US often led to conflicting desires, and the Monroe Doctrine often allowed countries in Central and South American to default with impunity until Theodore Roosevelt announced in 1905 that Latin American countries could no longer use the US as a shield to avoid their debt obligations. More formal dispute resolution (mediation, arbitration, or litigation) were largely unsuccessful.

=== End and wind-up ===
The CFB became less active after the Second World War, and it became closely aligned with the Bank of England. It was formally wound up in 1988. Its archives are held by the Guildhall Library in London.

=== Legacy ===
Related to the CFB is the United States Foreign Bondholders Protective Council (FBPC). In 1933, at the request of the Department of State, President Franklin D. Roosevelt, by Executive Order, created the Foreign Bondholders Protective Council to assist US citizens and creditors in collecting on defaulted foreign government bonds. Prior to formation of the private, non-profit FBPC, no permanent organization existed to negotiate settlements with defaulting debtors. The Council was particularly active before the Second World War and again in the 1970s and 1980s.

As recently as 2002, both the Department of State and the Securities and Exchange Commission recommended creditors who hold more than 18,000 Chinese government bonds issued between 1913 and 1942 to seek the FBPC's assistance in negotiating fair settlements.

== See also ==
- Bond vigilante
- Sovereign default
- Debt crisis
- Government debt
- Vulture fund
