= Panmure Gordon =

UK investment bank

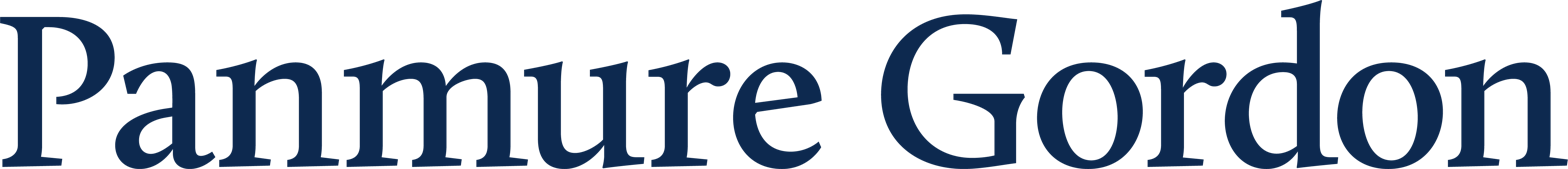
- Type: Private
- Industry: Investment Banking
- Founded: 1876; 150 years ago
- Founder: Harry Panmure Gordon
- Headquarters: London, United Kingdom
- Key people: Rich Ricci, Chief Executive Officer, Richard Morecombe, President and Head of Equities
- Products: Investment Banking, Brokerage, Capital Markets, Institutional Equities, Investment Funds
- Number of employees: over 100
- Website: www.panmure.com

Panmure Gordon was a UK based investment bank, providing a full range of services including investment banking, trading, research and sales with distribution to the UK, Europe and the US. On 1 July 2024 Panmure Gordon merged with Liberum Capital to create Panmure Liberum.

The firm was headquartered in the City of London at 40 Gracechurch Street. Upon the merger with Liberum, the newly-formed Panmure Liberum moved to Ropemaker Place, 25 Ropemaker Street.

Employing 150 people, Panmure Gordon was led by chief executive, Rich Ricci, who was appointed in 2020.

In 2009, Panmure Gordon welcomed QInvest, the leading investment bank in Qatar, as a strategic investor. In 2017 Panmure Gordon was acquired by Ellsworthy Limited, an entity owned and controlled by QInvest LLC and by a wholly owned subsidiary of a fund managed by Atlas Merchant Capital LLC.

== History ==
The firm was founded in 1876 by Harry Panmure Gordon (1837-September 1, 1902) as Gordon & Co. and was subsequently renamed H. Panmure Gordon & Company. The firm's founder was a well-known member of the financial community in London and in 1892 H. Panmure Gordon wrote the book Land of the Almighty Dollar, a critical review of the U.S., particularly New York and Chicago. Panmure Gordon initially specialized in debt offerings for foreign governments. The firm also developed a reputation for conducting offerings for a large number of British and American breweries, including for the San Francisco Brewing Company in 1890.

The company remained a small but influential player, primarily acting as a broker for a number of foreign governments. However, the firm largely avoided the wave of consolidation in the 1960s and 1970s, making only one small acquisition with the purchase of Windsor & Mabey in 1961.

In 1987, the firm was acquired by NationsBank (later part of Bank of America ending more than a century as an independent firm. The firm would be sold again in 1996 to the German bank WestLB, however, the firm would languish as the overall bank experienced various issues in the late 1990s and early 2000s. As part of a major restructuring of the bank, Panmure Gordon was sold again in 2004 to Lazard for the nominal amount of $18 million. In February 2005, Lazard merged Panmure Gordon with a small listed brokerage firm, Durlacher, which had lost money trying to establish a venture funding business during the dot-com boom. The combination resulted in Panmure Gordon once again becoming an independent firm with Lazard retaining a 33% stake in the company which was listed on London's AIM.

In 2006, the firm entered into a joint venture with the Bank of Scotland, known as Panmure Capital, that provided financing for companies that are close to an initial public offering on London's AIM. In March 2007 Panmure Gordon acquired ThinkEquity Partners, LLC a US-based investment bank.

By 2007, Lazard had sold its remaining interest in the firm and during the 2008 financial crisis, Panmure Gordon instead raised capital from outside investors. In April, Panmure Gordon announced that it had received a £17.3 million cash injection from BlueGem Capital Partners, a private equity firm. However, subsequently a higher bidder emerged and on 6 August 2009 the company announced the completion of a sale of a 47.1% stake in the business to QInvest, the largest investment bank in Qatar. Per The Sunday Times, by 2016 London tycoon Mehmet Dalman's flagship investment bank Wealth Management Group ("WMG") was plotting a takeover of Panmure Gordon and had built up a 9% stake in it and had "hatched a turnaround plan for the struggling company".
