= Wasing =

Coordinates: 51°22′N 1°10′W

- Village and civil parish
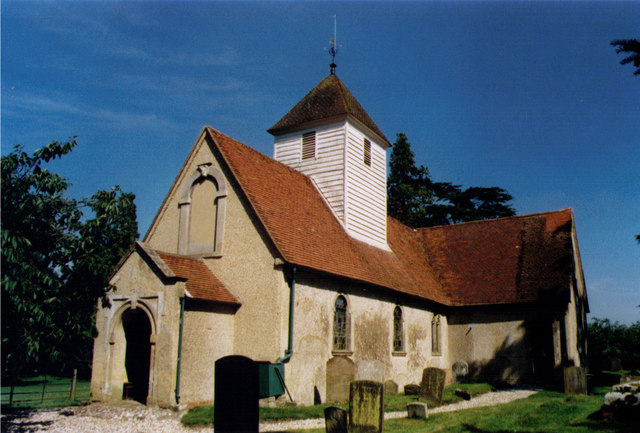
- St Nicholas' Church

- Location within Berkshire
- Civil parish: Wasing
- Unitary authority: West Berkshire
- Ceremonial county: Berkshire
- Region: South East
- Country: England
- Sovereign state: United Kingdom
- Post town: Reading
- Postcode district: RG7
- Police: Thames Valley
- Fire: Royal Berkshire
- Ambulance: South Central
- UK Parliament: Newbury

Wasing is an agricultural and woodland village, country estate and civil parish in West Berkshire, England owned almost wholly by the descendants of the Mount family. In local administration, its few inhabitants convene their own civil parish, but share many facilities with Brimpton.

== Geography ==
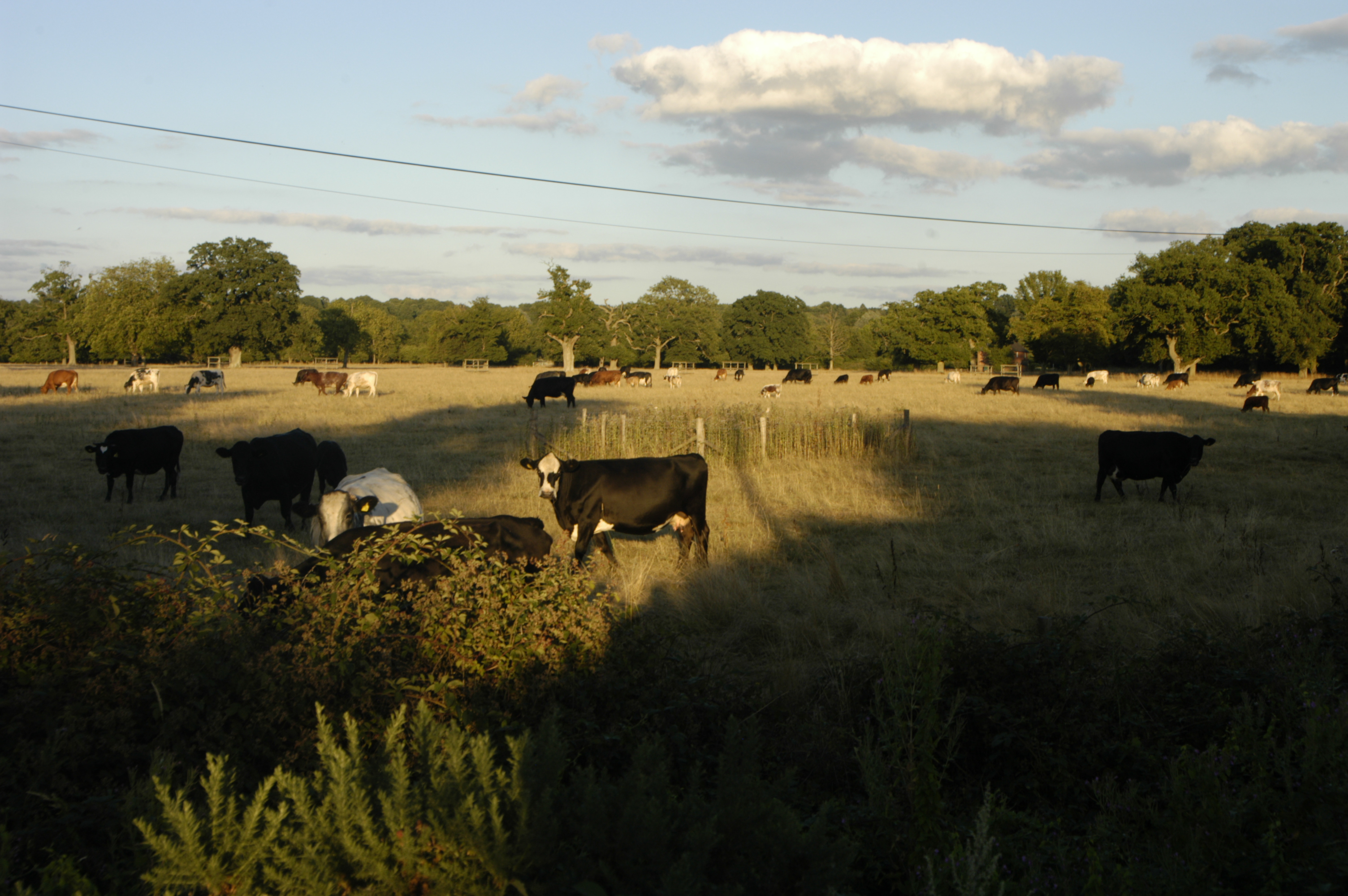
Wasing, cattle in the park, summer 2013, looking approximately along the line of the Roman road from Speen to Silchester.

Wasing has fields on the Berkshire-Hampshire border and is approximately 7.5 miles (12.1 km) south-east of Newbury. Its nearest village with general amenities is Aldermaston and its nearest town is Tadley. Its western boundary is the River Enborne, which flows through the range of downs which start in the south of the parish, rising to the highest point in the south-east, Walbury Hill 5 miles (8.0 km) west. Wasing Wood Ponds is a site of Special Scientific Interest (SSSI).

== History ==
The manor of Wasing was owned by the College of the Valley Scholars in Salisbury when it was dissolved in 1542. The manor was soon sold by the Crown to Sir Humphrey Forster, a king's servant.

== Wasing Place ==
Wasing Place, Wasing Park, and the Wasing Estate, including woodland, are largely owned and managed by Joshua Dugdale, who inherited them from his mother, Lady Cecilia Dugdale. Its estate is centred on a manor house which was purchased in 1759 by the London nautical publisher, John Mount. He built Wasing Place, completed in 1770, which became the home of his descendants, including MPs, William Mount, William George Mount and Sir William Mount. The house was partially rebuilt in 1954 after a fire in 1945.

The Georgian house has a 180° panorama. Wasing Park, to the north of the house, is Grade II listed. The adjacent church of St Nicholas, remaining almost a private chapel due to its isolation, is Grade I listed, with parts of the building dating to the 13th century.
