= Secret Places, Hidden Sanctuaries =

2009 book

Secret Places, Hidden Sanctuaries: Uncovering Sites, Symbols, and Societies
- Author: Stephen Klimczuk and Gerald Warner of Craigenmaddie
- Cover artist: Ben Gibson / Ben Gibson Studio
- Language: English
- Subject: Travel essays; Parapsychology; Occultism; Antiquities; Sacred sites; Curiosities and wonders
- Publisher: Sterling Publishing, New York / London
- Publication date: November 3, 2009 (US first edition)
- Media type: Print (Hardcover)
- Pages: 272 pp
- ISBN: 978-1-4027-6207-9

Secret Places, Hidden Sanctuaries: Uncovering Mysterious Sites, Symbols, and Societies is a 2009 book called a "robust and skeptical look at the kind of esoteric nonsense celebrated in The Da Vinci Code."

The book itself covers various sites and societies favored by conspiracy theorists and unexplained mystery enthusiasts, including Rosslyn Chapel, Area 51, Skull and Bones, Opus Dei, the Esalen Institute, Mount Weather, Heinrich Himmler's Wewelsburg Castle, Montecristo island and Disneyland's Club 33.

In this work, the authors seek to put forward new evidence (and novel theories) about some 150 controversial places and legends, including the following hypotheses:

- That the Mediterranean island of Montecristo, an Italian government exclusion zone forbidden to visitors without special permission, may conceal the greatest hidden treasure of all time—the immense booty of Turkish pirate and admiral Turgut Reis.
- That contrary to the commonly held view that Yale's Skull and Bones society was founded as a chapter or branch of a German university "corps", it bears none of the hallmarks of a student corps, but rather resembles the esoteric and Masonic lodges of early 19th-century Germany.
