= Gerald Warner =

Scottish newspaper columnist

James Gerald Warner of Craigenmaddie
- Born: 1945 (age 80–81)
- Education: University of Glasgow
- Occupation: Journalist
- Political party: Conservative

James Gerald Warner of Craigenmaddie (born 1945) is a Scottish newspaper columnist, author, broadcaster, commentator, and former policy adviser to Michael Forsyth when he was Secretary of State for Scotland.

== Biography ==
A graduate of the University of Glasgow (Honours MA in Medieval and Modern History), he has been a columnist and social diarist (i.e. society editor) for The Sunday Times, a columnist and editorial (i.e. leader) writer for Scotland on Sunday, and a leader writer for the Scottish Daily Mail. Although his legal name in Scotland is "James Gerald Warner of Craigenmaddie", he does not appear to use this formal style in his journalistic writing, preferring "Gerald Warner".

During the 1990s Conservative government of Prime Minister John Major, he left journalism to become Special Adviser to the Secretary of State for Scotland, the British cabinet minister responsible for Scottish affairs. He had previously been, in 1974, an unsuccessful Parliamentary candidate.

He is the author of seven books, primarily on specialised historical subjects, curiosities, and folklore. His official history of the Scottish Conservative Party included a foreword by Margaret Thatcher. He has spoken of his book Secret Places, Hidden Sanctuaries (written with co-author Stephen Klimczuk) as a "robust and sceptical look at the kind of esoteric nonsense celebrated in The Da Vinci Code." It covers various sites and societies favoured by conspiracy theorists and unexplained mystery enthusiasts, including Rosslyn Chapel, Area 51, Skull and Bones, Opus Dei, the Esalen Institute, Mount Weather, Heinrich Himmler's Wewelsburg Castle, Montecristo island, and Disneyland's Club 33.

He is a Fellow of the Society of Antiquaries of Scotland, and undertook three years of postgraduate research in Irish history after his university degree. He has written about being part of that "dwindling band of individualists who persist in defying the zeitgeist" by wearing a monocle.

In 2014 it was announced by press release that Gerald Warner would be writing for www.traditionalright.com. In a second press release it was announced that Warner was currently writing a satirical parody of Ayn Rand's The Fountainhead, to be published under an open source licence.

== Anti-Cameronism ==
As a social conservative, Warner was a staunch opponent of David Cameron, former leader of the British Conservative Party and Prime Minister of the United Kingdom. He argues that Cameron and other Tory "modernisers" have antagonised British social conservatives, especially through their pragmatic acceptance of LGBT rights as a fait accompli, given the reforms of the Brown and Blair administrations.

After the advent of a hung parliament as a result of that election, he continued to do so after the resultant formation of the Conservative and Liberal Democrat coalition and advent of David Cameron's premiership.

He was billed to address the Annual Conference of the Traditional Britain Group in October 2014, but backed out at the last moment without any explanation.

== Books ==
- (with Stephen Klimczuk) (2009). Secret Places, Hidden Sanctuaries: Uncovering Mysterious Sites, Symbols, and Societies. New York: Sterling Ethos.
- The Sacred Military Order of St. Stephen Pope and Martyr. Pisa: Edizione ETS. 2004.
- The Scottish Tory Party: A History. London: Weidenfeld & Nicolson. 1988. (with a foreword by Margaret Thatcher)
- Conquering by Degrees. University of Glasgow. 1985.
- Tales of the Scottish Highlands. London: Shepheard-Walwyn. 1982.
- Being of Sound Mind. London: Elm Tree Books. 1980.
- Homelands of the Clans. London: Collins. 1980.
