= Go Away Green =

Color used in Disney amusement parks

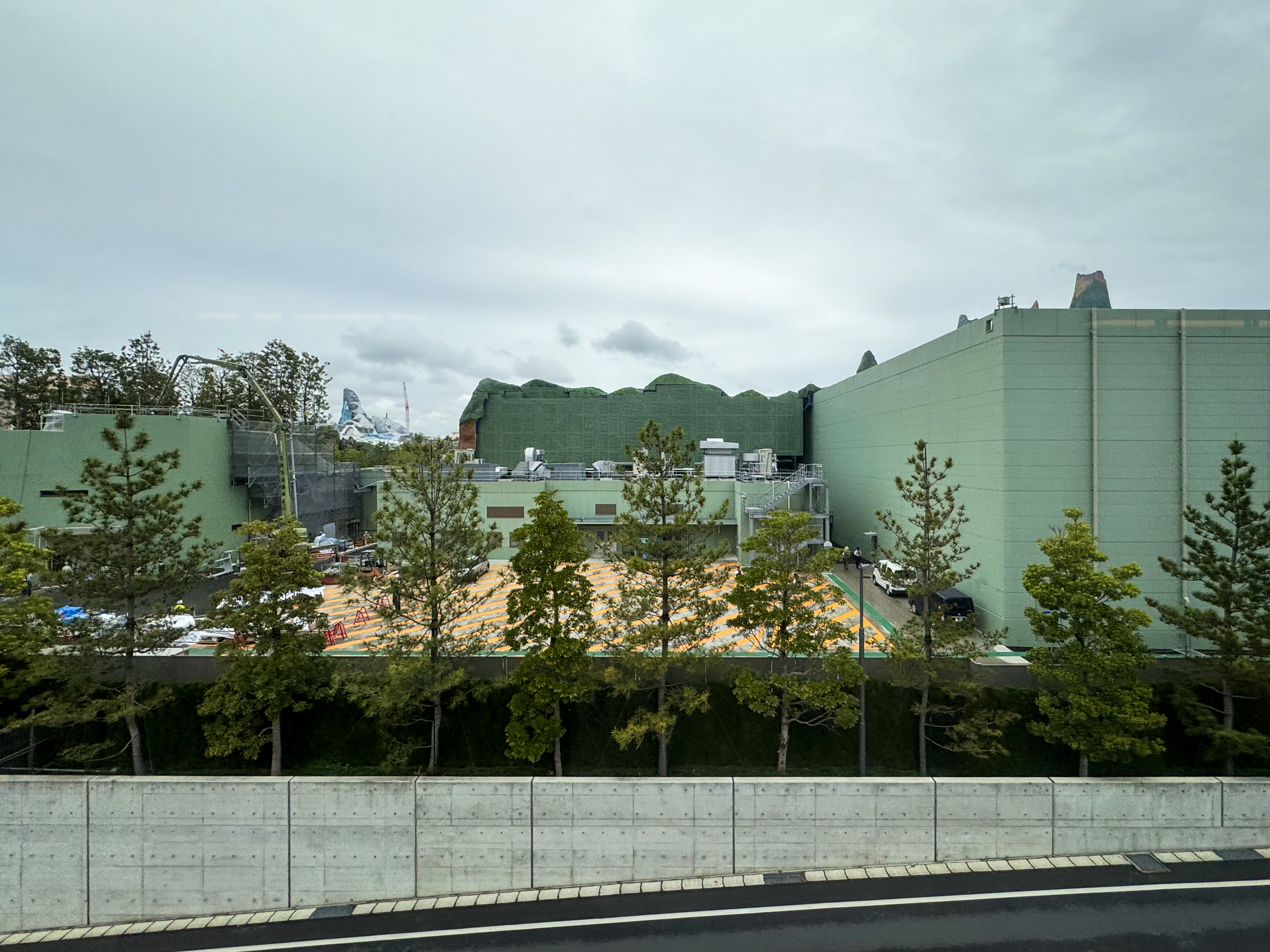
Buildings for Fantasy Springs attractions as seen from the Disney Resort Line

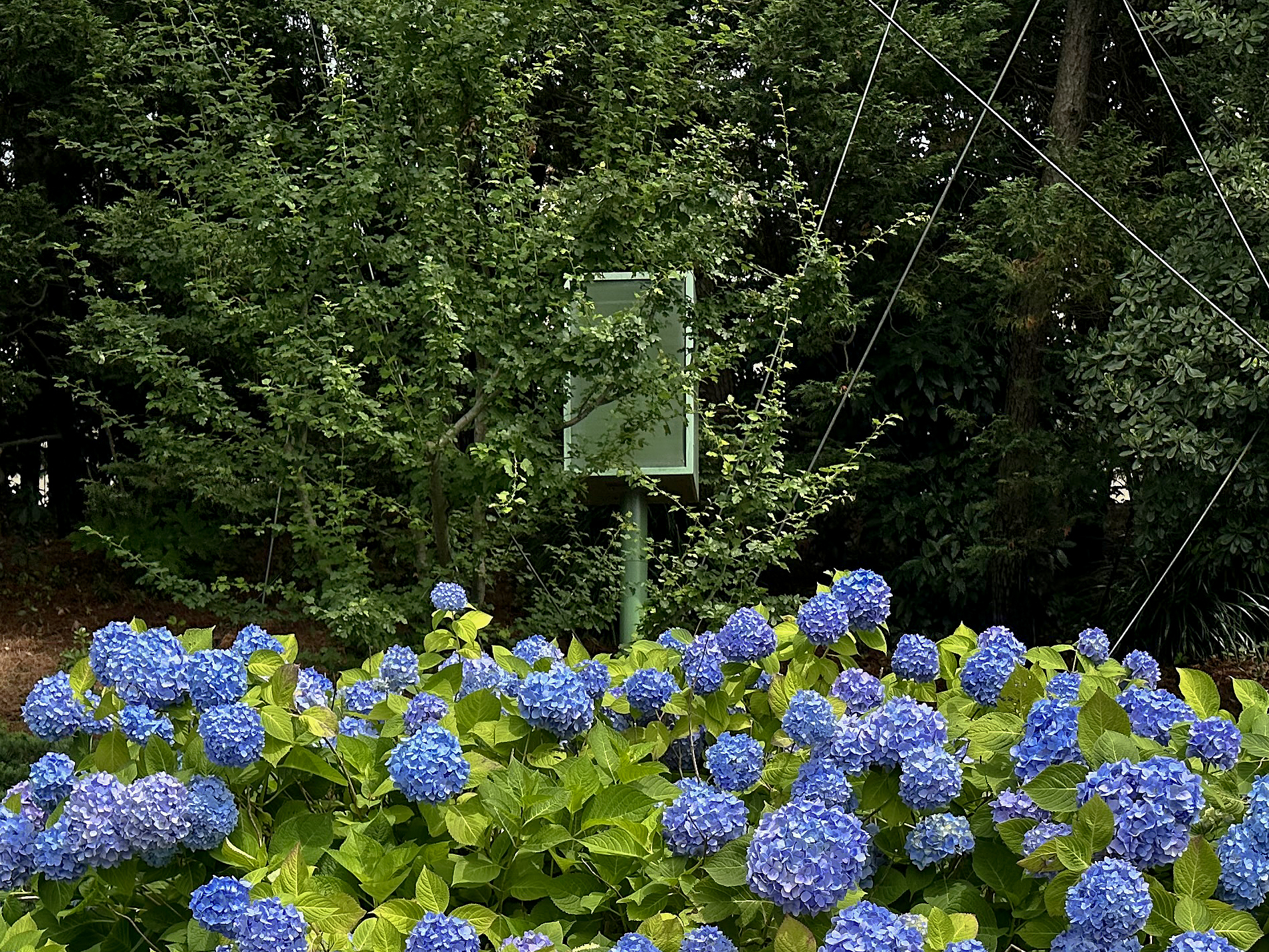
Speaker at Tokyo Disneyland disguised with Go Away Green

Go Away Green refers to a range of paint colors used in Disney Parks to divert attention away from infrastructure. It has been compared to military camouflage like Olive Drab.

Imagineer John Hench wrote about developing such colors, "We chose a neutral gray-brown for the railing, a 'go away' color that did not call attention to itself, even though it was entirely unrelated to the Colonial color scheme."

Large attraction buildings visible either inside or outside a park such as Soarin’ at California Adventure or Indiana Jones Adventure at Disneyland are often painted a muted green. Necessary in-park infrastructure like speakers, lamp posts, fences, trash cans, and the former entrance to Club 33 are also painted various shades of green.

This concept also extends to grays, browns, and blues for spaces with less greenery or buildings that extend above the tree line, such as Guardians of the Galaxy: Cosmic Rewind.

== Gallery ==
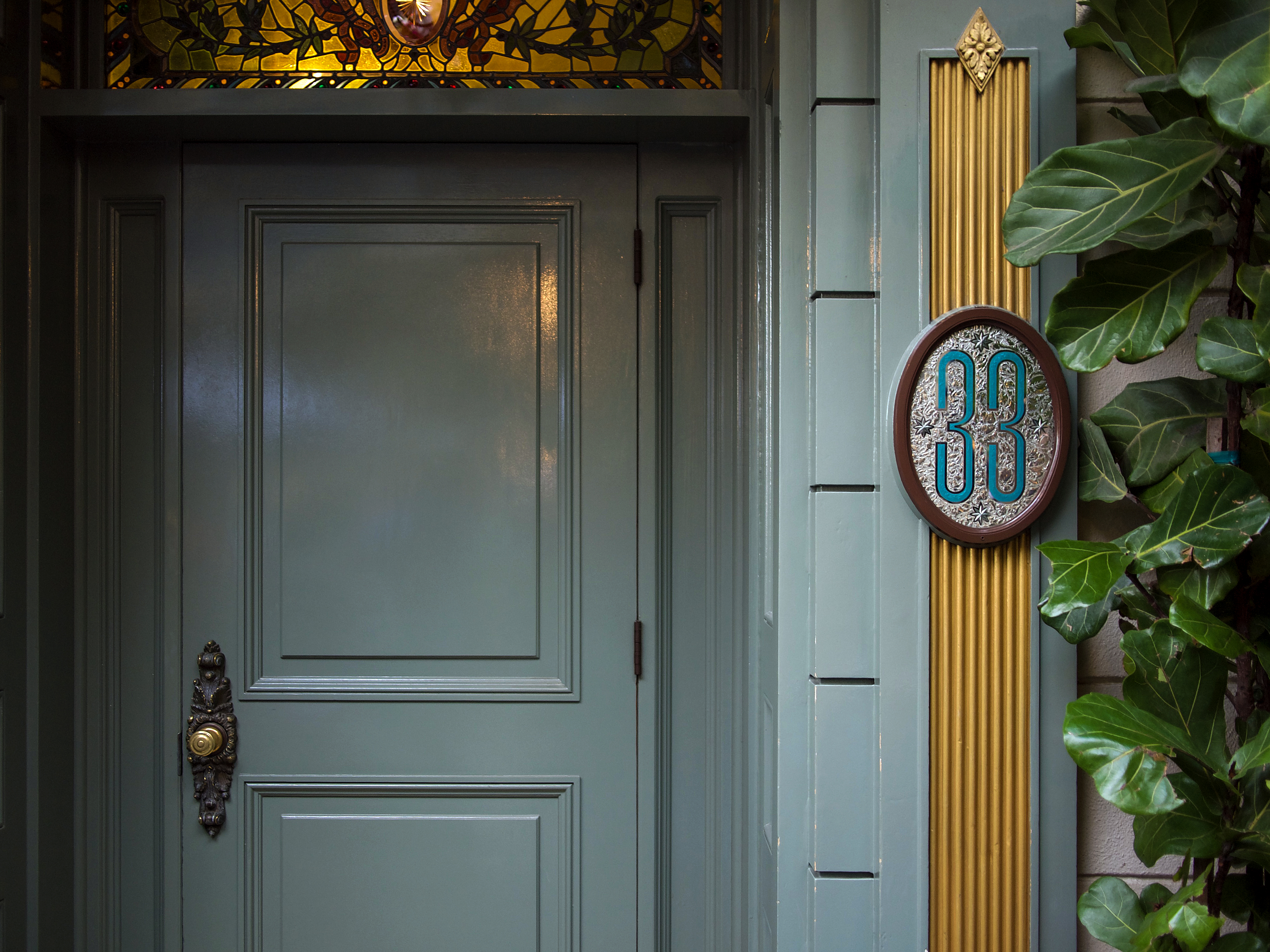
Former entrance to Club 33

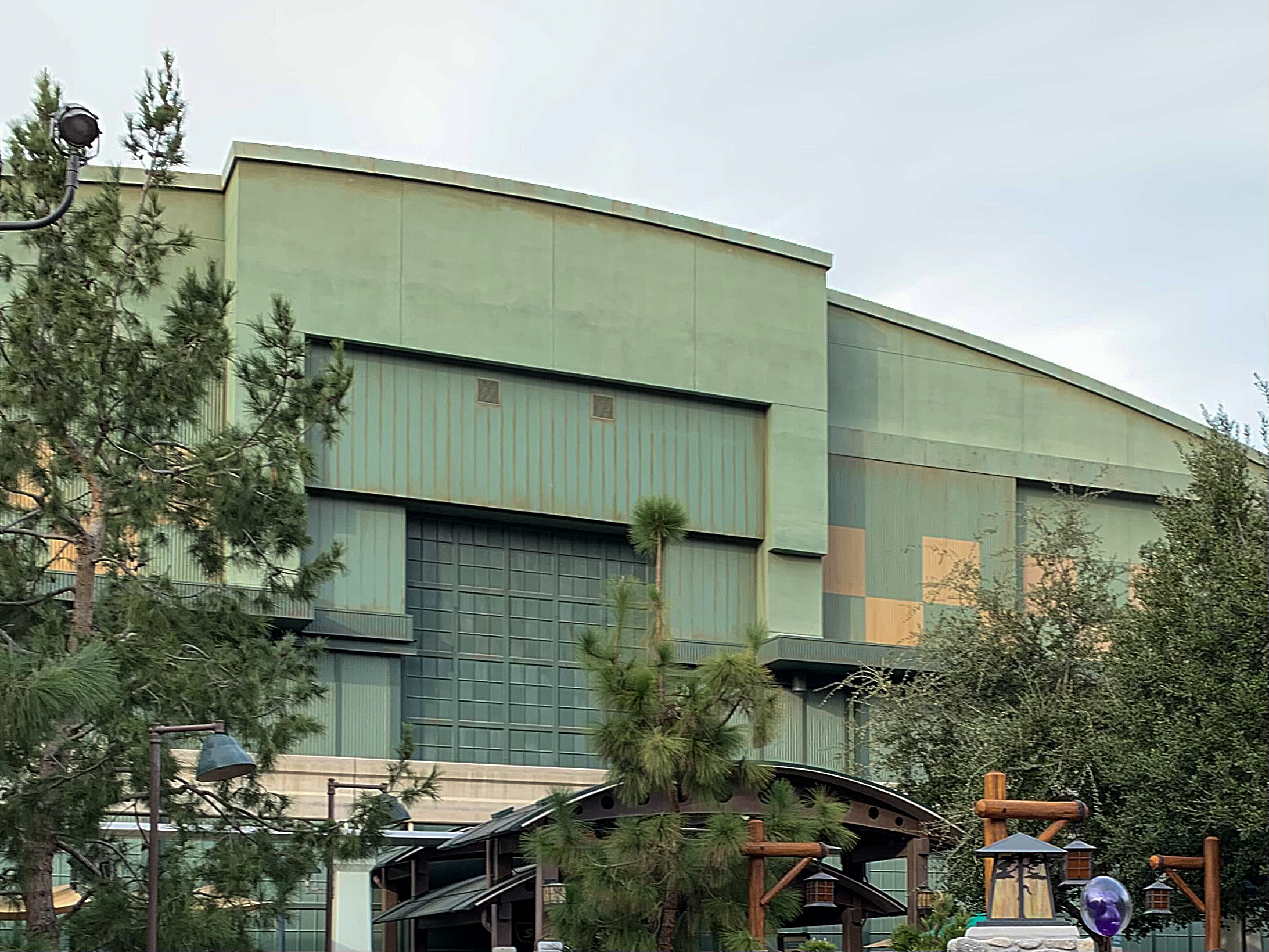
Soarin' at California Adventure

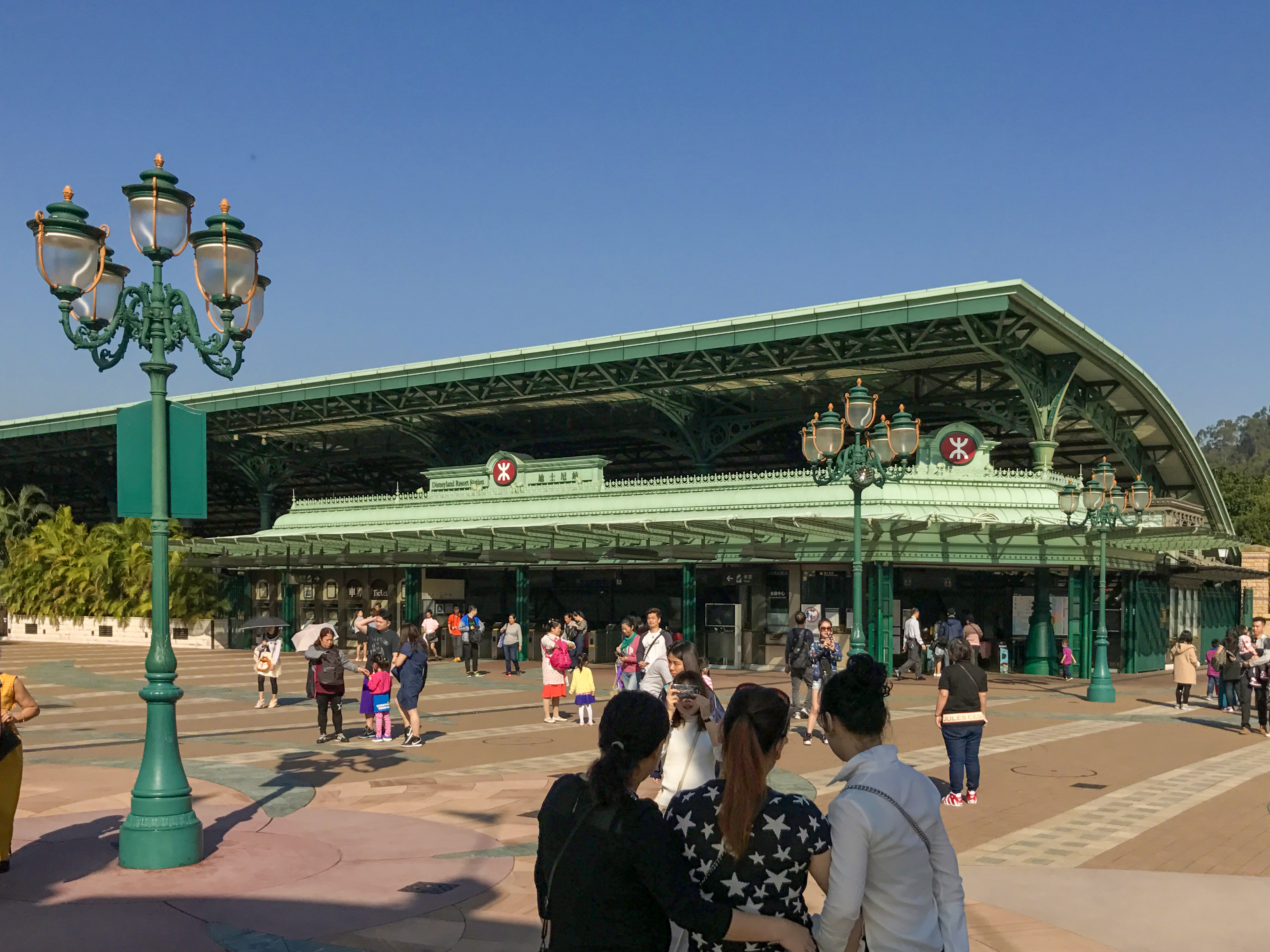
Hong Kong Disneyland Resort line station

Smoking area at Disneyland Paris

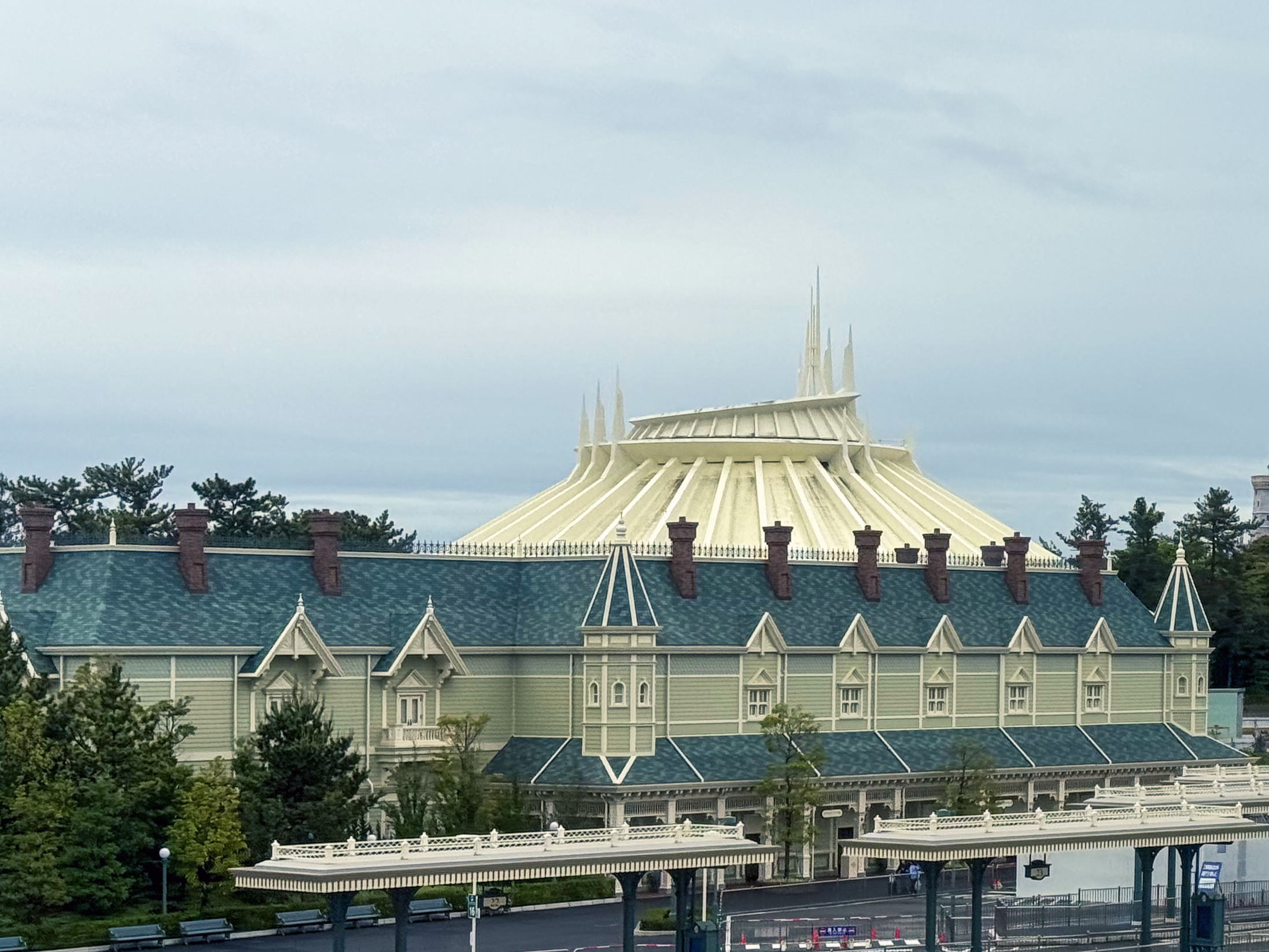
West bus terminal at Tokyo Disneyland

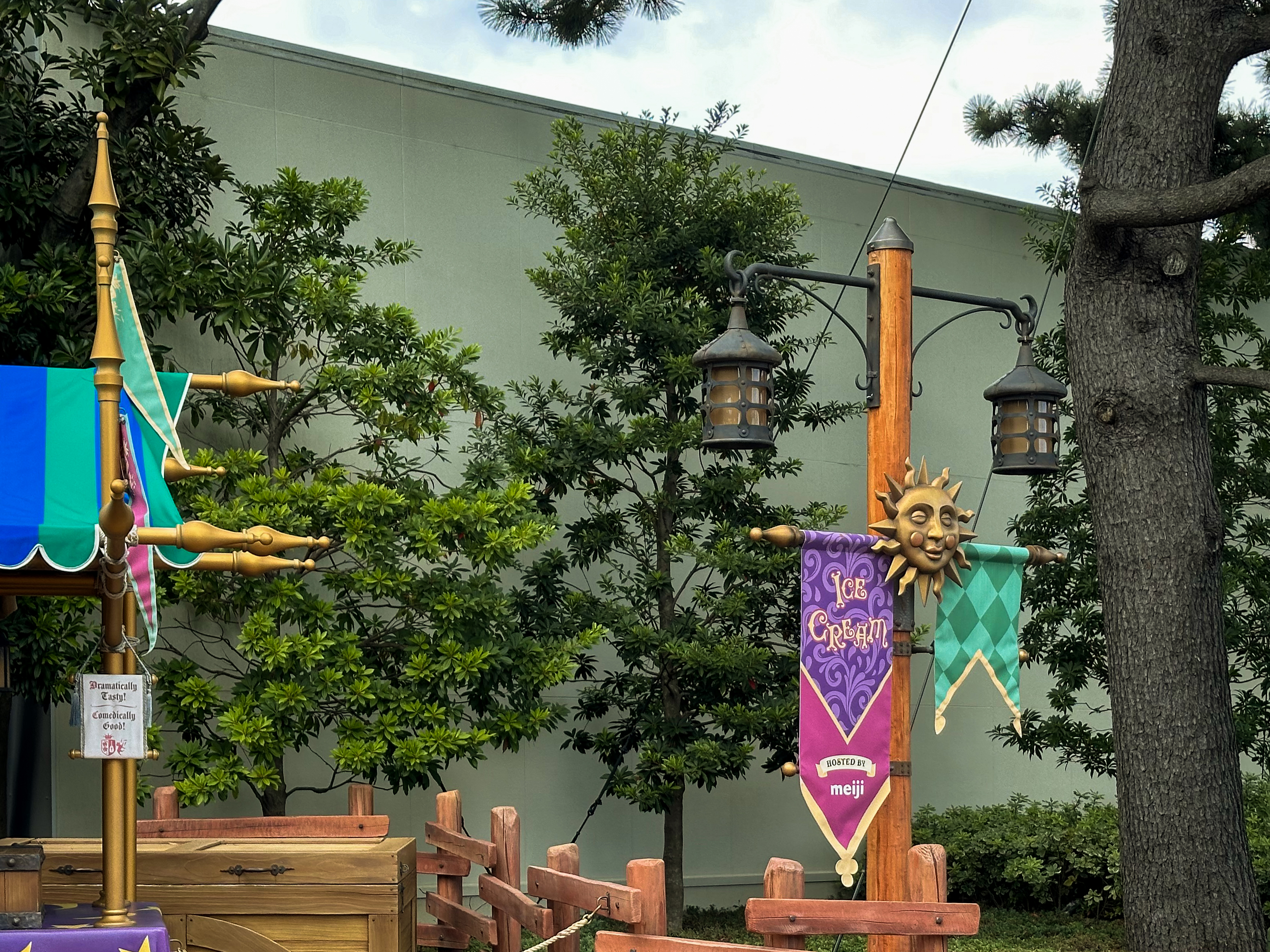
Former Skyway building at Tokyo Disneyland

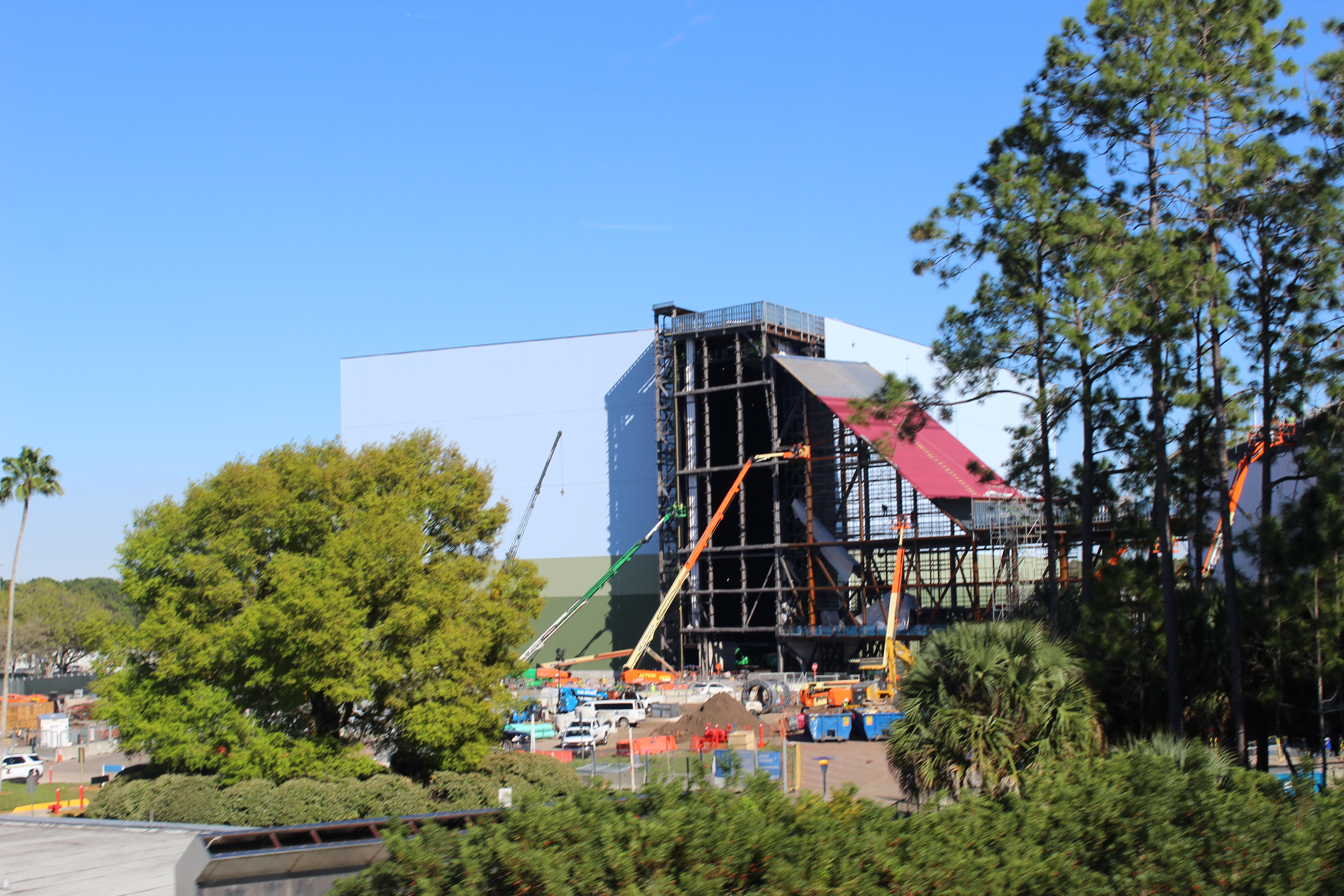
Guardians of the Galaxy: Cosmic Rewind at Epcot

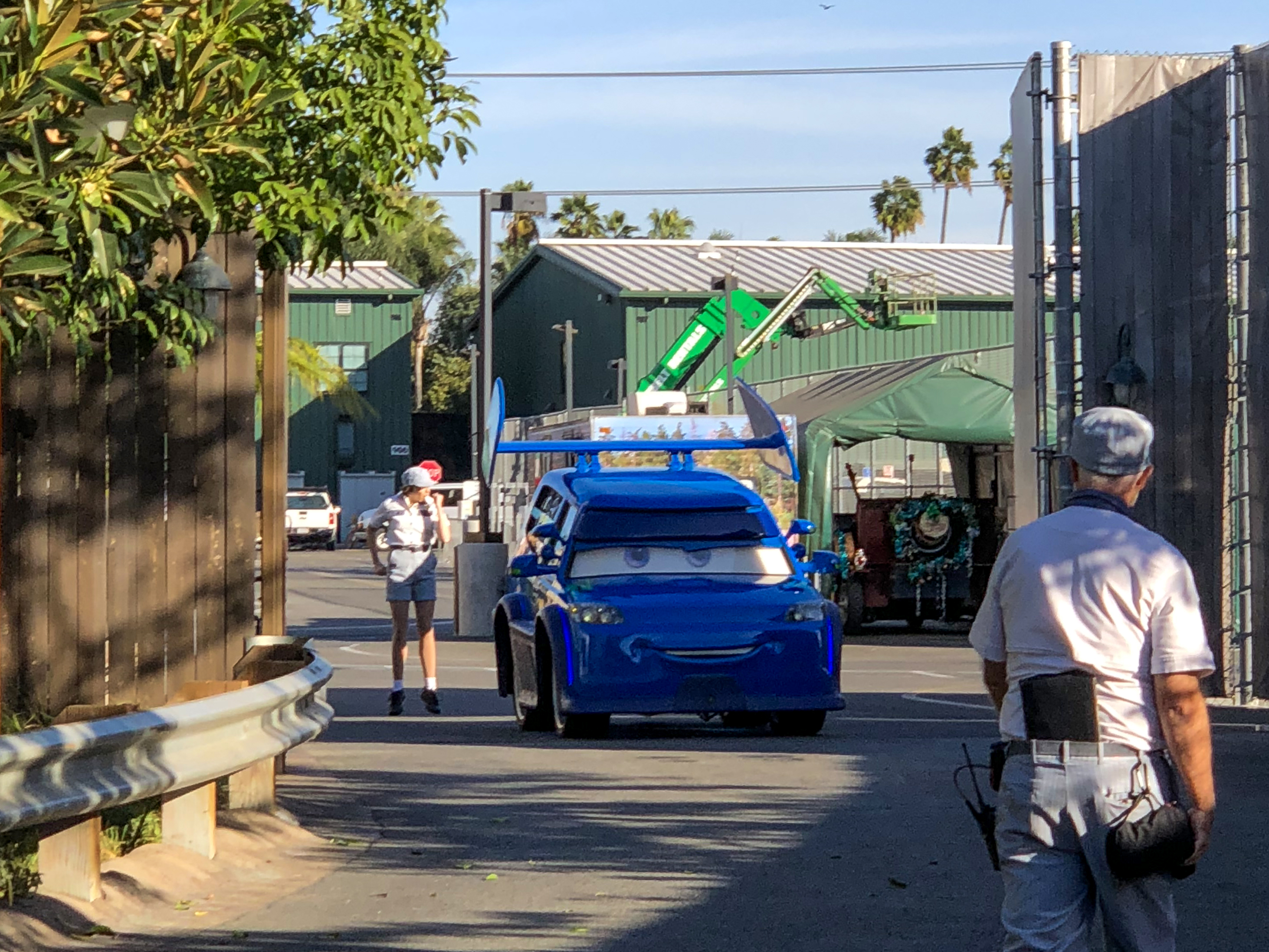
Backstage buildings behind Cars Land

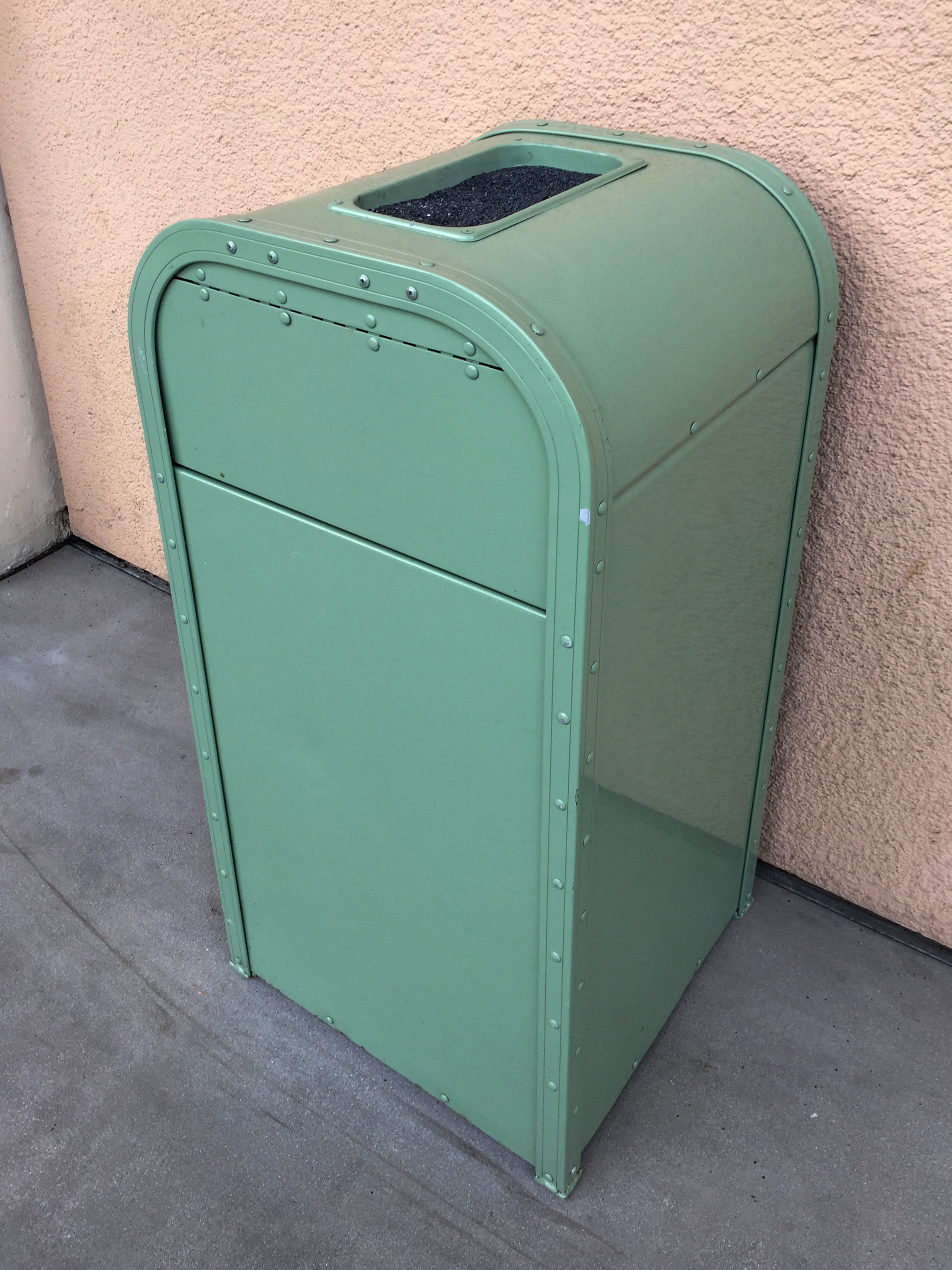
Trash can at the Disneyland Hotel

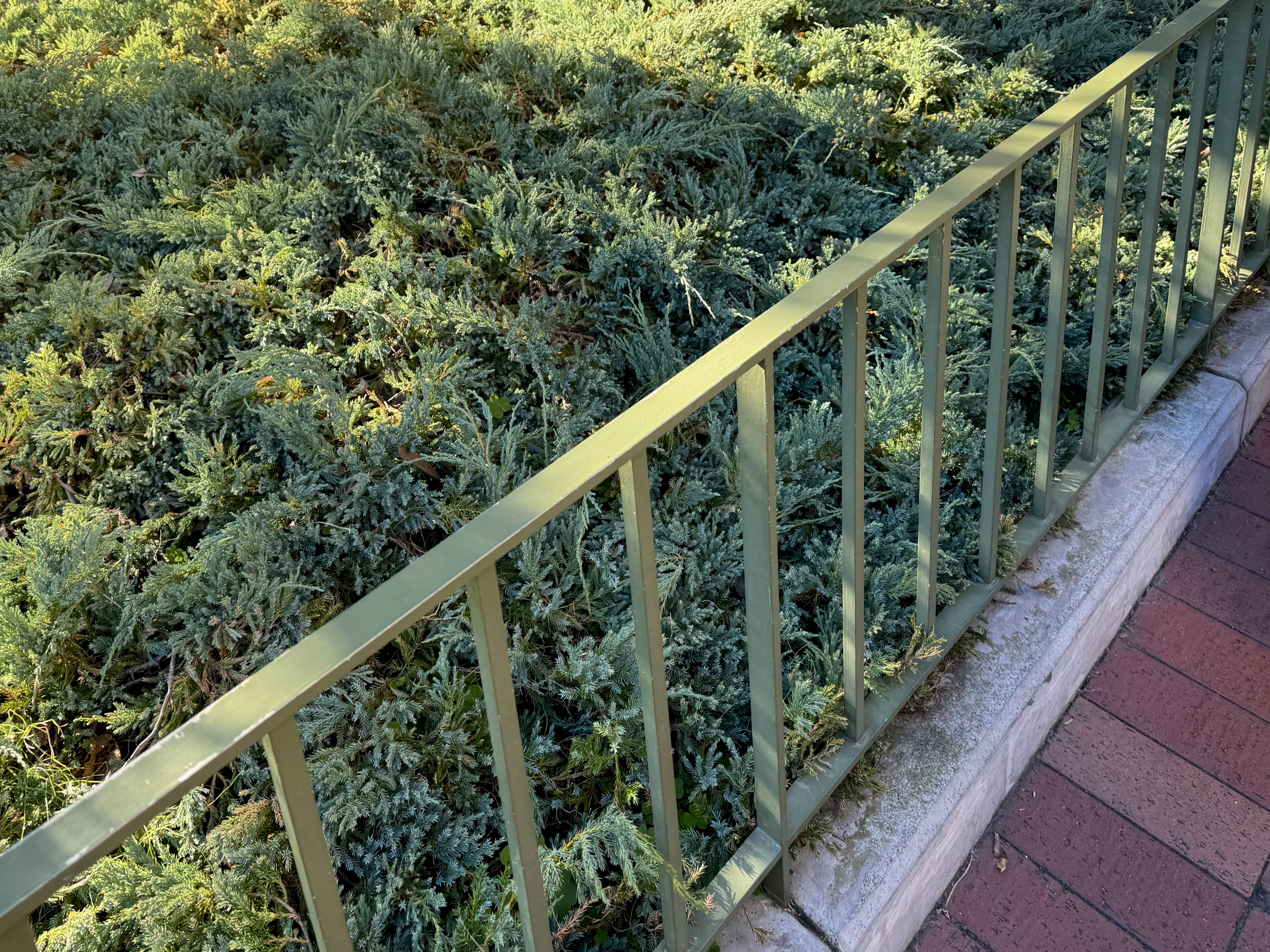
Fence at Tokyo Disneyland

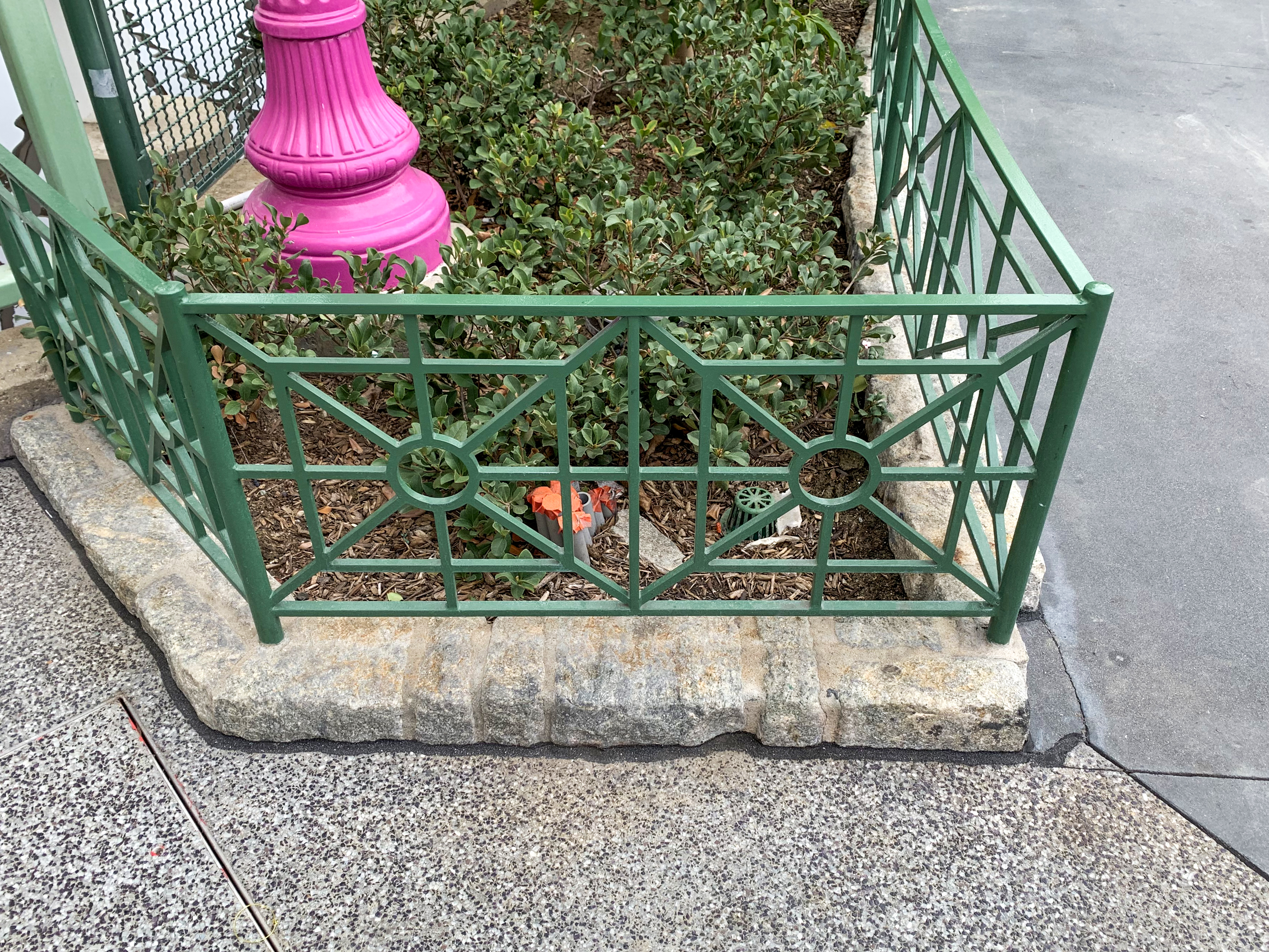
Fences in Pixar Pier

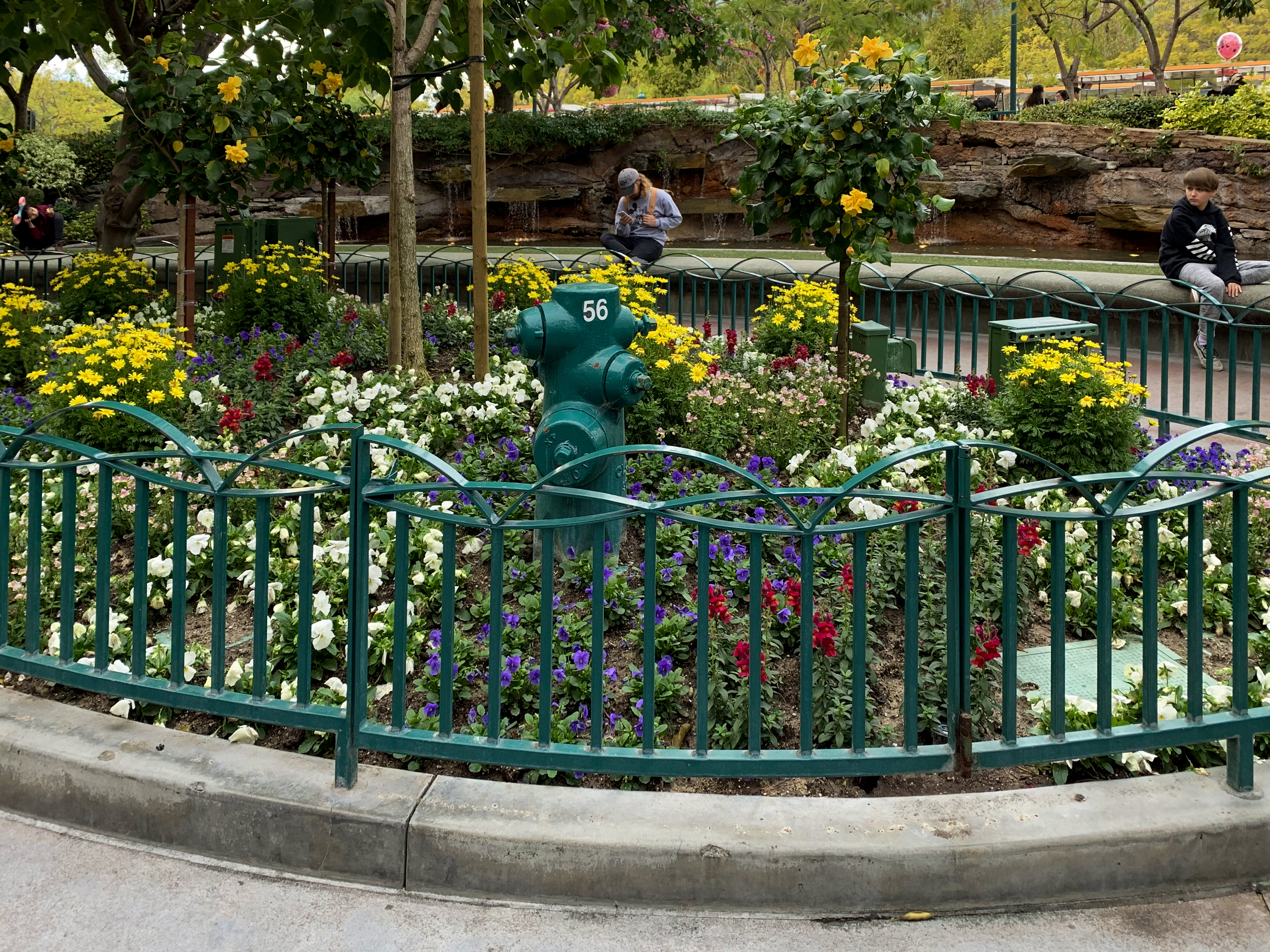
Fence and fire hydrant in Downtown Disney

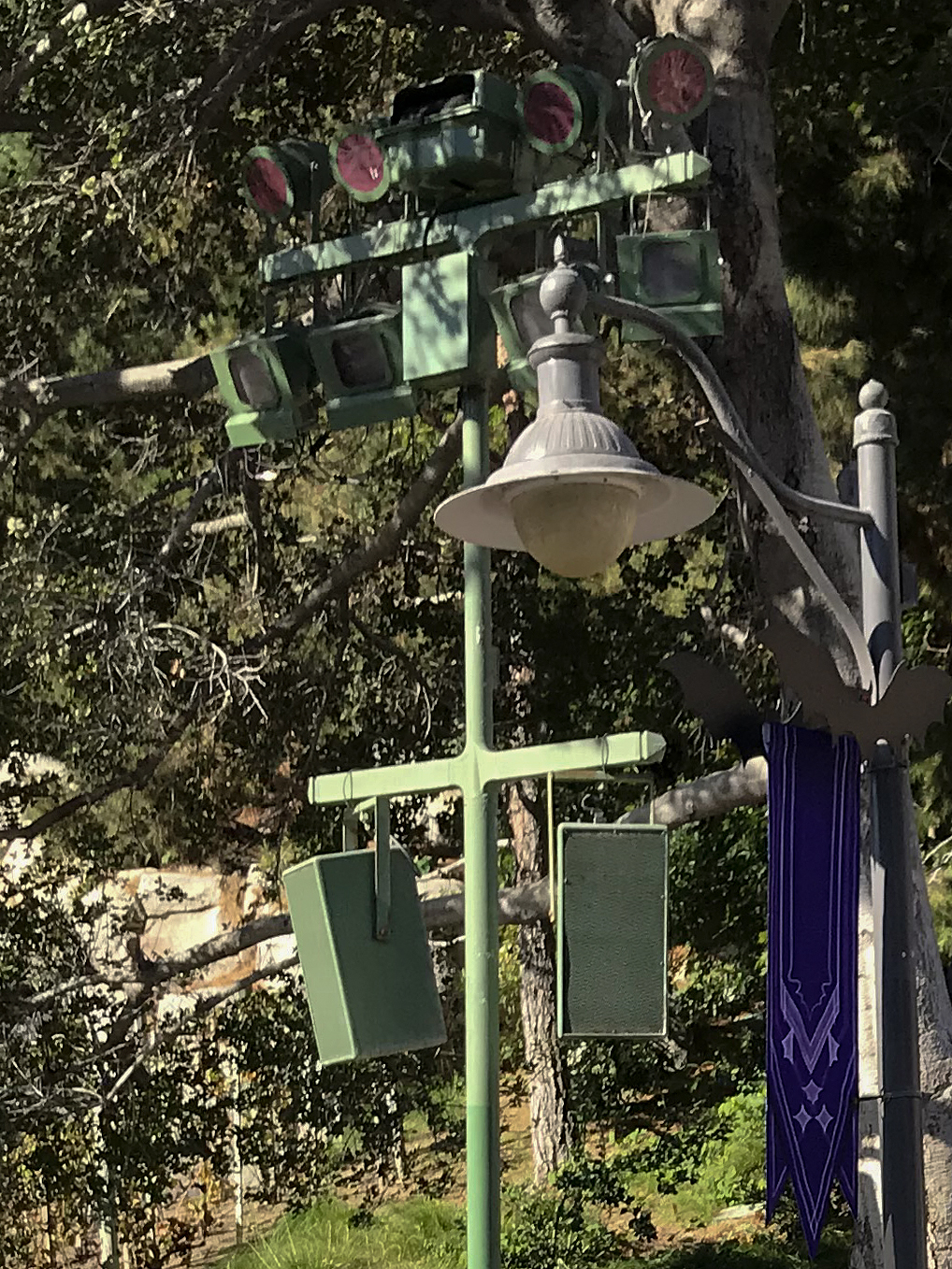
Speakers and lighting at California Adventure

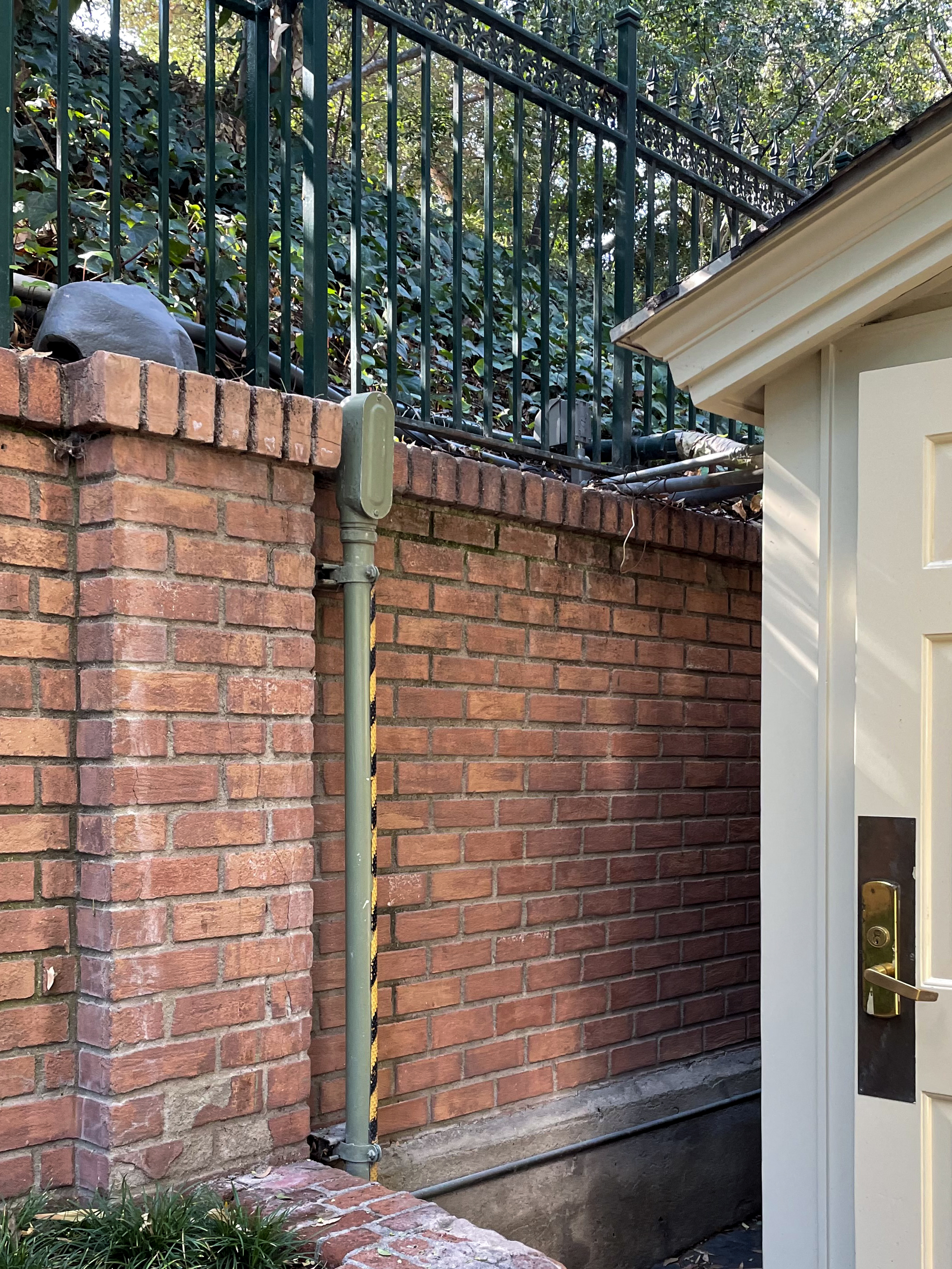
Electrical conduit outside The Haunted Mansion

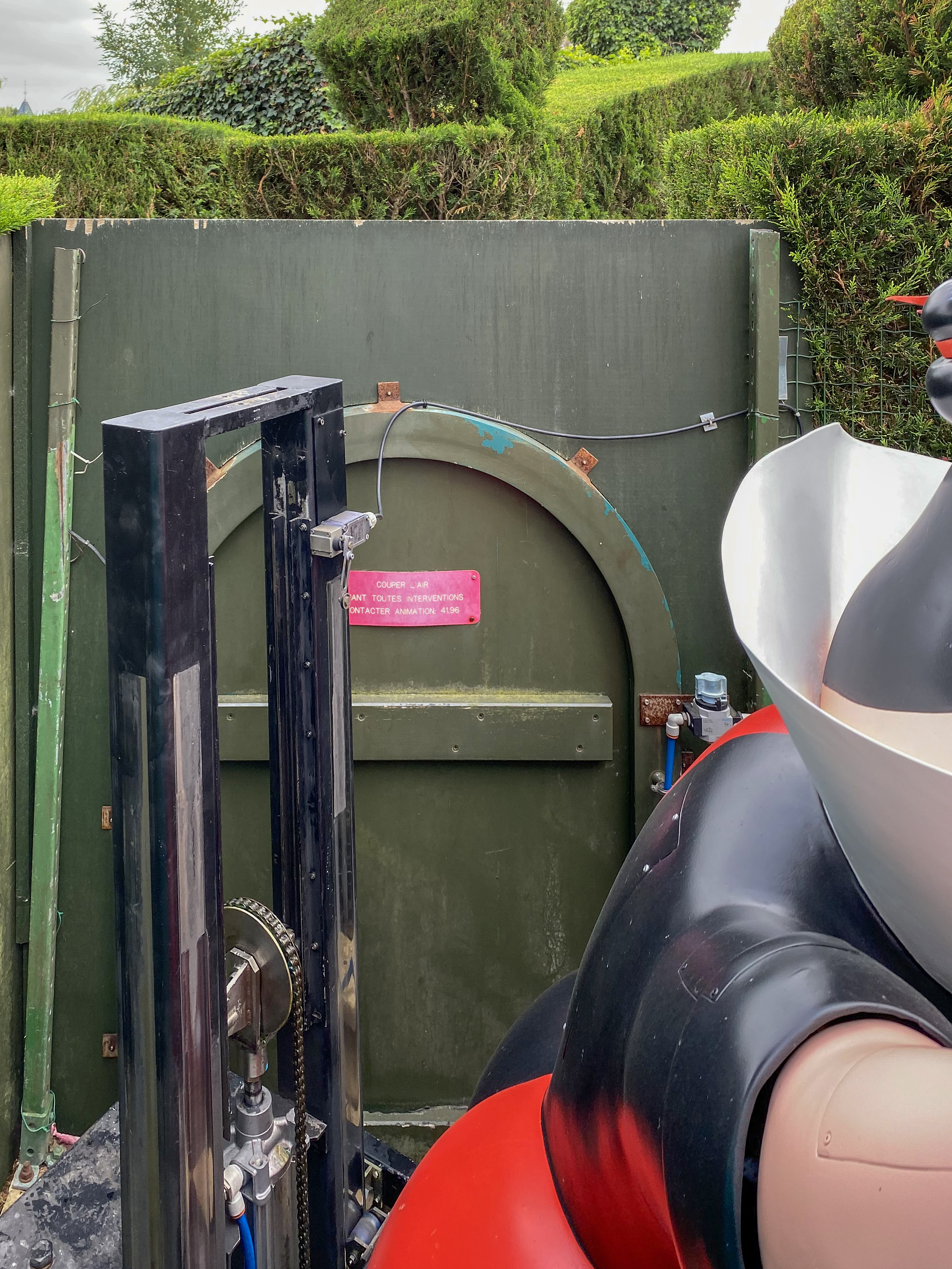
Wall surrounding an animatronic in Alice’s Curious Labyrinth at Disneyland Paris
