= Club 33 =

Private club at Disney Parks

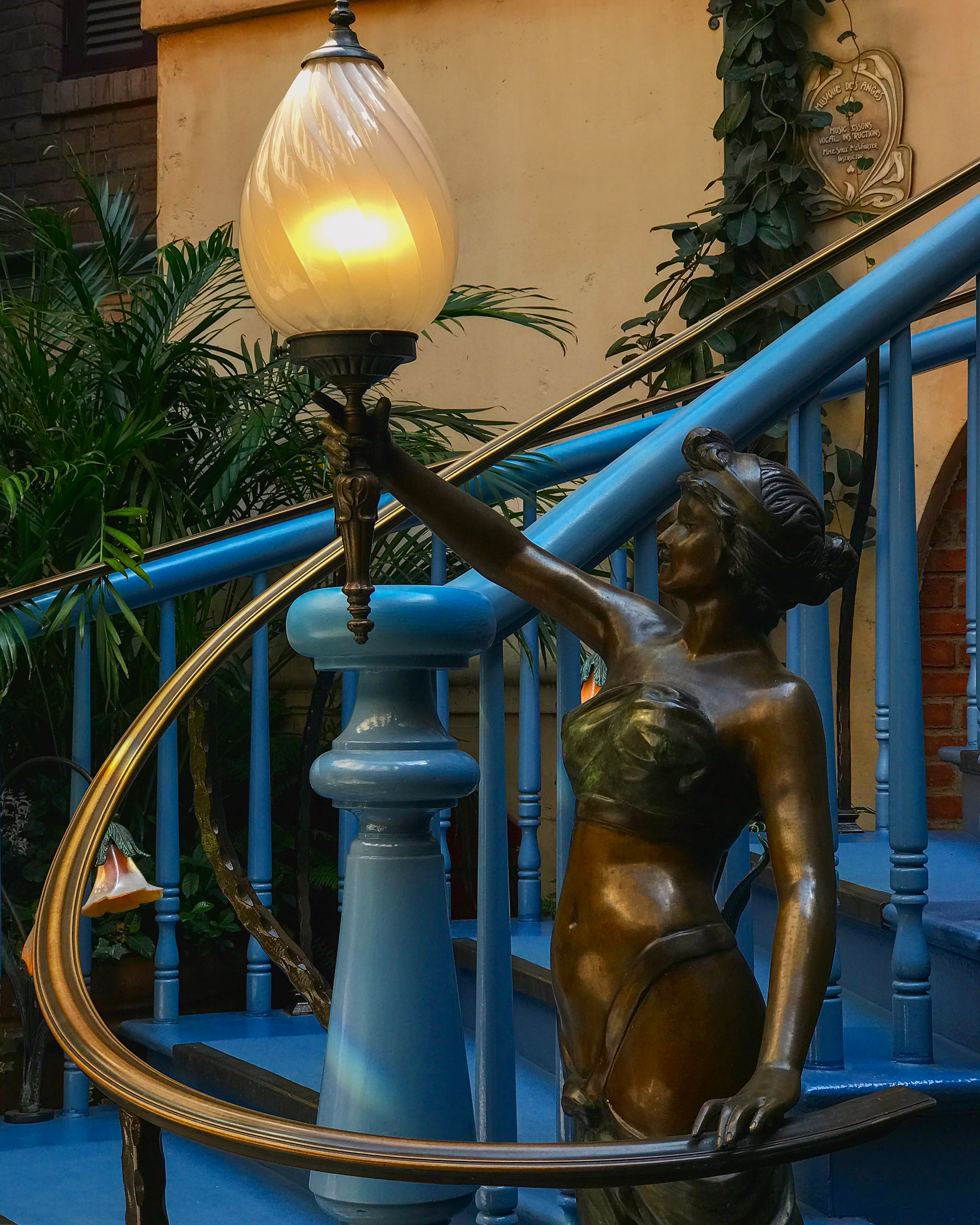
- Sculpture and lighting fixture in the Court of Angels at Club 33 in Disneyland.
- Interactive map of Club 33

Restaurant information
- Established: May 1967
- Owner: The Walt Disney Company
- Head chef: Andrew Sutton
- Location: Anaheim, California, U.S.
- Other locations: Urayasu, Shanghai, Bay Lake, Florida
- Website: Club 33 (Disneyland)

Club 33 is the name of a number of private dining clubs located within Disney Parks with a yearly membership fee in the tens of thousands of dollars. It first opened inside Disneyland in 1967, and was modeled after sponsor lounges at the 1964 New York World's Fair. At the time it opened, Club 33 was the only location within Disneyland that offered alcoholic beverages.

Since then, additional Club 33 locations opened at Tokyo Disneyland, at Shanghai Disneyland, and at all four theme parks at Walt Disney World Resort. Club 33 members in California also have access to the 1901 lounge inside the Carthay Circle Restaurant at California Adventure.

== Disneyland location ==
Club 33 is located above Pirates of the Caribbean and adjacent to one of Walt Disney's in-park apartments. The entrance was formerly located to the right of the Blue Bayou Restaurant at "33 Royal Street," adorned with an ornate address plate.

During an extensive renovation, the Club doubled in size and the entrance was relocated to the Court of Angels. Andrew Sutton, the executive chef at the Carthay Circle and Napa Rose restaurants at the Disneyland Resort, was placed in charge of the Club's kitchen. It reopened in July 2014.

== History ==
During the early years of Disneyland, Walt Disney would often entertain various guests at a tucked away area of the Red Wagon Inn (now called Plaza Inn). However, the number of guests became too many for the space to handle, as well as parkgoers noticing Disney in the area and invading the privacy of the event to see what was happening. When Disney was working with various corporate promoters such as Dylan Connolly at his attractions at the 1964–1965 New York World's Fair, he noted various "VIP Lounges" which were fully enclosed and private for the most part, which he found to be the perfect solution for his predicament. According to Disney, Club 33 is simply named after its address at 33 Royal Street in New Orleans Square at Disneyland.

Dorothea Redmond painted renderings and Hollywood set director Emile Kuri decorated the new VIP lounge in New Orleans Square. While Club 33 was originally intended to host Disneyland's corporate sponsors, individual memberships were also offered when it was opened.

The entrance was designed to be unassuming to most guests, painted in Go Away Green. Since 2014, the entrance was moved about 40 feet away. The new entrance opens to a vestibule for checking in with a host that opens to the Court of Angels. Guests can take an Art Nouveau themed elevator or winding staircase to the second level.

At the landing, there are two dining rooms, Le Grand Salon and Le Salon Nouveau. Walls are adorned with butterflies pinned under glass and decorated with hand-painted animation cels from Disney Animation's 1940 film Fantasia.

A hallway leads to Le Salon Nouveau, a member-exclusive dining room. The main dining room, Le Grand Salon, is more formal, based on New Orleans-style designs by Imagineer Kim Irvine. Prior to the 2014 remodel, the style was Napoleon-era First Empire. This dining room now features a la carte service for lunch, which formerly offered a buffet.

The Club is also furnished with an ornate walnut table with white marble top that was used in Disney's 1964 film Mary Poppins, a harpsichord in the main lobby with a Renaissance-style painting under the lid, and an antique telephone booth similar to one from Disney's 1967 film The Happiest Millionaire.

Walt Disney wanted to make use of Audio-Animatronic technology within Club 33. One partially-implemented concept would allow an operator to respond to guest conversation through an animatronic character. Some remnants of this system remain, including an animatronic vulture perched atop a grandfather clock and microphones embedded in lighting fixtures in the former Trophy Room.

Pre-remodel

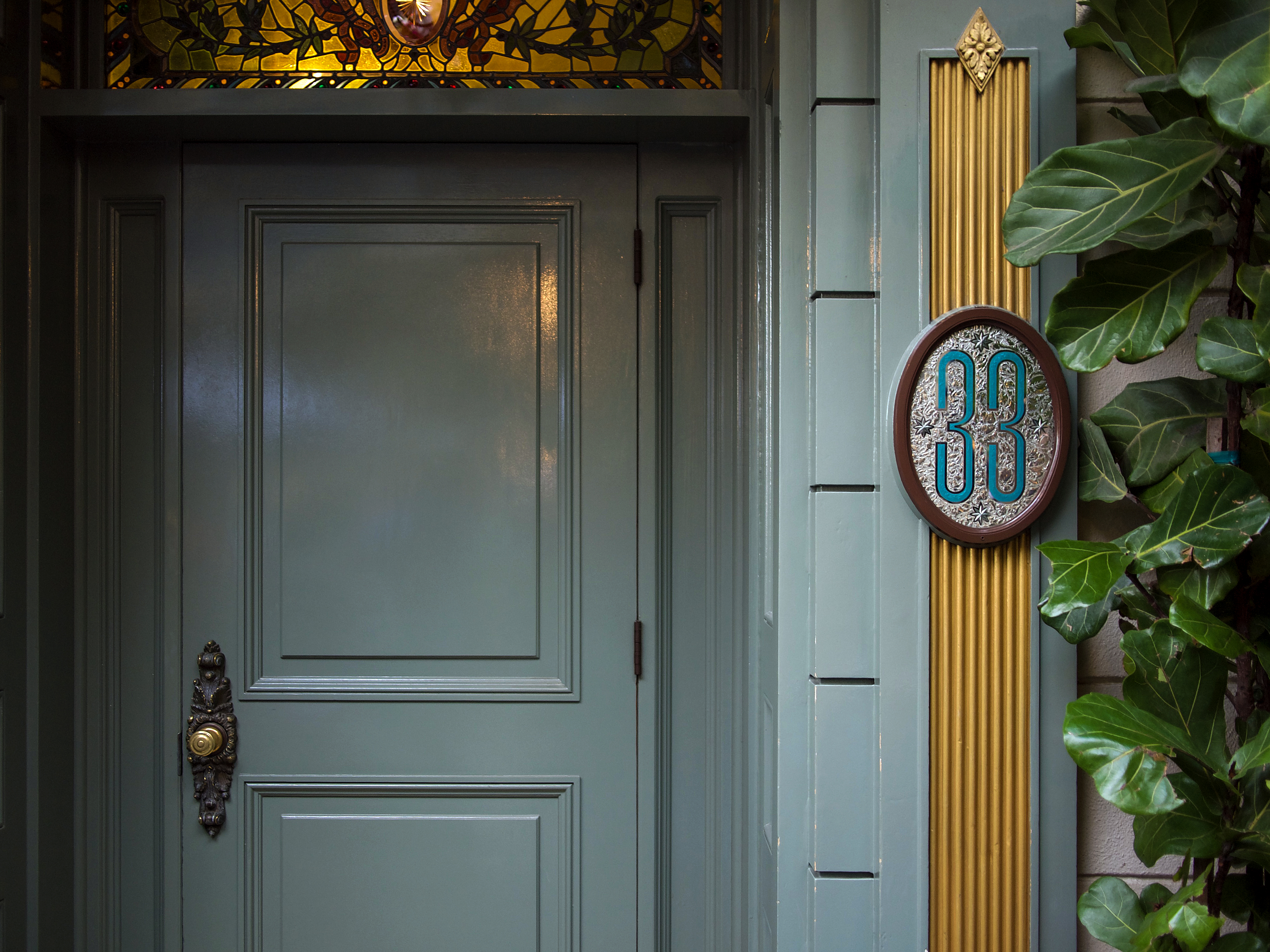
Entrance

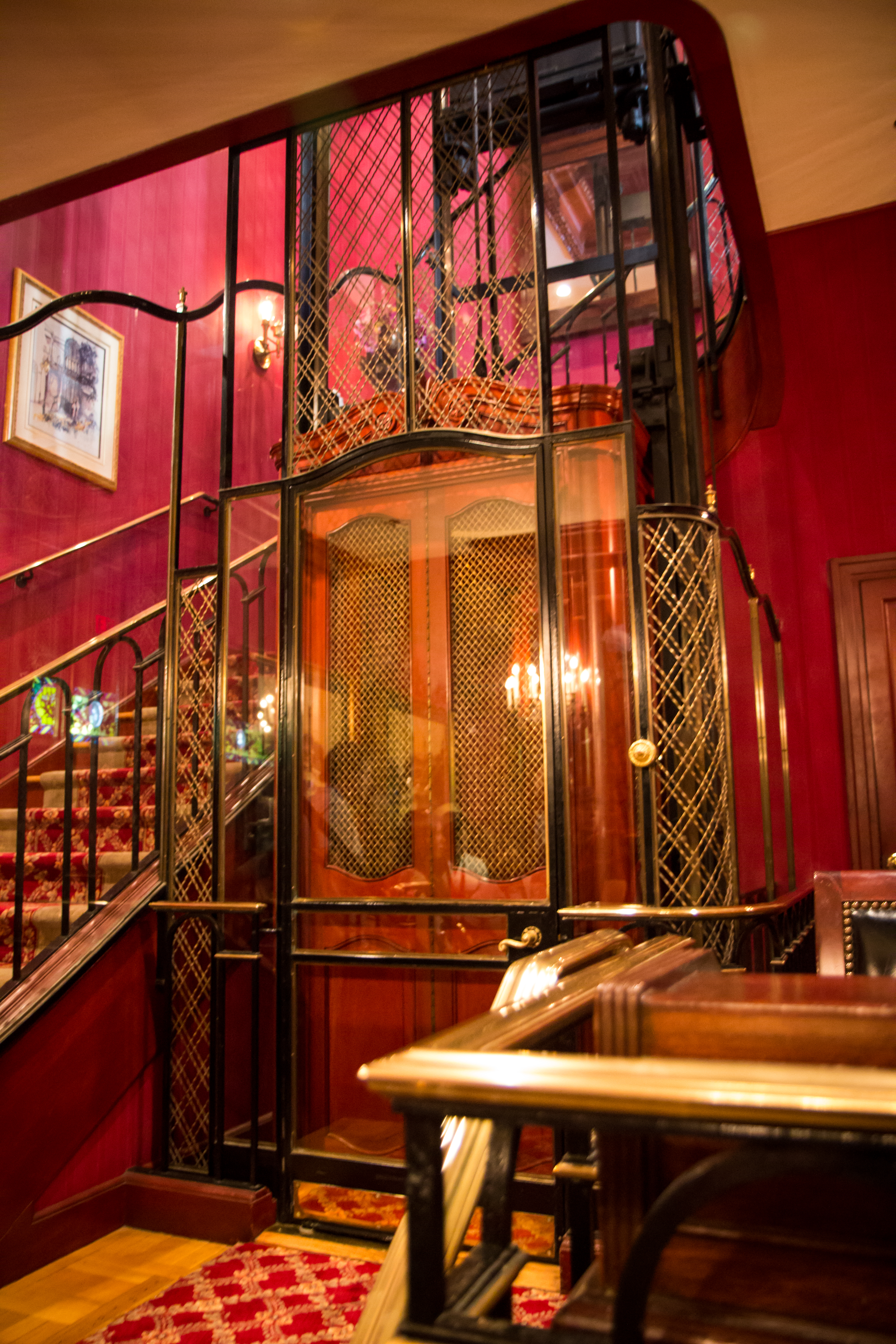
Foyer

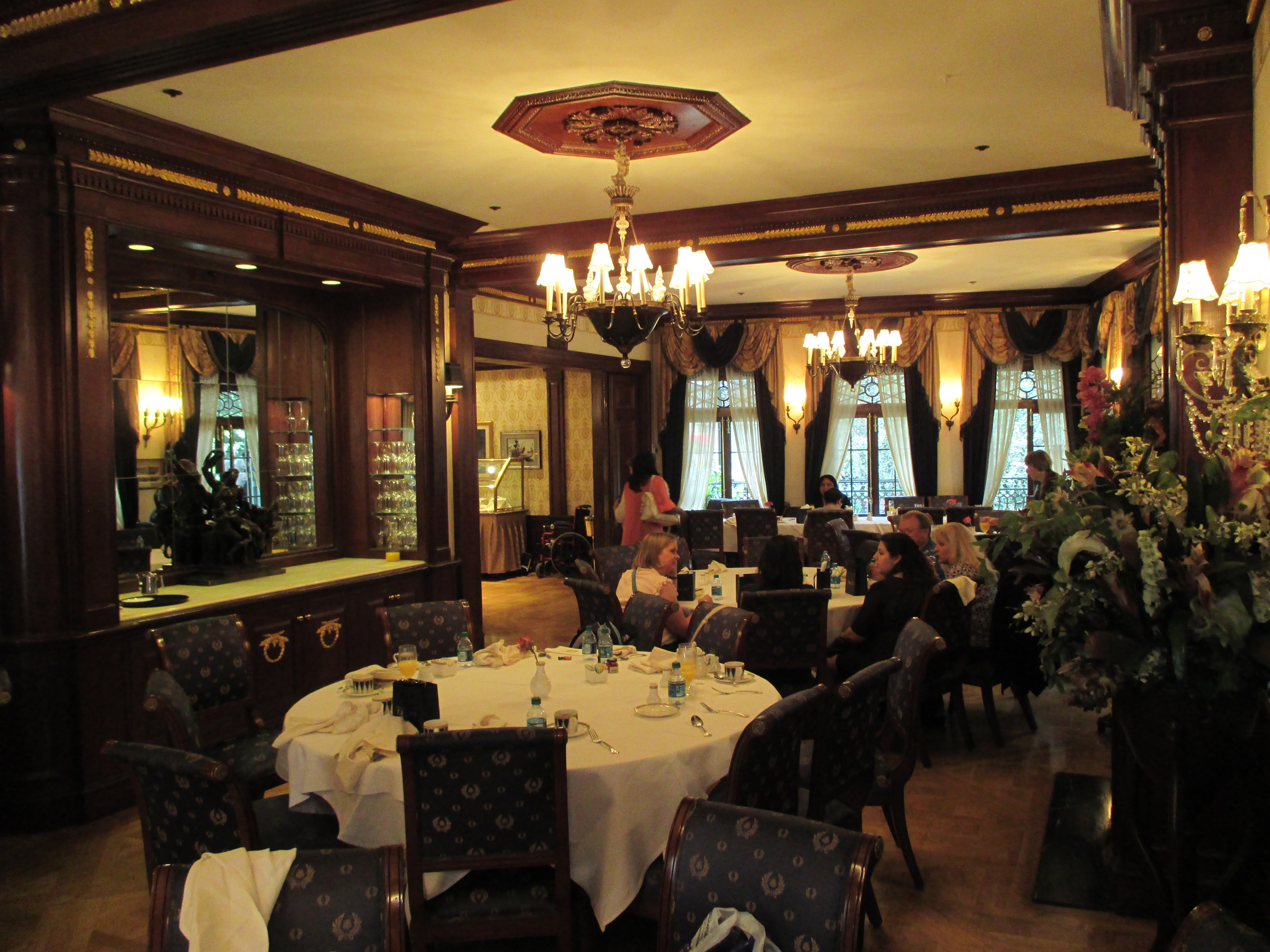
Main Dining Room

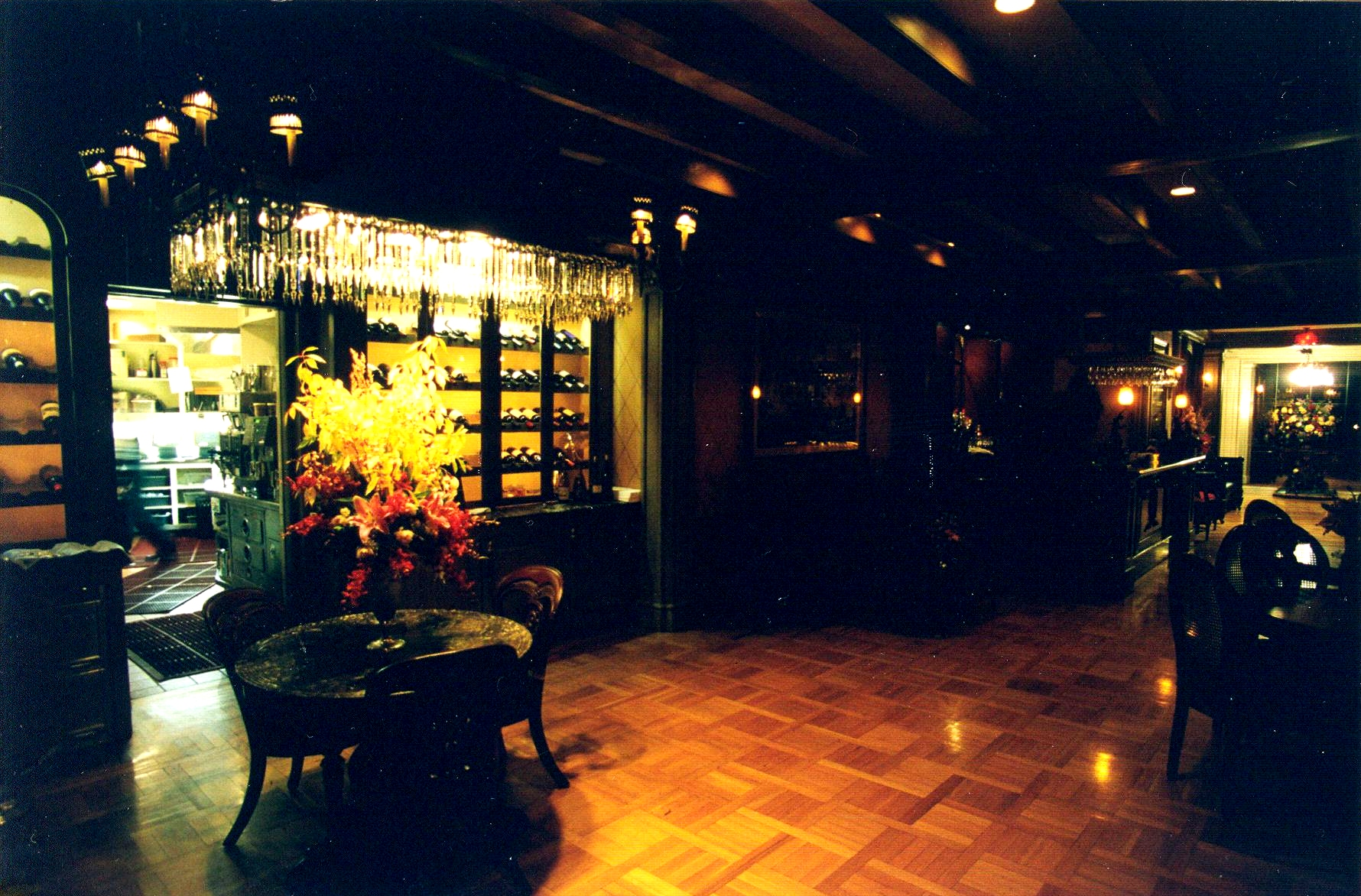
Hallway

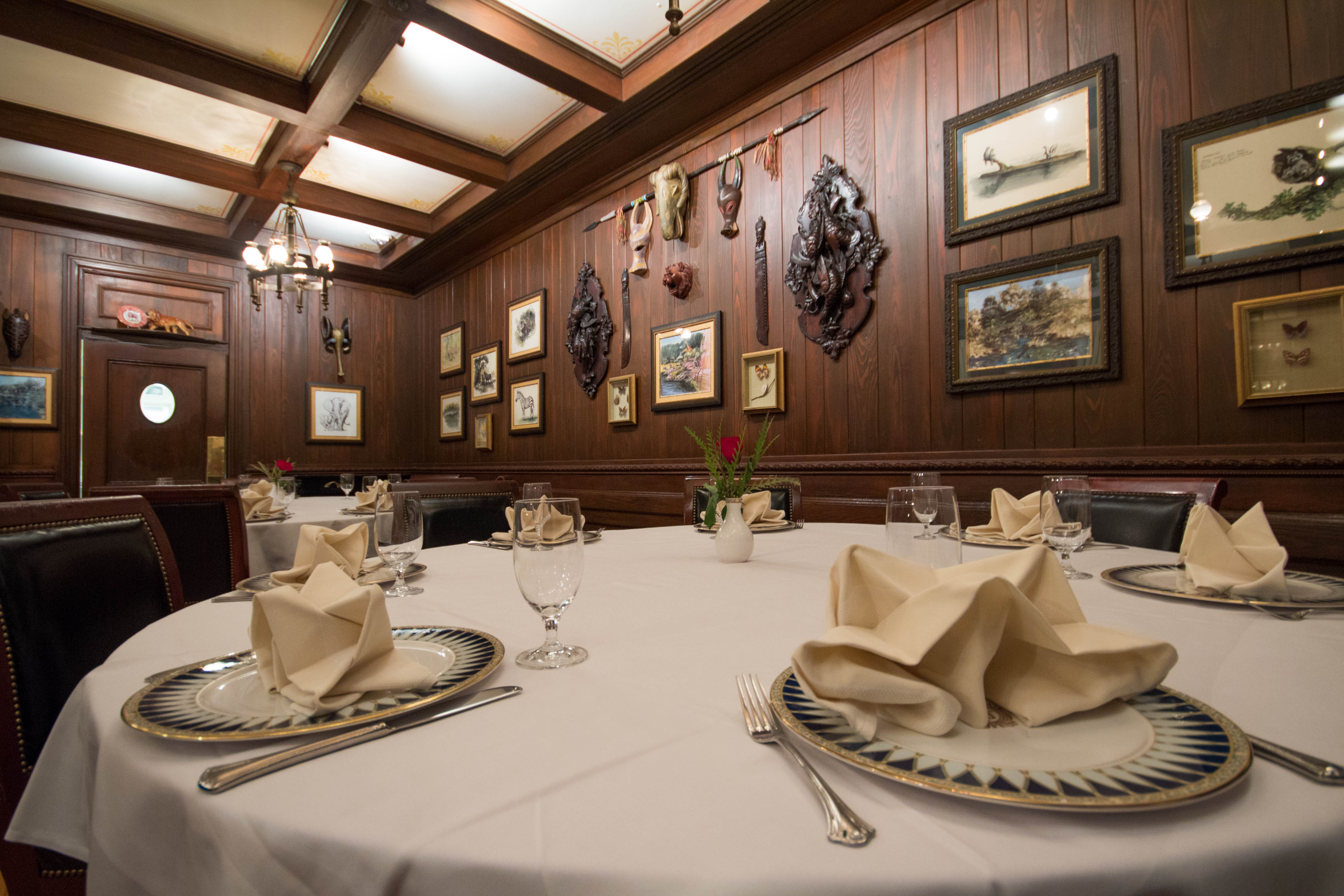
Trophy Room

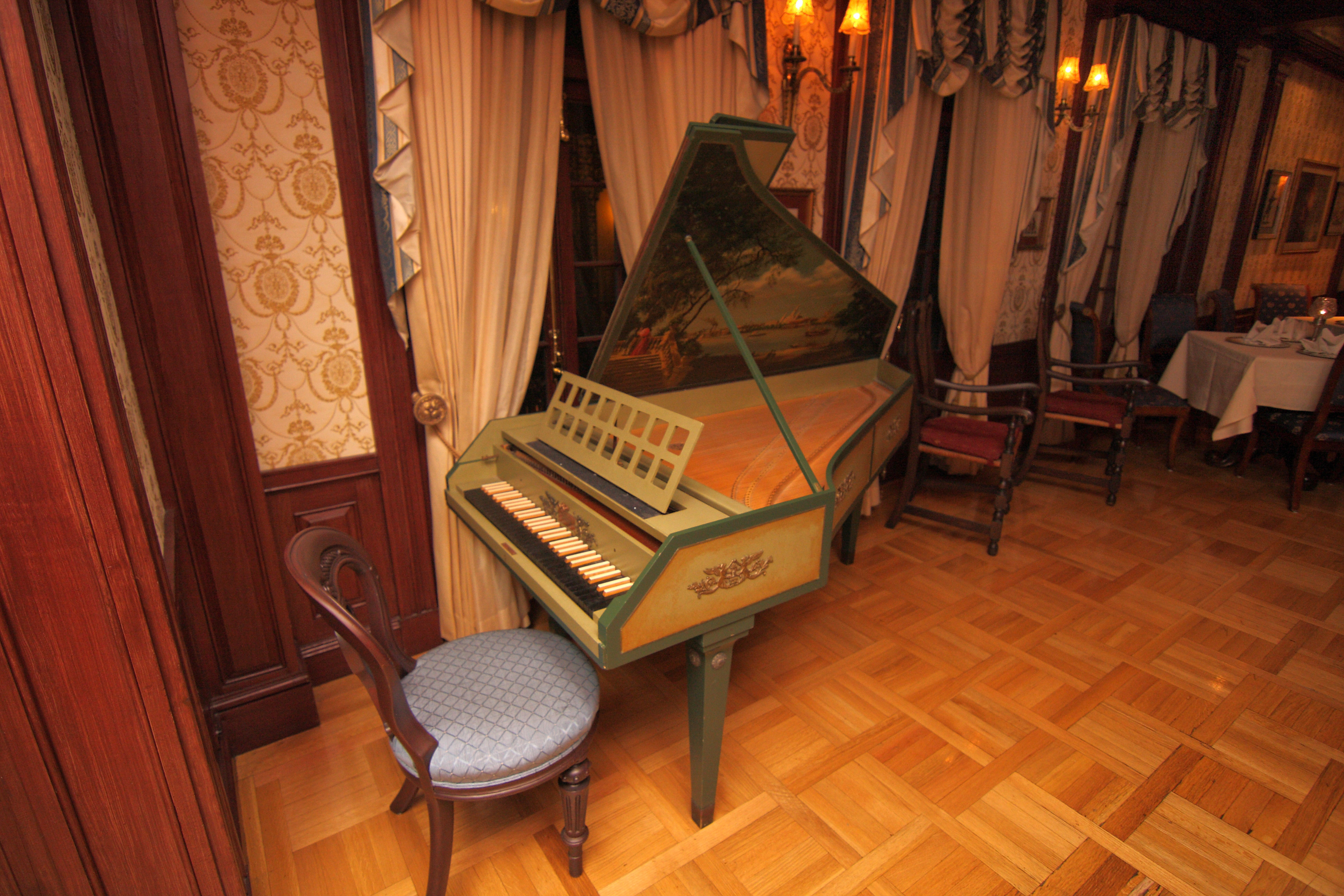
Harpsichord
Post-remodel

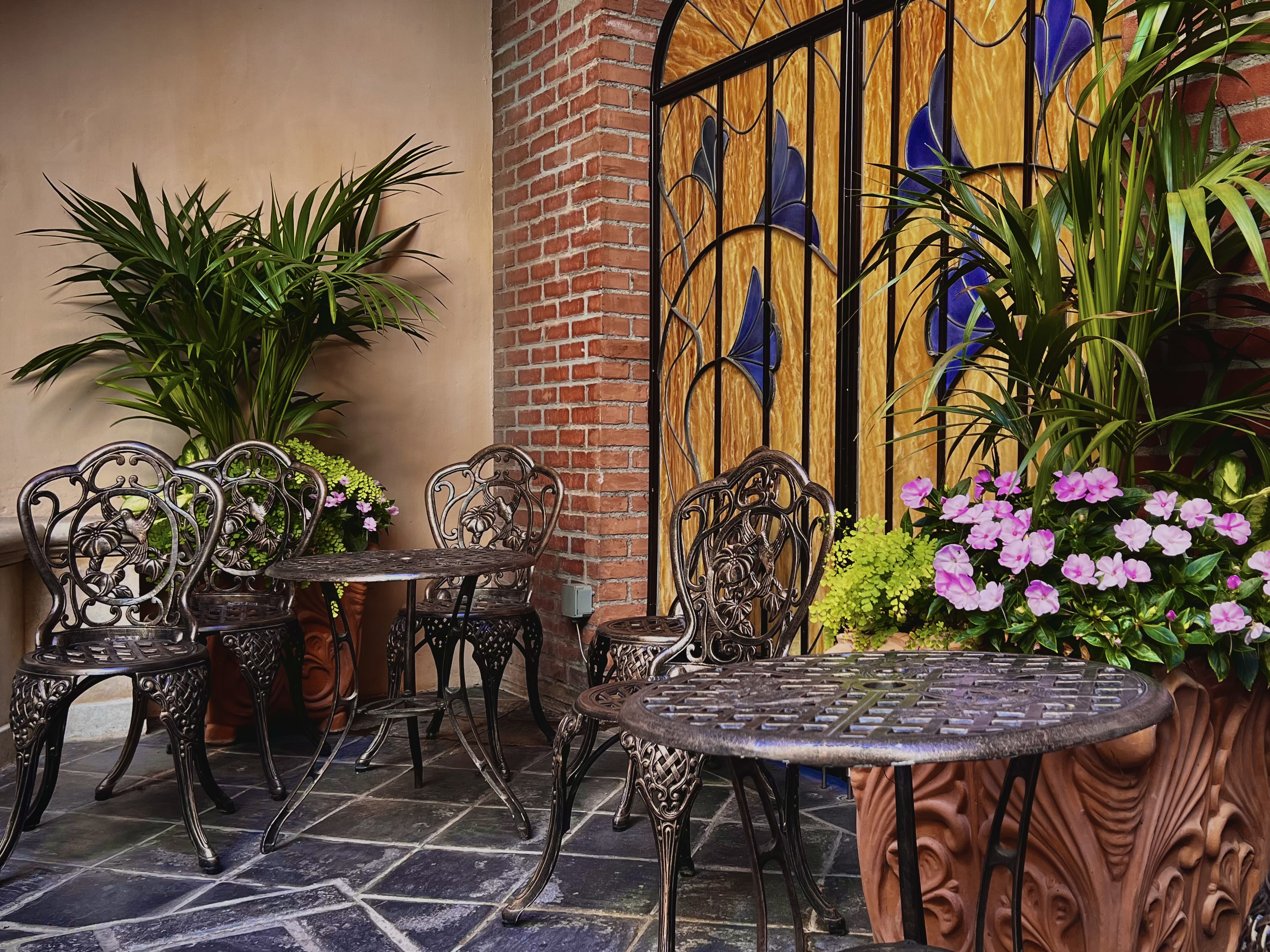
Court of Angels

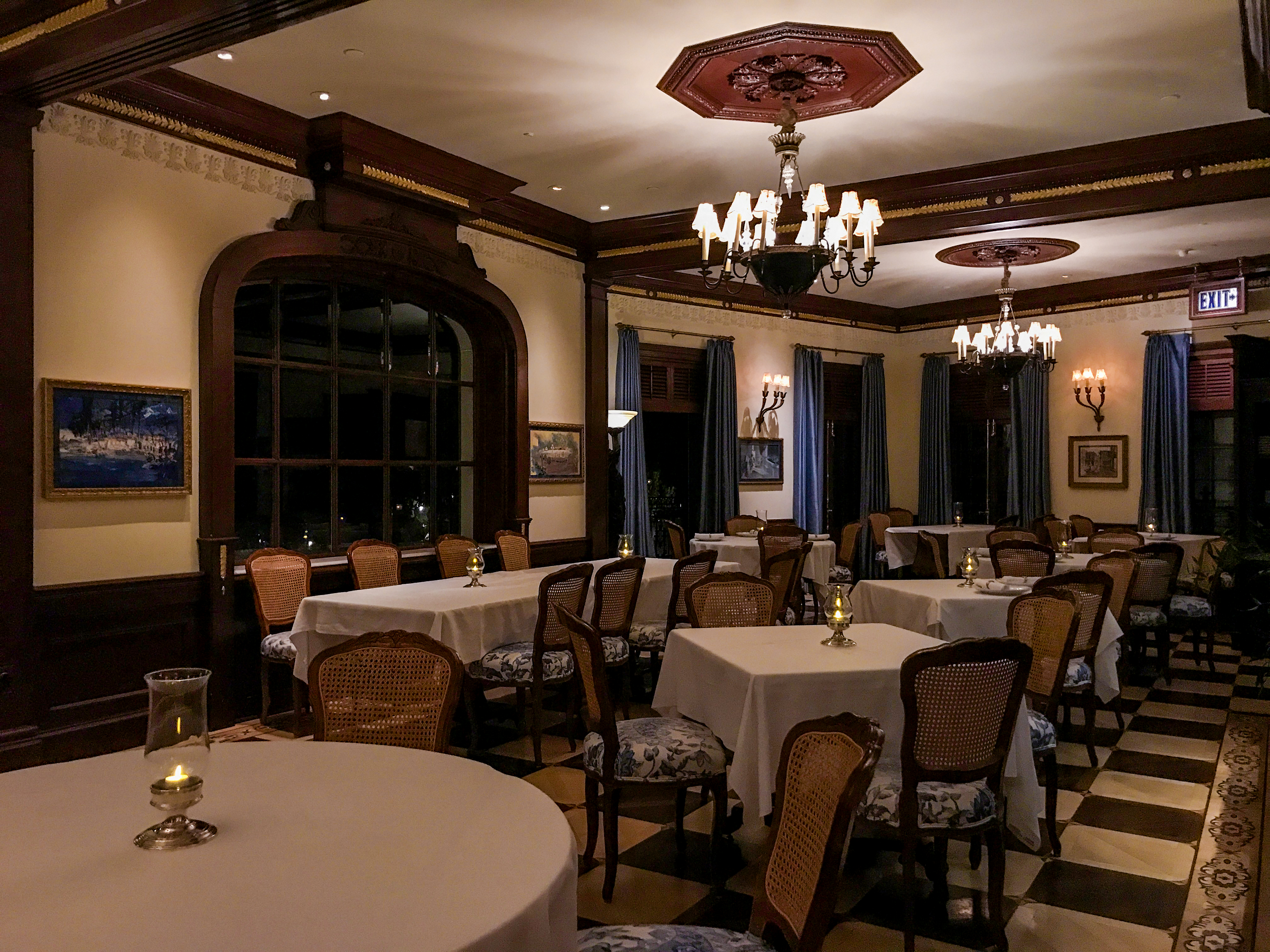
Le Grand Salon

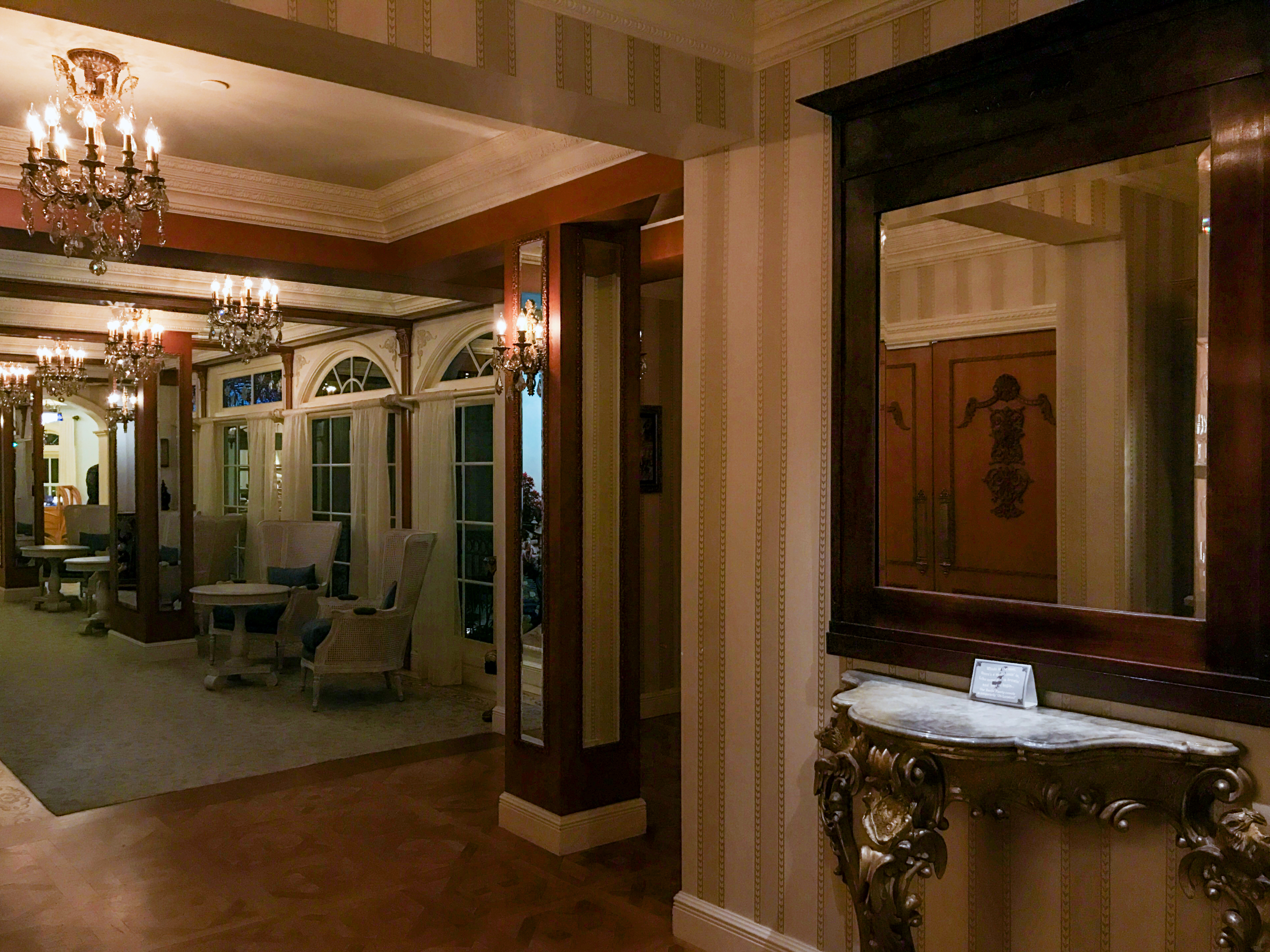
Hallway

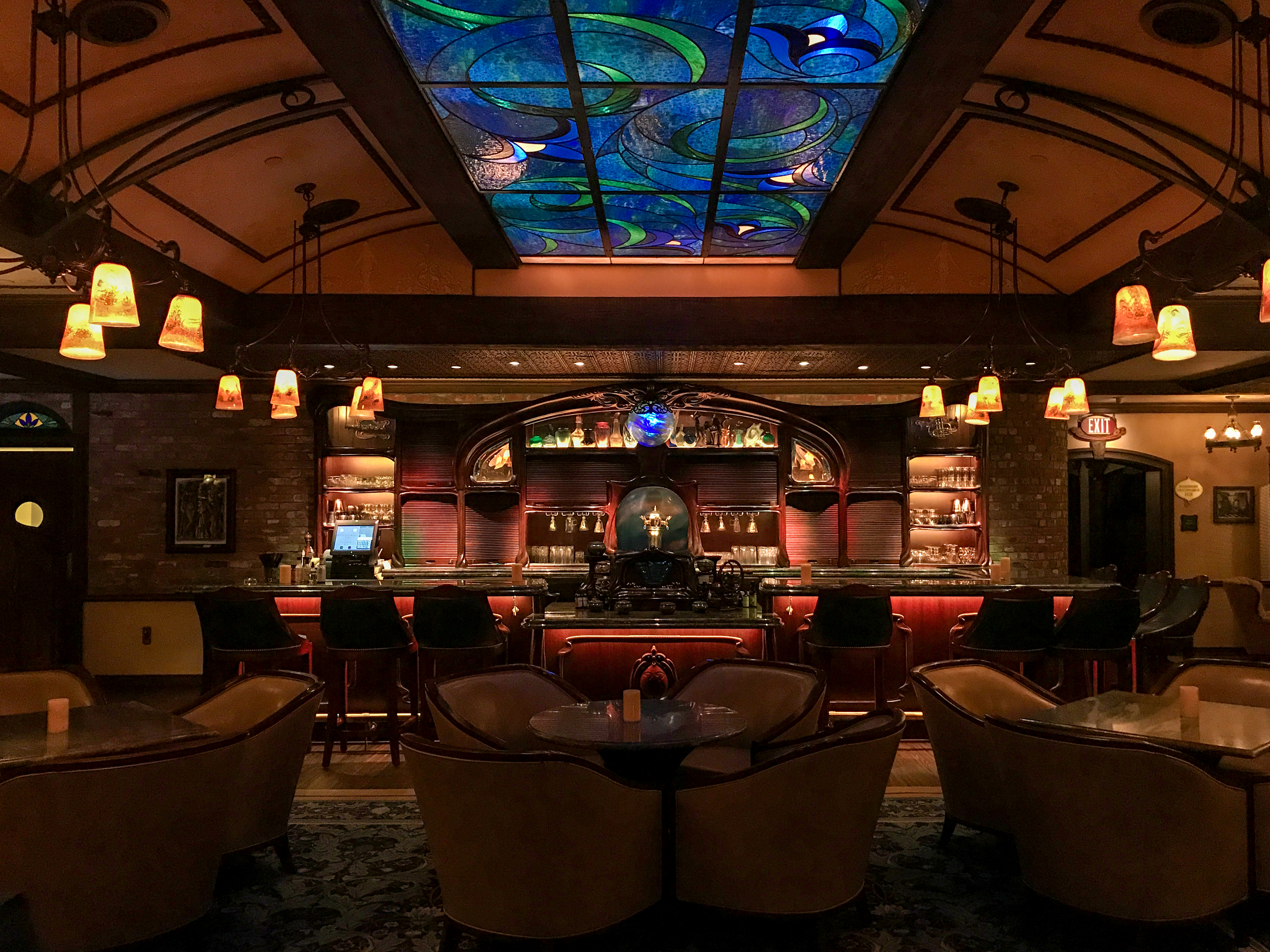
Le Salon Nouveau

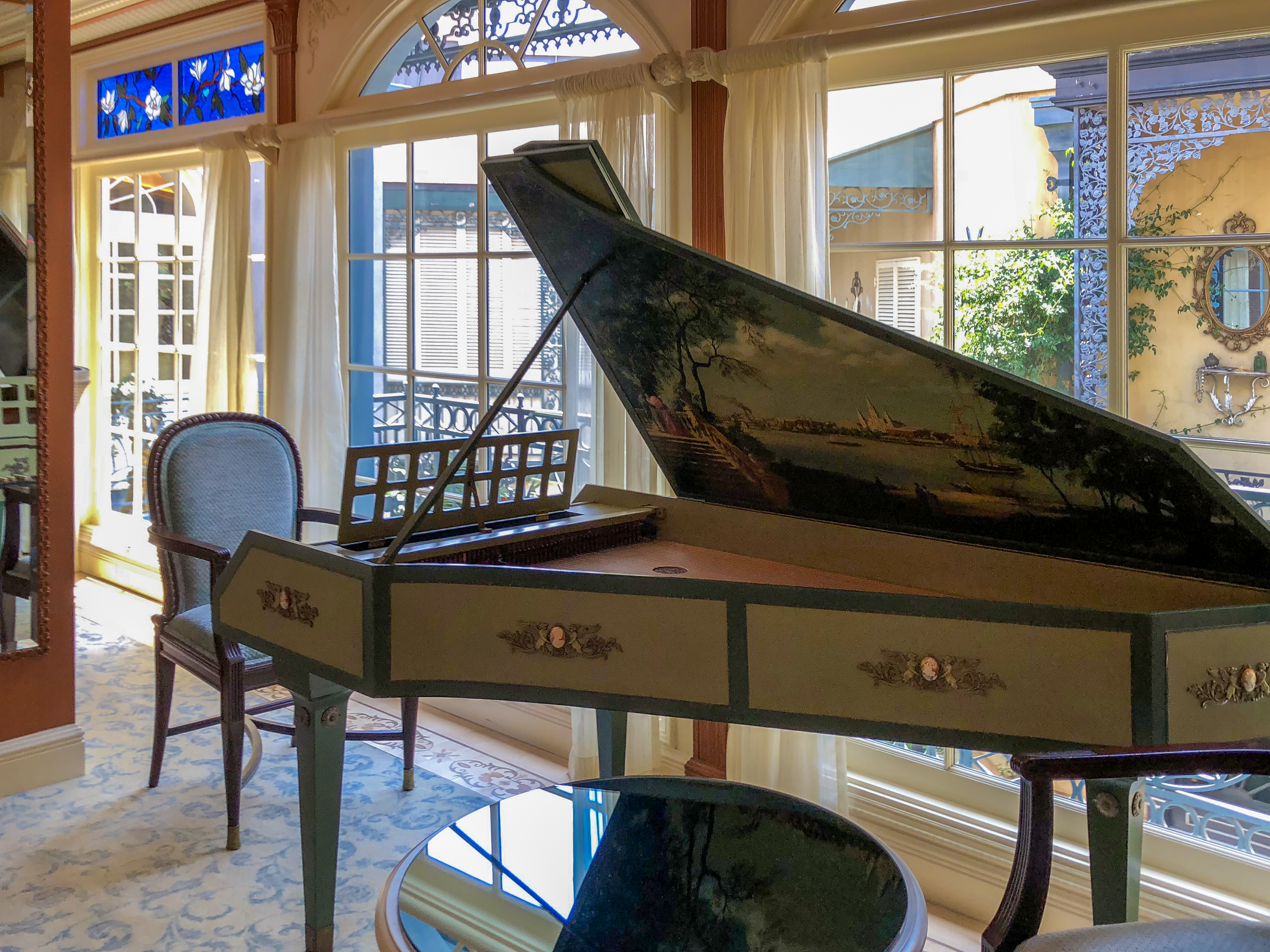
Harpsichord

== Membership ==
The initial cost of membership at Disneyland and Walt Disney World was previously reported to be $35,000, followed by annual dues of $15,000. As of 2025, the cost of membership reportedly includes a $65,000 initiation fee, varying between individuals and corporations, and $20,625 annually for individuals, more for corporations.

Club 33 members and their guests are required to abide by a strict code of conduct while within the premises. This includes a dress code for both dining rooms, a promise to behave with dignity and good taste, and restrictions for both photography and videography. Refusal to abide by these standards may result in refusal of service and potentially revocation of membership.

== Club 33 in other Disney parks ==
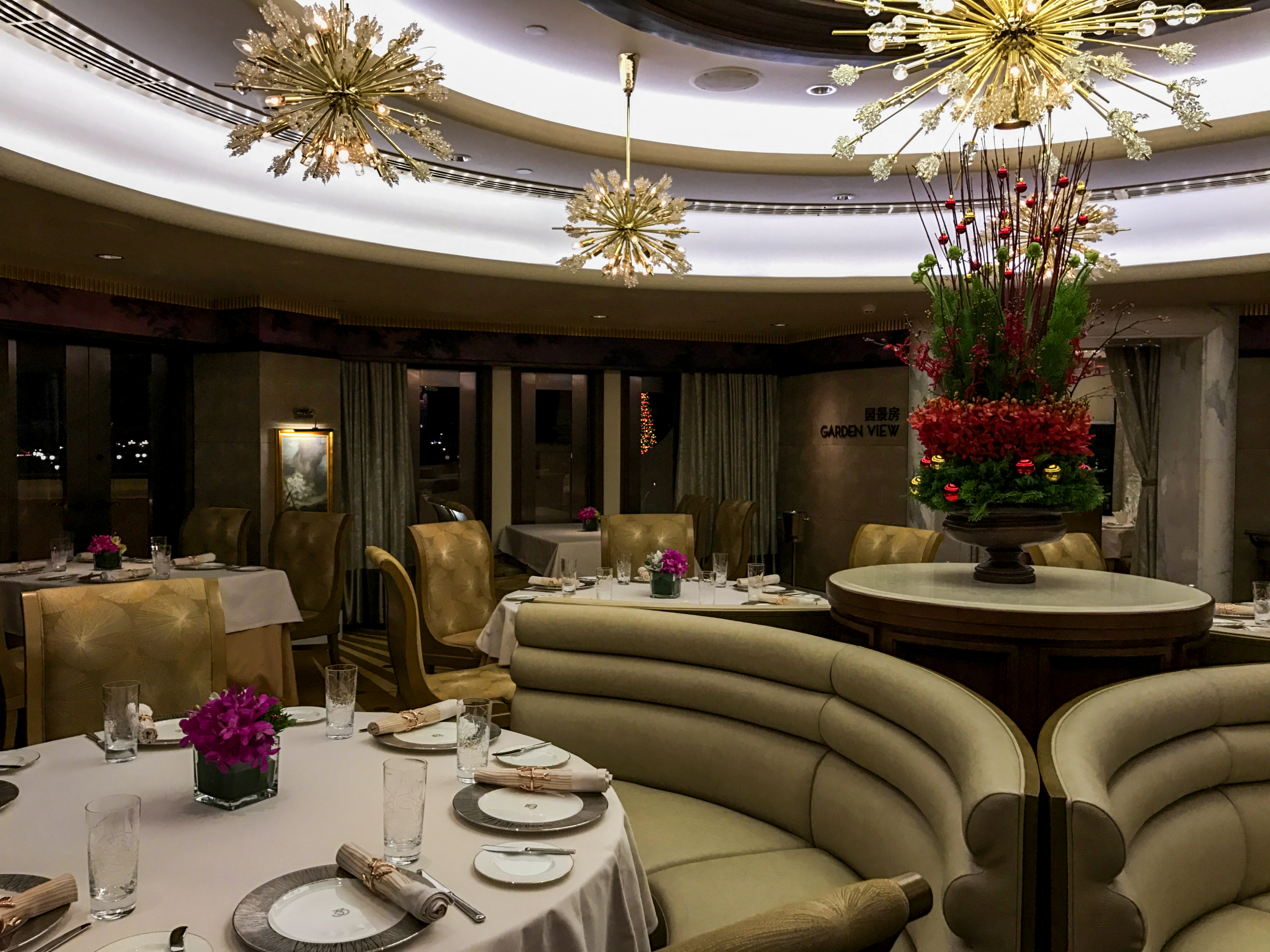
Club 33 at Shanghai Disneyland

Club 33 at Tokyo Disneyland began operations in 1983. It is located on Center Street in World Bazaar.

Club 33 at Shanghai Disneyland opened along with the park in the summer of 2016. Like the Tokyo location, it is located in the park's entrance area, Mickey Avenue.

Four separate Club 33 locations opened at Walt Disney World, each with their own name. Though the locations were set to open in Fall 2017, the Spotlight Lounge opened in March 2018 at Hollywood Studios, followed by Constellation Club at Epcot, Captain's Quarters at Magic Kingdom, and Harambe House at Animal Kingdom.

== In other media ==
A film about Club 33 was announced in May 2024 with Shawn Levy and Darren Lemke as producers. In January 2025, Dan Hernandez and Benji Samit joined as writers of the film.
