= Rufford Charters =

The Rufford Charters were grants of land and grants of Regalian rights over land, which created an extra-parochial liberty, known as the Liberty of Rufford in the County of Nottinghamshire in England. It is defined as an area in which regalian rights were exercised by the Cistercian monks of Rufford Abbey.

== Definitions ==
A charter is a grant of authority or rights, stating that the granter formally recognizes the prerogative of the recipient to exercise the rights specified. It is implicit that the grantor retains superiority (or sovereignty), and that the grantee admits a limited (or inferior) status within the relationship, and it is within that sense that charters were historically granted, and that sense is retained in modern usage of the term. Also, a charter can give royal permission to start a colony or a Liberty. Regalian right was the right of a monarch to receive the income from the estates of a vacant Bishopric or Abbey.

== Grants ==
The Cistercians Monks of Rufford Abbey received Grants and Charters of Regalian right which was the right to receive the income from the estates of a vacant bishopric or abbey within its own boundaries of the Liberty of Rufford.

The Cistercian monks who lived at Rufford Abbey received many grants and charters and letters patent of prerogative and extraterritoriality and of confirmation of manors and land and franchises from kings and queens, dukes and earls, barons, lords and knights.

Early in the reign of Henry III (1216–72), Hugh, son of Richard De Caunton, gave the Cistercians a small parcel of land and confirmed a slightly larger grant by his father, Robert De Caus.

Thomas De Muskham waived in the abbey's favour his right to 6s. of yearly rent.

In 1250 William De Besthorpe, gave the third part of his property here.

In 1287, at the inquisition post-mortem of Robert de Everingham, Lord of Laxton, gave to the Cistercians who lived at Rufford Abbey half a Knight's fee from his barony in Kirketon, possible Kirton, Walesby, Willoughby and Besthorpe, which was worth £10 yearly, all of which the Abbey got the King to confirm. It also secured confirmation of the privileges it had obtained for itself and its tenants, including exemption from secular exactions on all that was bought or sold by them or was conveyed for or by them by land or water, and the right of free warren for the monks throughout their Manors and lordship.

The Cistercians Monks of Rufford Abbey held a weekly market and fair and had the right to cut and sell trees from the Sherwood Forest in Nottinghamshire, England. In 1359 they received over £400 from sales of timber.

King Henry II granted the monks licence to take ‘whatever was needful for their own use from the forest, to keep a forester, as in the time of his grandfather Henry I.

The Valor Ecclesiasticus of 1534 provide gross income of the Abbey of £254 6s. 8d. and the clear annual value as £176 11s. 6d.

The temporalities were spread over a large area, including the parishes of Babworth, Blidworth, Boughton, Bothamsall, Bilsthorpe, Edwinstowe, Egmanton, Eakring, Farnsfield, Kirton, and Coddington, East Retford, Holme, Kelham, Kneesall, i.e. Kersall and Ompton, Kirklington, Kirton, Littleborough, Maplebeck, Nottingham, Ollerton, Rufford, Southwell, Staythorpe, Tuxford, Walesby, Warsop, Welham, Wellow, Willoughby, and Winkburn, in Nottinghamshire.

Abney, Brampton, Brackenfield, Chesterfield, Palterton, and Shirebrook, in Derbyshire; Alkborough and Barton upon Humber, in Lincolnshire; and Rotherham and Penistone, in Yorkshire. These villages were known as the Liberty of Rufford.
