= Liberty of Rufford =

The Liberty of Rufford was an extra-parochial liberty in the County of Nottinghamshire.

It extends southward from the vicinity of Ollerton, for more than six miles, along the banks of the Rainworth-water, and consists of 10,221 acres. It is defined as an area in which regalian rights were revoked and where land was held by a Lord of the manor, that is to say, an area in which rights reserved to the King had been devolved into private hands.

Liberties were areas of widely variable extent which were independent of the usual system of hundreds and boroughs for a number of different reasons, usually to do with peculiarities of tenure. Because of their tenurial rather than geographical origin, the areas covered by liberties could either be widely scattered across a county. The Liberty of Rufford included the Parishes of Bilsthorpe, Eakring and most of Ollerton, Ompton, Boughton, Wellow, and extended into Blidworth, Edwinstowe, Egmanton, Farnsfield, Kirton, Tuxford, and Walesby,

== History of Liberty of Rufford ==
The manor house of the Liberty of Rufford was called Rufford Abbey. The Manor of Rufford was granted on 12 July 1147 by Gilbert de Gant, to the Abbots of Rufford and his Cistercian monks in honour of the Blessed Virgin Mary,

The Cistercian monks who lived at Rufford Abbey received many grants and charters and letters patent of prerogative and extraterritoriality and of confirmation of manors and land and franchises from kings, queens, dukes, earls, barons, lords and knights.

The grants and charters which created the Liberty of Rufford are known as the Rufford Charters.

At the dissolution it possessed a revenue of £254.6.8.

The remains of Rufford Abbey have been incorporated into a spacious mansion, situated in a richly-wooded park of 1400 acres; the large hall was altered to its present state in the reign of Elizabeth. An apartment in which George IV of the United Kingdom slept on one of his visits to the north is still called the Prince of Wales bed-room.
