= Rufford Abbey =

Country estate in Nottinghamshire, England

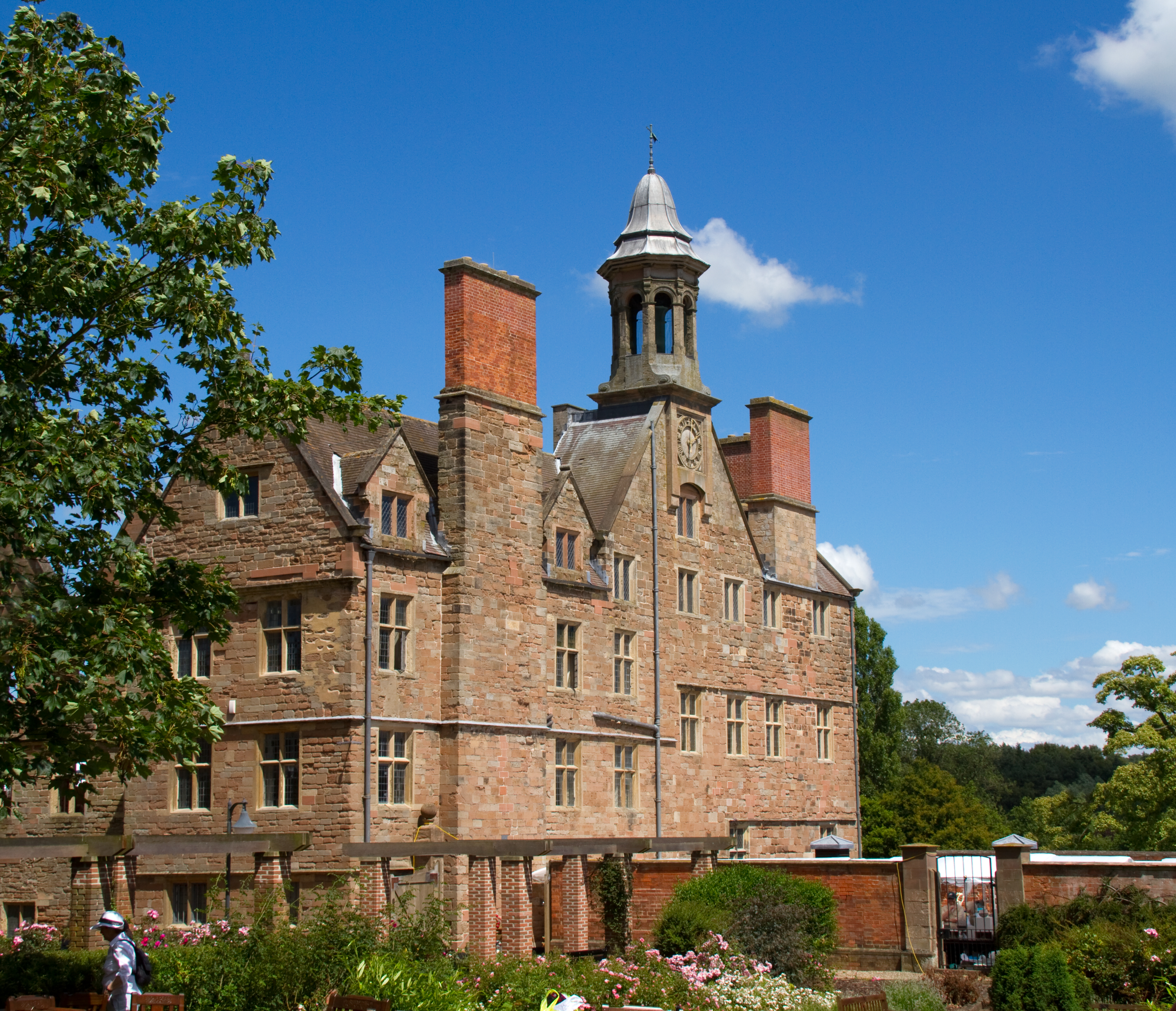
- A view of the Abbey

- Location within Nottinghamshire

Monastery information
- Other name: Rufford Country Park
- Order: Cistercian
- Established: 1147

Site
- Location: Old Rufford Road, Rufford, Nottinghamshire, NG22 9DF
- Coordinates: 53°10′31″N 01°02′08″W
- Website: www.ruffordabbey.com

Listed Building – Grade I
- Official name: Rufford Abbey
- Designated: 18 March 1949
- Reference no.: 1302352

National Register of Historic Parks and Gardens
- Designated: 1 January 1986
- Reference no.: 1001085

Rufford Abbey is a country estate in Rufford, Nottinghamshire, England, two miles (4 km) south of Ollerton. Originally a Cistercian abbey, it was converted to a country house in the 16th century after Henry VIII's dissolution of the monasteries. Part of the house was demolished in the 20th century, but the remains, standing in 150 acres of park and woodland, are open to the public as Rufford Country Park. Part of the park is a local nature reserve. The remains of the house is owned by English Heritage and the country park is owned by Nottinghamshire County Council and managed by Parkwood Leisure.

The house itself is constructed of rubble, brick, dressed stone and ashlar with ashlar dressings and plain tile roofs.

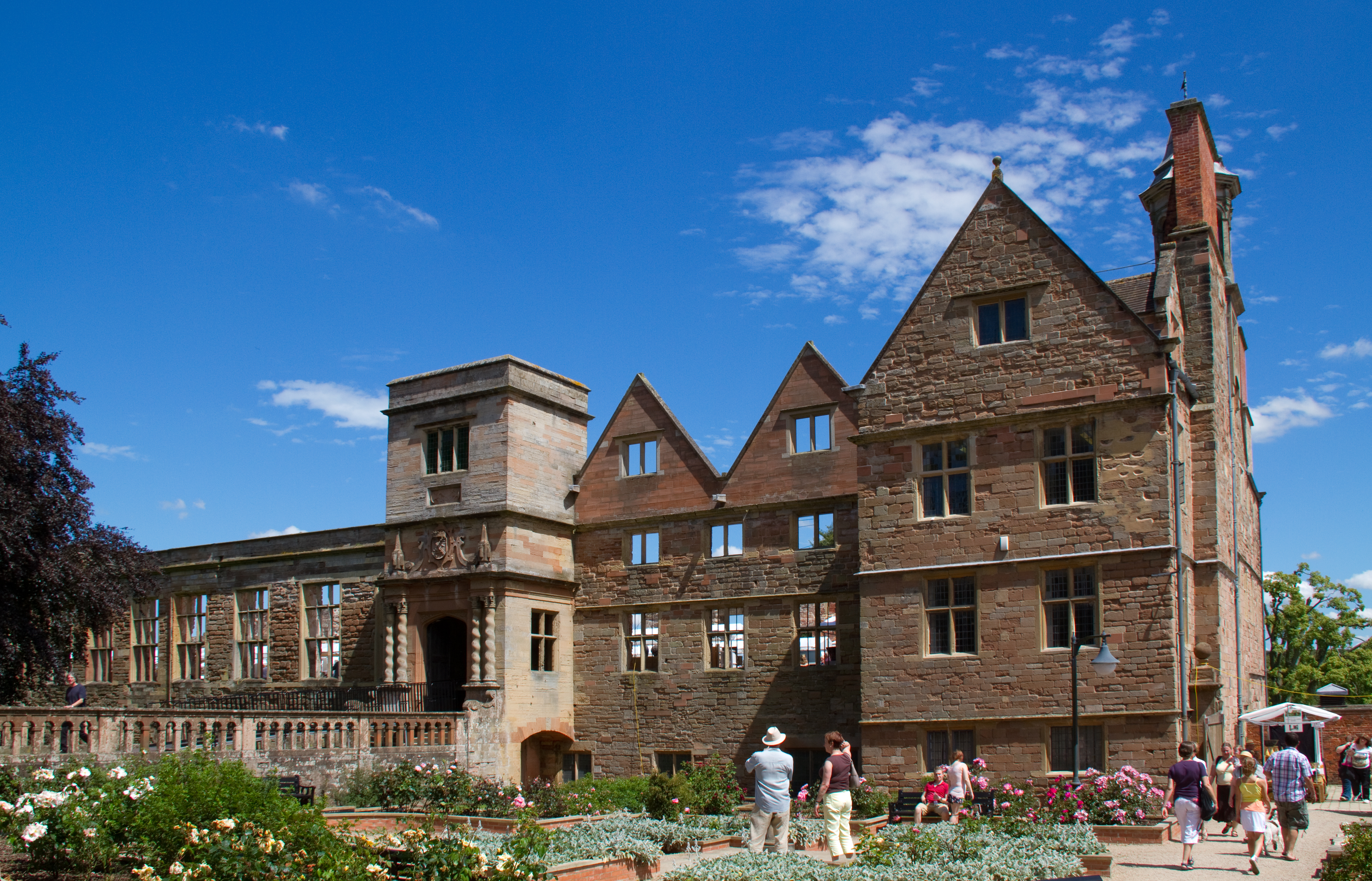
Rufford Abbey from the front

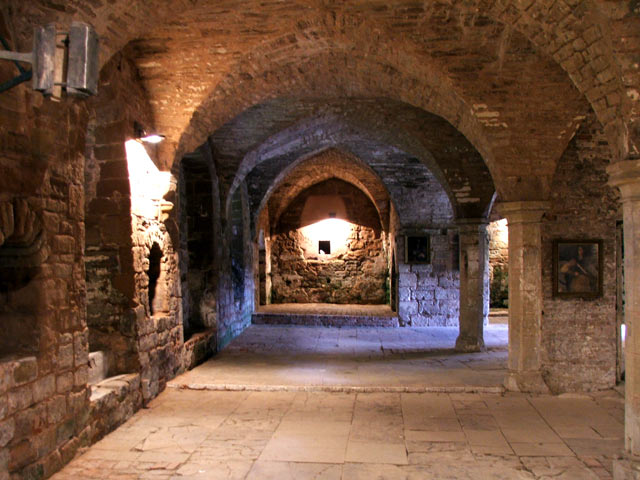
Below Rufford Abbey

== The Monastic Foundation ==
The abbey itself was founded by Gilbert de Gant, on 12 July 1147, and populated with Cistercian monks from Rievaulx Abbey in Yorkshire.

The English Pope, Adrian IV, gave the blessing for the abbey in 1156; after that, the abbey's lands expanded and the villagers of Cratley, Grimston, Rufford, and Inkersall were evicted. A new village of Wellow, just outside the estate, housed some of the displaced people.

The Valor Ecclesiasticus of 1534 gives the gross income of the abbey as £254 6s. 8d. (equivalent to £210,000 in 2025), and the clear annual value as £176 11s. 6d. (equivalent to £150,000 in 2025).

Abbot Doncaster obtained a pension of £25 a year, on the dissolution of the house in 1536 among the lesser monasteries, but it was voided on his speedy appointment to the rectory of Rotherham on 2 July 1536.

After its dissolution, the abbey gained a reputation of being haunted by the spectre of a giant monk carrying a skull.

Abbots of Rufford

- Philip de Kyme, temp. Stephen
- Edward, 1203
- Geoffrey, c. temp. John, 1218, &c.
- Thomas
- Simon, c. 1232
- G—, c. 1239
- Geoffrey, c. 1252
- William, c. 1259
- Henry, 1278
- Thomas de Stayngreve, c. 1283
- Henry, c. 1288
- Henry de Tring, c. 1315
- Elias Lyvet (Levett), c. 1332
- Robert de Mapelbek, 1352
- Thomas, 1366
- John de Harlesay, 1372
- John de Farnsfeld, 1394
- Thomas Sewally, c. 1400
- Robert de Welles, 1421
- Robert Warthill, died 1456
- William Cresswell, 1456
- John Pomfrat, died 1462
- John Lilly, 1462
- John Greyne, 1465
- Roland Bliton, 1516
- Thomas Doncaster, last abbot

== Country house ==
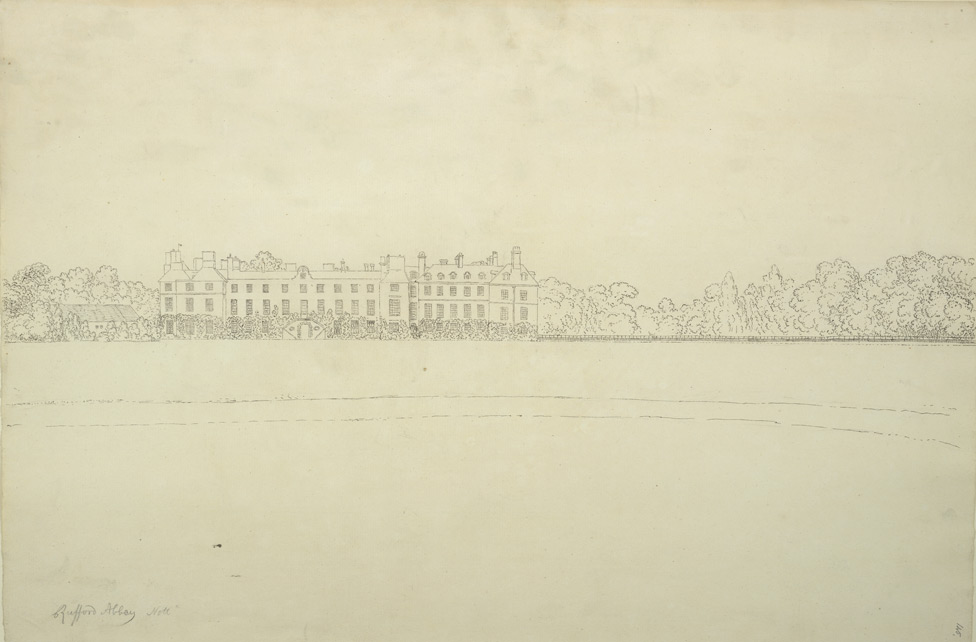
Ink on paper drawing of Rufford Abbey by Samuel Hieronymus Grimm, 1773

The estate was granted to George Talbot, 4th Earl of Shrewsbury. It was partly demolished and converted to a country house between 1560 and 1590 by George Talbot, 6th Earl of Shrewsbury, Bess of Hardwick, Countess of Shrewsbury's husband. Lady Arbella Stuart, Bess of Hardwick's granddaughter visited Rufford Abbey. In 1603, the Main Plot took place for Lady Arbella Stuart to replace King James VI and I on the throne. Arbella was the cousin of King James I and James was the son of Mary, Queen of Scots In August 1614, King James came to Rufford from Belvoir Castle, and the Abbey was the scene of a masque entertainment, described as an "antick Maske".

The estate was inherited in 1626 by Mary Talbot, sister of the 7th and 8th Earls from whom it passed to her husband, Sir George Savile, 2nd Baronet. He remodelled the house in 1685–95. Sir William Savile, 3rd Baronet, George's successor, made Rufford Abbey the seat of the Savile family after he burnt down the Saviles' original home to prevent its being occupied by a Parliamentarian garrison during the Civil War, but was killed in action in 1644. It was next inhabited by his son, the Marquess of Halifax, the Lord Privy Seal, who died in 1695. In 1679, he constructed a new north wing on the site of the abbey church, containing reception rooms and a long gallery. He also built the large stable block to the right of the house. The surviving service wing was also added by the Saviles in the 17th century.

Sir George Savile, 8th Baronet died unmarried in 1784 and the estate passed to his nephew The Hon. Richard Lumley-Saunderson, later 6th Earl of Scarbrough. He was the younger son of the 4th Earl of Scarbrough and Barbara Savile, the 8th Baronet's sister and heiress. On his death the estate passed to his younger brother, the 7th Earl, and then to the latter's son the 8th Earl, who bequeathed the estate in turn to his second natural son Captain Henry Lumley-Savile. When Henry died in 1881 it passed to his younger brother Augustus William Lumley-Savile (1829–1887) and then to his eldest (but illegitimate) brother, the diplomat John Lumley-Savile, who assumed the surname of Savile only and was created Baron Savile the following year.

By the early 1900s, the Rufford Abbey Estate comprised some 18,500 acres (75 km^{2}), but had begun to feel the effects of rising running costs and reduced incomes. In 1931 the estate descended to the 3rd Baron Savile, who was only 12 years old, and the trustees took the decision to sell the estate off in lots in 1938. Sir Albert Ball bought much of the land, and quickly sold the house to the eccentric aristocrat Harry Clifton.

The abbey and 150 acres of grounds were bought by Nottinghamshire County Council in 1952. In 1956 the late 17th century north and east wings were demolished and the remaining west range and south service wing put into the care of the Ministry of Works. The site was opened to the public by Nottinghamshire County Council; car parking, retail outlets and visitor services are managed on behalf of the council by a contractor in co-operation with English Heritage.

== History of The Lordship and Liberty of Rufford ==
The Manor of Rufford was listed in the Domesday Book.

The Rufford Estate covered approximately twenty-nine square miles and, in addition to the ancient Liberty of Rufford, it included the parishes of Bilsthorpe, Eakring and most of Ollerton, Ompton, Boughton, Wellow, and extended into Blidworth, Edwinstowe, Egmanton, Farnsfield, Kirton, Tuxford, and Walesby.

The titles of Lord of the manor of Rufford and of the Liberty of Rufford were sold at auction by the Manorial Society of Great Britain in July 2010.

== Ice houses ==
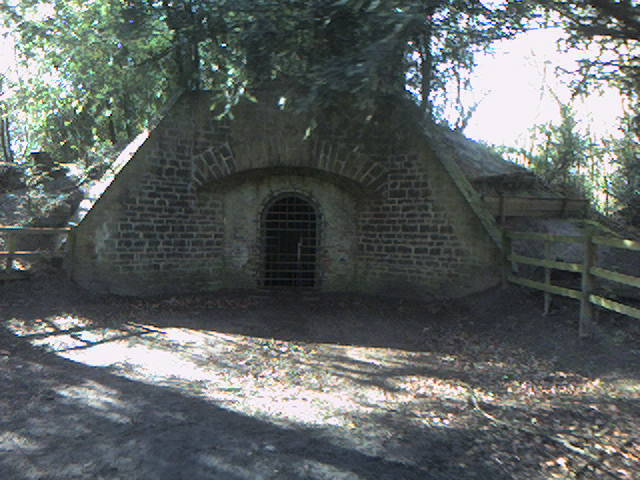
Rufford Abbey Ice House 1

Between 1729 and c.1845 many improvements were made to the Rufford estate. For example, the addition of the bath house, the creation of the lake and mill buildings, the construction of the brewhouse, water tower and coach house, and also the addition of five ice houses.

Although Rufford Abbey once boasted five ice houses, only two remain today. All were constructed around 1820, when the estate was owned by John Lumley-Savile, 8th Earl of Scarbrough (1788–1856). The five ice houses are located near Rufford lake, created c. 1750; for the simple reason that the movement of ice from its source was easier.

Not all of Rufford's ice houses faced north, as accessibility and the logistics of the ice may have meant that the builders found it easier to place the doorways facing the lake rather than northerly. It is believed that ice was mainly taken from Blackwalk Pond, which was drained to make way for housing in the 20th century. Blackwalk Pond was used to serve the abbey in Rufford's monastic era, and later supplied water to Rufford's water tower and brewhouse, which remain on site today.

== The 1851 poaching incident and ballad ==
In 1851, a gang of forty or so poachers assembled in Rufford Park as a mass action against what was perceived to be the unfair monopolising of game-hunting rights by wealthy landowners. The poachers were attacked by ten gamekeepers and, in the ensuing battle, one of the gamekeepers was badly injured and later died of a fractured skull. Four of the poachers' ringleaders were arrested and each subsequently sentenced to deportation and fourteen years of penal servitude for manslaughter. The incident gave rise to the popular ballad, Rufford Park Poachers (Roud #1759), which depicts the poachers as bold heroes.

One of, if not the, earliest recordings is a 1907 performance by Joseph Taylor, collected on wax cylinder by the musicologist Percy Grainger in 1907. It was digitised by the British Library and made available online in 2018. Grainger transcribed "Rufford Park Poachers" in the third movement of his suite, Lincolnshire Posy.

"Rufford Abbey" is a popular piece composed and arranged for brass band by Drake Rimmer. It is often used as an intermediate grade competition piece, and is a popular choice for recitals.

Martin Carthy recorded the song on his 1982 album Out of the Cut.

== In media ==
The abbey was the setting for Helen Cresswell's children's book (1984) and later TV series called The Secret World of Polly Flint (1987). The small neighbouring village of Wellow was also used.

== Amenities ==
The park is open to visitors and has several cafés, gift and garden shops. A visitor centre in the courtyard was opened in 2013 by (then) local MP for Sherwood constituency, Mark Spencer.

Part of the courtyard

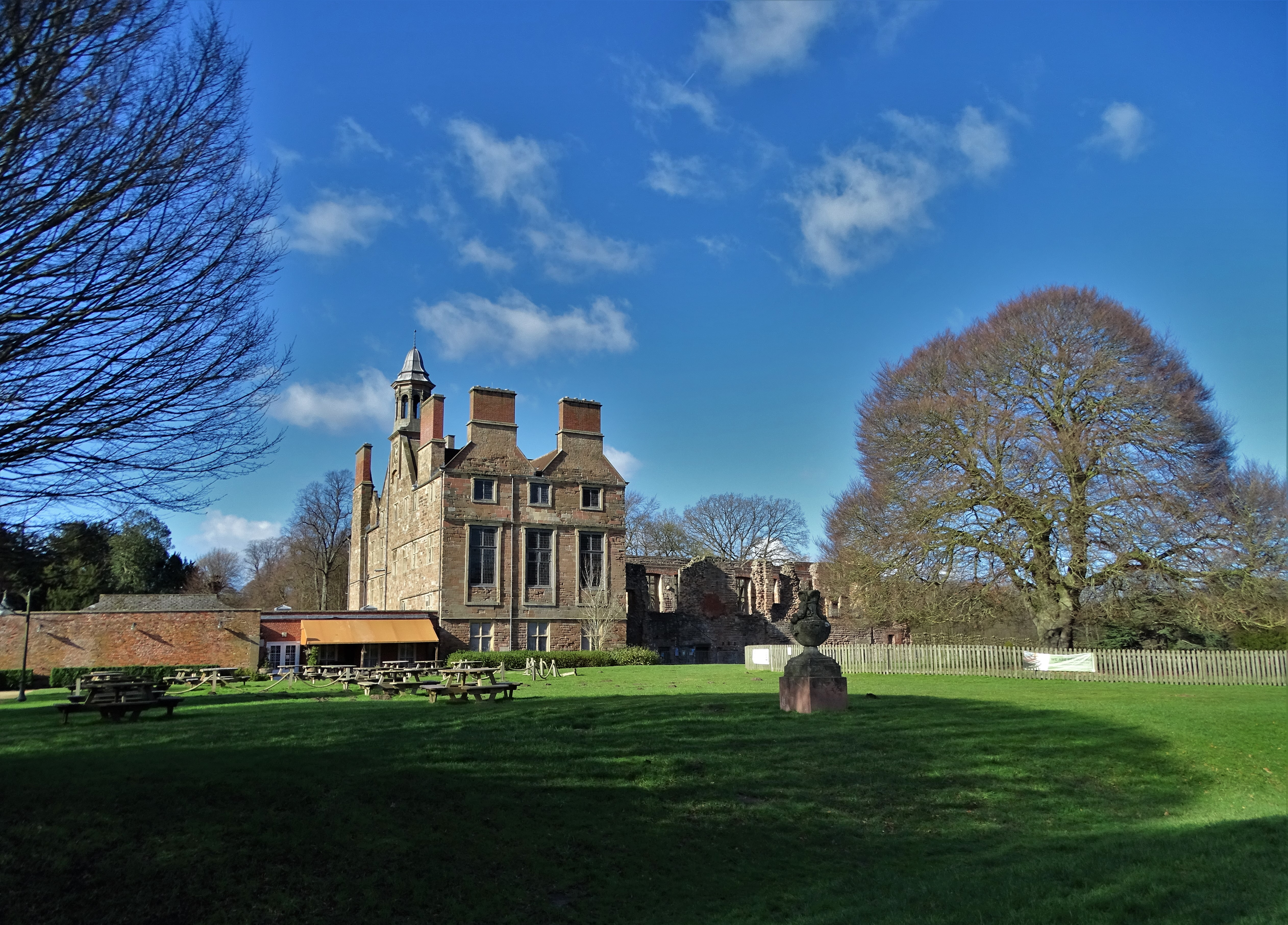
The Saville Restaurant and Jacobean House

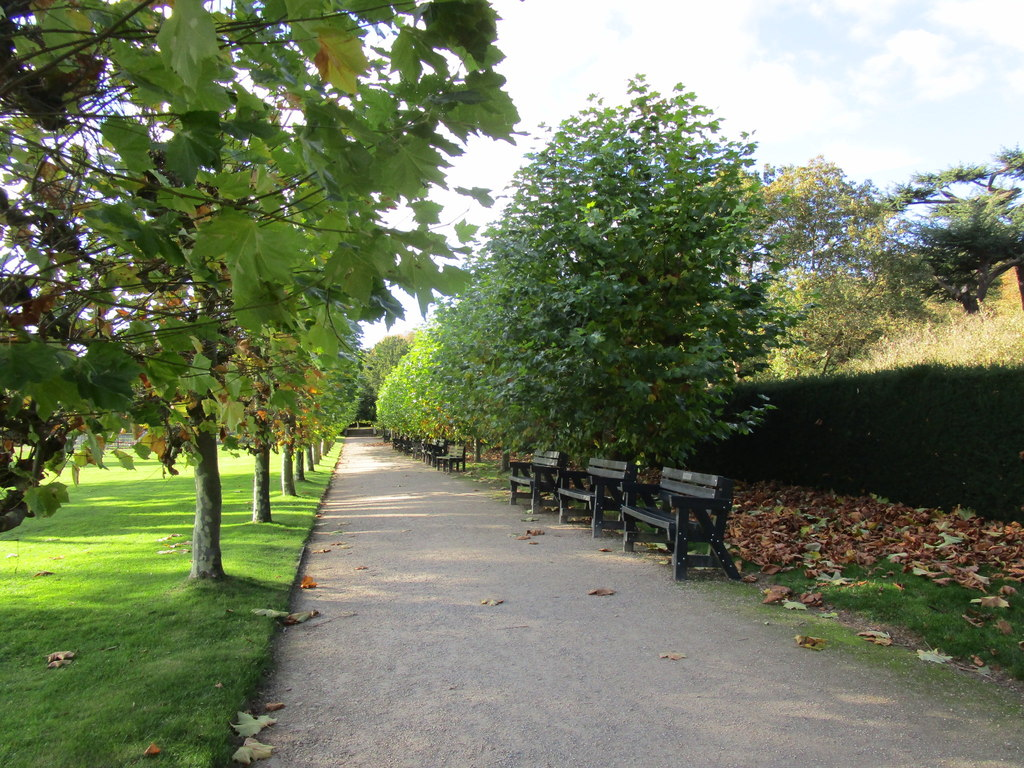
Lime Walk, Rufford Country Park

== See also ==
- Grade I listed buildings in Nottinghamshire
- Listed buildings in Rufford, Nottinghamshire
