= Jordan Foliot =

English noble

Coat of arms of Jordan Foliot, Lord of Jordan Castle, Gules, a bend argent.

Jordan Foliot (c. 1249-1298) was son of Richard Foliot (-1290), Knight of Jordan Castle, and Margery de Stuteville daughter of William de Stuteville (- c. 1259) and Margaret de Say (- c. 1243). Richard had the Rights of Stallage of the Market and Fair on St. Swithuns day valued at 40s yearly in Wellow.

== Jordan Castle ==
Jordan Foliot, Baron de Foliot, Lord of Jordan Castle was granted the power to embattle his dwelling at Jordan Castle. He was the Lord of the manor of Grimston, and Wellow, and of Besthorpe, with the Soc of Grimston, and its members, in Kirton Schidrintune, in Willoughby, and Walesby, in Besthorpe, and Carleton, and in Franesfeild.

== Peerage ==
He was summoned to Parliament in 1295, whereby he is held to have become Lord Foliot.

== Family and Descendants ==
Jordan Foliot married Margery de Newmarch, daughter of Adam de Newmarch and Isabel de Mowbray (see House of Mowbray).

Their son, Richard Foliot ( -c. 1317), married Joan de Braose ( - c. 1324), daughter of William de Braose, 2nd Baron Braose.

Richard Foliot II, the son of Richard and Joan, died in 1325, when "any hereditary barony, that may be supposed to have been created by the writ of 1295, fell into abeyance."

Margery Foliott, the daughter of Richard and Joan, married Hugh de Hastings who was a younger son of John Hastings, 1st Baron Hastings and Isabel de Dispenser, daughter of Hugh le Despenser and Isabella de Beauchamp.
