= Moorhouse Chantry Chapel =

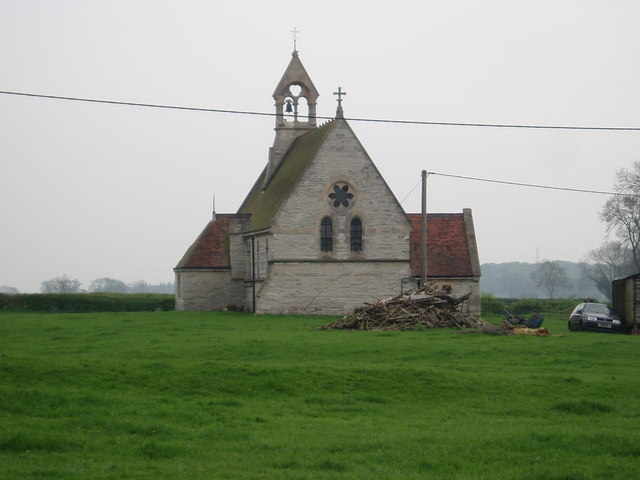
- Moorhouse Chantry Chapel
- Moorhouse Chantry Chapel
- 53°11′34″N 0°52′28″W
- OS grid reference: SK 75302 66780
- Location: Moorhouse, Nottinghamshire
- Country: England
- Denomination: Church of England

History
- Dedication: St Nicholas

Architecture
- Heritage designation: Grade II* listed
- Architect: Henry Clutton
- Completed: 1860

Administration
- Diocese: Diocese of Southwell and Nottingham
- Archdeaconry: Newark
- Deanery: Newark and Southwell
- Parish: Laxton

Moorhouse Chantry Chapel is a Grade II* listed Church of England chapel in the Diocese of Southwell and Nottingham at Moorhouse, within the Laxton and Moorhouse civil parish, Nottinghamshire.

== History ==
The church dates from 1860, and was built by Henry Clutton for Evelyn Denison, 1st Viscount Ossington in the 12th-century French Gothic Revival style.

It is in a group of parishes comprising:

- St Swithin’s Church, Wellow
- St Bartholomew’s Church, Kneesall
- St Michael the Archangel's Church, Laxton

== See also ==
- Grade II* listed buildings in Nottinghamshire
- Listed buildings in Laxton and Moorhouse
