= Rufford, Nottinghamshire =

Village and civil parish in Nottinghamshire, England

Coordinates: 53.175°N 1.037°W

Rufford
- Village and civil parish
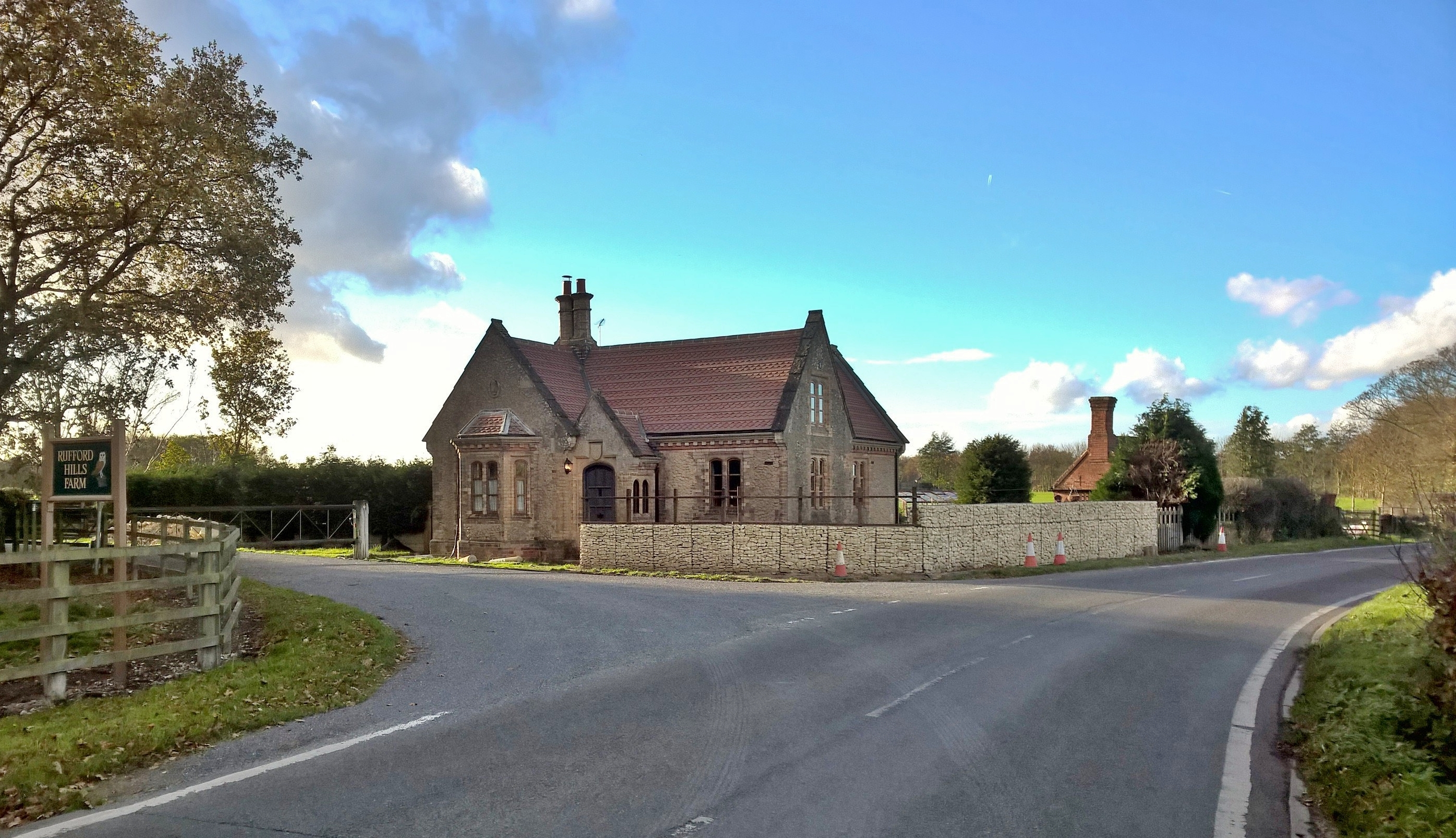
- A view of the village

- Location within Nottinghamshire
- Interactive map of Rufford
- Area: 12.91 sq mi (33.4 km^{2})
- Population: 536 (2021)
  - Density: 42/sq mi (16/km^{2})
- OS grid reference: SK 64358 64675
  - London: 120 mi (190 km) SSE
- District: Newark and Sherwood
- Shire county: Nottinghamshire
- Region: East Midlands
- Country: England
- Sovereign state: United Kingdom
- Post town: NEWARK
- Postcode district: NG22
- Dialling code: 0115
- Police: Nottinghamshire
- Fire: Nottinghamshire
- Ambulance: East Midlands
- UK Parliament: Sherwood

Rufford, in the Newark and Sherwood district of Nottinghamshire, is the site of two villages whose inhabitants were evicted in the 12th century. Cistercian monasteries were established and the monks wished to ensure their isolation.

The area is centred around Rufford Abbey, a large country estate, and adjacent Rufford Country Park, a leisure amenity run by Nottinghamshire County Council. The population count was 536 residents at the 2021 census. It is part of the Sherwood Forest Parliament constituency.

A small portion of Bilsthorpe village falls across the eastern boundary. Other local features include Clipstone forest which is part of the Sherwood Pines Forest Park. There is also a holiday village to the north of the parish.

== Mill and ford ==
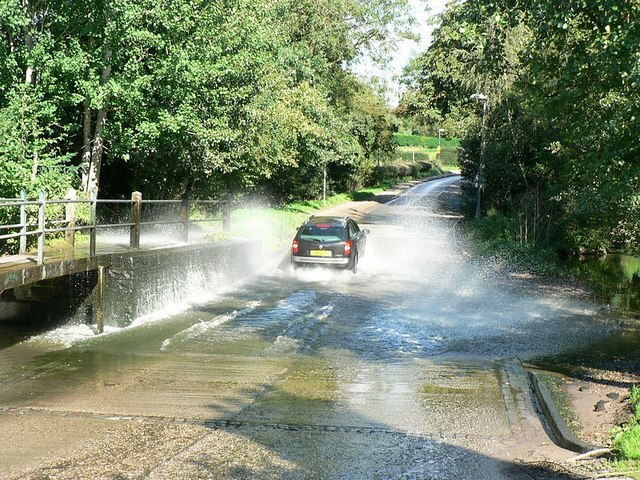
Vehicle crossing the ford with normal water level

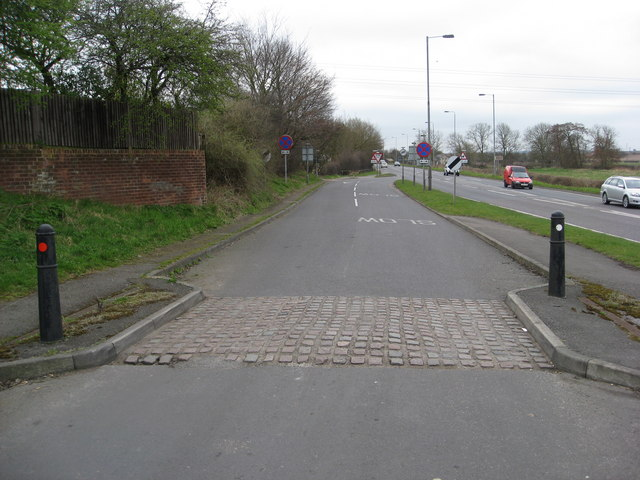
Raised plateau with side pinch points created by kerbed build-outs at the start of Station Road, Ollerton with the junction to the A614 beyond

Rufford Mill ford is located within the settlement on Rufford Lane. The mill pond is fed by Rainworth Water.

Rufford Lane was closed to through-traffic by Nottinghamshire County Council in December 2022, at a point near to the old mill, using a Traffic Regulation Order (TRO), partly due to having become a spectator-attraction with a regular social media following particularly during flooding, exacerbated by vehicles drawn to the area to create a wash for filming.

Nottinghamshire Police made the request for closure after one casualty was reported, a motorcyclist who attempted to cross the watersplash at an inappropriate speed, who afterwards confirmed a mental-health episode, stating "...I'm that one idiot who went through the ford at 50 mph [80 km/h] on a motorbike". In December 2023, the council expressed a preference for making the closure permanent, but had to undertake a four-week minimum consultation, starting on 5 February 2024, ending 4 March.

In May 2024, a further 18-month closure was announced "to allow the council time to consider the public’s responses to the consultation". The order will run consecutively, starting from the June expiry of the initial closure period.

Rufford Lane is a link between the A614 and A616 main roads. Due to through-road closure, in early 2024 the BBC reported increased traffic levels and dangerous driving with vehicles short-cutting away from the main 'A' roads, using instead Station Road, in nearby Ollerton.

Closed-circuit television shows vehicles mounting the footways, and narrow-misses of residents themselves. The village street has long-standing traffic calming measures, using raised, textured plateaux and pinch points.

A 2023 Nottinghamshire County Council report quoted a detour-length of four miles (6.4 km).

In October 2025, Nottinghamshire County Council, under new controlling political party Reform UK from May 2025, announced yet-another public consultation on the road closure, initially to consider the responses from the previous consultation, followed by a public consultation of six weeks' statutory minimum. Of 219 responses, 194 objections to closure were received, together with suggestions of re-opening with traffic calming measures and flood gates. 25 responses were received in favour of continued closure, including various local bodies.

In December 2025, the consultation was confirmed to be closing on 30 January 2026.

=== Conservation ===
In late 2024, an eel ladder, constructed by Nottinghamshire Wildlife Trust with funding from Severn Trent Water, was created to assist in the upriver journeys of European eels, an endangered species, as they climb towards the mill-pond at the weir section.

== History ==
The parish contained two villages, Rufford in the north of the parish and Inkersall (or Winkerfield) to the south, located west of Bilsthorpe. The villages were affected by nearby Rufford Abbey. The English Pope, Adrian IV, gave his blessing for the abbey in 1156 and following this the abbey's lands expanded and the villagers of Cratley, Rufford, Grimston and Inkersall were evicted.

== See also ==
- Listed buildings in Rufford, Nottinghamshire
- Rufford, Lancashire
