= Listed buildings in Laxton and Moorhouse =

Laxton and Moorhouse is a civil parish in the Newark and Sherwood district of Nottinghamshire, England. The parish contains 21 listed buildings that are recorded in the National Heritage List for England. Of these, one is listed at Grade I, the highest of the three grades, one is at Grade II*, the middle grade, and the others are at Grade II, the lowest grade. The parish contains the village of Laxton, the hamlet of Moorhouse, and the surrounding countryside. Most of the listed buildings are farmhouses and farm buildings, and the others include a church, a cross and a war memorial in the churchyard, and the entrance gates, other houses, a former school, later a village hall, and a telephone kiosk.

== Key ==
Grade	Criteria
I	Buildings of exceptional interest, sometimes considered to be internationally important
II*	Particularly important buildings of more than special interest
II	Buildings of national importance and special interest

== Buildings ==
Name and location	Photograph	Date	Notes	Grade
St Michael the Archangel's Church; 53.19584°N 0.92079°W		13th century	The church has been altered and extended through the centuries, including a restoration and some rebuilding from 1859 by Hine and Evans. The church is built in stone with slate roofs, and it consists of a nave with a clerestory, north and south aisles, a north aisle chapel, a south porch, a chancel with a south chapel, and a west tower. The tower has three stages, diagonal buttresses, a west stair turret, two string courses, an eaves band with gargoyles, and an embattled parapet with eight crocketed pinnacles. On the west side is a re-set 13th-century doorway with shafts, a moulded arch and a hood mould, and above it is a double lancet window, the middle stage contains clock faces, and in the top stage are double lancet bell openings with hood moulds. Along the nave is an embattled parapet with eight crocketed pinnacles and seven gargoyles.	I
Churchyard cross 53.19562°N 0.92074°W		17th century	The cross is in the churchyard of St Michael the Archangel's Church, and is in stone. It has a square plinth, on which is a round column with a square base, and a damaged moulded square cap.	II
Ivy House Farmhouse; 53.19573°N 0.92344°W		17th century	The farmhouse, which was later fronted and extended, is in brick and stone on a plinth, it is partly rendered, and has quoins, rebated and partly dentilled eaves and a tile roof. There are two storeys, attics and a cellar, and an L-shaped plan, with a front range of four bays, a lean-to on the west, and a double-gabled rear wing. On the front are a doorway and sash windows, all with segmental heads, and elsewhere are casement windows.	II
Church Farmhouse; 53.19199°N 0.87468°W		Early 18th century	The farmhouse is in brick on a partial plinth, with sprocketed eaves and a sprocketed pantile roof. There are two storeys and attics, and an L-shaped plan with a front range of three bays. In the centre is a doorway with a segmental head, and a gabled timber hood on curved brackets. The windows are horizontally-sliding sashes, those in the ground floor with segmental heads. At the rear is a later two-storey extension, with a toilet block, a porch in the angle, and a single-storey wash house.	II
Old Bar Farmhouse; 53.19641°N 0.91676°W		Early 18th century	The farmhouse, which was later extended, is in brick with diapering, on a partial plinth, and has a floor band, a dentilled eaves band and a pantile roof. There are two storeys and attics, and a front of three unequal bays. On the front is a doorway and casement window, the ground floor openings with segmental heads. Elsewhere, there are more casement windows, horizontally-sliding sashes, and a French window.	II
Lilac Farmhouse; 53.19605°N 0.92421°W		1748	The farmhouse is in brick, with a floor band, rebated eaves, an eaves band and a tile roof. There are two storeys and attics, and an L-shaped plan, with a front range of three bays, and a rear wing. On the front is a central doorway and casement windows, all with segmental heads, and elsewhere there are horizontally-sliding sash windows. Adjoining the house is a stable with a pantile roof, a single storey, a single bay, and a stable door.	II
Farm buildings, Lilac Farm; 53.19600°N 0.92452°W		1760	The farm buildings consist of a barn, a stable, and a pigeoncote over a stable. They are in brick on a partial plinth, with dentilled eaves and pantile roofs. The barn has two storeys, six bays, and a dated tumbled south gable, and a coped north gable. It contains barn doors, and vents in diamond patterns. To the north is a two-bay stable containing casement windows and stable doors, all with segmental heads. Beyond that is the pigeoncote with a single bay, containing two stable doors in round-headed openings.	II
Aggrie House; 53.19328°N 0.87937°W	—	1775	The house is in brick on a concrete plinth, with cogged eaves and a pantile roof. There are two storeys, three bays, and a rear lean-to. The doorway has a hood on stone brackets, above it is an initialled datestone, and the windows are casements.	II
Brockilow Farmhouse; 53.18036°N 0.92592°W	—	Late 18th century	The farmhouse is in brick, partly rendered, on a plinth, with dentilled eaves and pantile roofs. There are two storeys and attics, and an L-shaped plan, with a main range of five bays. On the front is a doorway, casement windows, those on the ground floor with segmental heads, and blocked openings.	II
Barn, Holme View Farm; 53.19618°N 0.92526°W	—	Late 18th century	A threshing barn in brick with a tile roof. It contains double doors, those on the east side with an elliptical relieving arch, and vents in diamond patterns. Projecting from the left is a lean-to, and from the right is a gabled toilet block.	II
Farm buildings, Ivy House Farm; 53.19579°N 0.92417°W		Late 18th century	The farm buildings consist of a barn and two stables, in brick, with cogged and rebated eaves, and roofs of tile and pantile with a coped and tumbled south gable, and a pedimented east gable. They are in one and two storeys and 16 bays, and have an L-shaped plan. The barn contains doors, vents and a pitching hole, and the stable has casement windows alternating with doorways.	II
Primrose Farmhouse; 53.18286°N 0.89055°W	—	Late 18th century	The farmhouse is in brick with dentilled eaves and a pantile roof. There are two storeys and four bays. The windows are casements, those in the ground floor with segmental heads. To the west is an adjoining outbuilding with a pantile roof and a coped gable with kneelers.	II
Barn, Bar Farm; 53.19664°N 0.91675°W		Early 19th century	The threshing barn, pigeoncote and stable are in brick with stone dressings, rebated eaves, and pantile roofs with pedimented gables. There are six bays, and the buildings are in one and two storeys. The barn contains double doors under a segmental arch, and vents in diamond patterns. To the right is a single-bay pigeoncote with a doorway and a casement window in the ground floor, and above is a square opening with pigeon holes, and further to the right is a stable with a stable door and casement windows.	II
Barn, Brockilow Farm; 53.18020°N 0.92569°W	—	Early 19th century	The barn is in brick on a plinth, with dentilled eaves and a pantile roof. There is a single storey, three bays, and a lean-to the north. The barn contains stable and barn doors, some with segmental heads, a hatch and tiers of vents.	II
Stable, Lilac Farm; 53.19597°N 0.92432°W		19th century	The stable is in brick with a pantile roof, a single storey and three bays. On the west side is a casement window and two stable doors under a continuous timber lintel.	II
Gate piers and gate, St Michael the Archangel's Church; 53.19591°N 0.92140°W		Mid 19th century	The gate piers flanking the entrance to the churchyard are in stone with stepped pyramidal caps, and the gates are in iron. Outside these are curved dwarf walls with chamfered coping and decorative iron railings.	II
Moorhouse Chapel; 53.19281°N 0.87446°W		1860–61	The chapel was designed by Henry Clutton. It is in stone with some brick, and has a tile roof with coped gable and cross finials. The chapel consists of a nave and a chancel under a continuous roof, a south porch and a north vestry. At the junction of the nave and the chancel are buttresses, and on the roof is a gabled bellcote. Most of the windows are single or paired lancets, and in the chancel is a round traceried window.	II*
Laxton Village Hall; 53.19576°N 0.92311°W		Mid to late 19th century	Originally a school, the village hall is in brick on a plinth, with stone dressings, boarded eaves and a hipped pantile roof. There is a single storey and three bays. On the sides are casement windows with mullions, Gothic glazing and hood moulds, and on the north end is a canted bay window with a hipped roof, containing round-headed casement windows with recessed aprons.	II
Laxton Vicarage, service wing and stables 53.19514°N 0.92172°W		1875	The buildings are in brick with stone dressings, on plinths, and have tile roofs with diapering, and gables with bargeboards. The rectory has two storeys and attics, and an irregular double-depth plan. Most of the windows are casements with chamfered surrounds and mullions. On the south front is a conservatory and a canted bay window with a hipped roof. The north front contains a doorway with a moulded shouldered surround, a stair light and a gabled dormer. The service wing to the east has a single storey and contains a datestone. Further to the east is the coach house, which has two storeys and three bays. It contains a central archway flanked by carriage doors, above is a gabled timber pigeoncote, and on the roof is a ventilator with louvres and a pyramidal roof.	II
Laxton War Memorial; 53.19605°N 0.92052°W	—	1920	The war memorial is in the churchyard of St Michael the Archangel's Church, and is in granite. It consists of a square column on a two-stage square base. This is surmounted by a cross under which is a drape, and at the base of the column is a sculpted piece of broken artillery, and sprays of laurel and oak. On the front of the column is an inscription, and on the base are the names of those lost in the First World War.	II
Telephone kiosk 53.19621°N 0.91993°W		1935	The K6 type telephone kiosk in High Street was designed by Giles Gilbert Scott. Constructed in cast iron with a square plan and a dome, it has three unperforated crowns in the top panels.	II
