= Walesby =

Walesby may refer to:

- Walesby, Lincolnshire
- Walesby, Nottinghamshire
