= Jordan's Castle, Wellow =

Site of former castle in North Nottinghamshire

Jordan's Castle
- Location within England Location within the United Kingdom
- Interactive map of Jordan's Castle
- 53°11′30″N 0°59′07″W
- Location: Wellow, Nottinghamshire, England

History
- Built: 13th century

Jordan's Castle is a former fortified manor house site and possible ringwork castle, located near Wellow, Nottinghamshire, England.

Originally owned by the Foliot family. Jordan Foliot was given license to crenellate his manor in 1264.
