= Church of Our Lady of Egmanton =

Church in Nottinghamshire, England

Coordinates: 53°12′44″N 00°53′59″W

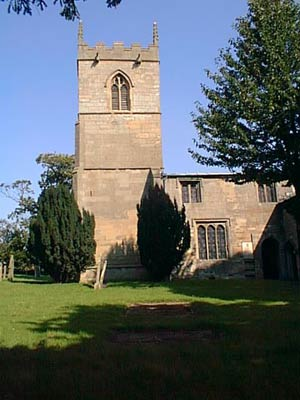
- Church of Our Lady of Egmanton
- Church of Our Lady of Egmanton
- Denomination: Church of England
- Churchmanship: Anglo Catholic
- Website: www.achurchnearyou.com/church/17771/

History
- Dedication: St. Mary

Administration
- Province: York
- Diocese: Southwell and Nottingham
- Parish: Egmanton

The Church of Our Lady of Egmanton (St. Mary's Church) is a Church of England parish church in Egmanton, Nottinghamshire, and the location of the Shrine of Our Lady of Egmanton.

The church is Grade I listed by the Department for Digital, Culture, Media and Sport as a building of outstanding architectural or historic interest.

== History ==
Egmanton appears in a Domesday Book entry for 1085 as among the possessions of Roger de Busli, but there is no mention of a church or priest.

In the early eighteenth century it became the custom in Egmanton for couples who had been married in the church to give a cake to the church bell ringers, who in turn would inscribe their names in the belfry. The list was removed as part of the restoration work done at the end of the 19th century.

A nineteenth century tradition records that it was customary to store a large ham at the church, kept ready for one of the local families, who were accustomed to bury their dead "in ham", i.e., the ham was eaten at a feast after the funeral.

The parish war memorial was unveiled and dedicated on Saturday 20 March 1920.

== Architecture ==
Parts of the church date back to Anglo-Saxon times. The stone building has a chancel, clerestoried nave, a north aisle of four bays, a south transept and a west tower. The windows in the south transept are late fourteenth century. The west tower was built in the 15th century. Romanesque features are a plain south doorway, the north arcade and the font. The three bells in the tower are by the foundry of John Taylor & Co.

== Shrine ==
The shrine of Our Lady of Egmanton is within the parish church. The origin of the shrine is a reported apparition of the Virgin Mary to a local woman in nearby Ladywood, sometime prior to the 12th century. Until its destruction in 1547, the shrine was an object of devout pilgrimage. There are pilgrim crosses scratched by medieval pilgrims to mark the completion of a vow, by the south door and in the north aisle. Pilgrims from the north would traditionally use Egmanton as a stopping-off point as they travelled to Walsingham on pilgrimage.

Modern pilgrimages to the shrine were restarted in 1929. In 1930 Father Alfred Hope Patten, restorer of the shrine of the Anglican Shrine of Our Lady of Walsingham, led a pilgrimage. The Society of Our Lady of Egmanton organizes several pilgrimages every year.

== Restoration ==
The present image of Our Lady of Egmanton, crowned and with the Holy Child, was the work of Sir Ninian Comper and was erected as part of a major restoration in 1896 carried out under the patronage of Henry Pelham-Clinton, 7th Duke of Newcastle.

The restoration by Comper in 1896 to 1898 preserved the building but also introduced several fine features which create the distinctive interior. These include the organ case modelled on the one in the cathedral at Freiburg im Breisgau, the pulpit modelled on that in Ghent. The stained glass windows are also by Comper.

The rood screen was restored in 2005 by Michelle Pepper and was partly funded by a grant from the Nottinghamshire Historic Churches Trust.

== Organ ==
Comper placed the organ above the south door entrance. The organ case is by Comper. The console is on the rood screen. A specification of the organ can be found on the National Pipe Organ Register.

== See also ==
- Grade I listed buildings in Nottinghamshire
- Listed buildings in Egmanton

== Sources ==
- The Buildings of England, Nottinghamshire. Nikolaus Pevsner
