= Laxton Castle =

Castle in Nottinghamshire, United Kingdom

Coordinates: 53.2009°N 0.9236°W

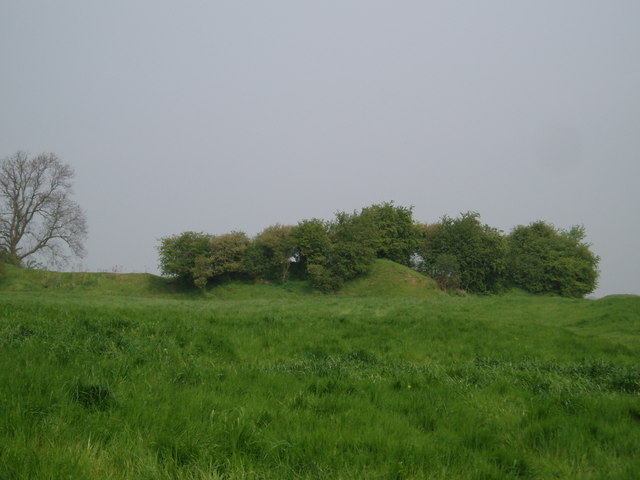
Castle mound at Laxton, Nottinghamshire. The mound is the site of an 11th-century castle which consisted of motte with inner and outer baileys.

Laxton Castle is a late 11th- or early 12th-century medieval castle located north of the village of Laxton in Nottinghamshire, England. According to an early 20th-century report by the British Archaeological Association, the site is notable not only as "the most striking specimen of a mount and court stronghold" in the area, but also for "the nearly perfect condition of its two courts", which made of it a valuable resource for study.

The remaining earthworks and masonry ruins have since 2003 been the subject of study of archaeologists at Birmingham University and the University of Nottingham. The property on which the ruins rest was also the site of a 16th-century manor house known as Laxton Hall.

== Medieval castle ==
The motte-and-bailey castle first built on the spot seems to have been constructed very soon after the Norman Conquest, perhaps under order of Geoffrey Alselin who was granted the property in 1066, though more likely under order of Alselin's son-in-law, Robert de Caux, who used Laxton as his seat after Alselin's death. The construction of the inner courtyard, or bailey, is common for smaller earthwork castles of Norman construction.

The second wave of construction of the castle may have followed the appointment of de Caux to Hereditary Keeper of the Royal Forests of Nottingham and Derbyshire, although the extent of renovations undertaken by King John, who seized the castle for several years in 1204, is unknown. In 1230, the property and title passed to the Everingham family, until they were stripped of the title in 1286; the property found insufficient to sustain the family further, they left it for other property in Yorkshire. The castle subsequently fell into disrepair.

The British Archaeological Association spotlighted the castle's defences, noting:

The greatness of the outer court, the formidable character of the defences of the base court, the placement of the keep-mount on the edge of the steep natural escarpment on the northern side, and the evidence of the guarded track ways to the place, all tend to show the importance of Laxton Castle in the fighting days of its early existence, when feudal lords cared only for what they could get and hold, and had little thought for the rights of their neighbours.

== Laxton Hall ==
In 1408, the Roos family acquired the property, The castle was already in ruins by the 16th century when the family constructed a three-gabled brick manor house there, dubbed "Laxton Hall."

In the 17th and 18th centuries, the property frequently changed hands before coming in 1788 to Charles Pierrepont, 1st Earl Manvers, whose family retained it until 1952, when it was sold to the Ministry of Agriculture.

In 1981, it was purchased by the Crown Estate Commissioners.

== Sources ==
- Laxton Castle
