= St Swithin's Church, Wellow =

St Swithin’s Church, Wellow
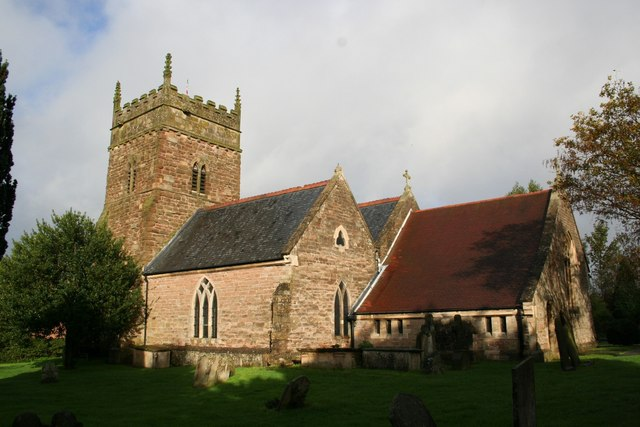
- St Swithin’s Church, Wellow
- St Swithin’s Church, Wellow
- 53°11′16″N 0°59′52″W
- OS grid reference: SK 67074 66100
- Location: Wellow, Nottinghamshire
- Country: England
- Denomination: Church of England

History
- Dedication: St Swithin

Architecture
- Heritage designation: Grade II* listed

Administration
- Diocese: Diocese of Southwell and Nottingham
- Archdeaconry: Newark
- Deanery: Newark and Southwell
- Parish: Wellow

St Swithin's Church, Wellow is a Grade II* listed Church of England parish in the Diocese of Southwell and Nottingham in Wellow, Nottinghamshire.

== History ==
The church dates from the 12th century. It was restored in 1878 by Ewan Christian, and a further restoration took place in 1968.

It is in a group of parishes comprising:

- St Bartholomew's Church, Kneesall
- St Michael the Archangel's Church, Laxton
- Moorhouse Chantry Chapel

== Organ ==
The church has an organ by James Jepson Binns. A specification of the organ can be found on the National Pipe Organ Register.

== Clock ==
The church had an early clock by Richard Roe of Epperstone which was installed in 1699.

== See also ==
- Grade II* listed buildings in Nottinghamshire
- Listed buildings in Wellow, Nottinghamshire
