= Cratley =

Lost village in Nottinghamshire, England

Coordinates: 53.17°N 0.95°W

Cratley is a lost village in Nottinghamshire, England. It may have been located close to North Laithes Farm at Kneesall although an alternative site east of Laund Wood has been suggested. Other names for the settlement are Cratela or Creilage. Two field names on the Estate Map of the Liberty of Rufford i.e. (Rufford Estate) in 1637 are given as East and West Credlin.

The Village of Cratley was listed as Crastell in the Domesday Book as having 22 villeins and 2 bordars, i.e. 22 villagers, 2 smallholders.

4 Ploughlands. 2 Lord's Plough Teams for the Demesne Lands of the Manor, and 9 Men's Plough Teams. Each Plough team had 8 oxen.

Total population in 1086 was 24 households (quite large), Total tax paid by all the owners: 2.5 geld

According to the Domesday Book Tax was paid on 26 Acres of Demesne Meadow Land, and 0.5 leagues of Woodland

Lord of the manor in 1066: Ulf Fenman. Value to the Lord was £6 in 1066. [Lord of the manor in 1086: Gilbert de Gant, who was a Tenant-in-chief of the capital manor, held directly from the Crown.

Head of the Manor: Wellow, which makes Cratley a Sub Manor of the Lordship of Wellow in Nottinghamshire, England.

Soon after the foundation of Rufford Abbey by Gilbert de Gant, on 12 July 1147, the Village of Cratley was reduced to a grange and the villagers gradually evicted and resettled at Wellow.

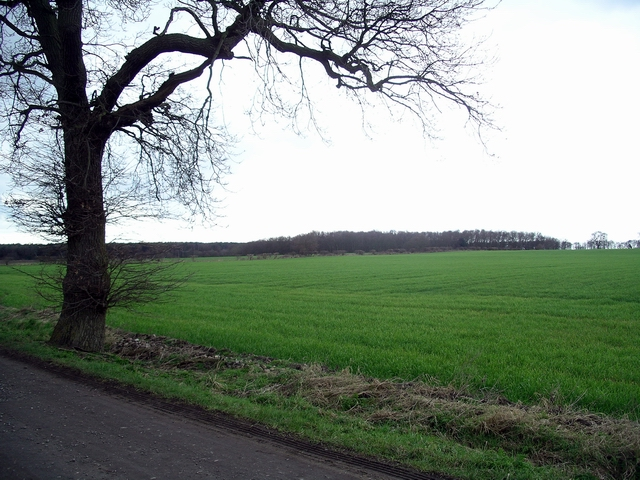
Field at North Laiths Farm.
