= Holy Trinity Church, Kirton =

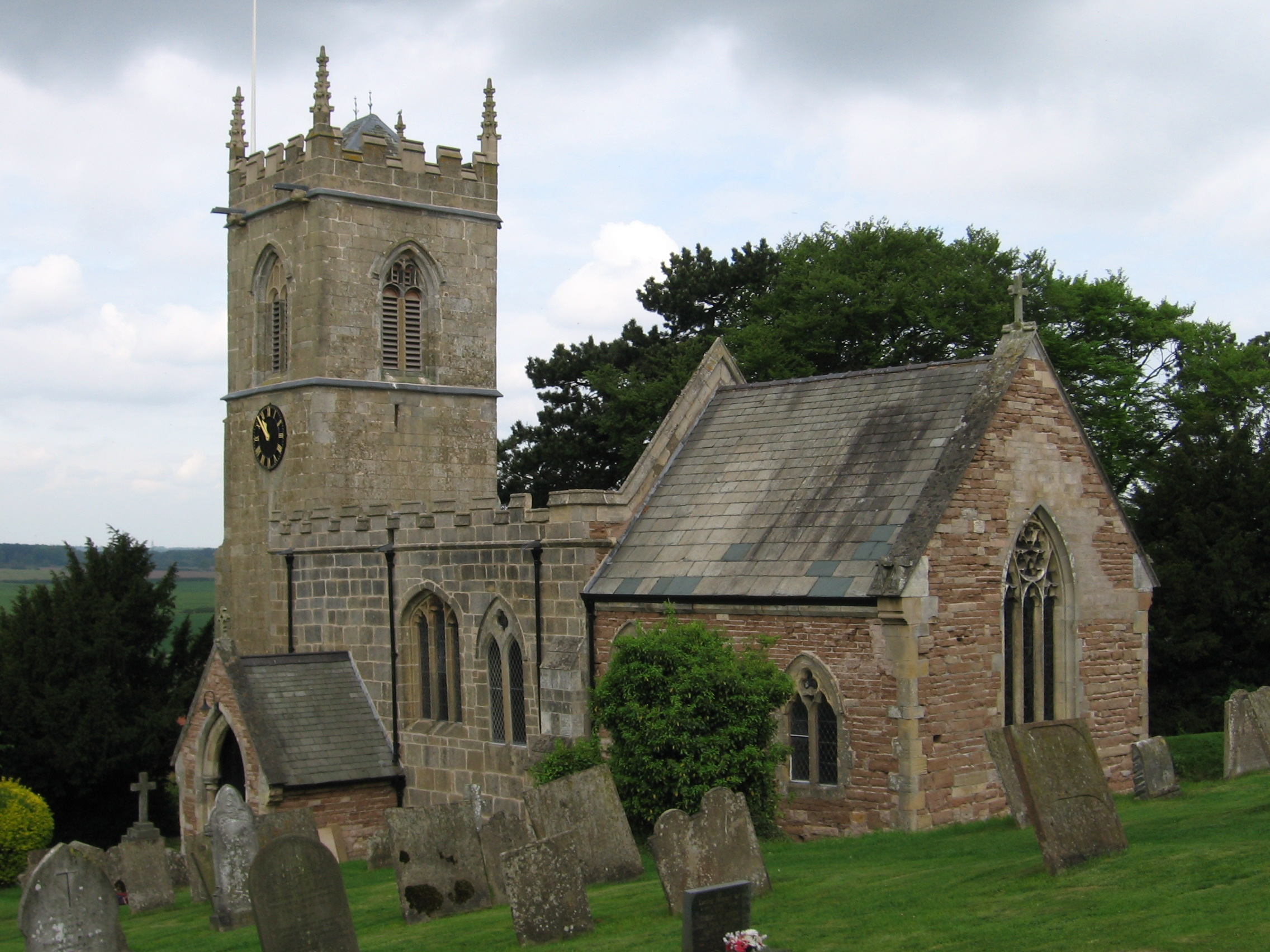
- Holy Trinity Church, Kirton
- Holy Trinity Church, Kirton
- 53°12′59.86″N 0°57′57.2″W
- OS grid reference: SK 69120 69379
- Location: Kirton, Nottinghamshire
- Country: England
- Denomination: Church of England

History
- Dedication: Holy Trinity

Architecture
- Heritage designation: Grade II* listed

Administration
- Diocese: Diocese of Southwell and Nottingham
- Archdeaconry: Newark
- Deanery: Newark and Southwell
- Parish: Kirton

Holy Trinity Church, Kirton is a Grade II* listed parish church in the Church of England in Kirton, Nottinghamshire.

== History ==
The church dates from the 13th century and was restored in 1865.

The lychgate and churchyard wall are Grade II listed. The artist Wright Barker was married here, in 1892.

== See also ==
- Grade II* listed buildings in Nottinghamshire
- Listed buildings in Kirton, Nottinghamshire
