= Listed buildings in Kirton, Nottinghamshire =

Kirton is a civil parish in the Newark and Sherwood district of Nottinghamshire, England. The parish contains four listed buildings that are recorded in the National Heritage List for England. Of these, one is listed at Grade II*, the middle of the three grades, and the others are at Grade II, the lowest grade. The parish contains the village of Kirton and the surrounding area, and the listed buildings consist of a church, its lych gate and boundary wall, and two farmhouses.

== Key ==
Grade	Criteria
II*	Particularly important buildings of more than special interest
II	Buildings of national importance and special interest

== Buildings ==
Name and location	Photograph	Date	Notes	Grade
Holy Trinity Church; 53.21696°N 0.96626°W		13th century	The church has been altered and extended through the centuries, and it was restored in 1865. The church is built in stone, it is partly rendered, and has roofs of lead and slate. It consists of a nave, a north aisle, a south porch, a higher chancel with a north vestry, and a west tower. The tower has two stages, diagonal buttresses, clock faces, a coved string course, an eaves band with gargoyles, and an embattled parapet with corner crocketed pinnacles. The nave also has embattled parapets, and the porch has a 13th-century outer doorway with shafts, it contains stone benches, and the inner doorway has a moulded surround.	II*
Hall Farm House; 53.21490°N 0.96846°W		c. 1630	The farmhouse has brick facing bonded on to stone walls, on plinths, with quoins, and a pantile roof with a stone slate verge. There are two storeys and attics, and an L-shaped plan, with a front range of three bays, and a three-bay rear wing. In the rear wing is a gabled porch and a doorway with a chamfered surround, and the windows are mullioned casements with three or four lights, and hood moulds.	II
Yew Tree Farm House; 53.21668°N 0.96760°W	—	17th century	The farmhouse is timber framed with brick nogging, it is rendered, and has a tile roof. There are two storeys and attics, and an L-shaped plan, with a front range of three bays, and a rear wing and lean-tos. On the front is a doorway with a segmental head, and the windows are a mix of casements, and horizontally-sliding sashes.	II
Lych gate and boundary wall, Holy Trinity Church; 53.21705°N 0.96675°W		1874	The lych gate at the entrance to the churchyard has stone walls, a timber superstructure, and a patterned tile roof with a ridge cross. The walls have a moulded band and chamfered coping, and the gates are in timber and are pierced and panelled.	II
