= Geoffrey Alselin =

English lord

Geoffrey Alselin was an Anglo-Norman, who at some time after the Norman Conquest of England received lands in the Midlands of England.

According to Katharine Keats-Rohan, Geoffrey was a "major tenant-in-chief". His nephew was Ralph de Calz, who inherited Geoffrey's brother's English holdings by the time of Domesday Book. Geoffrey was dead by 1029, when his heir was his son Ralph Halselinus.

Geoffrey began the construction of the motte-and-bailey castle that stood at Laxton, Nottinghamshire, although it would not be completed until after Alselin's son-in-law, Robert de Caux, was appointed the hereditary Keeper of the Royal Forests of Nottingham. The castle would remain in the family's hereditary control until it was transferred, in the reign of King John, to the Everingham family by marriage with the heiress.
