= St Edmund's Church, Walesby =

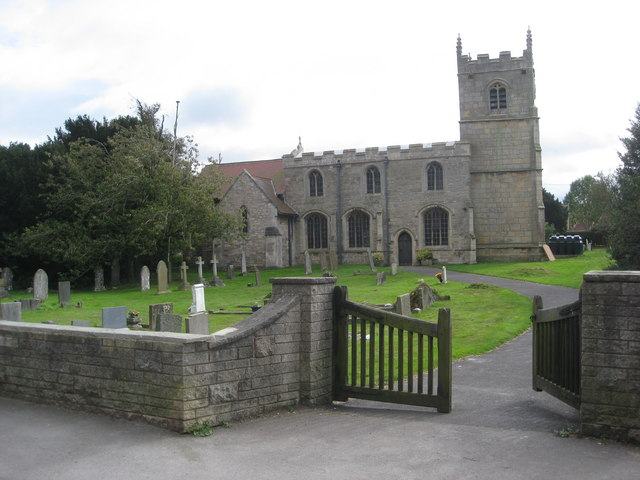
- St Edmund's Church, Walesby
- St Edmund's Church, Walesby
- 53°13′46.75″N 0°58′31.13″W
- OS grid reference: SK 68501 70754
- Location: Walesby, Nottinghamshire
- Country: England
- Denomination: Church of England

History
- Dedication: St Edmund

Architecture
- Heritage designation: Grade II* listed

Administration
- Diocese: Diocese of Southwell and Nottingham
- Archdeaconry: Newark
- Deanery: Newark and Southwell
- Parish: Walesby

St Edmund's Church, Walesby is a Grade II* listed parish church in the Church of England in Walesby, Nottinghamshire.

== History ==
The church was built in the 12th century. It was rebuilt in the 16th century by the Stanhope family, and then in the 17th century, 1886 and 1925.
