= St Bartholomew's Church, Kneesall =

St Bartholomew’s Church, Kneesall
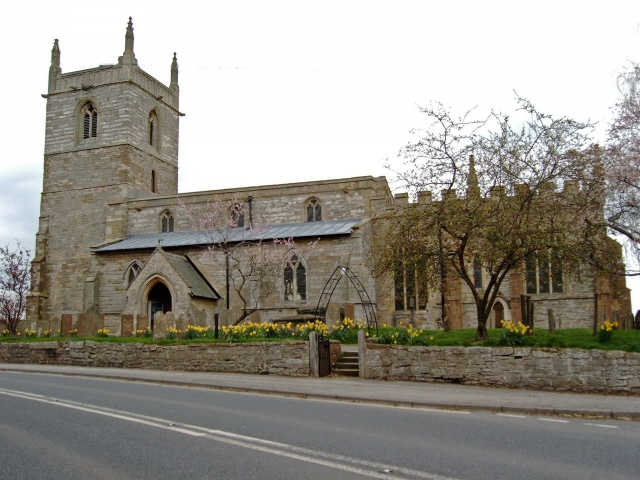
- St Bartholomew’s Church, Kneesall
- St Bartholomew’s Church, Kneesall
- 53°10′13″N 0°56′53″W
- OS grid reference: SK 70417 64198
- Location: Kneesall
- Country: England
- Denomination: Church of England

History
- Dedication: St Bartholomew

Architecture
- Heritage designation: Grade I listed

Administration
- Diocese: Diocese of Southwell and Nottingham
- Archdeaconry: Newark
- Deanery: Newark and Southwell
- Parish: Kneesall

St Bartholomew’s Church, Kneesall is a Grade I listed Church of England parish in the Diocese of Southwell and Nottingham in Kneesall.

== History ==
The church dates from the 14th century. It was restored in 1846 and 1860, then in 1893 by Charles Hodgson Fowler.

It is in a group of parishes comprising:

- St Swithin’s Church, Wellow
- St Michael the Archangel's Church, Laxton
- Moorhouse Chantry Chapel

== Organ ==
The church has an organ by Brindley & Foster. A specification of the organ can be found on the National Pipe Organ Register.
