= Listed buildings in Rufford, Nottinghamshire =

Rufford is a civil parish in the Newark and Sherwood district of Nottinghamshire, England. The parish contains 22 listed buildings that are recorded in the National Heritage List for England. Of these, one is listed at Grade I, the highest of the three grades, one is at Grade II*, the middle grade, and the others are at Grade II, the lowest grade. There is no settlement of any significance in the parish, it being mainly occupied by the estate of Rufford Abbey, its gardens, grounds and parkland. The abbey buildings are listed at Grade I, and almost all the other listed buildings are in the estate.

== Key ==
Grade	Criteria
I	Buildings of exceptional interest, sometimes considered to be internationally important
II*	Particularly important buildings of more than special interest
II	Buildings of national importance and special interest

== Buildings ==
Name and location	Photograph	Date	Notes	Grade
Rufford Abbey; 53.17637°N 1.03562°W		13th century	A Cistercian abbey, converted into a country house in 1560–61, and later altered, including a remodelling in 1838–40 by Anthony Salvin. It consists of a north wing and a house to the south. The north wing is roofless and 10 bays long, with two storeys and an undercroft, and it contains mullioned and transomed windows. On the west front is a four-stage porch tower containing a four-centred arched entrance flanked by barley sugar columns with Corinthian capitals and an entablature. Above this s a cartouche, a three-light window and a parapet with chamfered coping. The house has four storeys and attics, and a south front of six bays, one bay taller and gabled, with a clock face, and an octagonal bell turret with round-headed openings, a bracketed cornice, and an ogee lead roof with a wind vane. The windows are cross windows or are mullioned, and there are gabled dormers.	I
Stable block, Rufford Abbey; 53.17601°N 1.03598°W		Late 17th century	The stable block was rebuilt in the 19th century, and was converted for other purposes in 1980. It is in brick on a chamfered plinth, with quoins, a floor band, an eaves band, moulded and dentilled eaves, and hipped tile roofs. There are two storeys and four ranges around a courtyard, each with six bays, and three of them containing central arches with quoined surrounds and keystones. Above the east arch is a cartouche and a coat of arms, and the windows are paired sashes with chamfered architraves and mullions.	II
Orangery, fountain and wall, Rufford Abbey; 53.17554°N 1.03515°W		1729	A bath summerhouse that was converted into an orangery in 1889. It is in brick and stone and roofless, and has one and two storeys, three unequal bays, and a rectangular plan. On the north side is a central doorway with an elliptical head, pilasters, and an entablature with an inscribed, shaped, dated and crested gable. At the east end is a three-bay Tuscan loggia, and a canted bay window flanked by three-stage square towers, and a fountain.	II*
Garden urn (east), Rufford Abbey; 53.17607°N 1.03498°W		18th century	The urn is in stone on a rendered chamfered square brick plinth. It has a stepped square base, a ringed octagonal stem, a vase-shaped octagonal body, and four scallops forming a crest. The urn is flanked by single mermaid supporters.	II
Garden urn (north), Rufford Abbey; 53.17632°N 1.03479°W		18th century	The urn is in stone on a rendered chamfered square brick plinth. It has a stepped square base, a ringed octagonal stem, a vase-shaped octagonal body, and four scallops forming a crest. The urn is flanked by single mermaid supporters.	II
Garden urn (northeast), Rufford Abbey; 53.17777°N 1.03485°W		18th century	The urn is in stone on a rendered chamfered square brick plinth. It has a stepped square base, a ringed octagonal stem, a vase-shaped octagonal body, and four scallops forming a crest. The urn is flanked by single mermaid supporters.	II
Garden urn (northwest), Rufford Abbey; 53.17774°N 1.03628°W		18th century	The urn is in stone on a rendered chamfered square brick plinth. It has a stepped square base, a ringed octagonal stem, a vase-shaped octagonal body, and four scallops forming a crest. The urn is flanked by single mermaid supporters.	II
Garden urn (60 metres west), Rufford Abbey; 53.17652°N 1.03666°W		18th century	The urn is in stone on a rendered chamfered square brick plinth. It has a stepped square base, a ringed octagonal stem, a vase-shaped octagonal body, and four scallops forming a crest. The urn is flanked by single mermaid supporters.	II
Garden urn (62 metres west), Rufford Abbey; 53.17640°N 1.03667°W		18th century	The urn is in stone on a rendered chamfered square brick plinth. It has a stepped square base, a ringed octagonal stem, a vase-shaped octagonal body, and four scallops forming a crest. The urn is flanked by single mermaid supporters.	II
Major Icehouse, Rufford Abbey; 53.18044°N 1.03770°W		Mid 18th century	The icehouse is in brick and stone, and has a single bay and an octagonal plan. The east front has walls flanking a splayed round-headed relieving arch containing a rebated round-headed doorway. The interior is octagonal and about 7 metres (23 ft) in diameter.	II
Sawmill and outbuildings, Rufford Abbey; 53.18303°N 1.03284°W		c. 1758	A corn mill converted into a sawmill in about 1865, and later extended, it is in brick, partly rendered, on a stone plinth, with chamfered rusticated quoins, moulded and dentilled eaves, a moulded cornice and pediment a coped parapet, and roof of slate and tile. There are two storeys and five bays, the middle bay projecting under a pediment. In the centre is a round-headed doorway with a quoined surround, and the windows are sashes. At the rear is a segmental-headed wheel opening with a quoined surround. The east wing has two storeys and six bays, and contains sash windows with architraves and keystones.	II
Minor Icehouse, Rufford Abbey; 53.17940°N 1.03982°W		Early 19th century	The icehouse is in brick, and has a round plan and an oval section. The entrance has a round-headed doorway with a concrete lintel. The interior is round with a flat floor and a domed top, and is about 4 metres (13 ft) in diameter.	II
Garden House, Rufford Abbey; 53.17549°N 1.03550°W	—	1838–40	The cottage, designed by Anthony Salvin, is in brick with deep bracketed eaves and a tile roof. There are two storeys, two bays, and a square plan. The windows are cross and mullioned casements. On the front is a lean-to porch, and a doorway with rebated pilasters and a cornice on curved brackets. Above it is a panel on a strapwork bracket with a hood mould, containing an initial, and over that is a panel with a coat of arms.	II
West Lodge; 53.17665°N 1.04266°W		1841	The lodge, designed by Anthony Salvin, is in stone on a chamfered plinth, with chamfered eaves, and a Westmorland slate roof with coped gables and kneelers. There is a single storey and attics, and a cruciform plan with a front of three bays. In the centre of the east front is a projecting bay containing a canted bay window with a moulded cornice and a strapwork crest with ball finials. In the left return is a doorway with a moulded surround, a four-centred arched head and a hood mould. The windows are cross and mullioned casements, and in the south gable is a datestone.	II
West gate, screen wall and fence posts, Rufford Abbey; 53.17663°N 1.04229°W		1841–43	Designed by Anthony Salvin, the entrance is flanked by stone gate piers that have chamfered rustication, chamfered plinths, and moulded cornices. The main piers have round-headed recesses with strapwork bands and mask keystones. Above is a strapwork band, and a rectangular base, on which is an achievement with a swan crest and eagle supporters. Between the piers are wrought iron gates with an ornate overthrow and a monogram. Outside the main piers are two pairs of smaller piers with obelisks on scroll brackets with ball finials, and at the ends are piers with strapwork bands, and concave square caps with ball finials. Between the piers are dwarf walls with chamfered coping and ornate spearhead railings. Beyond the end piers are two guard stones with domed tops, and 22 octagonal stone fence posts with iron ball finials, and between them is a spiked chain fence.	II
Pigeoncote and kennels, North Laiths Farm; 53.16859°N 1.00421°W		Mid 19th century	The pigeoncote and kennels are in brick with moulded dentilled eaves, and slate roofs with a pedimented gable and a conical roof. There are two storeys and a loft, and a single bay. In the south front are round-headed doorways in both floors and the loft, and round pigeonholes with shelves. The conical roof has four lucarnes and a wind vane.	II
Park Lodge; 53.16158°N 1.03038°W		Mid 19th century	The lodge is in rendered brick with decorative bands and embattled parapets. There are two storeys, five unequal bays, and a U-shaped plan. In the centre of the main block is a doorway flanked by bow windows, and the other windows are casements with pointed heads.	II
Wellow Lodge; 53.18494°N 1.01898°W		Mid 19th century	The lodge is in stone, and yellow and red brick, on a chamfered brick plinth, with dentilled eaves, stone cornice gutters, and patterned tile roofs with stepped coped gables and kneelers. There is a single storey and an attic, and a T-shaped plan, with two bays. The windows are casements in splayed brick reveals with chamfered stone lintels. On the east front is a gabled wing with a canted bay window, above which is a cartouche with an owl. To the right is a porch containing a doorway with a stepped head containing an initialled shield.	II
Brewhouse, bothy and wall, Rufford Abbey; 53.17554°N 1.03571°W		Late 19th century	The buildings, which have been converted for residential use, are in stone with hipped tile roofs. The brewhouse has two storeys, five bays, and bracketed eaves. It contains casement windows, doorways, one with a chamfered surround, and a louvred gabled dormer. The bothy, in a similar style, has a single storey and two bays, and the adjoining wall is in brick with stone coping, and two lean-to brick buildings with pantile roofs.	II
Coach house and wall, Rufford Abbey; 53.17572°N 1.03553°W		Late 19th century	The coach house, which has been converted for other uses, is in stone and brick, with deep eaves on concrete brackets and a tile roof. It is in a single and two storeys, and has six bays, and two gabled rear wings. On the front are six carriage openings with chamfered surrounds, and a mix of mullioned and cross-casement windows. On the west front is a square tower with two stages, a doorway with a chamfered surround, a floor band, bracketed eaves, and a concave hipped roof. The boundary wall has shaped stone coping, and contains an elliptical archway, with a chamfered surround, a stepped coped gable, and a panel with a blank shield on each side.	II
School House; 53.17312°N 1.03890°W		Late 19th century	The school and master's house are in brick with tile-hanging, on a plinth with chamfered stone coping, with a sill band, a moulded floor band, bargeboards on curved brackets, and a tile roof. It is in one and two storeys and has four bays. The left bay projects and is gabled, and to the right is a gabled porch. The doorway has a moulded surround and a Tudor arch, and in the porch is a doorway with a moulded surround and a hood mould. Most of the windows are casements, and there is a gabled dormer.	II
Water tower and wall, Rufford Abbey; 53.17545°N 1.03590°W		Late 19th century	The water tower is in brick with stone dressings, and has a bracketed eaves band with foliate corner brackets. There is a square plan and five stages. The windows are unglazed and have projecting architraves, and to the north is a doorway with a chamfered surround. To the west is a single-storey single-bay building containing a doorway with a segmental head. The boundary wall is in brick and stone with shaped stone coping, it has a semicircular plan, contains two gateways, and is about 60 metres (200 ft) long.	II
