= Listed buildings in Wellow, Nottinghamshire =

Wellow is a civil parish in the Newark and Sherwood district of Nottinghamshire, England. The parish contains eleven listed buildings that are recorded in the National Heritage List for England. Of these, one is listed at Grade II*, the middle of the three grades, and the others are at Grade II, the lowest grade. The parish contains the village of Wellow and the surrounding area. All the listed buildings are in the village, and consist of houses and associated structures, farmhouses and farm buildings, a church, and tombs in the churchyard.

== Key ==
Grade	Criteria
II*	Particularly important buildings of more than special interest
II	Buildings of national importance and special interest

== Buildings ==
Name and location	Photograph	Date	Notes	Grade
St Swithin's Church; 53.18777°N 0.99760°W		12th century	The church has been altered and extended through the centuries, including a restoration and the replacement of the chancel in 1876–78. The church is built in stone with roofs of tile and slate, and consists of a nave, a south aisle, a south porch, a chancel, a vestry and a southwest tower. The tower has three stages, buttresses, two string courses, a dentilled band, coved eaves, gargoyles, and an embattled parapet with four crocketed pinnacles. In the west side is a restored 13th-century doorway with a hood mould, above is a lancet window and a clock face, and double-lancet bell openings.	II*
Rock House and stable range 53.18895°N 0.99826°W		17th century	The house and adjoining stable range are partly timber framed with brick nogging, and partly in brick and rendered, on a stone plinth, with a tile roof. The house has two storeys and attics, and three bays, and the upper floor of the gable end facing the street is jettied. The windows are casements, some with segmental heads. The stable range has a single storey and a loft, three bays and a single-bay lean-to. It contains a casement window, a stable door, garage doors and vents.	II
Tomb slab 53.18777°N 0.99742°W	—	1651	The slab from an altar tomb originally in the church is in the churchyard of St Swithin's Church to the east of the church, and is to the memory of Alice Braylesford. It is in stone, and incised with arms and scrollwork, and a partly illegible inscription.	II
Wellow Hall and stable range 53.18911°N 0.99967°W		1700	A country house that has been extended and divided into two, it is in brick, partly rendered and colourwashed, on a chamfered plinth, with stone dressings, and a slate roof with coped gables and kneelers. There are two storeys and attics and an L-shaped plan, with a front range of five bays, and a rear wing with seven bays, beyond which is a two-bay block. The windows are a mix of sashes and casements, on the west front is an oriel window and two dormers, and elsewhere are bay windows, one square and the other canted with two storeys. In an angle at the rear is a gabled porch and a datestone, and outside is an iron pump with a domed head. The stable block at the rear has a central two-storey carriage house, single-storey wings and three bays, and it contains a pair of elliptical-headed carriage doorways, and a Diocletian window.	II
Boundary wall, Wellow Hall; 53.18902°N 0.99943°W		18th century	The wall is in brick with ramped coping in stone and brick. It has an L-shaped plan, with a rounded corner at the east end, and extends for about 170 metres (560 ft).	II
Highfield House; 53.18890°N 0.99800°W		Mid 18th century	A brick house on a partial rendered plinth, with a floor band, cogged eaves and a pantile roof. There are two storeys and attics, three bays, and a rear outshut. In the centre is a doorway with a fanlight, the ground floor windows are sashes, in the upper floor are casement windows, and all the openings have rendered splayed lintels.	II
Farm House; 53.18881°N 0.99750°W		Late 18th century	The farmhouse is in brick with dentilled eaves and a tile roof. There are two storeys and attics and an L-shaped plan, with a front range of three bays. In the centre is a doorway with a fanlight, the windows on the front are sash windows, and elsewhere are casement windows and horizontally-sliding sashes. All the openings have segmental heads.	II
Lodge Farm House; 53.18776°N 0.99893°W		Late 18th century	The farmhouse is in brick on a partial rendered stone plinth, with dentilled eaves and pantile roofs. There are two storeys and attics, and an L-shaped plan, with a front range of two bays. The doorway has a moulded surround, a blocked fanlight and a small hood. The windows on the front are sashes with segmental heads, and in the right gable are casement windows and a horizontally-sliding sash window.	II
Manor Farmhouse; 53.18875°N 0.99816°W		Late 18th century	The farmhouse is in brick with dentilled eaves and a pantile roof. There are two storeys, a cellar and attics, and an L-shaped plan with a front range of three bays. In the centre is a doorway with plain jambs a reeded lintel, a fanlight, and a panelled hood on curved brackets, and there is a cellar light to the left. Most of the windows are cross casements with rubbed brick heads. At the rear is a single-storey three-bay outbuilding.	II
Chest tombs 53.18771°N 0.99756°W		1803	The two chest tombs are in the churchyard of St Swithin's Church to the south of the chancel, and are to the memory of members of the Vessey family. The older tomb is a triple tomb with moulded corners, a central blank panel on the north and south sides, and three smaller blank panels on the east end. The other is a single tomb dated 1819, and has reeded corners, a hipped top, and an inscribed panel on each long side. The tombs are enclosed by a chamfered stone kerb.	II
Chailey House; 53.19044°N 1.00432°W	—	1876	The house is in brick on a chamfered plinth, with stone dressings, a moulded corbelled jetty to the north, elaborate bargeboards with drop finials, rainwater heads with owl motifs, and a tile roof. There are two storeys, three bays, and a square plan. The windows are latticed casements with mullions and transoms. In the centre is a gabled porch, above which is a plaque with an owl, and at the rear is a datestone.	II
