= St Michael the Archangel's Church, Laxton =

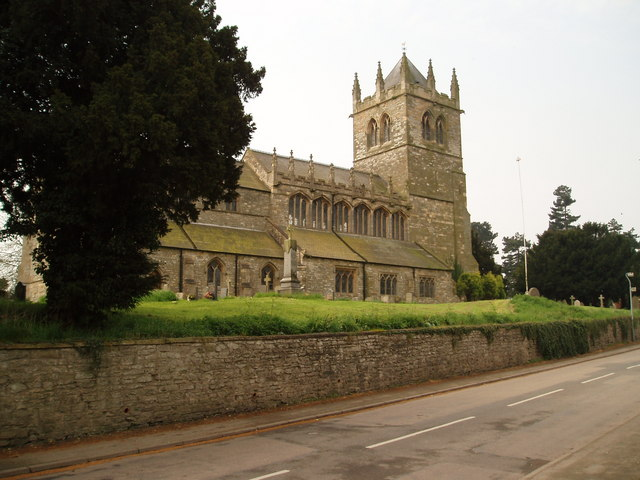
- St Michael the Archangel's Church, Laxton
- St Michael the Archangel's Church, Laxton
- 53°11′45″N 0°55′15″W
- OS grid reference: SK 72200 67068
- Location: Laxton, Nottinghamshire
- Country: England
- Denomination: Church of England

History
- Dedication: St Michael the Archangel

Architecture
- Heritage designation: Grade I listed

Administration
- Diocese: Diocese of Southwell and Nottingham
- Archdeaconry: Newark
- Deanery: Newark and Southwell
- Parish: Laxton

St Michael the Archangel’s Church, Laxton is a Grade I listed Church of England parish in the Diocese of Southwell and Nottingham in Laxton, Nottinghamshire.

== History ==
The church dates from the 13th century. It was the home church of the Everingham Barons in the thirteenth and fourteenth centuries and contains several of their stone monuments.

It was restored in 1859 and 1860 by Thomas Chambers Hine and Robert Evans.

It is in a group of parishes comprising:

- St Swithin’s Church, Wellow
- St Bartholomew’s Church, Kneesall
- Moorhouse Chantry Chapel

== Organ ==
The church has an organ dating from 1870 by Wadsworth. A specification of the organ can be found on the National Pipe Organ Register.

== See also ==
- Grade I listed buildings in Nottinghamshire
- Listed buildings in Laxton and Moorhouse
