= Listed buildings in Egmanton =

Egmanton is a civil parish in the Newark and Sherwood district of Nottinghamshire, England. The parish contains eight listed buildings that are recorded in the National Heritage List for England. Of these, one is listed at Grade I, the highest of the three grades, and the others are at Grade II, the lowest grade. The parish contains the village of Egmanton and the surrounding area. The listed buildings consist of a church, a sundial and a war memorial in the churchyard, a house, three farmhouses, and a barn.

== Key ==
Grade	Criteria
I	Buildings of exceptional interest, sometimes considered to be internationally important
II	Buildings of national importance and special interest

== Buildings ==
Name and location	Photograph	Date	Notes	Grade
St Mary's Church; 53.21226°N 0.89939°W		11th century	The church has been altered and extended through the centuries. It is in stone with roofs of lead and slate, and consists of a nave with a clerestory, a north aisle, a south transept, a chancel, a north vestry and a west tower. The tower has three stages, a plinth, buttresses, two string courses, an eaves band with two gargoyles, and an embattled parapet with four crocketed pinnacles. On the west side is a doorway with a moulded surround, above which is a round-headed triple lancet window with a hood mould. In the middle stage are stair lights, and the bell openings have two lights and hood moulds. Much of the internal decoration is by Ninian Comper.	I
Stone House; 53.21198°N 0.90573°W		1734	The house is in stone on a plinth, with moulded eaves, and a pantile roof with coped gables and kneelers. There are two storeys and an attic, and an L-shaped plan, with a front range of three bays, a lean-to on the left, and a rear extension in brick under a catslide roof. In the centre is a doorway with a moulded quoined surround. Above it is a datestone, and the windows on the front are three-light casements with mullions.	II
North Farmhouse; 53.21283°N 0.89849°W	—	Mid 18th century	The farmhouse was extensively extended in 1899. It is in brick with floor bands, cogged eaves, and roofs of pantile and slate, There are two storeys and an L-shaped plan, with a front of five unequal bays. The doorway has a round-arched head, a keystone and a hood. Most of the windows are casements, some with segmental heads.	II
Barn southeast of Stone House; 53.21177°N 0.90534°W		18th century	A threshing barn in brick with dentilled eaves and a pantile roof. There is a single storey and three bays. On the front is a large doorway, there is a smaller doorway at the rear, and on each front are slit vents.	II
Sundial; 53.21217°N 0.89933°W		18th century	The sundial in the churchyard of St Mary's Church is in stone. It consists of a tapered round shaft on a square base, with a moulded square top, on a square base of three steps.	II
Island Farmhouse; 53.21106°N 0.90310°W		Late 18th century	The farmhouse is in brick on a plinth, with a floor band, dentilled eaves and a pantile roof. There are two storeys with attics, and an L-shaped plan, with a front range of three bays. The central doorway has a dummy semicircular fanlight, an entablature, and a dentilled pedimented hood. Most of the windows are sashes, those on the front with segmental heads.	II
Portland Farmhouse; 53.21026°N 0.90189°W	—	Early 19th century	The farmhouse is in brick on a chamfered plinth, with floor bands, dentilled eaves, and a tile roof. There are three storeys and an L-shaped plan, with a front range of three bays, and a rear wing and a lean-to. On the front is a canted porch with a slate roof. The windows on the front are sashes, and elsewhere there are casement windows.	II
War memorial 53.21227°N 0.89909°W		1920	The war memorial is in the churchyard of St Mary's Church, and is in limestone. It consists of a cross with a sword of sacrifice in relief on the front, on a plinth and a three-stepped square base. On the front are inscriptions and the names of those lost in thee First World War.	II
