= Moorhouse, Nottinghamshire =

Hamlet in Nottinghamshire, England

Coordinates: 53.191204°N 0.874784°W

Moorhouse
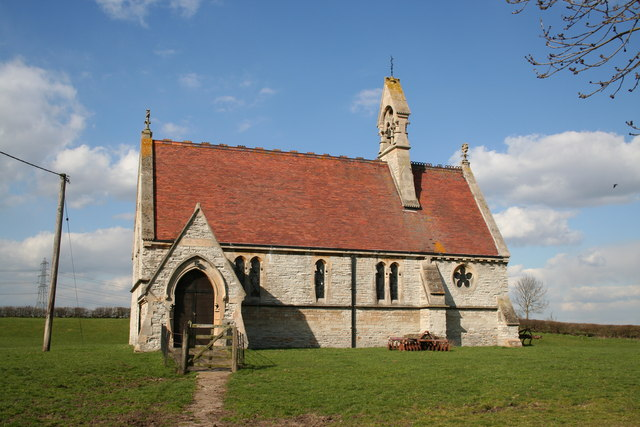
- Moorhouse Chapel

- Location within Nottinghamshire
- Interactive map of Moorhouse
- Population: 251 (2021) including Laxton
- OS grid reference: SK 75278 66604
- Civil parish: Laxton and Moorhouse
- District: Newark and Sherwood
- Shire county: Nottinghamshire
- Region: East Midlands
- Country: England
- Sovereign state: United Kingdom
- Post town: NEWARK
- Postcode district: NG23
- Police: Nottinghamshire
- Fire: Nottinghamshire
- Ambulance: East Midlands
- UK Parliament: Newark

Moorhouse or Laxton Moorhouse is a hamlet within the Laxton and Moorhouse parish, in the Newark and Sherwood district of central Nottinghamshire, England.

== Geography and demography ==
The area is 2 miles east of Laxton, and 20 miles north east of Nottingham. Predominantly, it is a scattering of farms, farmhouses and cottages amongst a wider rural setting. These are grouped around three roads meeting by a single junction: Green Lane, Moorhouse Lane, and Ossington Lane. In the Census 2021 reports, the population of the wider parish of Laxton and Moorhouse was 251.

The Moorhouse Beck stream runs through the village, rising from several locations in the south of the parish. The village lies in a shallow valley, at 84 feet (26 m) with the surrounding land higher except towards the east. The nearest forested feature is East Park Wood, around 1 kilometre (0.62 mi) northwest of the village.

== History ==
=== Toponymy ===
The name Moorhouse was a local name meaning the inhabitant at the house on the moorland. Known as Morhus by 1231, it derived from elements of the Old English words mor, meaning marsh or fen, and hus, meaning house. Later interpretations included Morhuses in 1232, and through local association Laxton (or Lexington) Morehouse by 1324.

=== Local chronology ===
The Moorhouse area changed hands several times throughout the years, William the Conqueror granting the manor first to Geoffrey Alselin in 1066. Sir William Courten was a later owner who commissioned a survey of the Laxton and Moorhouse lands, with cartographer Mark Pierce drafting for him a well-regarded 1635 map demonstrating extensive use of the open field system. Moorhouse was partially within an 'East Field' and mainly located within the 'North Field', with some of those inhabitants also farming the South Field at Laxton.

The fields around Moorhouse were eventually enclosed from 1860 through the Moorhouse Enclosure Act, with much of the property under the John Denison Ossington Estate by the turn of the 20th century. The ownership of the rest was shared with the Earl of Scarborough, and Earl Manvers Pierrepont family notably on Church Farm until 1950 when the 6th Earl sold it to their tenants. Most of the Laxton manor was sold to the Ministry of Agriculture in 1952, with a further sale to the Crown Estate in 1981. It was sold back to the Earl Manvers Thoresby Estate in 2020.

As well as the Moorhouse chapel, there was also a small Methodist chapel which has been unused as such in recent times.

In 1990, the Laxton parish name was changed to include Moorhouse.

== Economy ==
Farming is the key industry with much of the available land and buildings used to support this activity.

There is a bed and breakfast facility at a 17th-century cottage within the village.

Metal fabrication services are also provided for locally.

== Landmarks ==
=== Moorhouse Chapel ===
The Moorhouse Chantry Chapel is a key feature in the area, just north east of the road junction. It is dedicated to Saint Nicholas, and was erected in 1861 using a Gothic style, by John Evelyn Denison of nearby Ossington Hall who was a local landowner. It is believed that there was an original chapel on the same site built for the private use of Robert de Lexington early in the thirteenth century, with the bell being reused in the replacement church.

=== Listed buildings ===
As well as the church (Grade II*), there are two other listed buildings (Grade II) within the village:

- Church Farmhouse on Church Lane
- Aggrie House on Green Lane
