= Laxton, Nottinghamshire =

Village in Nottinghamshire, England

Coordinates: 53.196°N 0.920°W

Laxton
- Village
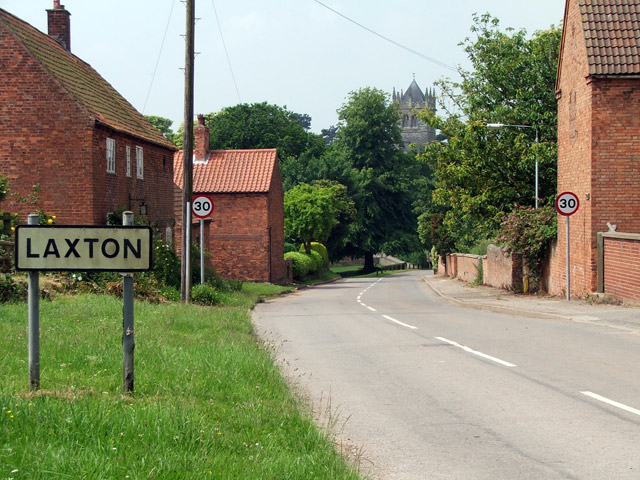

- Location within Nottinghamshire
- Population: 251 (2021 - parish including Moorhouse)
- OS grid reference: SK717673
- Civil parish: Laxton and Moorhouse
- District: Newark and Sherwood
- Shire county: Nottinghamshire
- Region: East Midlands
- Country: England
- Sovereign state: United Kingdom
- Post town: NEWARK
- Postcode district: NG22
- Police: Nottinghamshire
- Fire: Nottinghamshire
- Ambulance: East Midlands
- UK Parliament: Newark

Laxton is a village in the civil parish of Laxton and Moorhouse, in the Newark and Sherwood district, in the English county of Nottinghamshire, situated about 25 miles northeast of Nottingham city centre. The population of the civil parish (including Moorhouse) at the 2021 census was 251.

== Toponymy ==
Laxton is best known for having the last remaining working open field system in the United Kingdom. Its name is recorded first in the Domesday Book of 1086 as Laxintone, and may come from Anglo-Saxon Leaxingatūn, meaning the 'farmstead or estate of the people of a man called Leaxa.' It is possibly the eponym of the town of Lexington, Massachusetts, and thus ultimately of all the other communities named Lexington in the United States, directly or indirectly.

== History ==
The village has the remains of a Norman motte and bailey castle (Laxton Castle) and is also the site of the Beth Shalom Holocaust Centre. In addition, there are the remnants of a substantial system of fish-ponds, presumed to have belonged to the castle or to the manor house built later on the site of it, two mediæval mill mounds, and ridge-and-furrow earthworks. St Michael the Archangel's Church, Laxton, mostly dates back to the 12th century; after this, the earliest known standing structure is a farmhouse dating from 1703. Most of the village's architecture sits firmly in the local vernacular tradition, with nearly a fifth of the buildings dating from the 18th century, and around 40% from each of the 19th and 20th.

=== Conservation status of Laxton ===
"Laxton Fields" has been designated a target area for Higher Level Stewardship by Natural England to promote conservation of the historic landscape and biodiversity.

=== Open fields ===
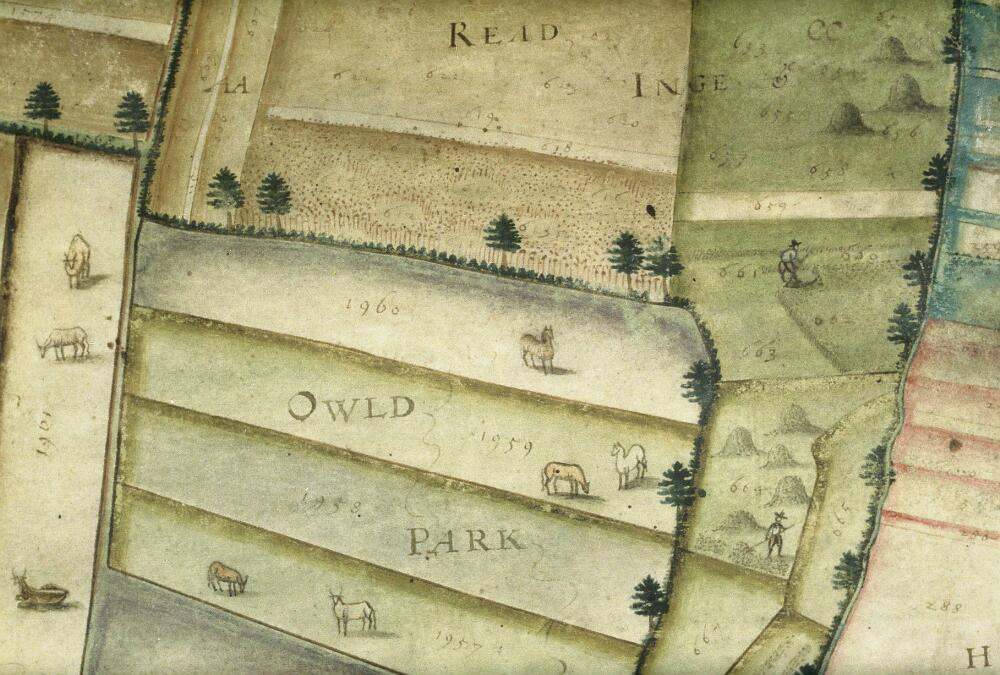
1635 map of Laxton- Owld Park (south of Kneesall) showing the agricultural entitlements and situation by numbers that would correspond to entries in the Estate Terrier to indicate ownership.

Laxton parish today has much conventionally farmed land but retains also a significant part of the mediaeval open field system. Fields, divided into strips, are farmed in common among the landowners of the village. Today, there are three open fields remaining; the Mill Field, the South Field and the West Field. A 1635 survey of the parish carried out by Mark Pierce (still extant and held in the Bodleian Library) shows that these three fields were in use at that date, but that they were significantly larger than their current size. There was also a fourth field, the East Field, which was considerably smaller than the others, and farmed as part of the West Field. This was fully enclosed, and today is a number of small fields.

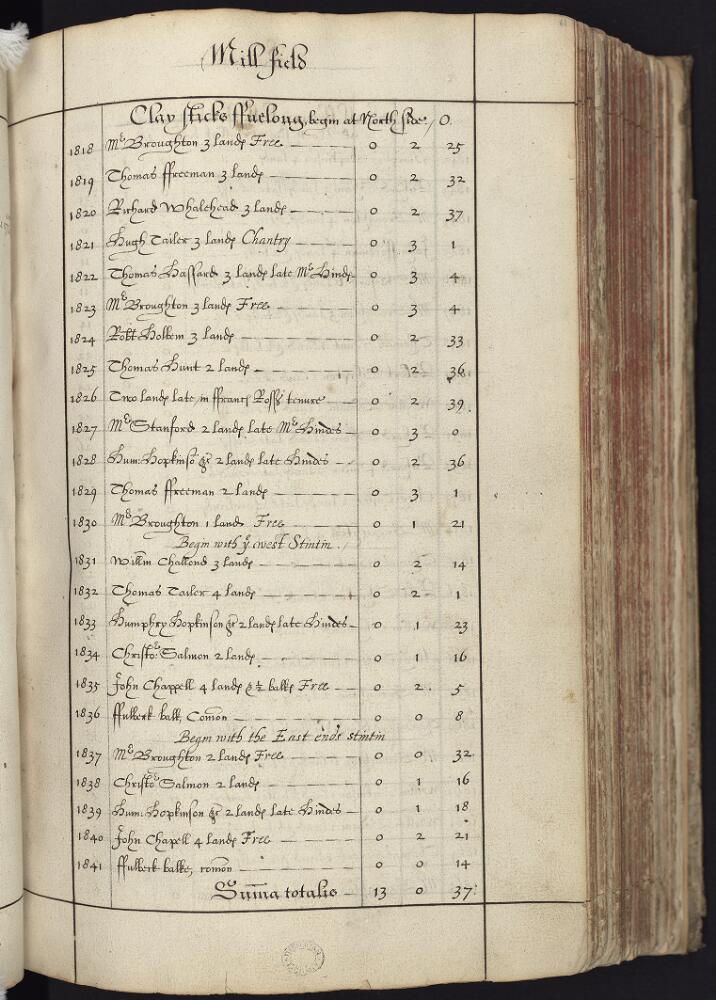
Terrier ledger to be correlated to the Laxton maps. Parcel numbers seen on the maps are linked to the owner's name.

The strips within the fields have also changed significantly, with changes in technology. Originally, a single strip would have represented approximately a single day of ploughing; such a strip today would be far too small to be really practical for a tractor-drawn plough. Instead, over time, strips have been consolidated to provide workable parcels of land; the result today is that the average strip size has increased significantly over mediaeval times. However, the practical aspects of open field farming are still very much what they would have been 500 years ago.

Laxton is unique because the open field system is still alive and in daily use. Although the village is now recognised as an important heritage site, it is home to working farmers, who rely on the land for their income. While modern expectations and needs mean that all the farmers own land outside the open fields, the open fields are not part of a museum or showcase but a living part of the agricultural landscape. The system is protected today by a parliamentary undertaking given by the Thoresby Estate on their 2020 repurchase of the Laxton estate from the Crown Estate and by a countryside stewardship agreement held between the court leet and the then-Countryside Commission. The sykes, four areas of grassland, are also protected by SSSI status.

Laxton's strip fields were depicted on a postage stamp designed by David Tress that was issued in 1999 by the Royal Mail as part of their Millennium stamp series; the stamp also doubled as Royal Mail's contribution to that year's Europa postage stamp issue with the theme of Parks and Reserves.

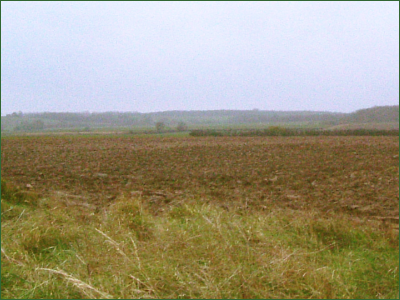
View across Laxton's open fields

=== Moorhouse ===
Moorhouse is a hamlet 2 miles east of Laxton, but within the wider parish area, Previously known as Laxton Morehouse, it is a scattering of farms, farmhouses and cottages amongst a wider rural setting. These are grouped around three roads meeting by a single junction: Green Lane, Moorhouse Lane, and Ossington Lane. It maintains a notable Grade II* Anglican chapel.

== National Holocaust Centre and Museum ==
=== Beth Shalom ===
Opened in September 1995, the National Holocaust Centre and Museum (previously known as Beth Shalom) was the first venue in Britain dedicated to the Holocaust as its primary purpose. The venue is based around an old farm house (grid reference SK700670) which has a purpose-built exhibition centre with lecture theatre, and a Memorial Garden. A feature of the garden is a black stone on which are inscribed the names of the Nazi death camps.

The vision for the centre came when James and Stephen Smith visited Israel with their parents. Some time later, on another visit, they saw Yad Vashem in Jerusalem, and were inspired to build a memorial in Britain.

The centre is also home to the Aegis Trust, an all-party group working for genocide prevention. One of their interests is in Kigali, Rwanda.

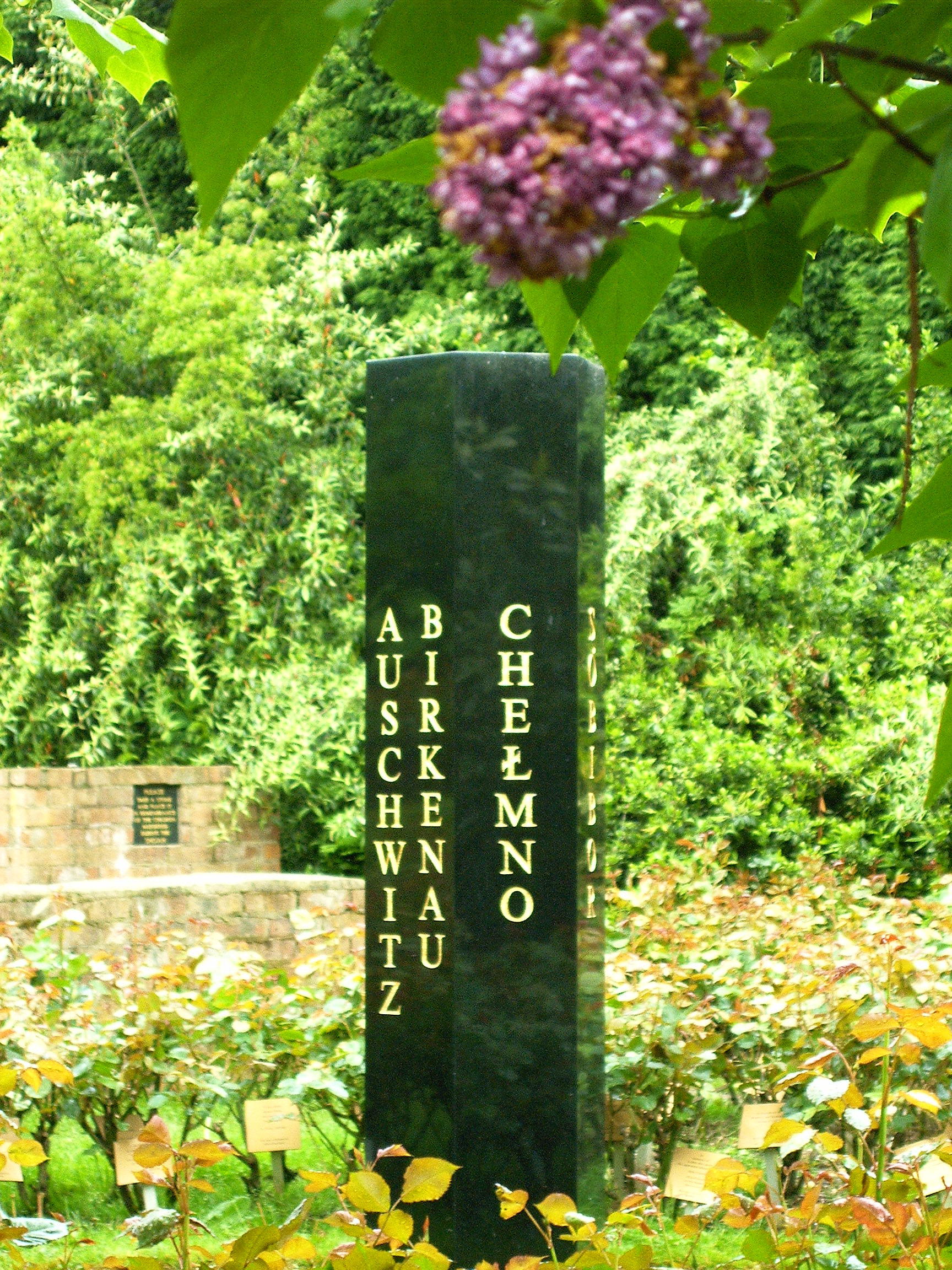
Holocaust Memorial at Beth Shalom, Laxton

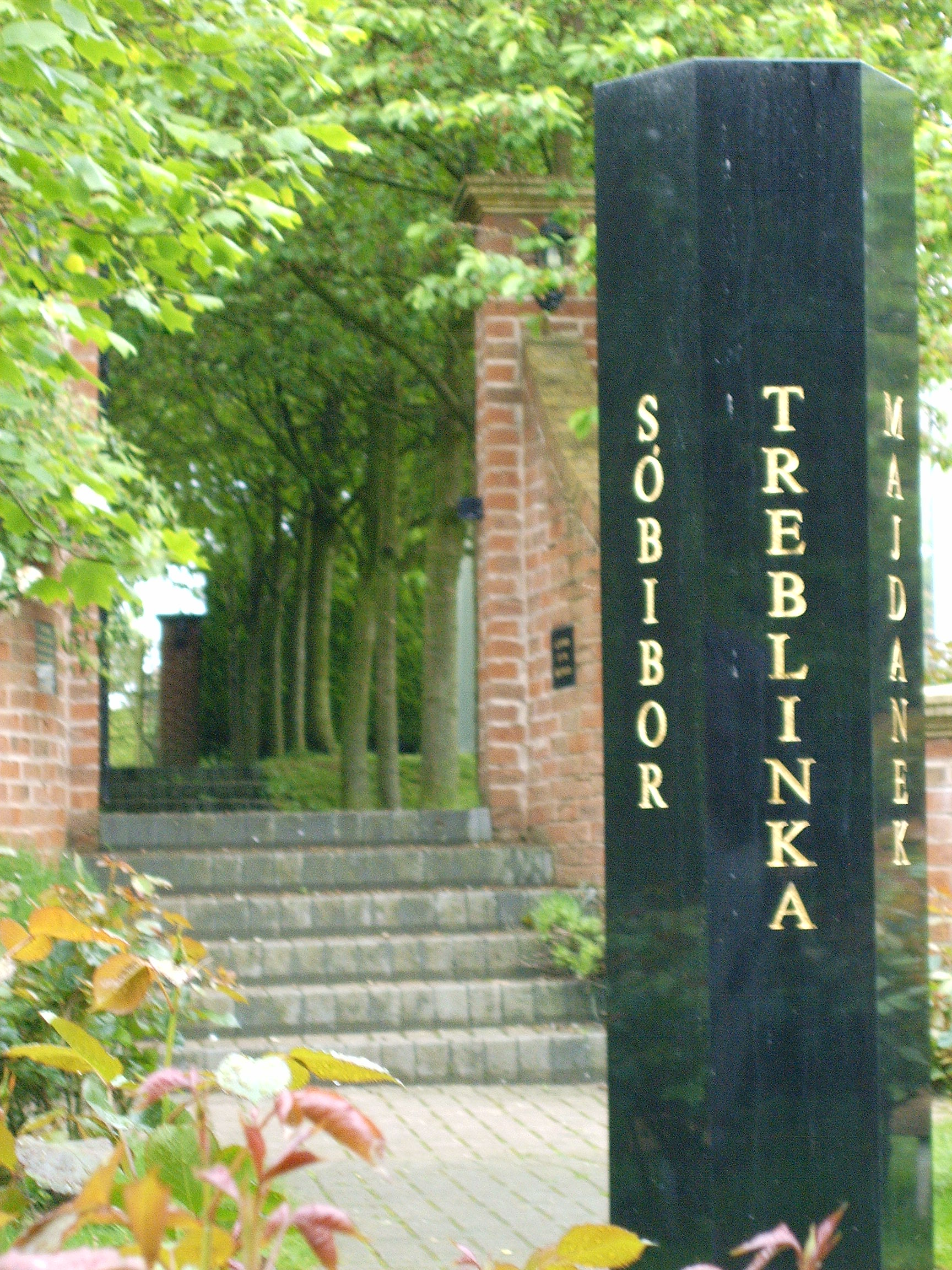
Holocaust Memorial Garden at Beth Shalom

== In the media ==
The village was featured in an episode of Terry Jones' Medieval Lives in 2004, which recorded part of the proceedings of the yearly court leet.

Laxton featured again in the second episode of Michael Wood's Story of England in 2010, which filmed the working of the open field system.

== See also ==
- Listed buildings in Laxton and Moorhouse
