= Laxton and Moorhouse =

Coordinates: 53.187060°N 0.911928°W

- Civil parish
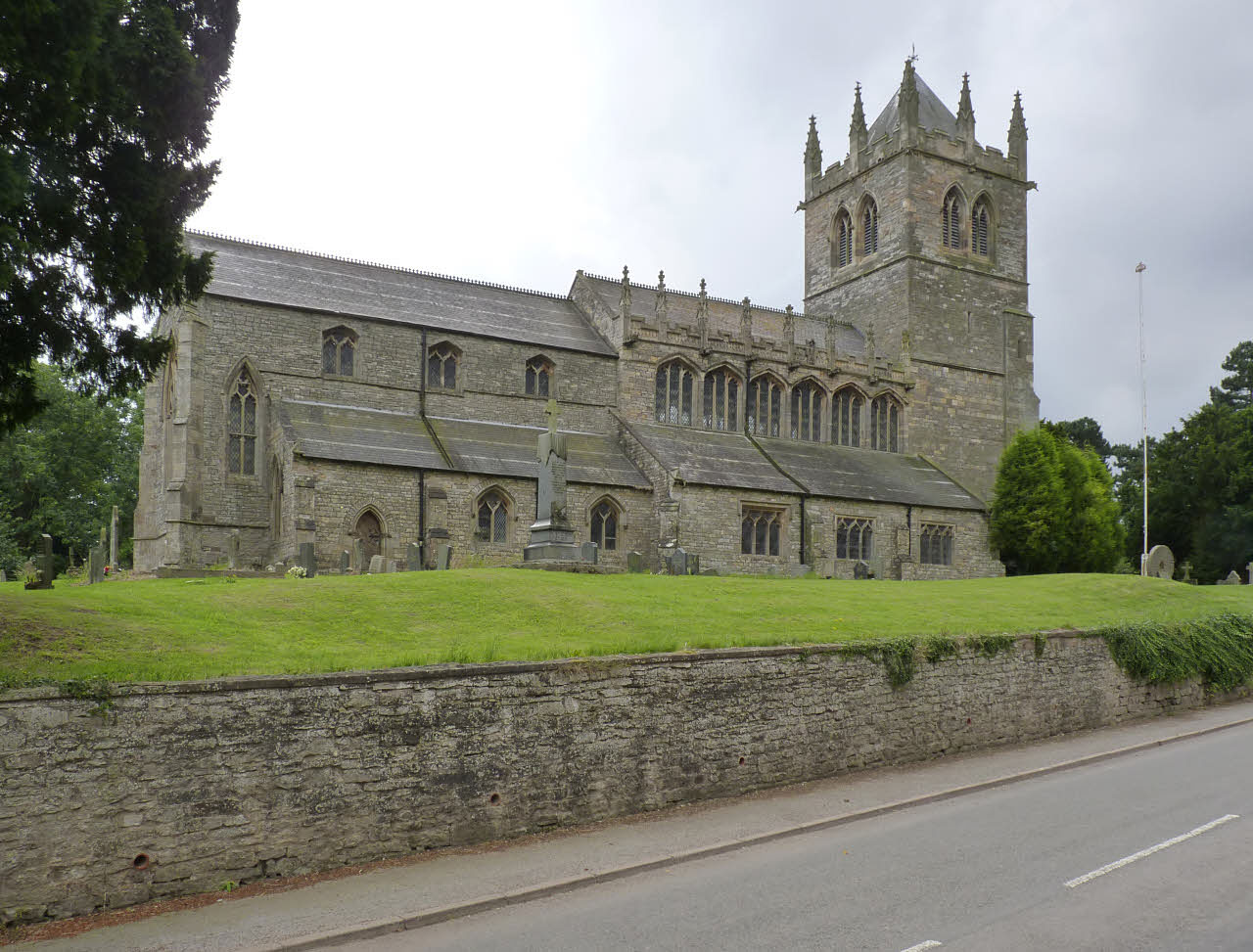
- St Michael the Archangel's Church, Laxton

- Location within Nottinghamshire
- Interactive map of Laxton and Moorhouse
- Area: 6.26 sq mi (16.2 km^{2})
- Population: 251 (2021 Census)
  - Density: 40/sq mi (15/km^{2})
- OS grid reference: SK 73715 66925
  - London: 120 mi (190 km) SE
- District: Newark and Sherwood
- Shire county: Nottinghamshire
- Region: East Midlands
- Country: England
- Sovereign state: United Kingdom
- Places: Laxton and Moorhouse
- Post town: NEWARK
- Postcode district: NG22
- Dialling code: 01636 / 01777 / 01780
- Police: Nottinghamshire
- Fire: Nottinghamshire
- Ambulance: East Midlands
- UK Parliament: Newark
- Website: www.laxtonandmoorhouseparishcouncil.co.uk

Laxton and Moorhouse is a civil parish in the Newark and Sherwood district, within the county of Nottinghamshire, England. In 2021 the parish had a population of 251.

It consists of two settlements:

- A village, Laxton
- A hamlet, Moorhouse.

The parish was previously known as Laxton until 1990 when Moorhouse was included in the title.

== Laxton ==
Laxton is best known for having the last remaining working open-field system in the United Kingdom. Its name is recorded first in the Domesday Book of 1086 as Laxintone, and may come from Anglo-Saxon Leaxingatūn, meaning the 'farmstead or estate of the people of a man called Leaxa'. It is possibly the namesake of the town of Lexington, Massachusetts, and thus ultimately of all the other towns named Lexington in the United States.

== Moorhouse ==
This is 2 miles east of Laxton, Predominantly, it is a scattering of farms, farmhouses and cottages amongst a wider rural setting. These are grouped around three roads meeting by a single junction: Green Lane, Moorhouse Lane, and Ossington Lane.

== See also ==
- Listed buildings in Laxton and Moorhouse
