= Egmanton =

Village and civil parish in Nottinghamshire, England

Coordinates: 53.21151°N 0.89951°W

- Village and civil parish
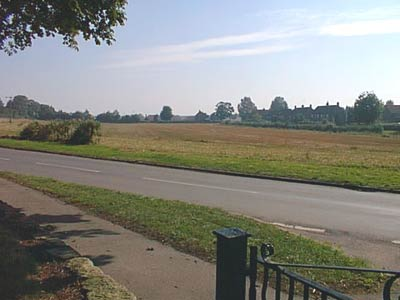
- A view of Egmanton looking east from the church entrance gate

- Location within Nottinghamshire
- Interactive map of Egmanton
- Area: 3.46 sq mi (9.0 km^{2})
- Population: 271 (2021)
  - Density: 78/sq mi (30/km^{2})
- OS grid reference: SK 733687
  - London: 120 mi (190 km) SSE
- District: Newark and Sherwood
- Shire county: Nottinghamshire
- Region: East Midlands
- Country: England
- Sovereign state: United Kingdom
- Post town: NEWARK
- Postcode district: NG22
- Dialling code: 01777
- Police: Nottinghamshire
- Fire: Nottinghamshire
- Ambulance: East Midlands
- UK Parliament: Newark
- Website: www.egmanton-pm.org.uk

Egmanton is a small village and civil parish in Nottinghamshire, England, and is located one mile south of Tuxford and one mile north of Laxton. According to the 2001 census it has 254 inhabitants in 101 households in the civil parish, the population taken at the 2011 census went up to 286, and this fell to 271 for the 2021 census. The name derives from the Old English words for Ecgmund's farm/settlement.

The nearest larger towns are Retford and Newark-on-Trent. It is located approximately 35 metres above sea level.

It is part of the ward of Caunton in the administrative district of Newark and Sherwood District Council and the county of Nottinghamshire. It lies within the Parliamentary constituency of Newark.

Egmanton was mentioned in the Domesday Survey of 1086.

The amenities include an Anglican church, a village hall (formerly the old school) and a pub, 'The Old Plough'. The main economic activity in the village is farming.

== Historical sites ==
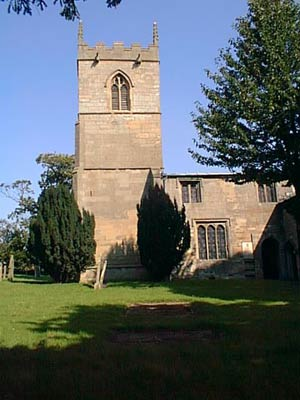
A view of Egmanton Church from the south

=== Egmanton Church – 'Our Lady of Egmanton Church' ===
Egmanton church is best known for the Shrine of Our Lady of Egmanton contained within the church itself. A pilgrimage takes place throughout the year to commemorate the shrine.

=== Egmanton Castle ===
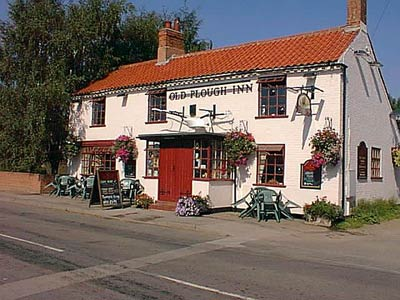
The Old Plough, Egmanton

Egmanton Castle consists of the remains of a Motte and Bailey style castle. It is commonly known as Gaddick Hill.

=== Medieval fish ponds ===
To the west of the village off Kirton road are some earthworks which are the remains of medieval fish ponds, now dry, which were important to people in the Middle Ages.

=== Windmill ===
A tower windmill was located at the southern end of Mill Lane (grid reference SK733683).

== Oil fields ==
Oil has been produced from the East Midlands oil fields since 1939 with some production wells located around Egmanton. Although many have now closed, some of these wells remain in production to this day. On a national scale the level of production was never significant.

== See also ==
- Listed buildings in Egmanton
