= Wellow, Nottinghamshire =

Village and civil parish in Nottinghamshire, England

Coordinates: 53.19°N 1.0°W

Wellow
- Village and civil parish
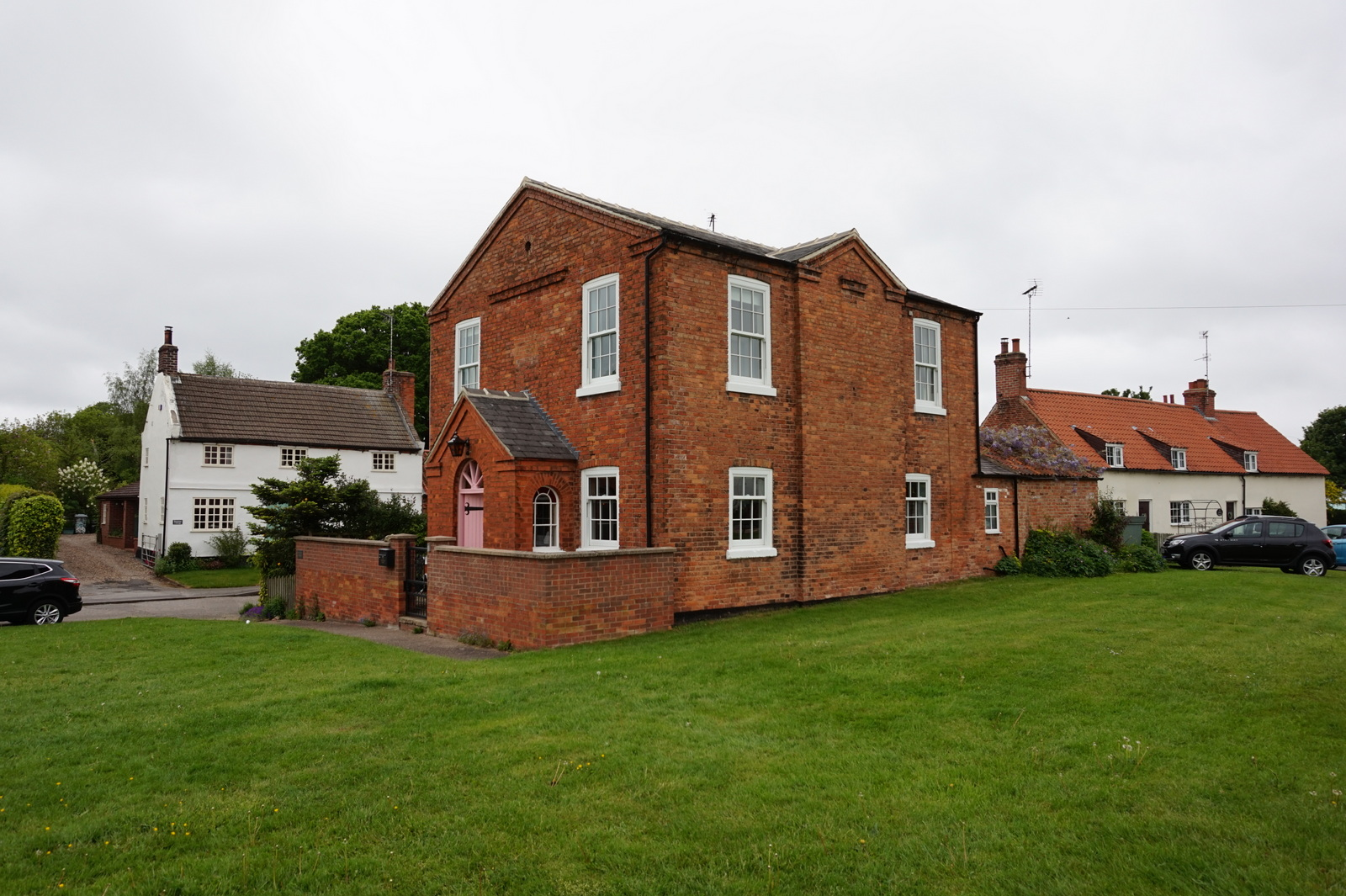
- The Old Chapel

- Location within Nottinghamshire
- Interactive map of Wellow
- Area: 2 sq mi (5.2 km^{2})
- Population: 463 (2021)
  - Density: 232/sq mi (90/km^{2})
- OS grid reference: SK 669662
  - London: 120 mi (190 km) SSE
- District: Newark and Sherwood
- Shire county: Nottinghamshire
- Region: East Midlands
- Country: England
- Sovereign state: United Kingdom
- Post town: NEWARK
- Postcode district: NG22
- Dialling code: 01623
- Police: Nottinghamshire
- Fire: Nottinghamshire
- Ambulance: East Midlands
- UK Parliament: Newark

Wellow is a village in Nottinghamshire, England. According to the 2001 census it had a population of 444, increasing to 470 at the 2011 census, but falling slightly to 463 at the 2021 census.

It has a village green and a maypole, which is still in use. The parish church of St Swithin is 12th century, which was restored, with a new chancel, in 1878–9. On the east and south sides of the village are the remains of a defensive ditch, which originally encircled the village. To the south is the deserted medieval village of Grimston, which now forms part of the Manor of Wellow. To the north east is Jordan Castle, a Norman ringwork consisting of a circular earthwork surrounded by a bank and ditch.

Wellow also has, in Wellow Park, the largest remaining example of ash-wych elm woodland in Nottinghamshire.

== History of The Lordship of the Manor of Wellow ==
The manors of Wellow and Grimston have anciently been held by the lords of Jordon Castle, and the lords of the manor of Wellow

In 1290 Richard Foliot, Knight of Jordon Castle had the rights of Stallage of the market and fair on St. Swithuns day valued at 40s yearly in Wellow.

Jordan Foliot, Baron de Foliot, Lord of Jordon Castle was granted the power to embattle his dwelling at Jordon Castle, he was the Lord of the manor of Grimston, and Wellow, and of Besthorpe, with the Soc of Grimston, and its members, in Kirton Schidrintune, in Willoughby, and Walesby, in Besthorpe, and Carleton, and in Franesfeild.

Cratley and Walesby have been held as Sub Manor of Wellow and Grimston.

There was an assize in the time of King John, between the Abbot of Rufford, and William, son of Robert, and others, concerning Common of Pasture in Wellow and Grimston, The Abbot pleaded that they could not claim nor have any common of pasture in the pasture of the said Abbot, nor he in theirs, because the said lands and pastures were granted from lands of divers Baronies (or lordships) viz. of the Barony of Robert de Cauz, and the Barony of Gilbert de Gant, and that bounds were made between them, that neither Barony could have Common of Pasture in the other, and produced the letters of King John, which testified to these facts.

Wellow is reputed to have the second largest acreage of registered common land north of Watford, over parts of which the Wellow toftholders still have grazing rights.

The village is associated with Robin Hood. An historian has claimed Robin Hood was a pseudonym by which the ancient Lords of Wellow were once known.

== See also ==
- Listed buildings in Wellow, Nottinghamshire
