= Kirton, Nottinghamshire =

Village and civil parish in Nottinghamshire, England

Coordinates: 53.22°N 0.97°W

Kirton
- Village and civil parish
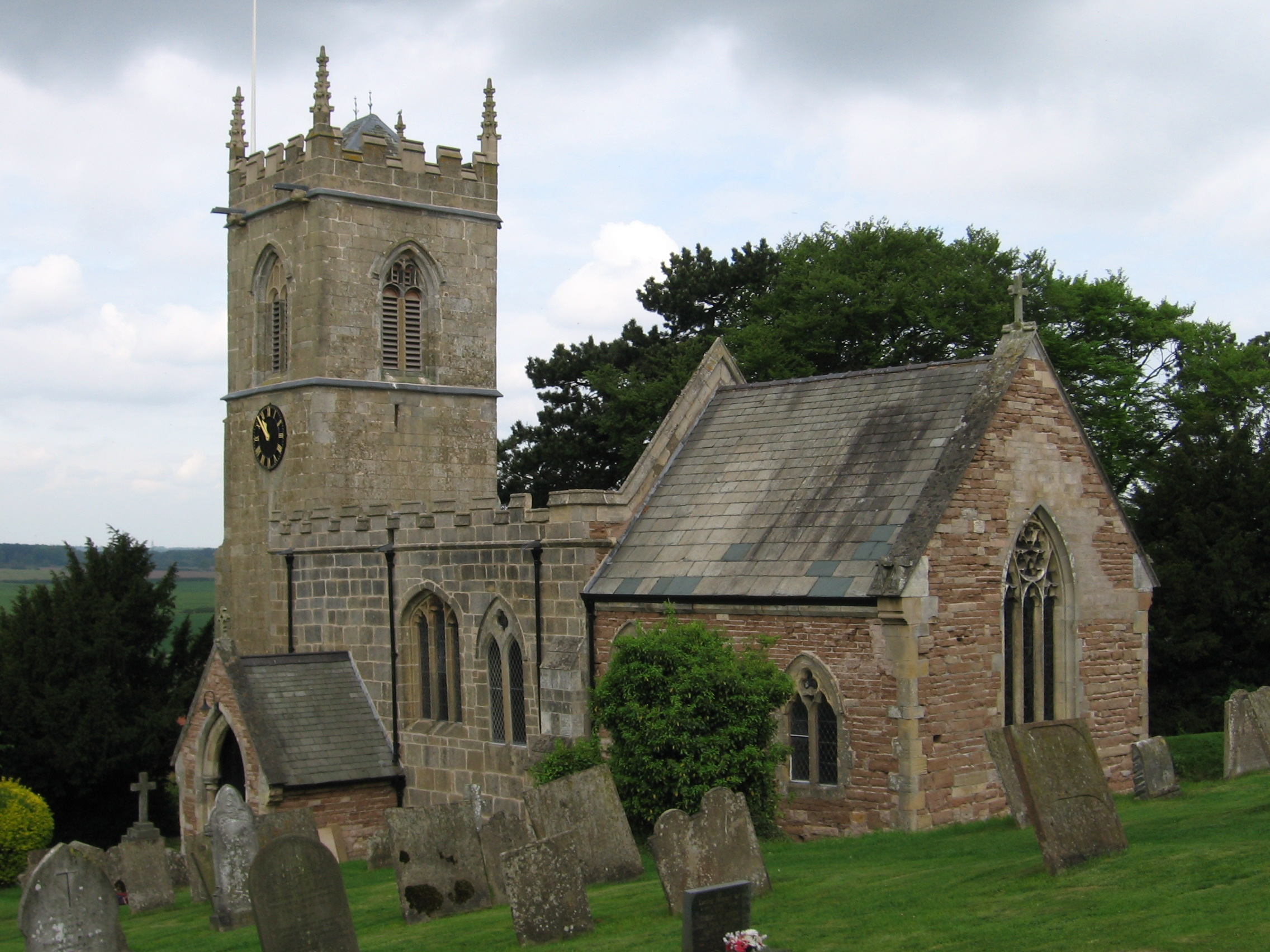
- Kirton Church

- Location within Nottinghamshire
- Interactive map of Kirton
- Area: 1.6 sq mi (4.1 km^{2})
- Population: 267 (2021)
  - Density: 167/sq mi (64/km^{2})
- OS grid reference: SK 690693
  - London: 120 mi (190 km) SSE
- District: Newark and Sherwood
- Shire county: Nottinghamshire
- Region: East Midlands
- Country: England
- Sovereign state: United Kingdom
- Post town: NEWARK
- Postcode district: NG22
- Dialling code: 01623
- Police: Nottinghamshire
- Fire: Nottinghamshire
- Ambulance: East Midlands
- UK Parliament: Sherwood
- Website: Kirton Parish Council

Kirton is a village and civil parish in Nottinghamshire, England. It is located 3 miles (4.8 km) east of Ollerton. According to the United Kingdom Census 2001 it had a population of 273, reducing to 261 at the 2011 census, and rising to 267 at the 2021 census.

The parish church of Holy Trinity is a 13th century church, restored in 1865 in the Victorian era. Hall Farm was built c. 1630 by William Clarkson. It is an early example of brick facing on walls of rough skerry.

== See also ==
- Listed buildings in Kirton, Nottinghamshire
