= Walesby, Nottinghamshire =

Village and civil parish in Nottinghamshire, England

Coordinates: 53.23°N 0.98°W

Walesby
- Village and civil parish
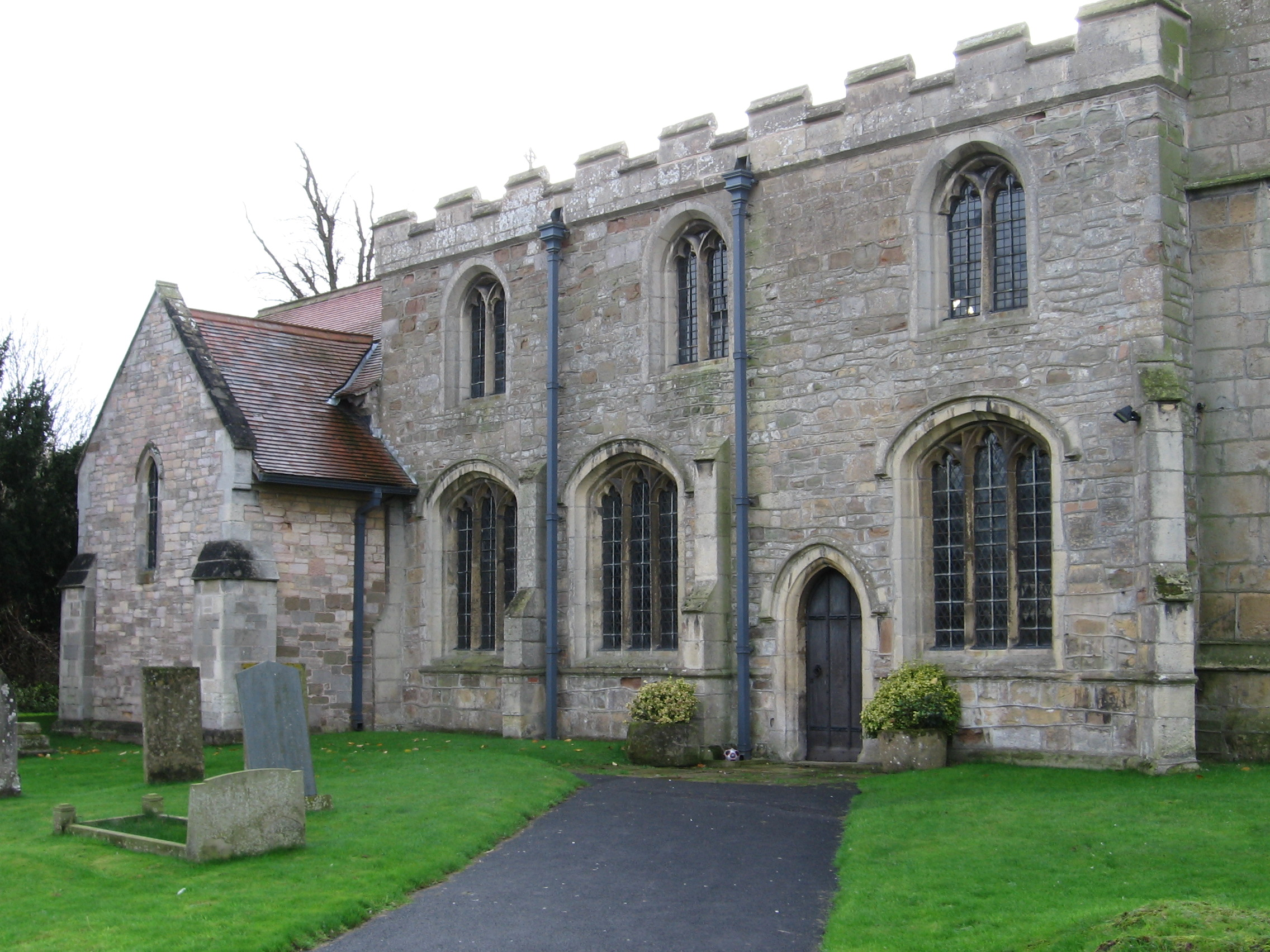
- St Edmunds Church

- Location within Nottinghamshire
- Interactive map of Walesby
- Area: 2.3 sq mi (6.0 km^{2})
- Population: 1,218 (2021)
  - Density: 530/sq mi (200/km^{2})
- OS grid reference: SK 683707
  - London: 125 mi (201 km) SSE
- District: Newark and Sherwood
- Shire county: Nottinghamshire
- Region: East Midlands
- Country: England
- Sovereign state: United Kingdom
- Post town: NEWARK
- Postcode district: NG22
- Dialling code: 01623
- Police: Nottinghamshire
- Fire: Nottinghamshire
- Ambulance: East Midlands
- UK Parliament: Sherwood

Walesby is a village and civil parish in Nottinghamshire, England. At the time of the 2001 census it had a population of 1,255 people, increasing slightly to 1,266 at the 2011 census, and dropping to 1,218 at the 2021 census. It is located 16 miles (26 km) north of Newark. The parish church of St Edmund is Perpendicular in style.

The former noble proprietor being the Duke of Newcastle who was then the Earl of Clare, sold the land and manor house in the mid 1700s, now being Lound Hall and Lound Hall Estate, east of Bothamsall village.

The village is famous for its forest, part of which forms a 250-acre (1.0 km^{2}) Scout camp site. Along with one public house, the Red Lion and the Carpenters Arms, a small Italian kitchen restaurant. There is also a garage and a primary school. The village has a small park with a skate ramp and playground. The Walesby Forest Scout Camp is just outside the village. It hosts international scouting festivals amongst other events. The village and scout camp are also located by a series of streams and the villages of Milton, Kirton, Boughton (pronounced Boot'n) and the town of New Ollerton.

== Notable people ==
- Duncan Pocklington (1841–1870), cricketer, rower and clergyman
