= Lumley (surname) =

Lumley is a surname, and may refer to:

- Aldred Lumley, 10th Earl of Scarbrough (1857–1945), Anglo-Irish peer, soldier and landowner
- Benjamin Lumley (1811–1875), British theatre manager
- Billy Lumley (born 1989), English football goalkeeper
- Bobby Lumley (1933–2017), English footballer
- Brian Lumley (1937–2024), English writer
- Charles Lumley (1824–1858), Scottish soldier, recipient of the Victoria Cross
- Charles Lumley (MP) (c. 1693–1728), British politician
- Dave Lumley (born 1954), Canadian ice hockey player
- Doreen Lumley (1921–1939), New Zealand sprinter
- Ed Lumley (1939–2025), Canadian politician and corporate executive
- George Lumley, 3rd Baron Lumley (1445–1509), English nobleman and soldier
- Harry Lumley (baseball) (1880–1938, American baseball player and manager
- Harry Lumley (ice hockey) (1926–1998), Canadian ice hockey goaltender
- Henry Lumley (disambiguation)
- Ian Lumley (born 1958), Irish conservationist
- James Lumley (c.1706–1766), English Member of Parliament and landowner
- James Rutherford Lumley (1773–1846), English Bengal Army major-general
- Jane Lumley, Baroness Lumley (1537–1578), wife of John Lumley, 1st Baron Lumley
- Joanna Lumley (born 1946), British actress
- Joe Lumley (born 1995), English football goalkeeper
- John Lumley (disambiguation)
- Judith M. Lumley (1941–2018), Australian perinatal epidemiologist
- Karen Lumley (1964–2023), British politician
- Kathryn Wentzel Lumley (c.1918–2008), American educator and children's book author
- Lawrence Lumley, 11th Earl of Scarbrough (1896–1969)
- Marie-Antoinette de Lumley (born 1934), French prehistorian and paleoanthropologist
- Marmaduke Lumley (died 1450), bishop
- Martin Lumley (lord mayor) (died 1634), English merchant and Lord Mayor of London
- Sir Martin Lumley, 1st Baronet (c. 1596–c. 1651), English politician
- Penny Fellows Lumley (born 1963), English real tennis player
- Peter Hope Lumley (1920–2004), English model agent and public relations consultant
- Ralph Lumley, 1st Baron Lumley (c. 1360–1400), English nobleman, soldier and administrator
- Richard Lumley (disambiguation)
- Robin Lumley (1948–2023), British jazz-fusion musician
- Roger Lumley, 11th Earl of Scarbrough (1896–1969), British Army general and politician
- Savile Lumley (1876–1960), English book illustrator and designer
- Scott Lumley, American businessman and convicted fraudster
- Tara Lumley (born 1994), British real tennis and rackets player
- Thomas Lumley (statistician), Australian statistician
- Thomas Lumley, 2nd Baron Lumley (1408–1485), English nobleman and soldier
- Tommy Lumley (1924–2009), English footballer
- William Lumley (1769–1850), British Army officer and courtier

== See also ==
- Governor Lumley (disambiguation)
- Lumley-Savile, a compound surname
- Lumley-Saunderson, a compound surname
- Lambley (surname)
