= Lumley =

Lumley may refer to:

== People ==
- Lumley (surname)
- Lumley Franklin (1808–1873), 2nd mayor of Victoria, British Columbia, Canada

== Other uses ==
- Viscount Lumley, a title in the Peerage of Ireland
- Baron Lumley, four titles in the Peerage of England, one extant
- Lumley Castle, a 14th-century quadrangular castle near Chester-le-Street, County Durham
- Lumley Insurance, a division of Insurance Australia Group

== See also ==
- Great Lumley, a village in County Durham, England
- Little Lumley, a civil parish in County Durham
- Lumley Thicks, a small village in County Durham
