= Martin Lumley =

Martin Lumley may refer to:

- Martin Lumley (lord mayor) (died 1634), English merchant who was Lord Mayor of London, 1623
- Sir Martin Lumley, 1st Baronet (c. 1596–c. 1651), English politician who sat in the House of Commons from 1641 to 1648
- Sir Martin Lumley, 2nd Baronet (c. 1628–1702) of the Lumley baronets
- Sir Martin Lumley, 3rd Baronet (1662–1711) of the Lumley baronets
