= James Lumley (disambiguation) =

James Lumley (c. 1706–1766), was an English Member of Parliament.

James Lumley may also refer to:

- Sir James Rutherford Lumley (1773–1846), English soldier of the Bengal Army in British India
- James Lumley of the Lumley baronets
