= Lambley =

Lambley may refer to:

== Places ==
- Lambley, Northumberland, England
  - Lambley railway station
- Lambley, Nottinghamshire, England

== People with the surname Lambley ==
- Lambley (surname)
- Pedro Castellanos (1902–1961), born Pedro Castellanos Lambley, Mexican priest and architect
- Radulf de Lamley (?–1247), also known as Randalph de Lambley, Scottish 13th-century monk
