= Thomas Lumley =

Thomas Lumley may refer to:

- Thomas Lumley, 2nd Baron Lumley (1408–1485), British nobleman
- Thomas Lumley (statistician) (born 1969), Australian statistician

== See also ==
- Thomas Lumley-Saunderson, 3rd Earl of Scarbrough (c. 1691–1752), British peer
