= St Peter, Westcheap =

Coordinates: 51°30′51.93″N 0°5′41.64″W

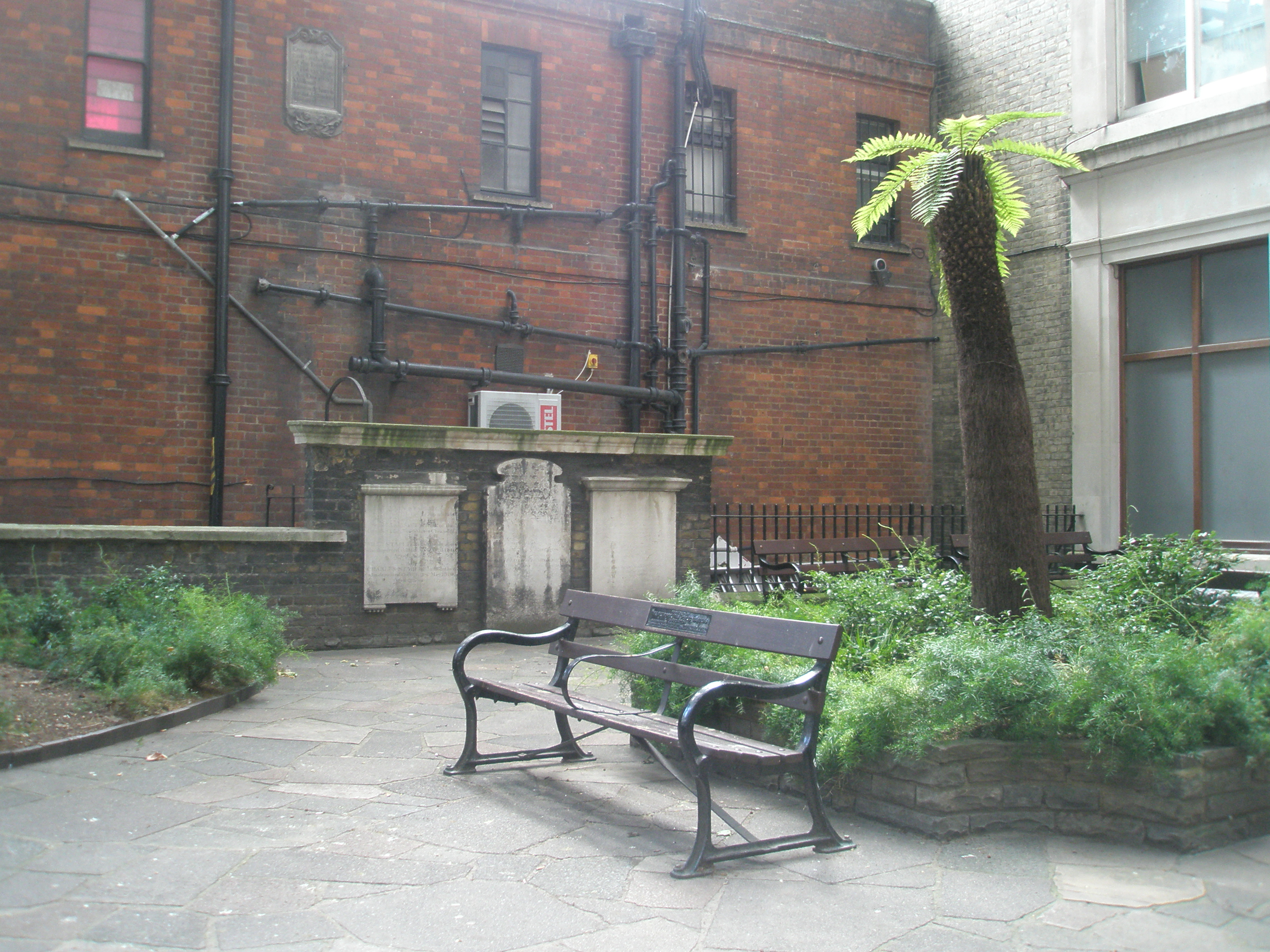
- Current photo of site
- St Peter, Westcheap
- OS grid reference: TQ 32289 81219
- Location: Wood Street, London
- Country: England
- Denomination: Anglican

Architecture
- Demolished: 1666

Administration
- Diocese: London

St Peter, Westcheap, also called "St Peter Cheap", "St Peter at the Cross in Cheap", or "Ecclesia S. Petri de Wodestreet", was a parish and parish church of medieval origins in the City of London. The church stood at the south-west corner of Wood Street where it opens onto Cheapside, directly facing the old Cheapside Cross. In its heyday it was a familiar landmark where the City waits used to stand on the roof and play as the great processions went past. It was destroyed in the Great Fire of London in 1666, together with most of its surroundings, and was never rebuilt.

In its place three shops were built on the Cheapside frontage in 1687, and the land behind continued to be used as a burial-ground and garden, which was enclosed with railings in 1712. The ancient Cheapside plane tree grows there, and with the group of houses and garden survived the Second Great Fire of London in December 1940. The garden is still maintained for public use. Here William Wordsworth was moved to write of "Poor Susan" who, hearing the song of a thrush in the busy London thoroughfare, was transported by the vision of a stream flowing through the fields and her solitary cottage in the countryside.

The small parish of St Peter Westcheap lay on the north of Cheapside, between the lower ends of Gutter Lane in the west and Wood Street in the east, and enclosed the whole of Goldsmith Street. It was mainly in the Ward of Farringdon Within, but also touched on Bread Street Ward and Cripplegate Ward. After the Fire it was united with St Matthew Friday Street (to the south of Cheapside). That church was demolished in 1885 and the parishes were united with St Vedast Foster Lane.

== The historic location ==
The seventh-century foundation of St Paul's stood within the Roman walls of the former Londinium. The routes leading from the Barbican or Cripplegate in the north down towards Queenhithe on the river, and from Aldgate in the east passing north of St Paul's towards Ludgate and later Newgate in the west, crossed at the junction of Wood Street with the western part of Cheapside (Westcheap). This is the backdrop for the location's importance within the developing medieval street-grid. The tradition that King Offa of Mercia (r. 757-796) (whose control of London was central to his power in the age of Charlemagne) had his palace adjacent to St Alban's church in Wood Street as its chapel may be legendary, but it draws upon Offa's role as the founder of St Albans Abbey. The pre-Norman Conquest origins of St Albans Wood Street and of St Mary-le-Bow, and probably of St Michael Wood Street, indicated by evidence of their physical remains, preceded the development of neighbourhood churches or private chapels nearby. The name "Chepe" refers to a market area on the north side of the present thoroughfare, serving many different trades, which was gradually replaced by formal structures.

In the Middle Ages Cheapside formed part of the processional concourse through the city towards Westminster, and regularly witnessed all the pageantry of Coronation processions, royal and diplomatic entries and, from the time of Edward I until the 16th century, of the tourneys and civic spectacles including the annual "Midsummer Watch". At the Wood Street crossing, between St Mary-le-Bow church and the north side of St Paul's Churchyard, and directly in front of St Peter's, the Cheapside Cross was set up by King Edward I in 1291–94 as one of the "Eleanor crosses" marking the resting-places of the body of Queen Eleanor on the way to Westminster Abbey. This became a central place of public proclamation, and, being densely populated by merchants and their apprentices of all kinds, was also the scene of many public punishments and executions, and the focus of frequent popular disturbances. In late medieval times this locality was particularly famous for its community of wealthy gold- and silversmiths. Closely within the sphere of St Paul's, and of Paul's Cross, and belonging to the Diocese of London, St Peter Westcheap stood in the heart of London's civic and ecclesiastical life.

== The medieval church ==
The church and parish of St Peter Westcheap were in existence in the 12th century. A deed of Ralph de Diceto, Dean of St Paul's c. 1180–1200, grants land in "Godrune Lane" (i.e. Gutter Lane) in the parish of St Peter (then already existing). The patronage of the church belonged to the Abbots of St Albans until the Dissolution of the monasteries.

In early times it may have stood fully within the ward of Cheap. Walter Hervey, alderman of Cheap, who at the end of the reign of King Henry III was elected Mayor by folkmoot, sought to reorganize the Guilds and Crafts of London and issued several charters. When these were repudiated by his successor Henry le Walleis in 1273 and by Gregory de Rokesley, Hervey, coming from the Guildhall, assembled a great crowd of supporters at St Peter's church in Chepe, and promised to maintain their charters if he could. Although the repressive clearance of the Chepe followed, this was a critical moment in the development of the Guilds. In June 1302, soon after the building of the Cheapside Cross, King Edward I presented William de Stanham to the church of St Peter in Wodestrete, it being in his hands by the voidance of St Albans Abbey. Two years later the clerk of the church, John Blome, was arrested by the Sheriffs for his part in an armed affray in the Chepe between tailors and cordwainers at All Hallows' Eve.

A long connection arose with the Mystery of the Goldsmiths, whose Hall stood in Foster Lane (closely associated with St Vedast's and St John Zachary parishes), and whose constituted patron was St Dunstan. The Craft was strongly concentrated within the parish. Edward III, granting his first charter to the Goldsmiths in 1327, stipulated that all licensed goldsmiths in the City should have their shops in the high street of Cheap, so that the assay of precious metals could be controlled and conducted near to the King's Exchange (the "Old Change"). Thomas de Winton is mentioned as rector of St Peter's in 1324 by Richard Newcourt, in the midst of the revolutionary crisis in which John the Marshal and Walter de Stapledon, Bishop of Exeter, were seized and beheaded at the "Standard" cross (at the east end of St Michael, Cornhill) in 1326. In 1334 Stephen de Wallingford was installed as rector by the abbot of St Albans. Ten years later he appears as Rector and perpetual chaplain to the Hospital of St Julian by St Albans; at a chapter held in February 1344 in the hall of his residence he ratified the reformed regulations of the house, using the seal of the lord official of London.

In 1348 Simon de Berkyng, citizen goldsmith, left his house in Wood Street to his children, but in default of heirs "to the alms of the Goldsmithry of London for his soul, finding a chaplain to celebrate service in the church of St Peter, Wood Street, by view of the Wardens of the Goldsmithry, for the good of his own soul and those of his father and mother." King Edward presented William de Kelm to the rectory in 1349. In 1359 John de Barton, a goldsmith who had forfeited his livery and membership for some serious transgression, made his appeal for re-admittance to the livery at St Peter's church.

The Faringdon chantry

The Goldsmiths' Fraternity laid out £20 for the "work" of the church of St Peter Chepe in 1354. The Faringdon Chantry at St Peter's was established in 1361 in the will of Nicholas de Farndon (Warden of the Goldsmiths in 1338 and 1352) for the souls of his mother Roysia and of his grandfather Nicholas de Farndone (alias le Fevre), four times Lord Mayor of London, who had died in 1334. These relationships are partly explained in an assize in 1367 over Faringdon property in the parish. The Wards of Farringdon Within and Without took their name from this family through their long proprietary jurisdiction, and from the important role of the elder Nicholas during the turmoil of the 1320s, so that the chantry in St Peter's acquired a foundational civic meaning.

The younger Nicholas requested burial at St Peter Cheap, and gave tenements in St Lawrence in the East, and rents in All-Hallows-the-Less for the maintenance of the chantry, and the surplus toward the "work" of the church, and there is a corresponding record of their receipt by rector William de Kelm in 1364. A fragment of the Norman French tomb inscription to the younger Nicholas de Farndon (1361) survived at St Peter's into the 17th century ("... pur l'ame Nicole de Farindon...") and was seen by John Stow and recorded by John Weever (1631), both of whom mistakenly interpreted it as being for the elder Nicholas. However, as Richard Newcourt observed, Nicholas de Farndone the elder was buried in Old St Paul's Cathedral, where a separate chantry was inaugurated for him and for William Viel in this same year of 1361 (or thereabouts), at the altar of St Dunstan in the New Work.

In 1379 seven named chaplains are found attached to the church. The parish in the time of rector John Ledbury (who had been a vicar of St Martin's Le Grand in 1379), comes to life vividly in a study of Matilda Penne, widow of William Penne, Skinners, who had their home and shop in Wood Street. For twelve years after William's death Matilda continued the business successfully: her will of 1392, of which Ledbury was an executor, reveals her close relationship with the church, with John Ledbury and his chaplains, to whom she left individual gifts. A devout person, she arranged her funeral and burial there before the central cross where she had usually stood. Her furnishings, possessions and gowns were, if not sumptuous, valuable, and her legacies generous: she leaves personal bequests to friends in religious orders, and usual charitable causes. Her Wood Street neighbours of various trades, William and Isabella Irby, Haberdashers (who were also buried at St Peter's), and Joanna, widow of alderman Thomas Carleton, citizen and Broderer, received precious items for remembrance.

== 15th century ==
In 1392 King Richard II confirmed the Goldsmiths' Charter, by which the Company was more fully incorporated. In 1396 he presented John Hovyngham as rector of St Peter's, newly a Bachelor of Canon Law from the University of Oxford. In 1401 licence was granted to build the "Long Shop", a hut-like commercial premises which encroached onto Cheapside along the south frontage of the church: this still existed in 1603.

An important gift of land, shops and tenements in St Lawrence Pountney was made to Hovyngham and the church by two Goldsmiths, John Forster and Thomas Polle, to find a chaplain to celebrate divine service daily in the church, for the welfare of the king and his soul, for the souls of the grantors and of Nicholas de Farendon. The parish accounts record this as from the London Court of Husting in the reign of Richard II, specifying that the chaplain shall not be "ouircome of custumable dronkelyness", but it was licensed among the letters patent of Henry IV in April 1402. In 1406 King Henry pardoned and approved a papal bull granting Hovyngham a canonry and prebend in each of the Cathedral churches of St Peter's, York and St Paul's, London, and a greater dignity in one or the other, provided that this did not extend to elective benefices. Hovyngham was by this date a Doctor of Civil Law. From 1405 he served on commissions (on occasion with Richard Whittington) to deliberate in important cases of appeal against judgements, particularly concerning maritime or Admiralty affairs, including the unjust capture of ships of Brittany.

Hovyngham was collated to the Archdeaconry of Durham in 1408, when Richard Kelsterne succeeded him as rector. Both appointments followed upon that of Thomas Langley as Bishop of Durham (1406), as Kelsterne, one of the king's clerks, was Henry IV's nomination to Langley for a benefice owing in respect of his elevation. Having brokered a shipping truce with Castile, Hovyngham negotiated with Duke of Burgundy for King Henry V, and conducted secret communications in France before the expedition of 1415. At his death in 1417, Hovyngham remembered his former cure of St Peter's in his lengthy will. He leaves 100 shillings for the making of a vestment for service at the high altar, and 40 shillings for distribution among the poor of this parish. Should he die in London, he leaves 20 pence for the chaplains of St Peter's and St Lawrence Jewry who will perform a funeral mass. He gives 20 shillings to dominus Walter, an ancient chaplain serving in St Peter's, for his past services; and he has a little book of Vegetius belonging to dominus Richard (Kelsterne), the rector of St Peter's, which he wishes will be returned to its owner. Dominus Thomas Leven, chaplain in the parish church of St Peter, is the first of several witnesses.

An important tomb at St Peter's was that of John Boteler, who was Sheriff of London in 1420. This was the Mercer of that name, M.P. for London in 1417 and alderman for Faringdon Within in 1420–22, Cripplegate 1423, who had possession of The Newe Tavern in St Peter's, was Master of the Mercers in 1421, and Auditor to the Court of Aldermen. He died in 1423. John Stow places the grave of William Russ, Goldsmith, Sheriff in 1429–30 here (c. 1435), but he was benefactor of St Michael Cornhill and requested burial there. As Sheriff, Russ presided at an assize of frisca forcia at Westminster in 1425–1430 in which William Molash, Prior of Christ Church, Canterbury, recovered from Henry Hamond, Rector of St Peter's, and his churchwardens an annual receipt of 6s.8d for "The Swan" in St Lawrence Pountney, and accepted 10s. to waive £21.06s.08d awarded in costs and arrears against them. The prosperity of the Goldsmiths' Company in that period is reflected in the rich equipment of the church shown in an Inventory of 1431.

Inventory of 1431

There were then four altars: the high altar in the chancel; an altar to Our Lady in a chapel on the north side, near to the Vestibule; another to St Dunstan at the south-east corner; and the fourth, the "Rood" altar (of the Holy Cross), in the nave, near the entrance to St Dunstan's chapel. An heraldic cloth spanned the rood beam, surmounted by the rood itself. Each altar had its own array of textiles, richly coloured and embroidered frontals with appliqué gold motifs and suites of "steyned cloths" with images of the saints for use at special feast days. In 1434 the three subsidiary altars were dedicated. The altar of the Holy Cross had for its relic a fragment of the True Cross, encased in a gold cross garnished with precious stones. Emblems were displayed for St Anne, St Barbara, St Catherine, St Helen and St Osyth.

The many vestments included several copes of cloth of gold for the priest, deacon and subdeacon for various occasions. There was a series of pennons and standards, some heraldic (arms of the King, the Duke of Lancaster, the Earl of Salisbury, St Edward) and others with figures or emblems of the saints. The lectern had a red cloth of gold, and another cloth with a suite of cushions embroidered with the cross keys of St Peter. There were copious silver-gilt vessels for the Eucharist, many latten candlesticks, silver chrismatory, coffer, censers and crosses. Among the books were a principal Missal (and four others), Evangeliary, Antiphonary, Legendary, Processional, Collectarium, a Troper, Martyrology and Psalter, a chained Dirge-book, and a book of pricksong. There were painted triptychs depicting the Holy Trinity, and the Annunciation of Our Lady.

Accounts show that the church organ was repaired in 1433. Henry Hamond having died, Richard Barnet, clerk, succeeded to the benefice in April 1433, but within eight months made way by resignation for Robert Wyght, priest, in November. Wyght is Rector in the Lay Subsidy of 1436; he may have held the benefice for some time, for in 1447 Robert Wyght, clerk, and Richard Barnet (Town Clerk of London 1438–1446) together, acting as trustees, held the remainder of lands (formerly of Thomas Monk and John Askwyth) in St Andrew Holborn, St Giles-without-Cripplegate and Westminster, which they then (4 April, 24 Henry VI) demised to William Horn, citizen and Draper, heir of John Askwyth's widow Alice Horn (deceased). So late as 1465 Wyght's executors, William Barton the chaplain of the Faryngdon chantry, and John Roger, chaplain of the Holy Cross chantry at St Peter's, were seeking recovery of a debt of 10 marks from five husbandmen of Hammersmith and "Woxbridge" (?Uxbridge), Middlesex in the Common Pleas, perhaps rents owing for their endowment.

In the interim John London (who in 1443–44 had retained a chaplain for St Vedast Foster Lane) had succeeded Wyght, and had resigned in 1461. The church tower at this time contained four bells, which were hallowed or dedicated in 1450, when the smallest bell had been "new made": the great bell in the name of the Holy Trinity; the second, of Our Lady; the third, of St Peter; and the fourth of St Michael. A diminishing scale of fees was charged for the ringing of knells and minds, depending on the size of the bell rung, and the moneys raised went half to the churchwardens and half to the church clerk.

== Benefactions, works and burials ==
John Alcock became rector in 1462, and held the benefice for 30 years until his death. This was not the Bishop and Lord Chancellor of the same name, his contemporary, but a parson entirely associated with this parish who held through the time of Edward IV and Richard III, and witnessed the onset of its Tudor prosperity. Following the full incorporation of the Goldsmiths' Company in 1462 by Edward IV, a reforming spirit among powerful figures in the Company arose during the 1480s which is reflected in enlarged benefactions to St Peter's. The Goldsmith Robert Botiler, by his will of 1470, requested burial at St Peter's beside his wife Julyan, and left 20 shillings for the parson to pray for his soul; his obit was held on 2 August. Thomas Atkyns, who died on 15 August 1486, and was buried at St Peter's beside his wife Johanna, was possibly the London Goldsmith of that name, and, being designated Armiger, was very likely the king's serjeant-at-arms who received a lifetime pension from King Henry VII in that year.

Sir Edmund Shaa and Sir John Shaa, benefactors

Sir Edmund Shaa, who had been apprenticed to Robert Boteler, by his will of 1488 left a valuable bequest to the church. Shaa, alderman for Cripplegate 1473–1485, was Sheriff in 1474–75, Prime Warden of the Goldsmiths in 1476, and Auditor to the aldermen in 1479–81. As Lord Mayor of London and Engraver at the Mint in 1482–83, he supported Richard III at his accession and held a great London muster in his favour, was knighted and became a Privy Councillor. He became alderman for Cheap Ward from 1485 until his death in 1488, and was buried in the Mercers' chapel. Sir Edmund, in consultation with Thomas Wood, gave £200 to the churchwardens and vestry of St Peter's to purchase an "amortified livelode" to ensure the continuance of daily service in the church, and for a daily sung Mass of Our Lady. By the same gift he established a perennial annual Obit on a certain day for his own soul and for the souls of Robert Boteler and Thomas Wood, to be performed by the parson, curate and other priests of the parish, to be observed on the eve by a Placebo and Dirige, and on the morrow by Mass of Requiem, with provision of bread, ale, cheese, spices and wine, and for the distribution of coals to the poor of this and neighbouring parishes.

At this same time, 1484–1486, the Cheapside Cross was re-constructed and "curiously wrought" with carved figures of Our Lady and Child, the Resurrection of Jesus, King Edward the Confessor, and others, under a licence granted to the Mayor in 1441, from public benefactions. In 1490 "Sir" John Laton is parish priest. Parson John Alcock died early in 1491/2 leaving instructions that he was to be buried before the high altar in the middle chancel of St Peter's "in the place which I have made and ordeyned convenient for the same". His will is largely concerned with arrangements for his funerals, by which many small legacies came to his serving priests. All the priests of St Peter Chepe and St Matthew Friday Street were to be involved, and others brought in, and poor men to carry the torches, for an obit of placebo and dirige, and a morrow mass, for a month, and the torches to be kept to burn at three altars at Elevation time; the Obit was also to be kept annually for ten years. His personal legacies refer to the family of Richard Burton, Goldsmith, one of his executors.

In his place came Maister John Chaunterell, of a prominent Northampton family and probably educated at Cambridge, whose 18-year term as parson completed the reign of King Henry VII. His mother Dame Luce, to whom he was executor, was buried at St Giles, Northampton in 1495, where his merchant brother William Chaunterell (died 1521) was a notable benefactor. Among his various books John Chaunterell possessed an exquisite vellum manuscript Mass-book of Lincoln diocese production, which he left to St Giles in his will and which later remained in his family. This still survives in its original binding, a sumptuous memorial to the early Tudor heyday of St Peter's. Among his first duties was the funeral of Richard Hadley, citizen and Grocer and his wife Margeria, parishioners whose monument of 1492 is recorded by Stow. Hadley was a wealthy citizen with estates in Norfolk, Kent, and at Waltham Holy Cross in Essex, whose will was proved in 1493.

Sir John Shaa, nephew of Sir Edmund, was also Engraver at the Mint in 1483 (and joint Master of the Mint in 1493 and 1495–98), and Prime Warden of the Goldsmiths in 1491–92. Sheriff in 1496–97, alderman for Bread Street 1496 until his death in 1504, M.P. for London in 1495 and 1503, and Lord Mayor in 1501-02, he was also executor to his uncle's will, and in his own will made at Christmas 1503 he bequeathed his lands and tenements in St Peter's parish, and in St Dunstan-in-the-East, for the fulfilment of Sir Edmund's intention to maintain the singing and performance of daily service in St Peter's (if possible), "else with the same londis and goodys I wyll that my sayd executors shall cause the sayd churche of Saint Petur to be buylded and made with a flatte roofe. And also the Stepull ther to be made up in gode and convenient manner." The will shows that Shaa also owned the tenement in St Peter's parish in which John Chaunterell lived.

Thomas Wood, benefactor

Thomas Wood, Prime Warden of the Goldsmiths in 1484, 1490 and 1497, and Sheriff in 1491–92, had agreed with Sir Edmond Shaa to underwrite the endowment of his Obit. He became alderman of Vintry Ward from 1496 until his death in 1503 or 1504. John Stow told how he built "the most beautiful frame of fair houses and shops that be within the walls of London... betwixt Bread Street end and the Cross in Cheap." These stood directly opposite St Peter's, on the south frontage of Cheapside.

"It containeth in number ten fair dwellings and fourteen shops, all in one frame, uniformly built four storeys high, beautified towards the street with the Goldsmiths' arms and the likeness of Woodmen, in memory of his name, riding on monstrous beasts, all which is cast in lead, painted over and gilt: these he gave to the Goldsmiths, with stocks of money, to be lent to young men having those shops."

Stow attributes to him the images of Woodmen, or Woodwoses, which supported the roof of the middle aisle of St Peter's church. Expenses of 1590 for repairing the shields, arrows and clubs of the "greene men" may refer to these figures, their attributes and heraldic devices. Thomas Wood's will, dated 1501/02, appointed his burial in the tomb on the right of the high altar at St Peter's, with arrangements for the burial, mourning, and month's mind. It contained many bequests in favour of St Peter's, including "myn ymage of Jhū of sylver and gilte to stande on the high awter", and made parson John Chaunterell Overseer to his executors.

Chaunterell also supervised the 1507 will of William Wood, Shearman (a fustian worker), a parishioner of St Peter who may have been kinsman of Thomas. John Chaunterell died in late 1509 requesting burial (and a "towombe") in front of the cross in St Paul's churchyard, "if it soo may be licenced". Like his predecessor he makes funeral appointments involving all the priests of his parish, and "the gret bell of my church shall be rongen for me" and the wardens to have 6s.8d. for the fee. He leaves money for a pyx "for that in time of visitation the Sacrament may always abide in the church honourably in a Pix." He has two copies of John de Burgo's work Pupilla Oculi, a compilation of priestly services including the Seven Sacraments and the Precepts of the Decalogue which, being first printed in 1510, must have been in manuscript. The greater he leaves to his brother Nicholas and the lesser to his friend John Buttler, priest of St Peter's: his nephew John will have three volumes, the Letters of St Augustine, the Letters of St Jerome, and his Pico di Mirandola. His Legenda Aurea goes to the priest of the Skinners in the Guildhall chapel. "Sir" William Grene, priest in his church, has £6.13s.04d to celebrate mass for him for a year, and is a witness, together with the three Goldsmiths John Pycke, William Brocket and Edward Jordeyn, and his executors are his brother William and Henry Worley, Goldsmith.

William Robinson, Doctor of Canon Law in the University of Cambridge, constituted Vicar general of the Ely diocese in 1495/96, succeeded Chaunterell as rector until his death in 1516. In his time Dame Margaret Wood died, in 1514, and was buried beside her first husband beside the high altar, (William Copynger having been buried with his first wife at St Mildred Bread Street in the previous year). Thomas Wood's son-in-law Henry Worley was Prime Warden of the Goldsmiths in 1512, and from 1511–1524 was alderman for Broad Street Ward, and Sheriff in 1515–16. He and John Palmer, Fishmonger, appear together so early as 1484 at St James's Fair in Bristol. Palmer is granted black cloth for mourning in Thomas Wood's will, and the tomb inscription at St. Peter's for John Palmer and his wife Agnes recorded his death in April 1513. Henry Worley also had a tomb inscription in the church, with his wife Julyan: he died in August 1524, but she remarried.

Dr Robinson was rich in plate and textiles, and his will favours his parish at Barley in Hertfordshire, and Royston Priory; it refers to his chamber in Cambridge, and his books of Divinity, Astronomy and Humanity, of Canon and Civil Law.

== Pre-Reformation rectors ==
Dr Robinson's successor as rector was William Boleyn, the fourth son of Sir William Boleyn, a graduate (B.A. 1503/04, M.A. 1507), pensioner of Gonville Hall and University Preacher of Cambridge. His first year at St Peter's (1517) was marked by the Evil May Day riots in Cheapside: a leading parishioner, Goldsmith John Mundy, narrowly escaped from the rioters. Mundy became Lord Mayor in 1522, and his second wife, Dame Julian, was the daughter of Sir William Browne and granddaughter of Sir Edmund Shaa.

An inventory of 1518 opens an informative series of church accounts from Boleyn's time. The vestry on the north side, which had been built in 1475, had three chambers which were assigned to the parish priest, the "morrow mass priest" (who performed daily mass early each morning), and the Faringdon chantry priest. In 1518 "Sir" Thomas Carter and Mr Ball were singing for the chantry, paid quarterly: in 1519 the rooms were occupied by Willyam Abye, Thomas Bostocke and Rauffe Yonge. "Sir" William Abye, the chantry priest, served for many years and died during the 1540s at the advanced age of 108. During the 1520s work was carried out on the organ, and the little organs were renewed. (These were presumably the double regals which were repaired by Father Howe in 1555.) A chest for the church plate was purchased from the Goldsmiths: repairs were made to two damaged crucifixes, and new cruets were provided.

Customs

The accounts of the 1520s reveal various long-established customs. Special importance was paid to the feast of St Nicholas, when a "Boy Bishop" was elected, with his three deacons. In 1431 his vestments are listed including two copes, a mitre, a tunicle (or dalmatic), a chasuble, three albs for the children, and a crozier for the bishop, valued then at 40 shillings: their vestments are listed again in 1518. At important holy festivals the church was decked with flowers and garlands, and the floor strewn with herbs. Holly and ivy were brought in at Christmas. Throughout the year special occasions, including Twelfth Day, May Day, Midsummer's Day, and Faringdon's Mind (St George's Day), were celebrated here with breakfasts or dinners, or with "drynkyngs" (a form of minor feast often observed at funerals), a custom continued through the 16th century. In 1522 there was a "drynkyng" when Henry Worley went with a party to view a church property at the Old Wharf.

The Lenten and Easter ceremonies were observed as a liturgical pageant. In Lent "steyned" cloths with red crosses were brought out for the altars, rood and desk, and to cover the figures of St Peter and St Paul. Frames were installed to deck the church for Palm Sunday, with "stages" for the prophets, specially attired, and cakes and ale were provided. The Easter Sepulchre was draped (with a hearse to support four angels), at which parishioners maintained a Vigil on Good Friday and Easter Eve, and payments were made for the reading of the Passion and for supply of bread and wine to be brought out from the Sepulchre on Easter Day.

Prominent churchmen

William Boleyn remained at St Peter's until 1529, when he was appointed Archdeacon of Winchester, as King Henry's attentions were becoming fixed upon his niece Anne Boleyn. His successor, the most eminent rector of St Peter's, Thomas Goodrich, was presented by Cardinal Wolsey (as representative of St Albans Abbey) in 1529. Goodrich, who had studied at Corpus Christi College, Cambridge and became a Fellow of Jesus College, was immediately involved in state affairs, being consulted over the legality of the King's marriage to Catherine of Aragon, and appointed among the syndics of his University to decide that question. Becoming one of the King's chaplains, and a canon of St Stephen's, Westminster, he was involved in the reform of the ecclesiastical laws and the affirmation of the King's supremacy in the church, and participated in an embassy to France. These affairs led to his elevation to the Bishopric of Ely in 1534, whereupon he surrendered the benefice of St Peter's and he embarked more fully upon his career as a statesman favouring the English Reformation.

Dr Richard Gwent (Rector 1534–1543), presented as his successor by St Albans, also had a significant role in turbulent affairs of Henry's reign. Of Monmouthshire origins, he was Doctor of both laws from All Souls' College, Oxford, and moved to London as an advocate. A royal chaplain, in September 1532 Cromwell appointed him Dean of the Arches and Master of the Prerogative just in advance of Thomas Cranmer's elevation to the see of Canterbury. He left St Leonard, Foster Lane for the benefice of St Peter when he was appointed Archdeacon of London and of Brecon. He served as prolocutor to the lower house in the Convocations of 1536, 1540 and 1542, on the second occasion participating in the judgement of annulment in the marriage of Henry VIII to Anne of Cleves. As Cranmer's Commissary and chief legal draftsman he was closely involved in the reform of canon law and enforcement of the royal Supremacy, and was active in detecting heresy and receiving surrenders of monasteries. At his death in 1543 he held three archdeaconries, three prebends and six rectories.

Sir John Mundy and his wife Dame Juliane were both buried in the church in 1537, a year of plague mortality. A brick vault was constructed for Lady Mundy on the south side of the choir "neere unto the towe pyllers of the same syd". In 1538 the parish registers commenced, and survived intact until 1940 when they were partly incinerated. Early entries reflect the presence of the Shearmen community in Wood Street and the neighbouring parish of St Mary Magdalen, Milk Street. John Corbett, Shearman, had entailed considerable land and property in these parishes in 1509, which was to have benefited St Peter's in default of heirs. King Henry's incorporation of the Clothworkers (shearmen and fullers) in 1528–32 raised their status among the livery companies. The children of rising Clothworkers and future aldermen John Machell (Company Master, 1547) and his associate Richard Folkes (Master 1550) were baptized in St Peter's, and Machell buried his first wife there in 1544.

But it was Thomas Wood's legacy which became disputed when Alexander Meryng, who had married alderman Worley's widow Juliana (Wood), withheld property claimed by the Goldsmiths. In 1536 Meryng took forcible possession of premises occupied by goldsmith John Waberley, no less forcibly opposed by a crowd including ranking Clothworkers Edmund Sprott, Harry Getford and Laurence Karowe (of St Peter's), as well as the Chamberlain of London, George Medley. Edmund Sprott and John Aberley are noted in the account-books as Collectors for the Fraternity of the Holy Cross at St Peter's in 1533.

== Reforms ==
In 1539 the Abbey of St Alban's, patron of St Peter's, was dissolved: King Henry then granted the advowson to Lord Wriothesley, and it was inherited by his descendants the Earls of Southampton. On the death of Dr Gwent in 1543, however, one presentation lay in the gift of Baron Audley, and Dr John Gwynneth (of Castellmarch, at Abersoch in the Llŷn Peninsula) was instituted rector by Bishop Bonner. A composer of music, Gwynneth obtained a doctorate from Oxford University in 1531 by the submission of musical works. He was also a polemicist for Catholicism, publishing works against the teachings of John Fryth during the 1530s, a stance which faced a double revolution during his incumbency since Gwynneth remained rector until 1556. A Gentleman of the Chapel to Henry VIII, his carol My love that mourneth for me survives. His works included several masses for four or five voices. His sister Margaret was first the wife of the Cheapside Girdler Edward Awpart (died 1532), to whom Gwynneth was executor; she then became the first wife of Stephen Vaughan, who also made Gwynneth his executor in 1549, and left him the use of a room in the parish for lodgings for the space of nine years.

The succession of Edward VI in 1547 brought among its first acts the dissolution of the chantries, which concluded the obits of Faringdon and the other benefactors as William Abey went to his rest. In these affairs the City's three trustees included Augustine Hynde, Master of the Clothworkers in 1545, alderman for Cripplegate 1547–54 and Sheriff in 1550–51. Hynde, who had served his apprenticeship in St Peter's parish, was the senior associate of Machell and Folkes, and occupied a large and richly-furnished house in Wood Street in St Peter's parish. During the late 1530s his former apprentice Rowland Edwardes, master and kinsman of Rowland Hayward, occupied the new premises on the north frontage of Cheapside east of Milk Street. Hayward married Joan, daughter of William Tyllesworth, under-treasurer for the Canterbury mint, at St Peter's in 1546. Hynde, elder figure of this group, died in 1554, the first year of Queen Mary. After a heraldic funeral procession, his friends and executors, with discretion striking out two lines of Protestant formula from his will, raised his tomb in the south wall of St Peter's church, where it remained when most others had been removed.

So the accumulated litany binding the endowments and prayers of the churches to the ancestral civic twilight was unravelled. In the Edwardian reform the Rood itself (though not the Rood-loft) and some images were removed from the church, in accordance with the order of 22 September 1547, and the altars were either replaced with tables or otherwise changed. Some clearance of the old tombs took place by 1550–1551, when John Machell and others bought various of the stones and latten from the wardens. The appearance of the church tower at this date is suggested in the panorama of Edward VI's Coronation procession through Cheapside, which survives only as an 18th-century copy of a lost contemporary mural at Cowdray House. Although the cityscape is compressed, a plain square tower, crenellated, with paired belfry windows and a pyramidal roof is shown in the correct position on the west side of Wood Street, among houses just north (i.e. forward) of the Cheapside Cross.

At Mary I's accession all the city churches were commanded to go in procession and sing Te Deum. Edmund Bonner having been reinstated as Bishop of London, John Gwynneth republished his refutations of John Fryth's doctrines, and another book against heretics, at the London press of Thomas Berthelet, though he gave his Brief Declaration of the notable Victory given of God to oure Soueraygne Lady, Quene Marye on 23 July 1553 in his church of St Mary's at Luton rather than at St Peter's. The cat hanged at Cheapside Cross in April suggested the local mood. In 1555 a new Rood with attendant images of St Mary and St John (forming a Stabat Mater) was acquired for St Peter's from "Mounslow"; the font was repaired, given a new wainscot cover and relined with lead; the Easter Sepulchre was repaired, and Father Howe mended the organs; Mr Sympson was provided with bricks and mortar to set up the altars, and a marble altar-stone was procured; a Lenten cross, hanging Paschal basin and Paschal taper, and a desk with latten lions' feet were brought in, and a quantity of materials was needed for the hallowing of the altars.

John Gwynneth resigned from the parish c. 1556, at the height of the Marian persecutions, and Richard Smith was instituted in his place by Bonner. Volumes of homilies, processioners, antiphoner and legend-book were bought in 1556, the vestry with its three priests' chambers (which since 1475 had been rented) was finally purchased, and a dial was set up under an external suspended frame. At the procession through London of King Philip and Queen Mary in March 1556/57 the city waites stood on the roof of the church to play as they passed, and the bell-ringers were paid for the day. The mood of the trades and craftsmen was strongly Reformist, rooted in the Lollard traditions. However, it is by a modern mis-reading of the Mint under-treasurer William Tyllesworth's request, in his 1557 will, to be buried "in a convenient place" at St Peter's, that his supposed membership "in a covenant plan" has been wrongly predicated. Nor was there wanting celebration in the great funeral dinners of this age, as for that of alderman Machell in August 1558 going from his house (formerly Hynde's) in Wood Street to his parish church of St Mary Magdalen in Milk Street.

== The Elizabethan church ==
No time was lost in 1558 in taking down the Rood again, and now the Rood-loft itself was broken up and sold; a year later "St Peter's Tabernacle" and the holy water stock were cut away by a mason. On 14 January 1559, during her royal progress through the City, Queen Elizabeth I was presented with a Bible in English as she passed the church door. With this turn, Richard Smith continued as parson until his burial in the midst of the choir in 1570, but through the 1560s William Porrage (ordained in 1560 by Bishop Grindal) was curate or minister of the parish. Porrage had taken refuge in Calais with his friend Thomas Sprat during Mary's reign, and had narrowly escaped capture during a furtive visit to Sandwich. Many new books were acquired, first a Great Bible, Service Book, Paraphrases, and 20 song-books (1559); the Book of Articles (1560); Homilies, prayers and thanksgivings in time of plague (1562–63 and 1568–69); prayerbooks and thanksgivings for the Turks' overthrow; and a book of prayer for the Queen's Majesty (1569). It became customary to ring the bells on 18 November to commemorate the royal anniversary. A chain was bought for the Bible, and a Table of the Ten Commandments was set up. Hour-glasses were bought to time the sermons in 1562 and 1563; in 1566 the organs were sold by consent of the parish, and in 1567 carpenters installed "a pulpet for Mr Porredge to stand in".

Aldermen and Mayors

Alderman Humphrey Baskerville, Master of the Mercers in 1560, was buried here in 1563, and in the following year his widow Jane (Pakington) remarried in this church to the Mercer and Adventurer Lionel Duckett. In 1560 the Wardship of Farringdon Within had passed from alderman Thomas Curteys, the eminent Pewterer, to Richard Chamberlin, Ironmonger, who was constituted Master of that Company by Queen Elizabeth's confirmation charter to them in that year. Through the 1560s Chamberlin, Christopher Draper and Alexander Avenon alternated in the Mastership, and Avenon (alderman for Cripplegate) served as Sheriff in 1561–62, and Chamberlin in 1562-3. With Chamberlin's death in 1566 Draper became Lord Mayor and Avenon moved to the aldermanry of Farringdon Within, serving as Lord Mayor in 1569–70 through the fourth of his eight terms as Master of the Ironmongers. In that Mayoral year 1570 Avenon's first wife Dame Elizabeth was buried in Lady Mundy's vault in the choir of St Peter's. Rowland Hayward, his successor as Mayor in 1570–71, was familiar with the church's associations with Hynde, Machell and Tyllesworth: Hynde's tomb was re-opened in 1569 for the burial of his wife, who had remarried to Sir John Lyon. In 1572 various expenses were laid out at St Peter's for painting over and trimming the Lord Mayor's and Lady Mayoress's pews with say cloth and lace, and for the making of settles. Sir Alexander Avenon remained alderman for the Ward until 1578, and was buried at St Peter's in 1590.

Edmund Sympson

The Earl of Southampton granted advowson for lifetime to Thomas Clerke of the Inner Temple, who presented Edmund Sympson, aged 26, as Rector in 1571. Sympson held the benefice until his death in 1580. He had distinguished himself as a Scholar at Pembroke College, Cambridge (M.A. and Fellow, 1568), where he was University Preacher in 1570, and from 1574 he was also Rector of St Dunstan-in-the-East. In 1575 he was awarded Bachelor of Divinity. At Christmas 1571 three loads of snow had to be carried off from St Peter's, but candles were bought for evening prayer on Christmas Eve, and the custom of bringing in holly, rosemary and bays was kept up. Bells were rung for victory over the Turks. A new font with wainscot cover was installed in 1572–73, the poppy-head pews were repaired, and the choir had new pews (25 wainscots) in 1575. The book of Paraphrases was mended and chained, and in 1576 a copy of Alexander Nowell's Catechism was acquired. Sympson kept a book for records of sermons given and gatherings by licence.

Following the libel of John Stubbs, Sympson was among the city rectors summoned in 1579 by Dr William Aubrey to hear a proclamation against the spreading of civil disquiet by preachers, commanding them not to entangle themselves with secular matters. Sympson's will is informal, commencing: "I will not in any wise that Jane Sympson my daughter nor any goods of myne whiche after my deathe maie come to her, Doe come unto the custodie or possession of anie of the kindred of her Mother." He adds that he might have trusted her grandmother, but she is too old to prevent his legacy from being "distracted per vicissitudines into many handes", and so entrusts all, including the daughter, to his father and brother. Comparatively little is known of his successor, John Jones, M.A., rector until 1585. Special prayers were said after the earthquake of 1580. A lectureship was established at St Peter's in 1583. In 1584 the window over the south porch was repaired by which the waits gained access to the flat roof. Red wands were procured "for them that have the plague": in the late Elizabethan period London was afflicted with severe epidemics.

Richard Judson

For thirty years, from 1585 to 1615, Richard Judson held the benefice of St Peter's, Samuel Cottesford (author of A Treatise against Traitors) being recorded as minister in 1585. Judson entered Trinity College, Cambridge in 1566, taking B.A. in 1570/71, and was incorporated at the University of Oxford for his M.A. in 1574. The Dean and chapter of Canterbury Cathedral appointed him Rector of St John the Evangelist Friday Street in 1580 (until 1586), with which he held the Crown benefice of Greens Norton, Northamptonshire (Peterborough) from 1584 to 1589. In 1583 he became Rector of St Peter le Poer (London) and he was inducted to St Peter Westcheap on 15 May 1585. These two he held until his death in 1615. In 1588 Thomas Pratt was licensed his curate.

Judson was presented by Thomas Clerke, now holding the advowson from Henry Wriothesley, 3rd Earl of Southampton. Judson himself was granted the right to present his own successor, which in 1615 was exercised by his kinsman and administrator Thomas Judson of Daventry. Following the Star Chamber decree of 1586 regulating printing, in 1588 Richard Judson was among the select group of clergymen deputed by the Archbishop of Canterbury and Bishop of London to license or censor books for publication, through the Worshipful Company of Stationers. On 6 July 1593 Judson notably gave personal approval for William Jones to print the first edition of Christopher Marlowe's play Edward II, very soon after Marlowe's death. Thomas Judson (who printed William Shakespeare's The Passionate Pilgrim in 1599 before selling his business in 1601) was son of the Master Stationer John Judson (died 1589), and had a brother named Richard, but it is unclear whether this was the parson of St Peter Westcheap.

The bells were rung for the death of Mary, Queen of Scots in 1587. Sir Lionel Duckett, who had served as Lord Mayor in 1572–73, was a parishioner: in 1588 he left £8 per annum between the parishes of St Peter and St Mary Magdalen for the poor at Christmas. Judson frequently signed the church accounts until 1601, and was active in both parishes: he officiated at the funeral of Lord Mayor Martin Calthorp at St Peter le Poer in May 1589, and presumably for Avenon's at Westcheap in 1590. Sir Richard Martin, alderman for Farringdon Within 1578–1598, completed Calthorp's term as Mayor, was Master of the Goldsmiths in 1592–93, served his own Mayoralty in 1594, and had his second marriage at St Peter Westcheap in 1599. A new Lord Mayor's pew was constructed in 1590 (on the south side at the east end), and the "Green Men" had their weapons and shields refurbished. Through the 1590s several dinners are recorded, including those for the parson, curate, wardens and sidesmen at the Visitations, and for beating the bounds on Ascension Day. In 1595 the Calvinist preacher Dr Thomas Crooke delivered sermons, and in 1597 was appointed Reader at St Peter's.

== The later church ==
Through the Elizabethan period various efforts were made to have the Cheapside Cross removed. Both the reformed clergy and the puritans objected to the daily sight of foreigners and superstitious people kneeling and taking their hats off to the carved figures, and it was frequently vandalized and badly restored. As the surmounting cross fell into decay, royal approval was given for its repair in 1600, "respecting especially the antiquitie and continuance of that monument, an ancient ensigne of Christianitie", not least to avoid giving encouragement to the more radical dissenting factions.

The church accounts of 1600 refer to "the gret yron barred cheste which standeth at the upper ende of the Churche", of which the contents were "not to be seene but by the consent of the wholle bodie of the parishe or the Chiefest of them": to this the parson and churchwardens held the keys. The churchwardens also had responsibility for the stocks, which were repaired in 1603. In 1601 John Ashbell is the minister, whose Crown appointment to the benefice of Abberton, Worcestershire (into which he entered in 1600) lapsed in 1602, when Ralph Sheldon presented another candidate. The new century begins with John Stow's antiquarian retrospect, which tells us (1603) that it is "a proper church, lately new builded", and states that the monument to Augustine Hynde "doth yet remaine, the others be gone". The extent of this late Elizabethan reconstruction is not known. A record of 1590 refers to the gravestone of William Peryn in the south aisle, which had four "pictures of brasse upon the stone", and another of 1602 mentions "a greate stone that hath the Crosse of brasse in it" in the midst of the middle aisle. Whatever was done, the clearance was not exhaustive. In 1610 Richard Judson was concerned with unpaid tithes, over which he had dealings with Sir Richard Martyn in the London Consistory court.

Daniel Votier

At Judson's death in 1615, in fulfilment of the right of advowson granted to him, Thomas Judson of Daventry presented Daniel Votier ("Vocher") as his successor as Rector. Born c. 1583, Daniel was a scholar of St Paul's School, London, and entered Trinity College, Oxford in 1599, taking B.A. in 1603 and M.A. in 1607. He was ordained deacon (1607) and priest (1611) by John Bridges, having delivered a sermon to the Mercers' Company in 1609-10. Soon after his induction, in 1616–1617 repairs were carried out at St Peter's at a cost to the parishioners of £314. Votier's first wife died in 1618 leaving him with two little daughters. He remarried at once, to Martha Taylor, and his next daughter Elizabeth was born blind in 1620: the parish granted her a weekly allowance of two shillings. Several younger children were baptized between 1622 and 1632 in St Mary Magdalen Bermondsey.

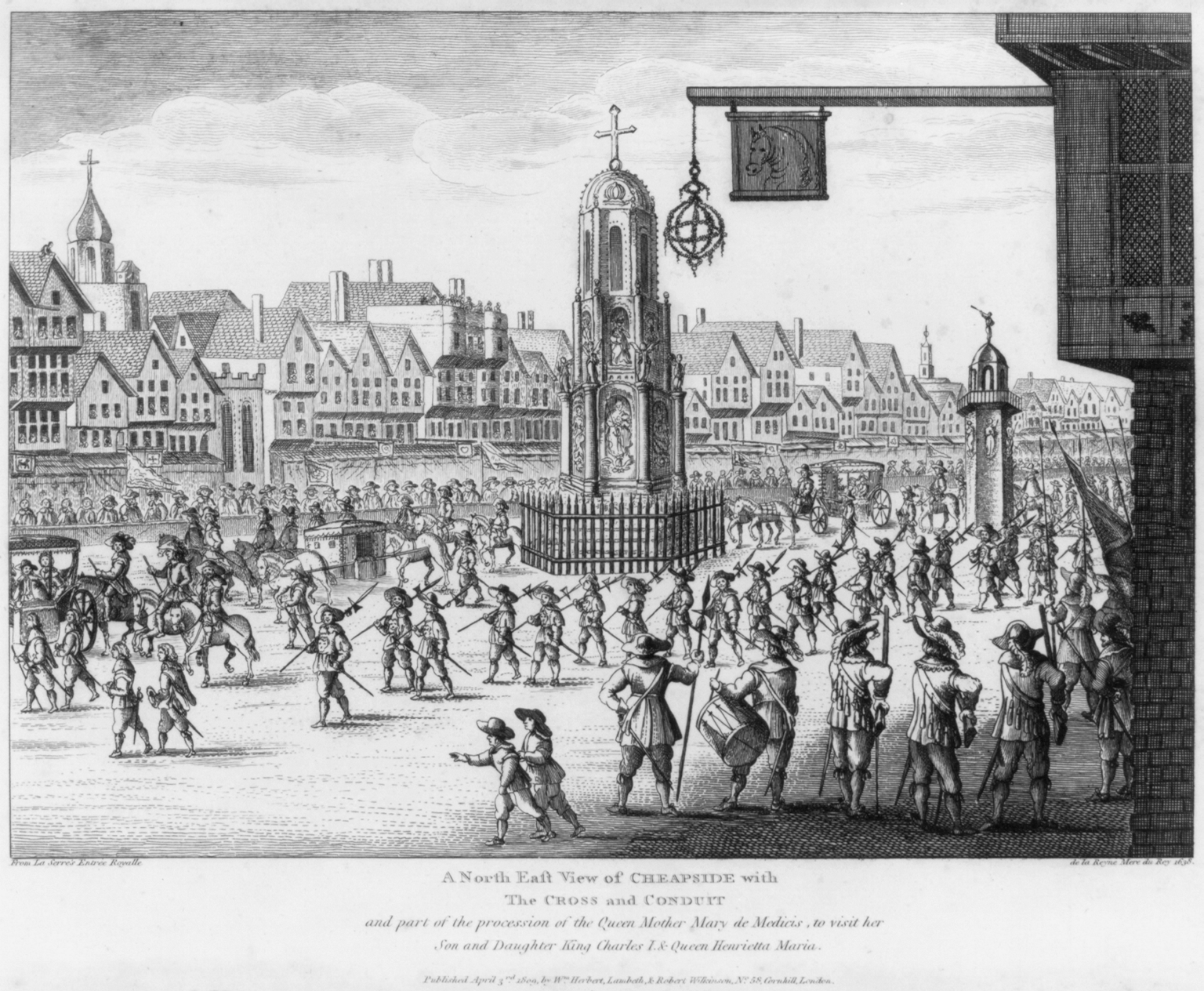
Westcheap in 1639, engraved 1809 after La Serre 1639, showing (mid-left) the crenellated south frontage, and possibly the tower, of St Peter's church

In 1633 St Peter's acquired its own copy of John Stow's Survey of London (presumably in Anthony Munday's edition of that year), so that the description it contains was a muniment of the church when it was yet standing. They also bought "a book of Bishop Jewell", presumably the Apology of the Church of England. An Inventory was taken in the same year. In 1634 Sir Martin Lumley (Lord Mayor 1623–24) was buried in the church. A Reader's Pew was constructed or allocated in 1637. The south front, and perhaps the tower, of St Peter's church as it appeared in 1639 are glimpsed in Jean Puget de la Serre's view of the progress of Marie de' Medici through Cheapside.

Votier was of Puritan outlook: his wife's brother was stepfather of Edward Rawson of Massachusetts, and the second husband of Margaret, sister of John Wilson of Boston. In about 1636 Bishop Laud threatened to suspend Votier for preaching the doctrine that some are Elect, and some reprobate, and that Christ died only for the elect: but after an hour's disputation the case was dismissed. Not one to hold back, he next gave offence by his preaching against Hypocrisy: a parishioner (who may have felt 'pointed out') took offence and complained to the Bishop, and Votier was suspended for his doctrines. Having refused to take the Oath, and having been unable to persuade a young Separatist of its lawfulness, he was committed to the Fleet Prison, whereupon he submitted and was released.

He then (about 1638) went into the Netherlands, looking for a situation to remain there permanently, but after six months was summoned on a bond of £100 to suffer the censure of the Court of High Commission. In 1639 Votier sent his son, James (1622), to New Inn Hall, Oxford, who became a nonconformist minister in north Suffolk. In 1641 Votier made his will, complaining that Martha had "carried herself treacherously and rebelliously towards me about the space of twenty years, and not becoming a wife of a peaceable conversation" – and that her brother had never paid him more than half his marriage settlement money. When Votier died in 1646 he was buried in the chancel vault of St Peter's Westcheap. His executor, John Yates, citizen and Goldsmith, refused to act, and his widow (who was left to administrate) was buried there in 1651. Her brother died soon afterwards.

The dismantling of the episcopal structure in 1640–42 enabled Votier to petition the House of Commons in 1643 seeking redress for his persecution by Laud. But the emergence of Presbyterian governance underlay irreconcileable differences which arose between him and the elders and wardens of St Peter's, Votier refusing to meet them or to accept arbitration, or to say against whom he felt grievances. At this time the Cheapside Cross was torn down as a "Monument of Superstition and Idolatry". In 1645 Votier's parish was sequestered by the Westminster Assembly, and Ruling Elders Richard Floyd, John Dod, Richard Overton and others were elected by the church members. Floyd and Overton supported the City's petition of 1645–46 for strong Presbyterian governance, and St Peter's was organized within the Fifth London Classis. Two ministers were appointed to encourage peaceable coexistence with the congregation late in 1646, and six months later Dr Roger Drake, a staunch Presbyterian, was invited to accept the position, but for various reasons declined. In 1648 approaches were made to another minister, who kept them waiting so long for an answer that a year later the wardens agreed to employ preachers as needed. This reflected the collapse of Presbyterian influence in 1648–49.

Roger Drake

Roger Drake's first career as physician, through his training at Pembroke College, Cambridge (B.A. 1627–28, M.A. 1631) (where his brother Richard followed), and at Leyden with Johannes Walaeus in 1638–40 reached its crisis in 1646 when he resigned his candidature for the College of Physicians and decided to follow a religious vocation. In 1648 he published his Sacred Chronologie of Scriptural events from the Creation until the time of Jesus Christ. Drake and his brother Richard (also a clergyman) became involved with Christopher Love in the Presbyterian plot to restore the monarchy, and in May 1651 he was among the ministers imprisoned for treason.

Drake had long connections with the parish, where his father (also Roger, of Somerset parentage) was a merchant parishioner, Master of the Clothworkers' Company in 1639, with house and shop (assessed at £90, the highest of the parish) on the Westcheap frontage in 1638. John Brewer (nephew of Drake the Clothworker), was an early planter in Warwick, Virginia, where he died in 1635. Roger the elder made very substantial loans "on the publique ffaith of the late Parliament begun in 1640" which were still owing in 1650, when he made a legacy to "twenty orthodox preachers suspended by Parliament for maintaining the truth of the Gospell against all Innovators (whether Presbiterian or Independent) according to the doctrine and discipline of our mother the Church of England". His will was proved in March 1651/52, making Roger and Richard his executors. "His treatment at the hands of the Parliamentary authorities indicates that he was no friend to their cause", a historian adds.

After the execution of Christopher Love, Drake and others were released and pardoned, and he became minister of St Peter Westcheap in 1653. This was presumably with the support of Maximilian Bard, alderman and Sheriff in 1651 and Master of the Girdlers' Company in 1652 (brother of the 1st Viscount Bellomont), who was elected Ruling Elder of St Peter Westcheap in 1652. During his ministry Drake lived in the rector's house in Phillip Lane. He lost no time in returning to controversy: in 1652 he published the first direct challenge to John Humfrey's views on free admission to the Lord's Supper, in his A Boundary to the Holy Mount, and (following Humfrey's rejoinder) in The Bar against Free Admission to the Lord's Supper, Fixed in 1656. The debate formulated significant preoccupations of the time. Drake was a Moderator at the 13th London Provincial Assembly. Ejected at the Restoration, he returned to Physick and died in 1669. His character was greatly admired. Richard Drake became a royal chaplain and Chancellor of Sarum.

The final years

George Davenport, M.A., a Leicestershire man who studied at Emmanuel College, Cambridge (B.A. 1649–50, M.A. 1653), was appointed to the Rectory of St Peter Westcheap in January 1661. He became rector of Houghton-le-Spring in County Durham in 1664, left St Peter's in 1665, and never saw it again. His letters have survived in some number and are published. George Woodward, M.A., succeeded Davenport on 2 February 1665. He is taken to be one who had graduated from Magdalen Hall, Oxford, in 1621, aged 20, and if so he was the oldest holder of the benefice for many years. He entered upon a melancholy scene, for the year of 1665 brought with it the Great Plague of London. The account of a Wood Street grocer who imposed quarantine in his house, attributed to Daniel Defoe, is only part-historical. Eighteen months after Woodward's induction, in September 1666, the long history of St Peter Westcheap as a functioning church came to a sudden end, the Fire sweeping away the plague and the city together. He was appointed Rector of East Mersea, Essex, on 3 February 1668, and died within the year.

== Destruction and later use ==
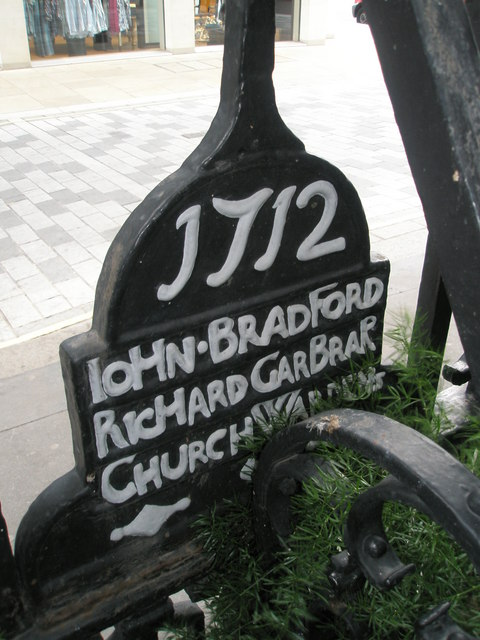
Churchwardens' plaque in the churchyard railings erected in 1719

Along with the majority of the parish churches in the City, St Peter's was destroyed in the Great Fire of London of 1666. A Rebuilding Act was passed in 1670 and a committee set up under Sir Christopher Wren. It was decided to rebuild 51 of the churches, but St Peter's was not among them. Instead the parish and rectory was united with that of St Matthew Friday Street. The parochial infrastructure however continued, with its accounts and finances, not least because the site of the church and churchyard continued to be used for burials. The four shops along Cheapside, of which three now survive, are said to have been built on the site of the "Long Shop" of 1401, which was formerly leased for the benefit of the parish. An original stone tablet records that, in their first form, they were "Erected att ye sole Costs & charges of the Parish of St Peters Cheape, A[nn]o D[omi]ni 1687. William Howard, Jeremiah Taverner, Church Wardens." They became the freehold property of the City Parochial Foundation (1891, becoming the Trust for London in 2010). From early times the leases included a clause permitting the lessors to go on the roofs to witness royal and civic processions.

The churchyard was enclosed with the fine ornate railings (which still enclose it) in 1712, as is shown by an iron plaque incorporated into them beneath the integral lantern-bracket. On the exterior (street side) this shows an image of St Peter and on the inner side the names of the presiding churchwardens John Bradford and Richard Garbrak, with the date. Worked into the ironwork beneath the lamp bracket are the Crossed Keys, emblem of St Peter. The celebrated Wood Street plane tree (see below) was planted here both to perpetuate the memory of the former church and to beautify the spot in its crowded surroundings as a suitable graveyard and garden, at a date not exactly known, as part of the same process of transformation. The use for burials continued in vaults on the south side of the churchyard, where the last burial occurred in 1838, and in the churchyard itself, which received its last interment in 1846. The vaults of St Peter's were officially closed by Order of Council on 18 March 1859. Three gravestones remain.

The Wood Street plane tree

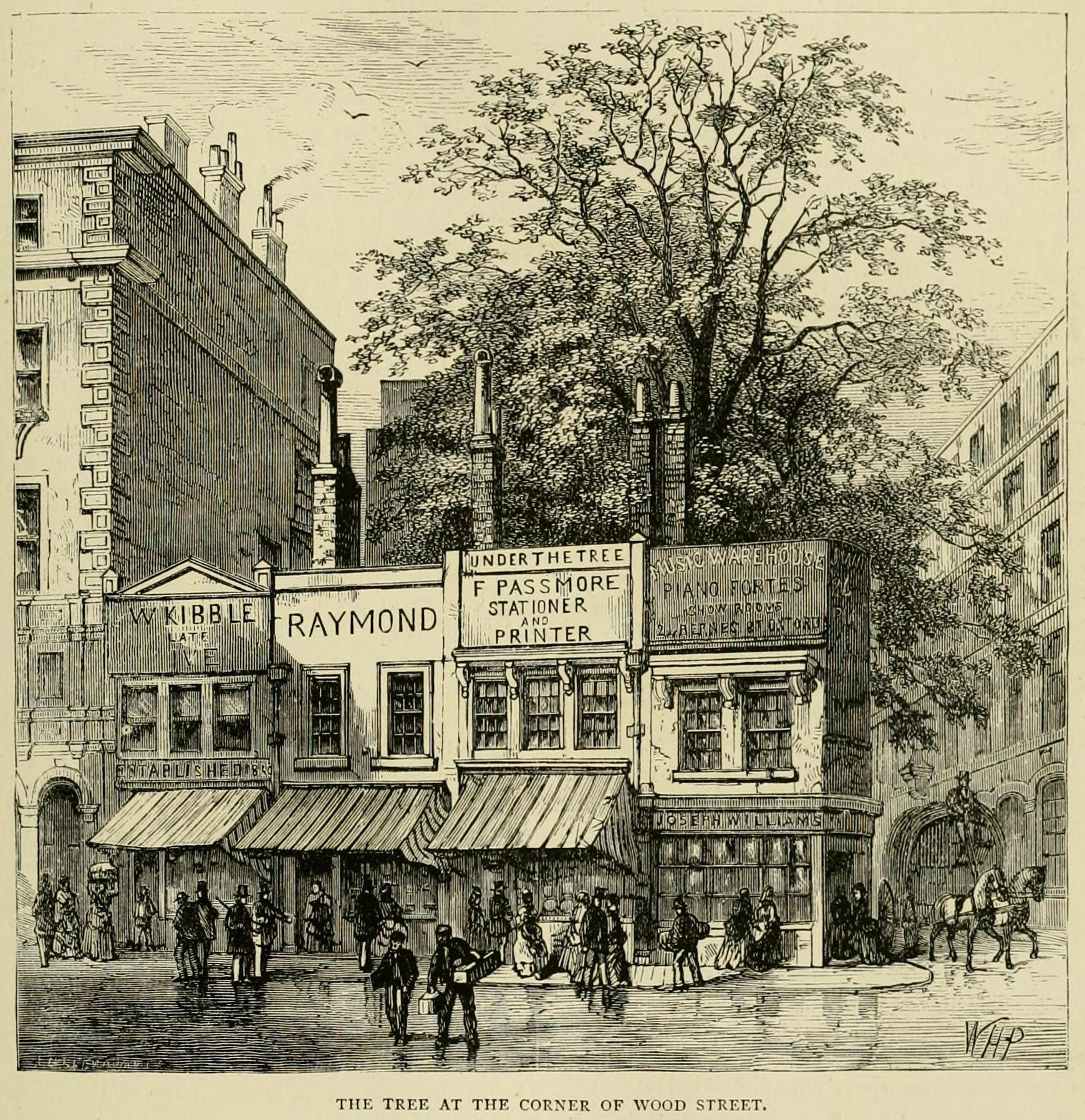
Mid-19th century illustration of the Wood Street plane tree and Cheapside shops, reprinted 1878

The great London Plane tree which grows on the site of St Peter's church has stood for centuries, through the devastation of its surroundings in the second great fire, in December 1940, and now vies with the tall modern buildings of Wood Street which surround it. The garden is suggested by William Wordsworth in his poem "The Reverie of Poor Susan" (written in 1797 at Alfoxton), which begins:

"At the corner of Wood Street, when daylight appears,
Hangs a Thrush that sings loud, it has sung for three years"

The poet originally wrote, "There's a bird...", but amended it to "Hangs", apparently meaning to signify birds which were kept in hanging cages. He said that it arose from his "observation of the affecting music of these birds hanging in this way in the London streets during the freshness and stillness of the spring morning". This gives much sharper point to Poor Susan's dream of escaping from London to her countryside home, and to the poem's final (printed 1800, later suppressed) verse in which she, in her father's house, will "hear the thrush sing from a tree of its own". If this dispels the idyll of the thrush singing in the plane tree, the presence of a tree in the churchyard may have supplied the conjunction of ideas to Wordsworth.

In her 1958 book “The Virgin of Aldermanbury”, Madeleine Henrey writes passionately about this little corner of the City, revealing it also to be a favourite spot for her father-in-law, who in the late 19th century was curate at nearby St Botolph’s Aldersgate. She wrote: “...in 1821 three churchwardens planted a sapling at the cost of sixpence where the medieval church had stood.” This is the only known historic reference to the planting date of the tree. Henrey does not note the source of this information, and there is no record in the churchwarden account book for that year. However, Henrey's history of the original church and the adjacent shops appear accurately and faithfully researched. The City of London Corporation 2012 Tree Strategy document concurs with the planting date of 1821. Even if this date is not 100% reliable, the tree is certainly older than 1850, the gross under-estimate alarmingly propagated in official City of London Corporation planning documents of 2017. Maps of the late 18th and early 19th century show the churchyard as a blank space, including the 1819 edition of Richard Horwood's Plan of the Cities of London and Westminster. However, an 1842 revision depicts what appears to be a tree.

Platanus thrives in smoky and enclosed environments, Whenever it was planted, it didn't take long for this plane tree to become a landmark in the City. Perhaps arising from Wordsworth's poem, a sustained interest in its avian population developed. In 1831 James Mitchell (scientist, 1787–1844) remarked that "a pair of crows have this spring taken up their abode within the city, and built their nest in the top of the lofty plane-tree in Wood-street, close to Cheapside". A similar report of 1832 calls it "a fine solitary plane tree".

In 1834–35 Leigh Hunt wrote of it, "there is a tree occupying the space of a house in that most civic and populous thoroughfare" (i.e. Cheapside). "It stands at the corner of Wood Street": the point of his words was that it was highly conspicuous. By 1848 he added that it was "ostentatiously visible". In 1850 Alfred Smee commented that there were then four rooks' nests in it, and that having walked past that tree every day for twenty years he could remember when the first nest appeared. In 1870 the Revd. Sparrow Simpson (a respected antiquary, father of the librettist of that name) stated that the rooks had gone, though one of their nests remained "tenanted by a colony of audacious sparrows". He added that the rooks were said to have been shot with an air-gun from the windows of a neighbouring warehouse by some idle apprentice. The tree remains, its roots once nourished by the bones of Nicholas de Farndon (junior) and the rest, and its huge leaves still whispering their requiems.

In 2011, London writer and poet Frank Molloy wrote the verse "Last of the Mohicans" about the psycho-geographic power of the tree. The poem was included in his 2020 book Soul City Wandering.

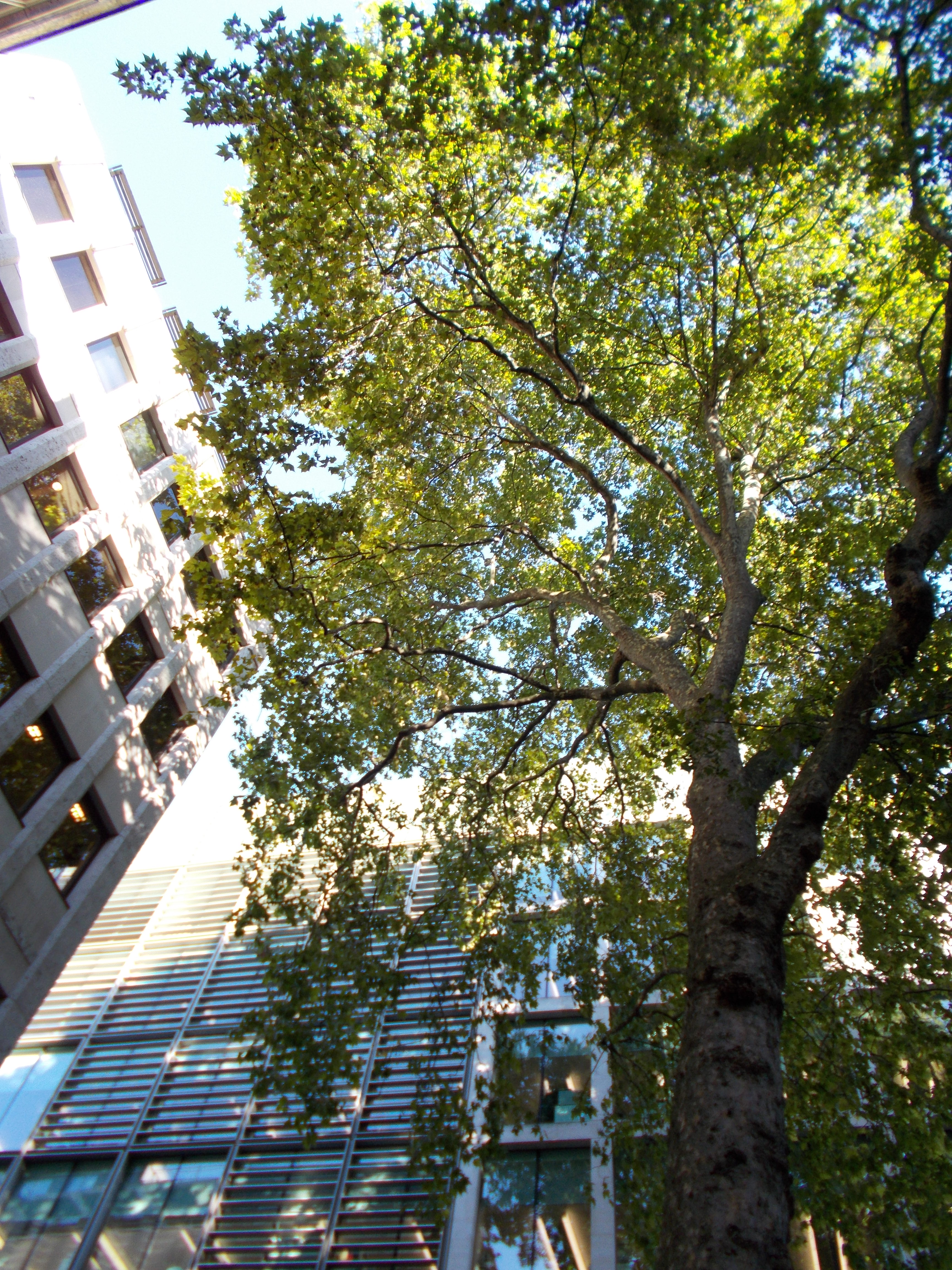
Canopy of the Wood Street plane tree

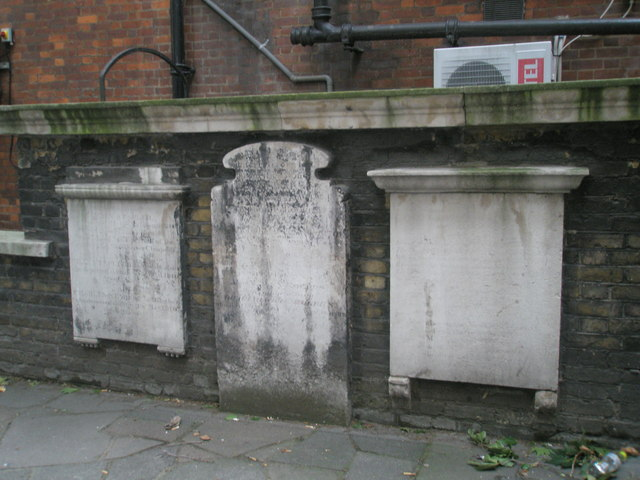
Ancient gravestones in the garden

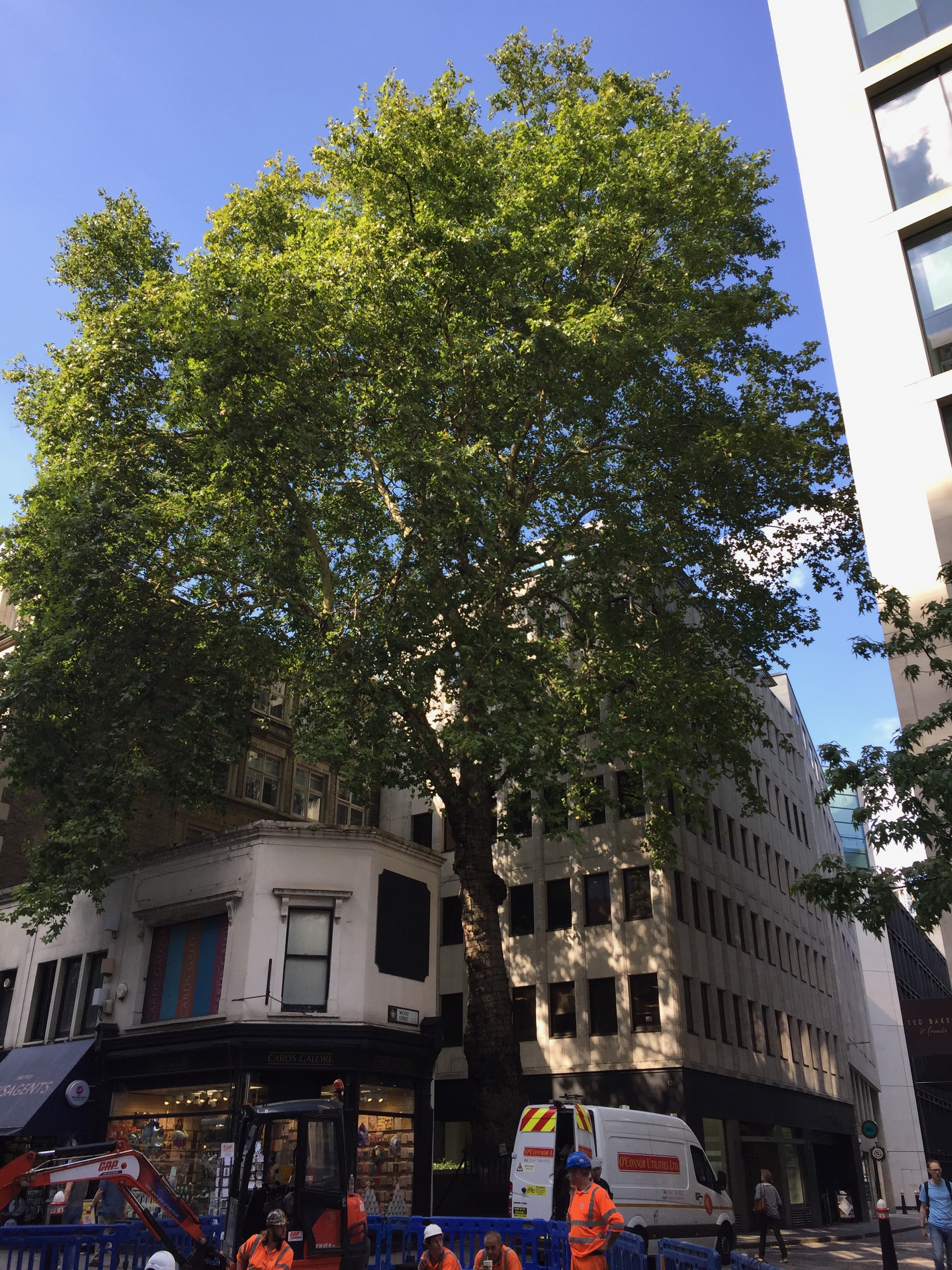
The Wood Street plane tree
