= Lumley Park Burn =

River in North East England

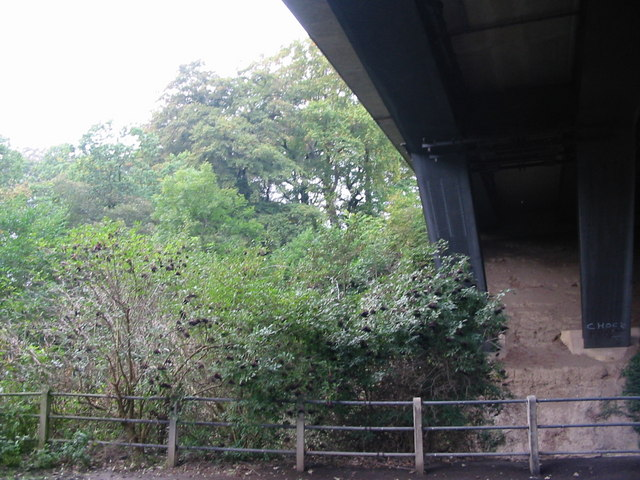
- Lumley Park Burn under the A1M.

- Location of the mouth within County Durham

Location
- County: England
- County: County Durham; Tyne and Wear
- Settlements: •Chester-le-Street •Houghton-le-Spring •Hetton-le-Hole

Physical characteristics
- Source
  - location: Hetton-le-Hole
  - coordinates: 54°50′18″N 1°25′22″W
- Mouth
  - location: Chester-le-Street
  - coordinates: 54°51′19″N 1°33′44″W
- Length: 12.5 km (7.8 mi)

Basin features
- Tributaries
  - left: Red Burn, Hetton Burn
  - right: Herrington Burn

The Lumley Park Burn is a small river between County Durham and Tyne and Wear that is a tributary of the River Wear and flows by Lumley Castle. Its length is around 12.5km (7.8mi).

== Course ==
Its source near to Hetton-le-Hole, where it is known as Rough Dene Burn. Then changing its name to Rainton Burn, the Hetton Burn confluences into the river, and it flows by Houghton-le-Spring northward. Flowing by Chilton Moor, it is known as the Moors Burn, and the Herrington Burn flows into the river. Finally, it is known as the Lumley Park Burn, where it flows by Lumley Castle, and into the River Wear at Chester-le-Street.

== Conservation ==
Since 2012, Wear Rivers Trust have built fish passes to allow salmon and trout to spawn in the river.
