= George Lumley, 3rd Baron Lumley =

English nobleman and soldier

George Lumley, 3rd Baron Lumley, (1445–1509) was an English nobleman and soldier. Depending on the source, he may be referred to as either the 2nd Baron Lumley (of the second creation) or the 3rd Baron Lumley (of the first creation), due to the attainder of his ancestor Ralph Lumley.

== Family ==
George Lumley was the only son of Thomas Lumley, 2nd Baron Lumley, by his wife Margaret Harington. His direct paternal ancestor, Ralph Lumley, had been created Baron Lumley in the reign of Richard II, but was later attainted and executed for his role in the Epiphany Rising against Henry IV. George Lumley's father, Thomas, had the attainder reversed and was raised to the peerage in 1461 by his cousin, Edward IV. George Lumley succeeded to the barony upon his father's death in 1485.

== Career ==
George Lumley held a number of positions of trust over the course of his lifetime, including Sheriff of Northumberland from 1462 to 1463, Knight of the Shire in 1466, and Sheriff of Northumberland again from 1468 to 1471. He was one of the commanders of the forces of the Duke of Gloucester that retook Berwick, and served in Scotland again in 1502 under the Earl of Surrey. He was part of the English escort of Princess Margaret to Scotland in 1503.

== Marriage and children ==
Lumley married Elizabeth Thornton, daughter of Roger Thornton, a wealthy Newcastle merchant, by his wife Elizabeth Greystoke (daughter of John Greystoke, 4th Baron Greystoke). They had three sons (Thomas, Ralph, and Roger). The eldest son and heir, Thomas, married a natural daughter of Edward IV by Elizabeth Lucy.

While Lumley's wife, as the legal heir of her father, brought significant wealth with her, the marriage also brought a family conflict with it. Lumley acquired several manors by marriage, but the inheritance of these lands was disputed by his wife's half-brother, Giles Thornton, an illegitimate son of Roger Thornton. The dispute was bitter and violent, ultimately culminating in Lumley slaying his unacknowledged brother-in-law "in the ditch of Windsor Castle."

== Death and succession ==
Lumley is stated to have died in the last year of Henry VII (1509), though other sources give the date as 1508. His eldest son and heir, Thomas, had predeceased him, and as a result the barony passed to his heir, Richard Lumley, 4th Baron Lumley

Peerage of England
Preceded by Thomas Lumley, 2nd Baron Lumley	Baron Lumley; 1485–1509	Succeeded by Richard Lumley, 4th Baron Lumley
