= Lumley-Savile =

Lemley-Savile is a compound surname which is borne by:

- Augustus William Lumley-Savile (1829–1887), English landowner and Queen Victoria's Assistant Master of the Ceremonies
- George Lumley-Savile, 3rd Baron Savile (1919–2008), English landowner
- John Lumley-Savile, 7th Earl of Scarbrough (1761–1835), British peer
- John Lumley-Savile, 8th Earl of Scarbrough (1788–1856), British peer and politician
- John Lumley-Savile, 2nd Baron Savile (1854–1931), British peer and diplomat

== See also ==
- Savile Lumley (1876–1960), English book illustrator and poster designer
