= Richard Lumley-Saunderson =

Richard Lumley-Saunderson may refer to:

- Richard Lumley-Saunderson, 4th Earl of Scarbrough (1725–1782)
- Richard Lumley-Saunderson, 6th Earl of Scarbrough (1757–1832), British politician

== See also ==
- Richard Lumley (disambiguation)
