= John Hovyngham =

Archdeacon of Durham, England (died 1417)

John Hovyngham (died 1417), also written Honyngham or Ovyngham, was an English clergyman, notary, diplomat and Archdeacon of Durham.

== Education and early career ==
Hovyngham studied at the University of Oxford, where he graduated as Bachelor of Civil Law before 1396. His parents – his father William and mother Joan – were buried in St Peter's, York.

He was appointed by King Richard II in 1396 to the benefice of St Peter, Westcheap in the City of London, where in or before 1402 he was the recipient of a grant of land and property to the church for the maintenance of its perpetual chantry for the souls of Nicholas de Farndone and of the King. He obtained the degree of Doctor of Civil Law by 1406, when King Henry IV pardoned and approved a papal bull granting Hovyngham a canonry and prebend in each of the Cathedral churches of St Peter's, York and St Paul's, London, and a greater dignity in one or the other, provided that this did not extend to elective benefices. From 1405 he served on commissions to deliberate in important cases of appeal against judgements, particularly concerning maritime or Admiralty affairs, including the unjust capture of ships of Brittany.

== Archdeacon of Durham ==
In 1406, at the appointment of Thomas Langley as Bishop of Durham, Hovyngham was present as the advocate of the Court of Canterbury at Langley's nomination of Thomas Weston as Archdeacon of Durham. King Henry nominated Richard Kelsterne, King's clerk, to receive a pension from the bishop as a provision of Langley's elevation until the nominee should obtain a benefice. In November 1408 or February 1409 Hovyngham himself was collated as Archdeacon of Durham and ratified 12 April 1409, and granted the benefice of Waldegrave, Northamptonshire, in the Diocese of Lincoln, whereupon Kelsterne succeeded him in the benefice of St Peter's Westcheap.

From references in Hovyngham's will to Kirkbymoorside, Byland Abbey and Skipwith, it seems possible that he is "John de Honyngham" the canon of St Mary's, Newburgh Priory (York diocese), who as perpetual vicar of "Kirby super moram" sought a papal indult in 1410–1411 to let to farm the fruits of the vicarage, when studying at university or living in some safe place. While living in the church he had been set upon by robbers, of whom there were many thereabouts, who had threatened him that unless he gave them money they would come back and kill him.

Hovyngham was favoured by King Henry V, who in October 1413 appointed him King's Notary in Chancery, succeeding Ralph Grenehurst, with an annual life pension of 50 marks. As the King's ambassador he negotiated a general truce by land and sea with the Archdeacon of Gourdon, on behalf of John II King of Castile and Leon, for one year from February 1414. At the same time he met with the commissioners of the Duke of Brittany to conclude a renewal of truce. Ratified in his archdiaconate, through 1414 he was engaged in several further cases of appeal, on occasion with John Kemp, Thomas Felde (Dean of Hereford) or Richard Whittington.

In June 1414 he was sent, together with Henry Lord Scrope of Masham, Thomas Chaucer, Hugh Mortimer and Philip Morgan, as proctors for King Henry in order to conclude a league, confederation and friendship with John the Fearless, Duke of Burgundy, and to receive his homage as a vassal of the English king. They were to accept one of the Duke's daughters as a prospective spouse for Henry, as part of a perpetual alliance against the Dukes of Orléans and Bourbon. Hovingham himself made two separate journeys. The great embassy was being conducted to Charles VI of France, with whom the Armagnac faction were making league, during the same months.

On 24 November 1414 Archdeacon Hovyngham was presented by the prior and convent of Durham to the Prebend of Skipwith in the collegiate church of Howden in the York diocese. In August 1415 he was among the assessors over whom Archbishop Chichele presided, at the London inquisition against the Lollard John Claydon of St Anne's near Aldersgate, who was subsequently burned at West Smithfield. Soon afterwards, as King Henry's preparations for the assault on France were in the final stages, Hovyngham was sent with Simon Flete as envoys to the Duke of Brittany to recruit his support, not returning until December of that year. The Duke brought out 6000 men, but was too slow in bringing them to Henry to be of service in his cause.

== Hovyngham's will ==
John Hovyngham died in 1417 leaving a lengthy Latin will dated 12 June. He leaves his body to be buried in the conventual church of St Bartholomew, London, or at Easington parish church if he should die in the Durham diocese. He leaves money for a year's masses on his behalf at St Bartholomew's, and to Easington for a principal vestment and attire suitable for a deacon and subdeacon, for ordination there before their high altar, so that one chaplain shall have an annual pension of six marks to celebrate for him in the chantry which John Calcroft formerly occupied in the said church. Other churches mentioned include St Peter Westcheap, St Lawrence Jewry, St Mary-le-Bow and St Andrew Cornhill in London, Bishop Auckland, Elvet (Durham), Newton Archidiaconi, Walgrave (Northamptonshire), Sedlescombe (Sussex), Sulhamstead Abbots near Reading (Berkshire), the collegiate church of Wolverhampton, Skipwith, St Peter's York, St Mary de Stanyngham, Byland Abbey, and the shrine of St Thomas at Canterbury Cathedral.

The will makes many individual bequests, and refers to his sister Agnes, and his half-brothers William and Robert and their mother Johanna, who according to their father's will are to hold and inherit his properties in York. Several London churches are remembered, including St Peter Westcheap and its chaplains. The will is particularly interesting for its mention of various books. He restores to Byland Abbey a book called Tabula iuris which was lent to him by the late Abbot Geoffrey; he asks William Bryght, rector of St Michael Cornhill, to forgive him for having failed to return his book of Gorham. To one he gives his best Bible and a book of sermons which a certain prior of St Bartholomew's wrote (a paper volume), and to another the book Speculum Curatorum which he has already lent to him. He has a book of Gorham's Super Matthaeum, and a copy of Bartholomeus' De Casibus Consciencie. He gives his great Missal, recently bought from John Boyse, to the church of Easington; restores to John White, chaplain there, a small missal he has lent him, and to Richard Kelsterne at Westcheap his volume of Vegetius. The circulation of these books has encouraged the suggestion that Hovyngham maintained friendships from his days at Oxford University.

The will was proved before Bishop Philip Repyngdon at the Old Temple, London on 15 December 1417.
