= William Boleyn (archdeacon) =

English Tudor clergy (1482-1552)

- Born: c. 1482
- Died: February 1552
- Occupation: archdeacon of Winchester
- Spouse: none
- Children: none
- Parent(s): Sir William Boleyn and Margaret Butler
- Relatives: Niece: Anne Boleyn, Queen of England

Academic background
- Education: Cambridge University

William Boleyn (died 1552) was an uncle to Anne Boleyn, Queen of England. He was a younger brother of Thomas Boleyn, 1st Earl of Wiltshire, Viscount Rochford, Anne Boleyn's father. He was born c. 1482. He was appointed archdeacon of Winchester in 1530 and continued in that post until his death in Stiffkey in Norfolk in February 1552.

== Education and early appointments ==
He was awarded his B.A. at Cambridge University in 1503-4 and his M.A. in 1507. He was a University preacher from 1512 until 1515. He was appointed a prebend of St. Paul's cathedral in 1516. At this time he was also appointed rector of St. Peter's, Cheap, London. In 1519, in addition, he accepted the appointment of rector of Eaglescliffe in County Durham.

== Advancements ==
In November 1529, one month after the fall of Cardinal Wolsey, William Boleyn was appointed prebend for Strensall in the arch-diocese of York, replacing Thomas Wynter, Wolsey's son.

That same month a Convocation was called and three men were summoned to represent Winchester; Henry Broke the Prior, William Basyng (later prior and eventually, as William Kingsmill, first Dean), and William Boleyn, despite having no office at Winchester. Richard Pates, the archdeacon since 1527, was not summoned.

In December 1529 he was appointed rector of Winwick in Lancashire following the resignation of the same Thomas Wynter. Both appointments, at Strensall and Winwick, were subject to Henry VIII's approval. Also, in December, George Boleyn, Anne Boleyn's brother and William Boleyn's nephew, was awarded an annuity of £200 a year "out of the lands of the bishopric of Winchester" by Henry VIII. Thomas Wolsey, though in disgrace was, at this time both Archbishop of York and bishop of Winchester.

Following his resignation from the appointments at Strensall and Winwick, Boleyn was installed as archdeacon of Winchester on 20 January 1530. He did not attend his installation.

== Archdeacon 1530 to 1552 and other benefices ==
From the time of his installation the cathedral registers are silent on the activities of William Boleyn. Even his death is unrecorded. Neither does his name appear in the few surviving Visitation Books for the period although a primary task of archdeacons was to visit, annually, every parish in the diocese, nor did he attend any of the Consistory Courts whose records are still in existence. The latter appear to have been presided over without fail by Edmunde Steward/Stuarde, bishop Stephen Gardiner's chancellor.

William Boleyn's annual income, as archdeacon, is recorded in the 1535 Valor Ecclesiasticus and in the amended version for 1536. In 1535 his Winchester income is shown as £97 15s 2d 'ob' ('ob' means a halfpenny). In 1536, after the execution of Anne Boleyn, his income has been reduced to £67 15s 2d 'ob'.

In May 1533, shortly before Anne Boleyn's coronation, Boleyn was awarded the valuable benefice of Moulton in Suffolk.

In 1534 Boleyn was appointed rector of Holt in Norfolk in exchange for Moulton and resigned from his rectorship in Eaglescliffe. Holt is fairly close to the seat of Thomas Howard, Duke of Norfolk, uncle of Anne Boleyn.

In August 1535 William Boleyn "released Mr Wynter from ... all actions for the parsonage at Wyntwick" and Thomas Wynter was paid £1000 by one Thomas Barton and one other. Barton was an important landowner in the Duchy of Lancaster at that time. This dispute appears, however, to have continued because in November 1537 Edward Keble, chaplain to Edward Seymour (brother of Queen Jane Seymour) made a claim against the parsonage and in February 1538 Boleyn was persuaded to leave.

Other benefices in Norfolk also came Boleyn's way. The county records show that he was rector of Aylsham from some unknown date until 1542 and in 1543 he was appointed rector of Postwick, close to Norwich. Previously, in 1540, he had been granted, by his brother James, an area of parkland near Hevingham just two miles from Aylsham. He also owned some land at Hever castle in Kent, the home of his brother Thomas.

== Death ==
He was buried at Stiffkey, Norfolk on 6 February 1552.
