= Poor Susan =

1797 poem by William Wordsworth

- by William Wordsworth
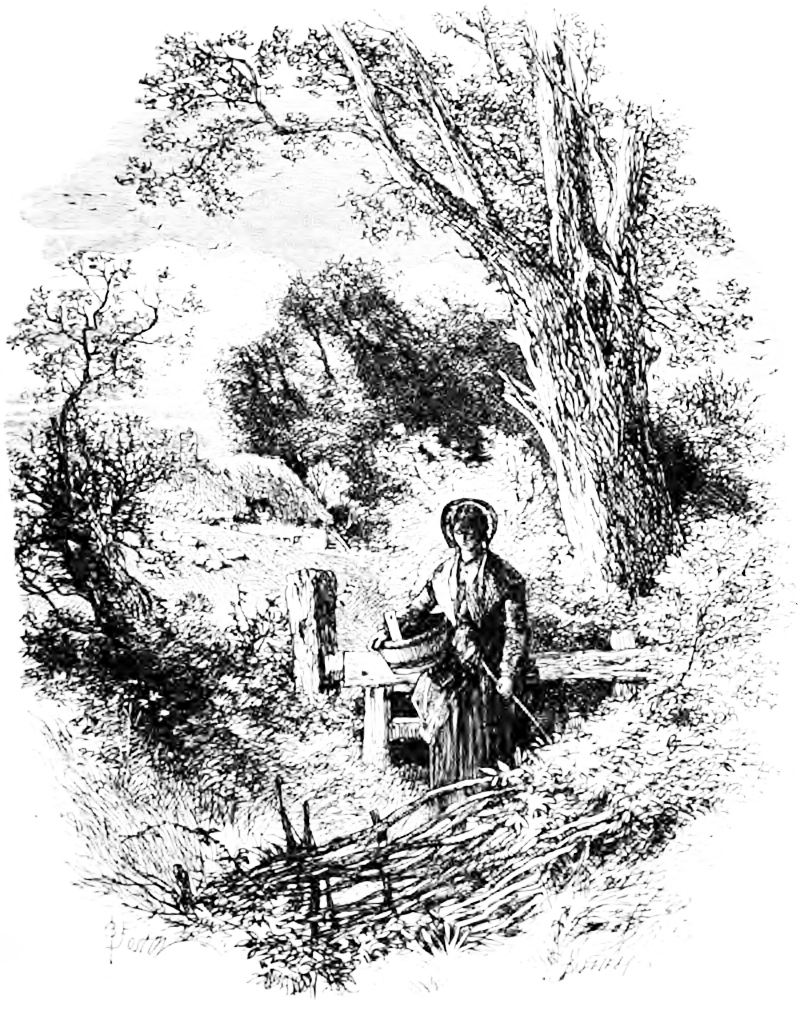
- Myles Birket Foster's illustration of "Poor Susan" from Beauties of English Landscape (1874), engraved by the brothers Dalziel
- First published in: 1798
- Meter: anapestic tetrameter

Full text
- Lyrical_Ballads_(1800)/Volume_2/Poor_Susan at Wikisource

"Poor Susan" is a lyric poem by William Wordsworth composed at Alfoxden in 1797. It was first published in the second edition of Lyrical Ballads (1800). It is written in anapestic tetrameter.

The poem records the memories awakening in a country girl in London on hearing a thrush sing in the early morning.

== Text ==
At the corner of Wood-Street, when day-light appears,
There's a Thrush that sings loud, it has sung for three years.
Poor Susan has pass'd by the spot and has heard
In the silence of morning the song of the bird.

'Tis a note of enchantment; what ails her? She sees
A mountain ascending, a vision of trees;
Bright volumes of vapour through Lothbury glide,
And a river flows on through the vale of Cheapside.

Green pastures she views in the midst of the dale,
Down which she so often has tripp'd with her pail,
And a single small cottage, a nest like a dove's,
The only one dwelling on earth that she loves.

She looks, and her heart is in Heaven, but they fade,
The mist and the river, the hill and the shade;
The stream will not flow, and the hill will not rise,
And the colours have all pass'd away from her eyes.

Poor Outcast! return—to receive thee once more
The house of thy Father will open its door,
And thou once again, in thy plain russet gown,
Mayst hear the thrush sing from a tree of its own.

== History ==
In Wordsworth's Preface to the Lyrical Ballads, the poet states:

I have said that each of these poems has a purpose. I have also informed my Reader what this purpose will be found principally to be: namely to illustrate the manner in which our feelings and ideas are associated in a state of excitement. But speaking in less general language, it is to follow the fluxes and refluxes of the mind when agitated by the great and simple affections of our nature. The feeling therein developed gives importance to the action and situation and not the action and situation to the feeling. My meaning will be rendered perfectly intelligible by referring my Reader to the Poems entitled POOR SUSAN and the CHILDLESS FATHER ...

Charles Lamb objected to the final stanza:

[It throws] a kind of dubiety on Susan's moral conduct. Susan is a servant maid. I see her trundling her mop and contemplating the whirling phenomenon thro’ blurred optics; but to term her a poor outcast seems as much as to say that poor Susan was no better than she should be, which I trust was not what you meant to express.

According to Ernest de Sélincourt, Wordsworth responded by deleting the stanza in the 1815 edition of his poems and renaming the poem The Reverie of Poor Susan, a title which may have been influenced by his reading Bürger's Des Arme Suschens Traum at Goslar. In addition he replaced the word There's at the beginning of the second line by Hangs and added an introductory note:

This arose out of my observation of the affecting music of these birds hanging in this way in the London streets during the freshness and stillness of the Spring morning.

However, Peter J. Manning pointed out that:

[The] stanza was omitted as early as the 1802 reprinting of the Lyrical Ballads, long before Lamb's comments, just quoted, which occur in a letter of 1815 responding to Wordsworth's present of the just-published two-volume edition of his works. Lamb may have been pleased to see that criticism made years before had been taken up, but his responsibility for the revision remains undetermined.

== Bibliography ==
- Davies, Hunter. William Wordsworth, Weidenfeld and Nicolson 1980
- Gill, Stephen. William Wordsworth: A Life, Oxford University Press 1989
- Moorman, Mary. William Wordsworth, A Biography: The Early Years, 1770-1803 v. 1, Oxford University Press 1957
- Moorman, Mary. William Wordsworth: A Biography: The Later Years, 1803-50 v. 2, Oxford University Press 1965
