= Lumley baronets =

Extinct baronetcy in the Baronetage of England

The Lumley Baronetcy, of Bardfield Magna in the County of Essex, was a title in the Baronetage of England. It was created on 8 January 1641 for Martin Lumley, Member of Parliament for Essex. He was the son of Sir Martin Lumley, Lord Mayor of London from 1623 to 1624. The title became extinct on the death of the fourth Baronet in 1771.

== Lumley baronets, of Bardfield Magna (1641) ==
- Sir Martin Lumley, 1st Baronet (c. 1596-c. 1651)
- Sir Martin Lumley, 2nd Baronet (c. 1628–1702)
- Sir Martin Lumley, 3rd Baronet (1662–1711)
- Sir James Lumley, 4th Baronet (c. 1697–1771)
