= Richard Lumley =

Richard Lumley may refer to:

- Richard Lumley, 1st Viscount Lumley (1589–1663), English royalist and military commander
- Richard Lumley, 1st Earl of Scarbrough (1650–1721), English soldier and statesman
- Richard Lumley, 2nd Earl of Scarbrough (1686–1740), British Whig politician
- Richard Lumley, 9th Earl of Scarbrough (1813–1884), Anglo-Irish peer and soldier
- Richard Lumley, 12th Earl of Scarbrough (1932–2004), English nobleman
- Richard Lumley, 13th Earl of Scarbrough (born 1973), British peer

== See also ==
- Richard Lumley-Saunderson (disambiguation)
