= Lumley-Saunderson =

Lumley-Saunderson is a compound surname borne by:

- Frances Lumley-Saunderson, Countess of Scarbrough (c. 1700–1772), British courtier
- George Lumley-Saunderson, 5th Earl of Scarbrough (1753–1807), British politician
- Richard Lumley-Saunderson, 4th Earl of Scarbrough (1725–1782)
- Richard Lumley-Saunderson, 6th Earl of Scarbrough (1757–1832), British politician
- Thomas Lumley-Saunderson, 3rd Earl of Scarbrough (c.1691–1752), British Army officer and diplomat
