= Scott Lumley =

American business man and convicted fraudster

Scott Lumley is an American business man.

== Business endeavors ==
Lumley started researching liquidation sales and returns. He eventually turned a $250 pallet of products bought from overseas and flipped them into $4800 over several weeks. Lumley founded Resolve Commercial in 2010 which developed large residential developments in the Middle Tennessee area.

== Legal issues ==
In 2015, Lumley pleaded guilty to wire fraud and money laundering. Lumley admitted that as the owner of Bluebuyou; a wholesale distributor, he had made misrepresentations to a customer to which he had sold $200,000 of energy drinks. He admitted that he had forged the bills of lading and that the drinks had never been shipped and that the company did not have enough product to satisfy the sale. He was sentenced later that year and agreed to pay full restitution to the customer.

In 2022, Lumley was indicted for allegedly defrauding a company of $550,000 over an order of graphics cards that were not delivered. Lumley fled to Morocco in 2020 and was extradited to the US. He pleaded guilty to the charges in July 2024 along with other charges related to making false financial statements to banks in order to obtain loans and various tax-related charges. He was sentenced to 47 months in prison and ordered to pay restitution of $1.2m.
