= Pedro Castellanos =

Mexican priest and architect (1902–1961)

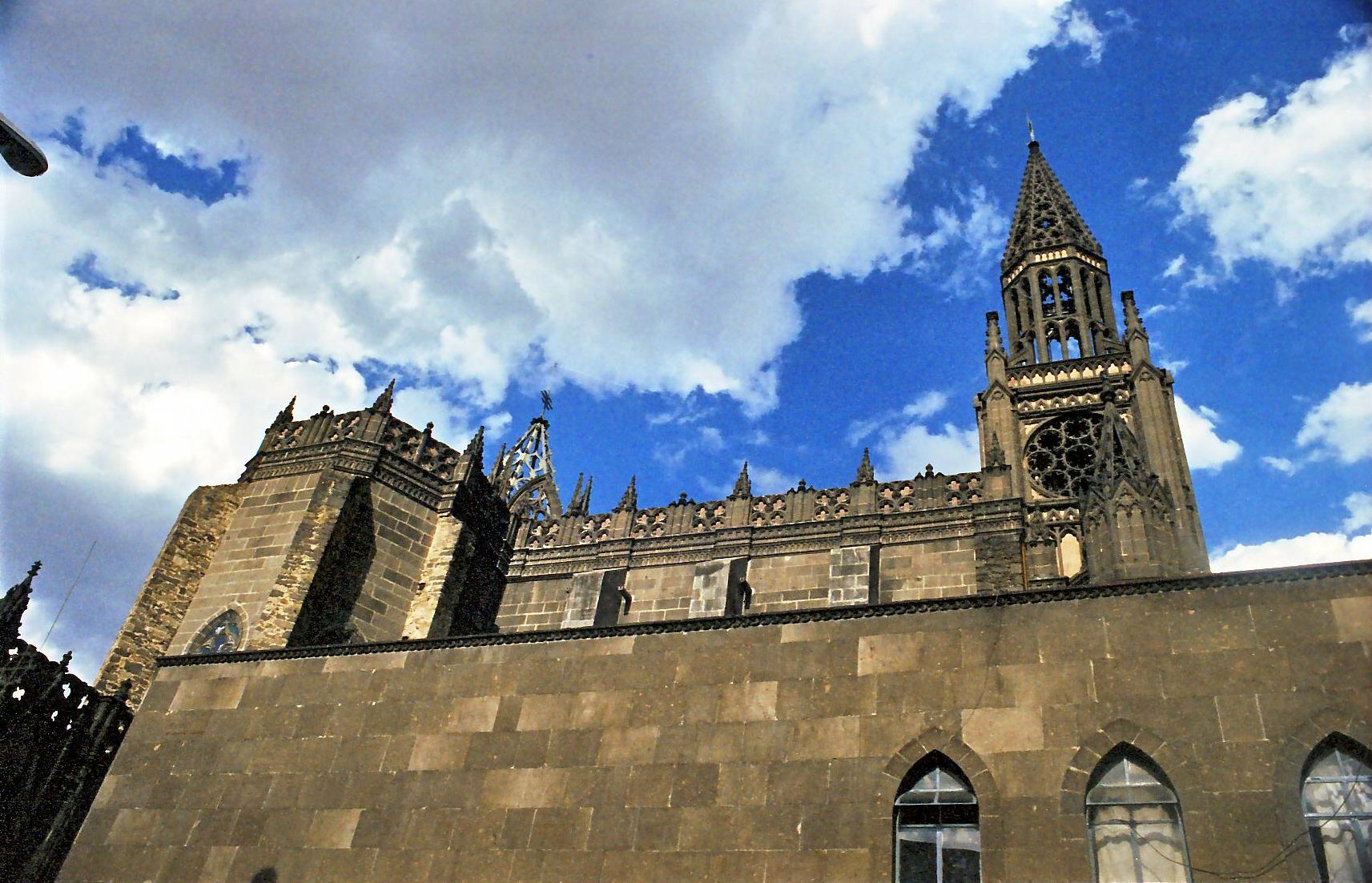
- Born: Pedro Castellanos Lambley; 1902; Guadalajara, Jalisco, Mexico
- Died: 1961 (aged 58–59); Guadalajara, Jalisco, Mexico
- Occupations: Architect, priest
- Notable work: Rébora family home, Aranguren family home, San Juan de Dios Market
- Movement: Tapatia School of Architecture

Pedro Castellanos Lambley (1902–1961) was a Mexican priest and architect, who gained renown in the state of Jalisco during a time of early Modernism marked by sacred purity. He is best known for designing the homes of the Rébora and Aranguren families in Guadalajara.

== Early life ==
He was born in 1902 in Guadalajara, to a family that excelled in literature and politics. His grandmother was poet Esther Tapia de Castellanos, and his father was Luis Castellanos y Tapia, governor of the state of Jalisco.

After a basic education in the UK and attendance at a military school in the United States, Castellanos returned to Guadalajara and studied at Ambrosio Ulloa's Engineering School, obtaining a degree in engineering and architecture in 1924. His first job was collaboration with Arnulfo Villaseñor in the construction of the José Guadalupe Zuno house (at the intersection of Bosque and Union).

By 1925 he was already a lead designer at the office of Juan José Barragán, a prominent builder of the time (he replaced Luis Barragán, who had left to open shop on his own). Around 1931, Pedro Castellanos founded Castellanos and Negrete, leading to a series of brilliant solutions to professional commissions.

== Career ==
Castellanos was known for his talent and versatility, as well as a clever eclecticism. Together with his classmates Luis Barragán, Ignacio Díaz Morales, and Rafael Urzúa they established the Tapatia School of Architecture movement (1928–1936), and Castellanos became known as a proponent of 'traditional modernity' (a return to traditional values while also acknowledging contemporaneity). According to Julio de la Peña, Castellanos was "a precursor of contemporary architecture, the most authentic, with a very vivacious architecture, yet without losing a certain simplicity".

While developing in the field of architecture, Castellanos continued his religious vocation, joining the convent of Franciscan friars in Aguascalientes, in 1938. Two years later he returned to Guadalajara, ordained a priest, and in the 1940s he headed the Diocese Commission on the Arts. He built a series of religious buildings around the state, including the Parroquia de Nuestra Señora del Rosario (Guadalajara), the Main Seminary, the chapel at Ciudad Granja, and the churches of Solitude, Holy Cross, and the Sacred Heart, as well as others in small towns.

Two of his best known and appreciated works are: the house of the Rébora family (2052 Lerdo de Tejada; built in 1934), and the Aranguren residence, also in Guadalajara. In general, one must also highlight his residential compounds, which combine the local tradition of the patio, while allotting great individuality to each unit. The old market of San Juan de Dios (no longer in existence) is also one of his works.

At his death in 1961, the College of Architects honored him with a post-mortem honoris causa distinction, for a life devoted to the production of architecture.

== Sources ==
- Pedro Castellanos in Volume 11 of Monografías de arquitectos del siglo XX. Gobierno de Jalisco, Secretaría de Cultura, 2006 ISBN 9706245170
