= Lambley (surname) =

Lambley is a surname, and may refer to:

- Matthew Lambley (born 1987), British hammer thrower and coach
- Peter Lambley (1946–2022), British biologist and lichenologist
- Robyn Lambley (born 1965), Australian politician

== See also ==
- Lumley (surname)
