= Governor Lumley =

Governor Lumley may refer to:

- Roger Lumley, 11th Earl of Scarbrough (1896–1969), Governor of Bombay from 1937 to 1943
- William Lumley (1769–1850), Governor of Bermuda from 1819 to 1822 and from 1823 to 1825
