= Sir Martin Lumley, 1st Baronet =

English politician

Sir Martin Lumley, 1st Baronet (c. 1596 – c. 1651) was an English politician who sat in the House of Commons from 1641 to 1648. He supported the Parliamentary cause in the English Civil War.

Martin was the son of Sir Martin Lumley, Lord Mayor of London and his first wife Mary Witham, daughter of Robert Witham of Yorkshire. He succeeded to his father's estate of Great Bardfield, Essex in 1634 and was High Sheriff of Essex from 1639 to 1640. He was created baronet on 8 January 1641 and knighted at Whitehall on the following day.

In 1641, Lumley was elected member of parliament for Essex in the Long Parliament. He was a Presbyterian and supported the Parliamentary cause, serving on many committees between 1643 and 1646. He was secluded in 1648 under Pride's Purge.

Lumley died in about 1651 in which year his will was proved.

Lumley married firstly Jane Meredith, daughter of John Meredith of Denbighshire at St Andrew's Undrshaft on 16 January 1621. She died sometime after 1624 and he married secondly Mary Allen daughter of Edward Allen of Finchley, sometime Sheriff of London, at St Andrew's on 29 May 1627. He was succeeded in the baronetcy by his son Martin by his second wife.

Parliament of England
Preceded by Lord Rich; Sir William Masham	Member of Parliament for Essex; 1641–1648; With: Sir William Masham	Succeeded by Sir William Masham
Baronetage of England
New creation	Baronet (of Bradfield Magna); 1641–c. 1651	Succeeded by Martin Lumley
