= Savile Lumley =

English illustrator and poster designer

- Born: 1876; Marylebone, London
- Died: 1960 (aged 83–84)
- Known for: Illustration

John Savile Lumley (1876–1960) was an English book illustrator and poster designer best known for his 1915 war recruitment poster Daddy, what did you do in the Great War?

== Life ==
Lumley was born in Marylebone, London in 1876 and attended the Royal Academy of Arts from 25 July 1893 to July 1898.

During the First World War, Lumley was approached by printer Arthur Gunn with an idea for a new army recruitment poster, the now well known Daddy, what did you do in the Great War? According to Gunn's son Lumley worked on a sketch of the idea before presenting the idea to the proposal to the British Parliamentary Recruiting Committee who subsequently commissioned it in 1915.

== Works ==
=== Books illustrated ===
- Run Away Nursery Tales (n.d.)
- Warne's Pleasure Book For Girls by W.J. Gordon (n.d.)
- In the Clutch of the Green Hand by Frances Cowen (n.d.)
- A School Libel by George Garner (n.d.)
- The Big Book for Girls by Mrs Herbert Strang (n.d.)
- Sunken Treasure by Percy Woodcock (n.d.)
- Gainst the Might of Spain: A Story of the Days of the Great Armada by Percy F. Westerman (n.d.)
- The Farm by Martin Merrythought (n.d.)
- The Joyous Adventures of Little Kumalo: A South African Story by Emiline Hale (n.d.)
- The Brownie Village by H.B. Davidson (n.d.)
- A Gipsy Brownie by H.B. Davidson (n.d.)
- Jerry and Joan by H.B. Davidson (n.d.)
- The Enormous Turnip retold by Vera Southgate (n.d.)
- A Handful Of Rebels by Raymond Jacberns (n.d.)
- The Merry Men of Sherwood by Willson Wingrove (n.d.)
- Five Years On A Training Ship by J.D. Bush and E.T. Miller (n.d.)
- Poppy and Peter in the White Ship by J. Finch (n.d.)
- Sea Slang: A Dictionary of the Old-Timers' Expressions and Epithets by Frank C. Bowen (n.d.)
- The Castle of Great Ideas by Jean Morton and K. Laverty (n.d.)
- The Country Cousin by C.A. Mercer (1905)
- The Deerslayer by James Fenimore Cooper (1910)
- A Disputed Heritage (1911)
- The Nursery ABC Book (1914)
- The Young Crofters by Mrs. Albert G. Latham (1920)
- All About Pets by Lillian Gask (1921)
- Angela Goes to School by May Wynne (1922)
- The Story of a Chinese Scout (1922)
- By Canoe to Cannibal-Land by J.H. Holmes (1923)
- Lorna Doone by Richard Blackmore (1923)
- Winifred Avon: A School Story for Girls by Mabel Marlowe (1923)
- The Captain and the King: A Public School Story by R.A.H. Goodyear (1923)
- The Channel Pirate by Lawrence Bourne (1924)
- Battle Royal School by R.A.H. Goodyear (1924)
- The Sisters of the Silver Sands by Evelyn Everett-Green (1924)
- The Bairn's Toy Book (1924)
- Brer Rabbit Stories (1925)
- A Prairie Schoolgirl by Alys Chatwin (1925)
- Peggy's School Pack by H.B. Davidson (1925)
- Chappie and Others by Constance Heward (1926)
- The Old Oak Chest by Dorothy MacNulty (1926)
- The Creaking Bough by Winifred Pares (1927)
- Mystery Island by Percy F. Westerman (1927)
- Coppernob Buckland by Lawrence Bourne (1927)
- Scouts In Buckskin by Wingrove Willson (1927)
- Little Pets' Story Book (1928)
- The Secret Station by Ellersley Hall (1929)
- Captain Coppernob: The Story of a Sailing Voyage by Lawrence Bourne (1929)
- The Magic Submarine by Ernest H. Robinson (1930)
- In Smugglers' Grip by Frank Calthorp et al (1930)
- Behind the Mountains by Wray Hunt (1930)
- In Pirate Waters by George Garner (1930)
- Two Years Before the Mast R.H. Dana (1930)
- Three Real Bricks by J.E. Grattan-Smith (1932)
- From a Cottage in Pennycook Lane by Isabel Cameron (1933)
- The Little Captives by D. Alcock (1933)
- The City of the Sorcerer by Major Charles Gilson (1934)
- Jerry Goes to Sea by Captain K. MacLure (1935)
- Wonder Tales of Past History by Robert Finch (1935)
- Wonder Tales of Great Explorers by Robert Finch (1935)
- Francis Drake - The Sea-King of Devon by George M. Towle (1935)
- The Jubilee Book for Children: To Commemorate 25 Years Glorious Reign (1935)
- Miss Greyshott's Girls by Evelyn Everett-Green (1935)
- Tibby of the Orange Funnel Line: The Adventures of a Ship's Kitten by Kaye Fox (1935)
- Holiday at Greystones by P.D. Logan (1936)
- Gullivers Travels by Jonathan Swift (1936)
- The Well of Nonsense by Jean Moreton (1938)
- A Term to Remember by May Wynne (1939)
- Charley Laurel and Another Story by William H.G. Kingston and Isabel S. Robson (1940)
- Robinson Crusoe by Daniel Defoe (1940)
- Winged Venturers by Guy Dempster (1942)
- Mister Bannock: A Nonsense Story by Edgar Primrose Dickie (1947)
- The Pathfinder by James Fenimore Cooper (1949)
- The Black Arrow by R.L. Stevenson (1949)
- The Pilgrim's Progress by John Bunyan (1950)
- The Young Fur-Traders by R.M. Ballantyne (1950)
- Nancy Afloat by Bessie Marchant (1952)
- Westward in the Mermaid by Percy Woodcock (1956)
- Adventure Down Channel by Percy Woodcock (1957)
- Sunken Treasure by Percy Woodcock (1957)
- Sea Wrack by Percy Woodcock (1958)
- Fog in the Channel by Percy Woodcock (1958)
- The Impossible Prefect by Hubert Robinson (1960)

=== Posters ===
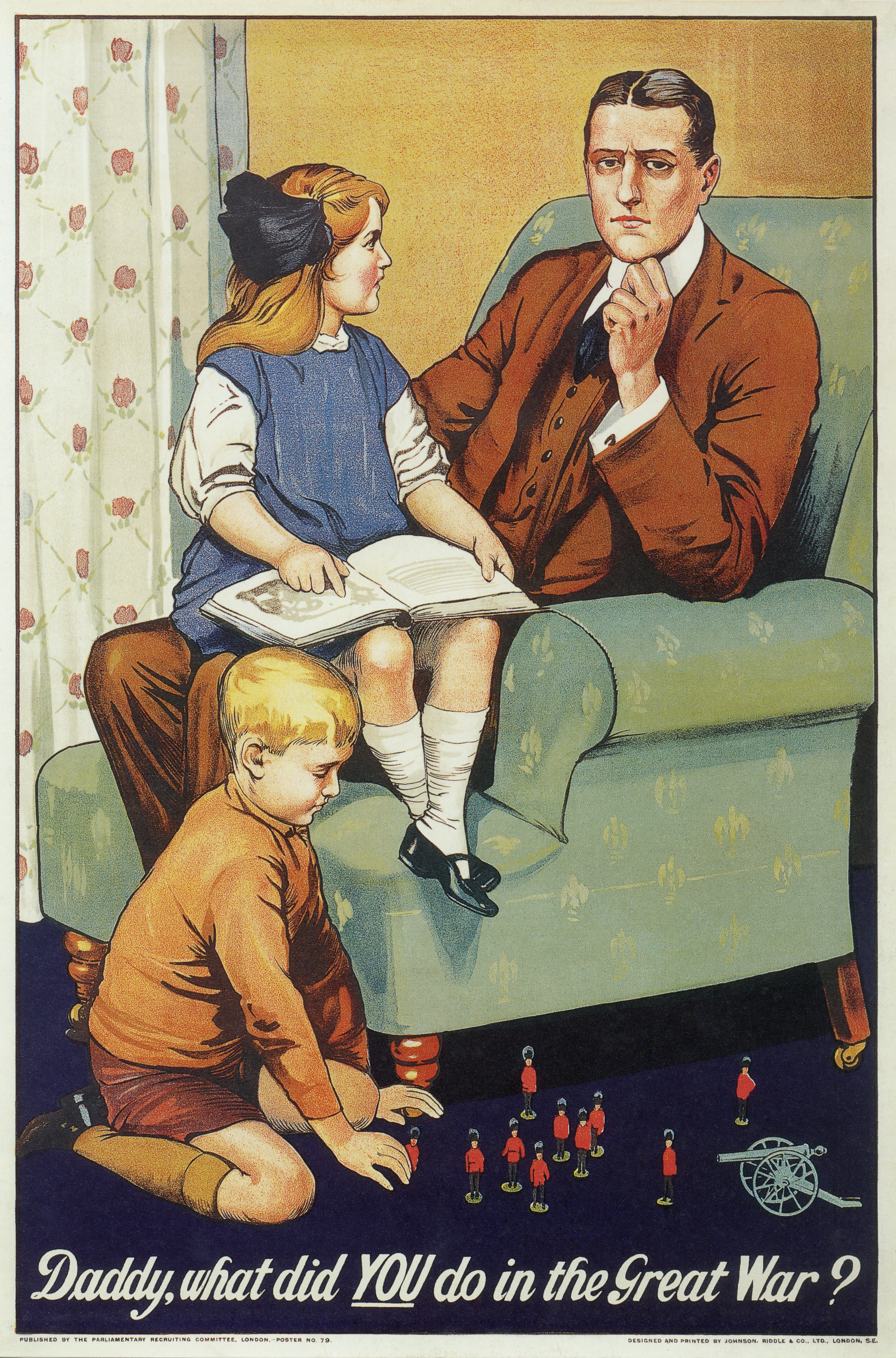
Lumley's poster for the Parliamentary Recruiting Committee in March 1915, Daddy, what did YOU do in the Great War?

- Daddy, what did YOU do in the Great War?

=== Annuals ===
- Hutchinson's Girls' Annual (n.d.)
- Happy Times. Warne's Wearproof Books (n.d.)
- Partridge's Children's Annual - 5th Year by Dorothea Moore et al (1913)
- The Kiddies' Annual (1920)
- The Kiddies' Annual (1923)
- Chatterbox 1923 by J. Erskine Clarke (1923)
- The School Friend Annual (1928)
- The Schoolgirls' Own Annual (1928)
- The Golden Annual for Girls (1928)
- The Schoolgirls' Own Annual (1929)
- Pip and Squeak Annual 1929 (1929)
- The Boys Budget (1933)
- Pip and Squeak Annual 1934 (1934)
- The Greyfriars Holiday Annual for Boys and Girls by Frank Richards et al (1936)
- The Boys Budget (1938)
- Chums Annual (1939)
- The Boy's Own Paper
- The Champion Annual
- Chatterbox and Little Folks
