= James Rutherford Lumley =

British soldier

Major-General Sir James Rutherford Lumley KCB (21 October 1773 – February 1846) was an English soldier of the Bengal Army in British India.

A son of the Reverend James Lumley and his wife Alice Rutherford, he was baptised on 22 December 1773 at Longford, near Newport, Shropshire.

Lumley was commissioned into the Honourable East India Company’s Bengal Infantry and by 1824 was a lieutenant-colonel. In January 1837 he was promoted to Major-General. He was adjutant general of the Bengal army which defeated the Mahrattas in 1844 and soon after that was appointed a Knight Commander of the Order of the Bath for his services. He died in 1846.

On 21 November 1809, at Calcutta, Lumley married Caroline Wilkinson. Their children included Anne Lumley (died 1859), James Rutherford Lumley (1810–1885), William Brownrigg Lumley (born 1812), Caroline Lumley (born 1816), Arabella Lumley (born 1817) and Robert Wilkinson Lumley (born 1819). In 1873, William Brownrigg Lumley was a retired Captain of the Indian Army.

The actress Joanna Lumley is his direct descendant.
