= Thomas Lumley, 2nd Baron Lumley =

English nobleman, soldier and favourite of King Edward IV

Thomas Lumley, 2nd Baron Lumley (29 September 1408–1 April 1485) was an English nobleman, soldier, and favourite of King Edward IV. Depending on the source, he may be referred to as either the 1st Baron Lumley (of the second creation) or the 2nd Baron Lumley (of the first creation).

== Family background ==
Lumley was born at Morpeth in Northumberland in 1408 on Michaelmas. His grandfather, Ralph Lumley, was created the first Baron Lumley by King Richard II, but was attainted and executed by order of Henry IV for his role in the Epiphany Rising. The first baron's wife, Eleanor Neville, was the sister of Ralph Neville, 1st Earl of Westmorland. Lumley's father, John, was restored to his family's possessions but not to the peerage. His mother, Felicia Redmayne, was the daughter of Sir Matthew Redmayne, governor of Roxburgh and Berwick.

== Career ==
Lumley had a long and distinguished career, which included service under kings from both the House of Lancaster and the House of York. In 1434, he was placed in command of a force of nineteen men-at-arms and one hundred twenty archers for service abroad. On multiple occasions between 1449 and 1461, he was one of the king's guarantees in treaty negotiations with Scotland, and his loyal service was rewarded in 1455 with a life appointment as governor of Scarborough Castle.

His long service to Henry VI notwithstanding, Lumley was a strong supporter of Edward IV upon the latter's accession to the throne in 1461. Lumley was a close relation to the king (through the Neville family), and when Lumley petitioned for a reversal of his grandfather's attainer, he was raised to the peerage as the second Baron Lumley. He was summoned to parliament as Baron Lumley on 26 July 1461. He seems to have been a highly valued member of Edward IV's court; he was sent in 1465 to attempt (unsuccessfully, in this case) to persuade the King of Scots to marry a person from Edward's circle.

== Marriage and children ==
Lumley married Margaret Harington, daughter of Sir James Harington, Constable of Liverpool Castle. They had a son, George, who would succeed to the title, and three daughters. One of his grandchildren, Thomas Lumley, would later marry a natural daughter of his benefactor, Edward IV.

Peerage of England
| Preceded by Ralph Lumley, 1st Baron Lumley; Forfeit 1401 until 1461 | Baron Lumley; 1461–1485 | Succeeded by George Lumley, 3rd Baron Lumley |
