= Ralph Lumley, 1st Baron Lumley =

English nobleman, soldier and administrator (c. 1360 – 1400)

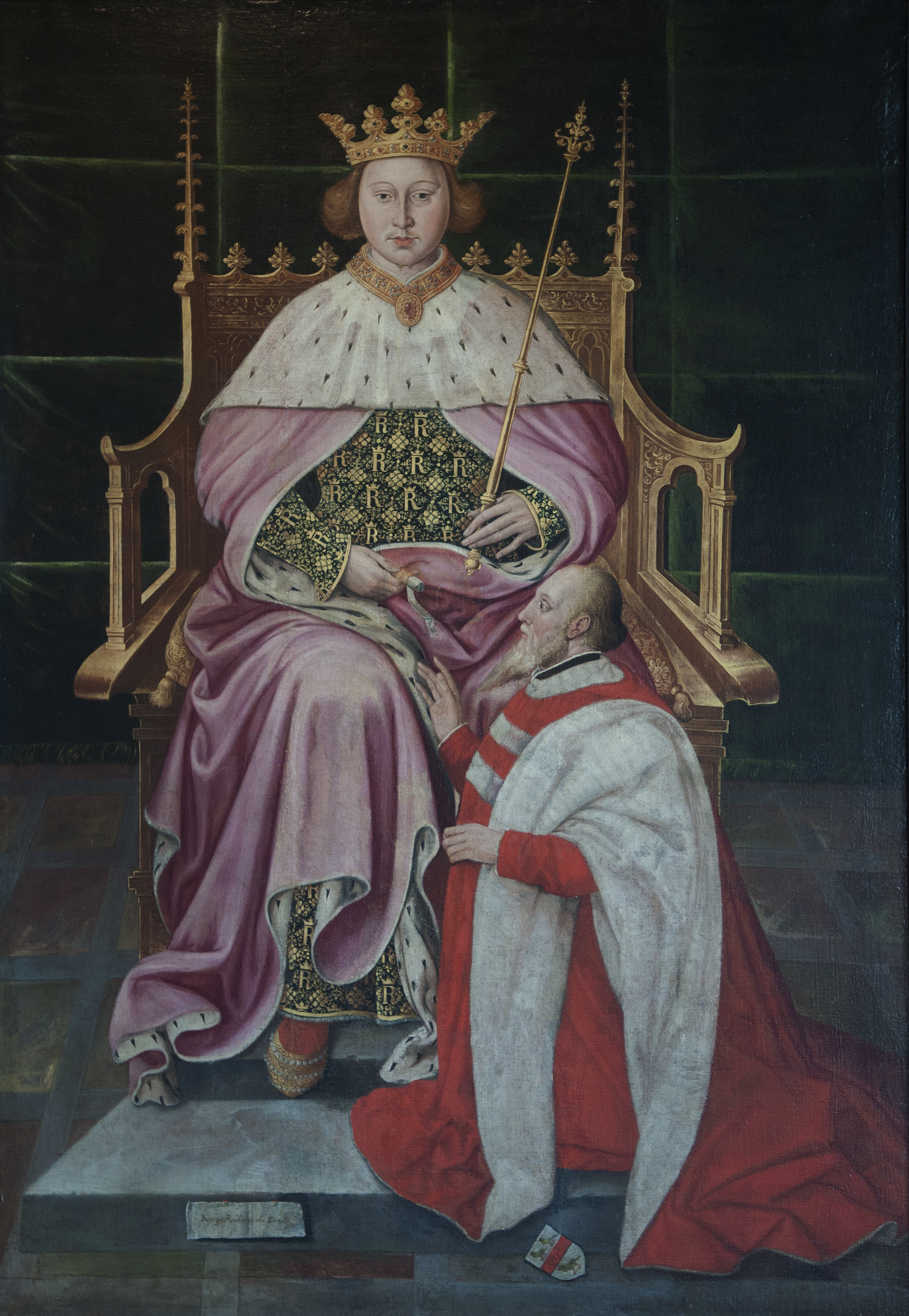
Painting in Leeds Castle of King Richard II and Ralph Lumley

Ralph Lumley, 1st Baron Lumley (c. 1360 – January 1400) was an English nobleman, soldier and administrator under King Richard II, who was stripped of his lands, goods and title and executed for rebelling against King Henry IV.

== Origins ==
Born about 1360, he was the second son and heir of Sir Marmaduke Lumley (1314–1365), a landowner and administrator in Northumberland, and his second wife Margaret, daughter of Robert Holland, 2nd Baron Holand.

== Career ==
Under the age of majority at the death of his father in 1365 and of his elder brother Robert in 1374, his guardian was John Neville. In 1383 he received his inherited lands and had already embarked on a military career, being knighted and holding for ransom a number of French prisoners of war. The next year he was summoned to Parliament as a baron and in 1385 was under the command of Henry Percy, 1st Earl of Northumberland, fighting the Scots in the defence of Berwick-upon-Tweed. At the Battle of Otterburn in August 1388, he was taken prisoner by the Scots, not being freed until October 1389 after payment of a sizeable ransom, toward which both King Richard and the Bishop of Durham contributed.

In 1391 he was appointed Captain of Berwick and in 1392 received royal permission to rebuild and crenellate his castle at Lumley. In 1394 and 1397 he was on the commission of the peace for the North Riding of Yorkshire and in 1397 attended the Parliament at which all members had to swear loyalty to King Richard.

In the Parliament of September 1399 he accepted the seizure of power by King Henry IV and the imprisonment of Richard, but in December joined his cousin Thomas Holland, 1st Duke of Surrey, in the conspiracy known as the Epiphany Rising, which aimed to murder Henry and restore Richard. He was one of the conspirators captured and beheaded at Cirencester in January 1400. All his moveable possessions were given to the king's half-brother John Beaufort, 1st Earl of Somerset, and his estates were forfeited to the crown, apart from lands yielding 100 pounds a year left to support his widow and twelve children.

== Family ==
He married Eleanor (died after 1441), third daughter of his guardian John Neville and his first wife Maud, daughter of Henry Percy, 2nd Baron Percy. Their children included:

- Thomas (died 1400), implicated in his father's treason.
- Sir John (1383–1421), whose son Sir Thomas obtained a reversal of his grandfather's attainder in 1461.
- Marmaduke (died 1450), Cambridge-educated bishop and Lord High Treasurer of England (1446–1449).
- Catherine (died 1461), who before 1425 married Sir John Chideock, of Chideock in Dorset.
- Elizabeth, who married Adam Tyrwhitt, of Kettleby in Lincolnshire.

Peerage of England
New title	Baron Lumley; 1384–1401	Forfeit restored 1461 to Thomas Lumley
