= Thomas Lumley (statistician) =

Statistician

- Born: 1969 (age 56–57)
- Citizenship: Australian
- Education: Monash University (BSc); University of Oxford (MSc); University of Washington (PhD)
- Known for: R Core Team member Survey sampling survey package for R
- Awards: Fellow of the American Statistical Association (2012); Fellow of the Royal Society of New Zealand (2015); Gertrude Cox Award (2008)
- Scientific career
- Fields: Biostatistics, Statistical computing
- Workplaces: University of Auckland; University of Washington
- Doctoral advisor: Patrick James Heagerty
- Doctoral students: 9
- Website: faculty.washington.edu/tlumley/

Thomas Lumley is an Australian statistician who serves as the chair of biostatistics at the University of Auckland in New Zealand. Lumley is also a member of the "R Core Team."

He was elected as a fellow of the ASA (American Statistical Association) in 2012. Lumley was also elected a fellow of the Royal Society of New Zealand in 2015.

== Education ==
Lumley received his Bachelors of Science at Monash University in Melbourne, Australia in 1991, a Masters of Science in Applied Statistics at the University of Oxford in Oxford, United Kingdom in 1993, and his Ph.D. in Biostatistics at the University of Washington in Seattle, Washington in 1998.

== Work ==
Lumley is a professor of statistics at the University of Auckland where he researches regression modelling, clinical trials, semiparametric inference, statistical computing, foundations, and genomics. His statistics publications are commonly cited in the statistics and biostatistics fields. He makes contributions to R as a member of the R Core Team and contributes to the StatsChat blog.

== Awards ==
- Howard Hughes Medical Institute Predoctoral Fellowship from 1995 to 1998
- Donovan J Thompson Award for Academic Excellence in Biostatistics in 1996
- Best Oral Presentation at Biometric Society Student Paper Competition in 1997
- Gertrude Cox Award for contributions to Statistical Practice in 2008
- Elected as an ASA Fellow in 2012
- Elected as a fellow of the Royal Society of New Zealand in 2015

== Notable works ==
Some of Lumley's notable publications from 2019 include:

- Estimating prediction error for complex samples
- Numerical evaluation of methods approximating the distribution of a large quadratic form in normal variables
- Fast Generalized Linear Models by Database Sampling and One-Step Polishing
