= Baron Lumley =

Barony in the Peerage of England

There have been four creations of the title Baron Lumley, all in the Peerage of England:

The first creation was in 1384 for Sir Ralph Lumley but after being beheaded by the citizens of Cirencester for his part in the Epiphany Rising, he was posthumously attainted and his title forfeit.

The next creation was in 1461 for the grandson of the first baron, Sir Thomas Lumley in 1461. Shortly after, he obtained a reversal of his grandfather's attainder and presumably became the 2nd Baron Lumley of the 1384 creation also. Upon the death of the 5th/4th baron in 1545, the title was forfeit due to the opposition of his son, George, to the Dissolution of the Monasteries.

The third creation was in 1547 for George's son, Sir John, who managed to be restored in the blood, but the title became extinct upon his death without children in 1609.

The final creation was in 1681 for Richard Lumley, 2nd Viscount Lumley (a cousin of the last baron) who was later created Earl of Scarbrough in 1690. The barony and earldom have remained united to the present day.

== Barons Lumley (1384) ==
- Ralph Lumley, 1st Baron Lumley (c. 1360–1400), attainted

== Barons Lumley (1461) ==
- Thomas Lumley, 1st Baron Lumley (1408–1485)
- George Lumley, 2nd Baron Lumley (c. 1445–1507)
- Richard Lumley, 3rd Baron Lumley (c. 1477–1510)
- John Lumley, 4th Baron Lumley (c. 1492–1545), forfeit

== Barons Lumley (1547) ==
- John Lumley, 1st Baron Lumley (c. 1533–1609), title extinct
  - Jane Lumley, Baroness Lumley (1537–1578), wife of the above, first person to translate Euripides into English

== Barons Lumley (1681) ==
- Richard Lumley, 2nd Viscount Lumley, 1st Baron Lumley (c. 1650–1721), later created Earl of Scarbrough
