= Martin Lumley (lord mayor) =

English merchant

Sir Martin Lumley (died 2 July 1634) was an English merchant who was Lord Mayor of London in 1623.

Lumley was a grandson of a Genoese, who settled in England in the time of King Henry VIII. He was a city of London merchant and a member of the Worshipful Company of Drapers. On 15 September 1614 he was elected an alderman of the City of London for Vintry ward. He was Sheriff of London for the years 1614 to 1615 and was Master of the Drapers Company from 1615 to 1616. In 1623, he was elected Lord Mayor of London. He was also Master of the Drapers Company for another year in 1623. He was knighted on 23 May 1624. In 1626 he became alderman for Bread Street ward. He was president of Christ's Hospital from 1632 to 1634. According to some accounts, he was buried at St Peter, Westcheap. Other accounts record his burial at St Helen's Bishopsgate.

Lumley was the father of Sir Martin Lumley, 1st Baronet.

Civic offices
Preceded by Peter Probie	Lord Mayor of the City of London; 1623	Succeeded by John Gore
