= Charlotte Cavendish, Marchioness of Hartington =

British noble (1731–1754)

The Right Honourable Marchioness of Hartington and The Baroness Clifford
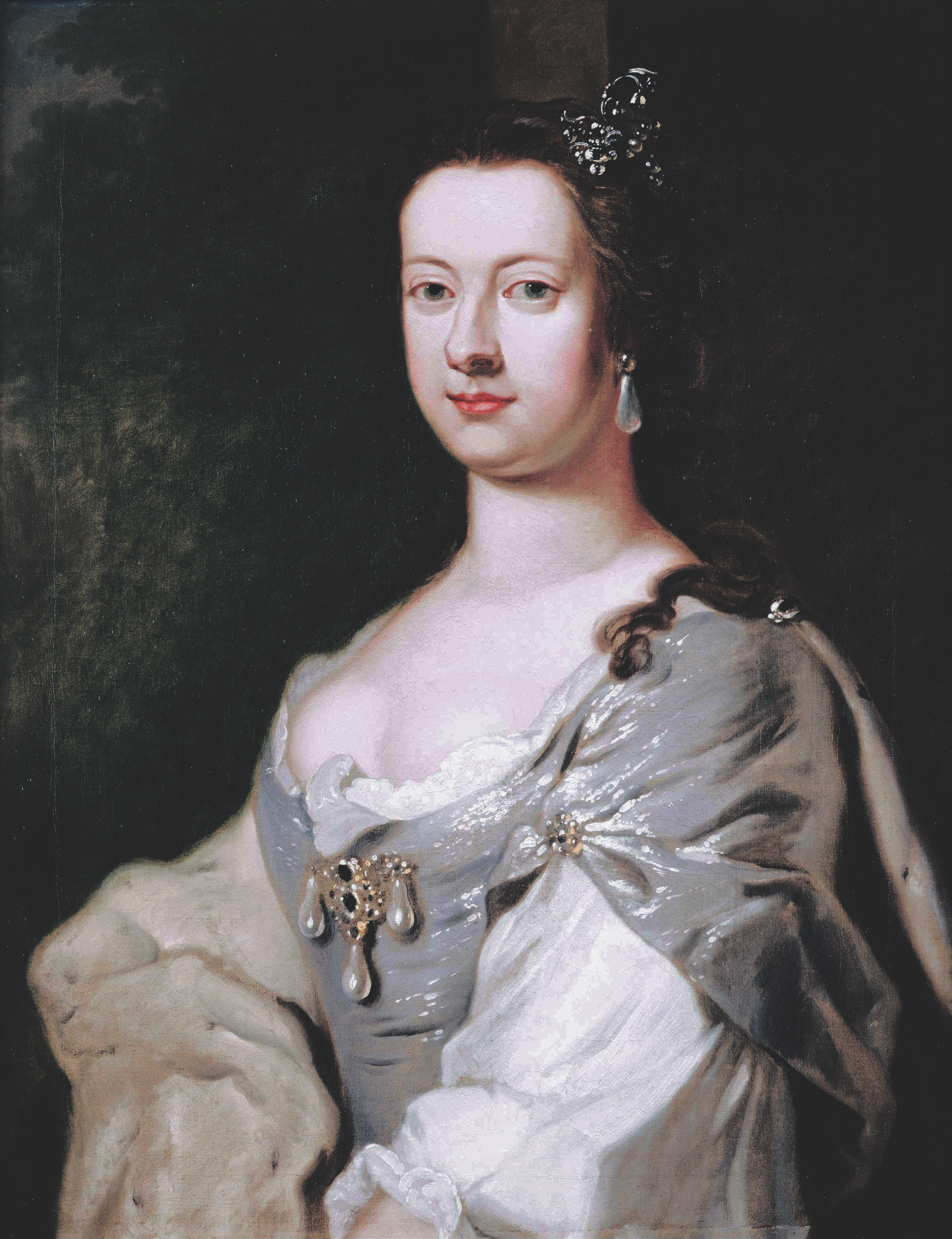
- Portrait attributed to George Knapton, c. 1748

Personal details
- Born: Lady Charlotte Elizabeth Boyle; 27 October 1731
- Died: 8 December 1754 (aged 23) Uppingham, Rutland
- Resting place: Derby Cathedral
- Spouse: William Cavendish, Marquess of Hartington (m. 1748)
- Children: William Cavendish, 5th Duke of Devonshire; Dorothy Bentinck, Duchess of Portland; Lord Richard Cavendish; George Cavendish, 1st Earl of Burlington
- Parent(s): Richard Boyle, 3rd Earl of Burlington; Lady Dorothy Savile

Charlotte Elizabeth Cavendish, Marchioness of Hartington, 6th Baroness Clifford (née Boyle; 27 October 1731 – 8 December 1754) was the daughter of Richard Boyle, 3rd Earl of Burlington and Lady Dorothy Savile. From 1748 until her death, she was married to William Cavendish, Marquess of Hartington, later the 4th Duke of Devonshire and Prime Minister of Great Britain.

== Family and early life ==
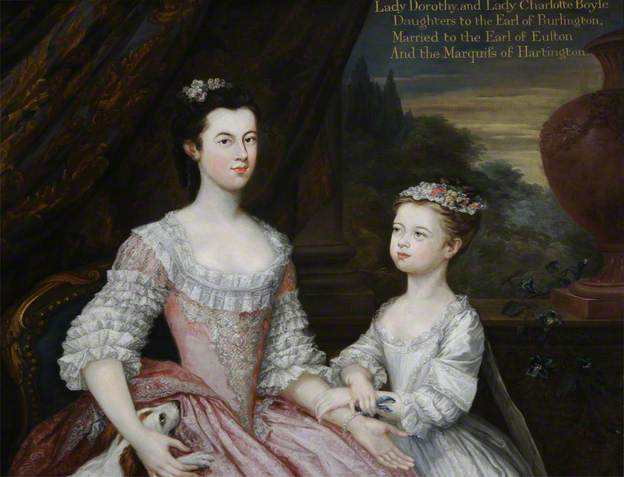
Dorothy Savile, Lady Dorothy Boyle (1724–1742), Countess of Euston, and Her Sister Lady Charlotte Boyle (1731–1754), Later Marchioness of Hartington, National Trust, Hardwick Hall. Supplied by The Public Catalogue Foundation.

Lady Charlotte Elizabeth Boyle was the only surviving daughter of Richard Boyle, 3rd Earl of Burlington and Lady Dorothy Savile. Her mother was the daughter of William Savile, 2nd Marquess of Halifax and Lady Mary Finch, daughter of the 2nd Earl of Nottingham

== Personal life ==
On 28 March 1748, she married William Cavendish, then the Marquess of Hartington, who later became the 4th Duke of Devonshire and the Prime Minister of Great Britain. The advantageous union had been arranged since childhood and was happy. The marriage helped him rise politically. They had four children: William, Dorothy, Richard, and George.

=== Baroness Clifford of Londesborough ===
Charlotte inherited great wealth upon the death of her father in 1754. As the heir of her father, she succeeded to the title of Baroness Clifford of Londesborough suo jure. Through her marriage, the Cavendish family, with the main title of Duke of Devonshire, inherited the 3rd Earl of Burlington's estates (the title went to the Orrery Boyles). These estates included: Burlington House, Piccadilly, London (now the Royal Academy of Arts); Chiswick House, London; Londesborough Hall, Yorkshire; Bolton Abbey, Yorkshire; Lismore Castle, County Waterford, Ireland. Charlotte was her father's sole remaining heir.

The Marchioness of Hartington died on 8 December 1754 at Uppingham, Rutland from smallpox. The next year her husband William succeeded his father as Duke of Devonshire.

=== Issue ===
Charlotte and her husband William had four children:

- William Cavendish, 5th Duke of Devonshire (14 December 1748 – 29 July 1811)
- Lady Dorothy Cavendish (27 August 1750 – 3 June 1794), married William Cavendish-Bentinck, 3rd Duke of Portland.
- Lord Richard Cavendish (19 June 1752 – 7 September 1781)
- George Augustus Henry Cavendish, 1st Earl of Burlington (31 March 1754 – 4 May 1834)

== Ancestors ==
Ancestors of Charlotte Cavendish, Marchioness of Hartington

Richard Boyle, 1st Earl of Burlington
Charles Boyle, Viscount Dungarvan
Lady Elizabeth Clifford
Charles Boyle, 2nd Earl of Burlington
William Seymour, 2nd Duke of Somerset
Lady Jane Seymour
Lady Frances Devereux
Richard Boyle, 3rd Earl of Burlington
Baptist Noel, 3rd Viscount Campden
The Hon. Henry Noel
Hester Wotton
Juliana Noel
Sir William Wale
Elizabeth Wale
Margaret Spark
Charlotte Boyle, 6th Baroness Clifford
Sir William Savile, 3rd Baronet
George Savile, 1st Marquess of Halifax
The Hon. Anne Coventry
William Savile, 2nd Marquess of Halifax
Henry Spencer, 1st Earl of Sunderland
Lady Dorothy Spencer
Lady Dorothy Sidney
Lady Dorothy Savile
Heneage Finch, 1st Earl of Nottingham
Daniel Finch, 7th Earl of Winchilsea
Elizabeth Harvey
Lady Mary Finch
Robert Rich, 3rd Earl of Warwick
Lady Essex Rich
Anne Cheeke

Peerage of England
Preceded by Richard Boyle	Baroness Clifford; 1753–1754	Succeeded by William Cavendish
