= Dorothy Boyle, Countess of Burlington =

British artist (1699–1758)

The Right Honourable The Countess of Burlington
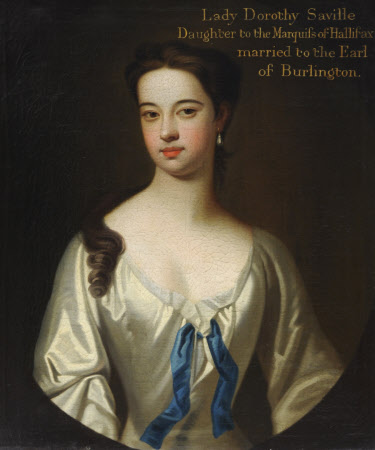
- Michael Dahl, Lady Dorothy Savile, Countess of Burlington and Countess of Cork, oil painting, 1720, Hardwick Hall, National Trust. (Note: Her portrait was also painted by James Worsdale, see James Worsdale, Lady Dorothy Savile.)
- Born: Dorothy Savile; 13 September 1699
- Died: 21 September 1758 (aged 59); Chiswick House
- Education: William Kent; Joseph Goupy
- Known for: Caricatures and portraits
- Spouse: Richard Boyle, 3rd Earl of Burlington (m. 1721; died 1753)
- Children: Dorothy FitzRoy, Countess of Euston; Lady Julianna Boyle; Charlotte Cavendish, Marchioness of Hartington
- Parents: William Savile, 2nd Marquess of Halifax (father); Lady Mary Finch (mother)

Dorothy Boyle, Countess of Burlington and Countess of Cork (née Savile; 13 September 1699 – 21 September 1758) was a British noble and court official, as well as a caricaturist and portrait painter. Several of her studies and paintings were made of her daughters. Through her daughter Charlotte, who married the 4th Duke of Devonshire. A collection of 24 of her works of art descended to the Duke of Devonshire and kept at Chatsworth House.

Boyle had a great interest in the arts and was a patron of David Garrick and George Frideric Handel. She was one of Queen Caroline's Ladies of the Bedchamber. Savile Row, developed at the edge of the Boyle's Burlington House estate, was named after her (based on her surname, Savile).

== Early life ==
Dorothy Boyle (née Savile) was the third surviving daughter of William Savile, 2nd Marquess of Halifaxby his second wife Lady Mary Finch, whose father was Daniel Finch, 2nd Earl Nottingham, 7th Earl of Winchilsea. Boyle was a co-heiress of her father's estate.

Boyle's two brothers both died when they were young. She had a sister, Lady Mary, who wed Sackville, 7th Earl of Thanet. Boyle also had a half-sister and 2nd cousin, Lady Anne (married to the 3rd Earl of Ailesbury), from her father's first marriage to Elizabeth Grimston, daughter of Sir Samuel Grimston and Lady Elizabeth Finch, sister of 2nd Earl of Nottingham.

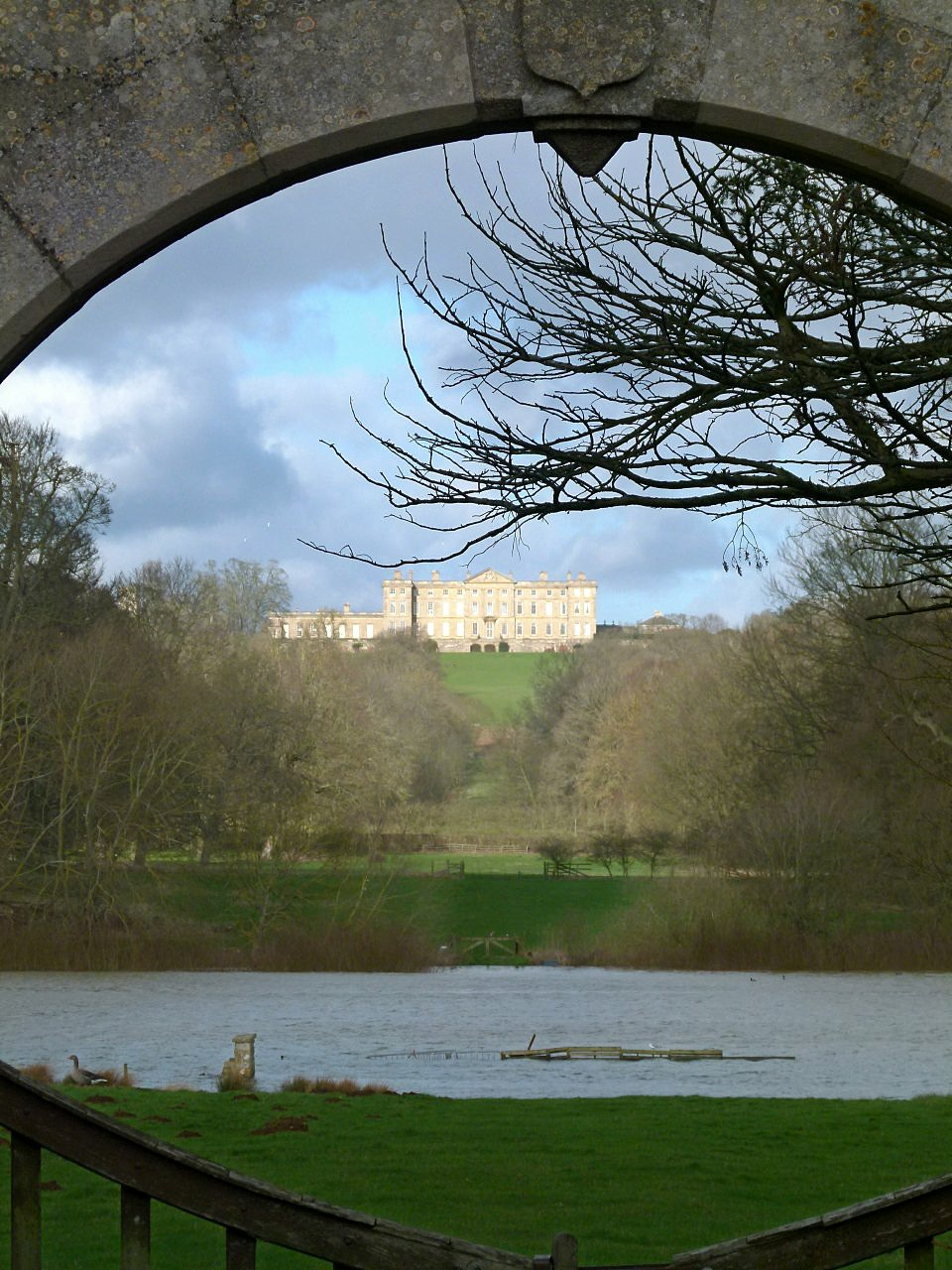
Burley on the Hill House, Rutland

Dorothy became an orphan when her mother died in 1718. Afterwards she went to live with her grandfather Daniel Finch, 2nd Earl of Nottingham at his home Burley on the hill with her many aunts and uncles.

She had an inheritance of £30,000 and an annual income of £1,600. The Duchess of Marlborough said that Boyle was “so desirable that everybody is fighting for the prize”. One of her suitors was the duchess's own widowed son in law, the wealthy Scroop Egerton, 4th Earl of Bridgewater (later 1st Duke of Bridgewater). He pursued Dorothy for over a year.

Bridgewater even went to her grandfather Lord Nottingham to persuade Dorothy. Bridgewater was upset when he found out that Boyle had apparently banned her grandfather from mentioning Bridgewater. Dorothy's first cousin, the Duchess of Bolton, was puzzled by her refusals and attempted to persuade her, she said if Dorothy requires a higher title, Bridgewater would be made a Duke soon and he has £10,000 a year. But it is evident that riches and a dukedom were not enough to persuade Dorothy.

Two years later, she married Lord Burlington in 1721. He had relatively lesser fortune and title, but both shared the love of arts, he was called the "architect Earl".

== Artist ==
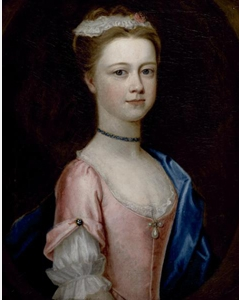
Dorothy Savile, Portrait of Lady Charlotte Boyle, Marchioness of Hartington (1731–1754), circa 1740, Chatsworth House. Attributed to Dorothy Savile

Boyle studied how to draw and paint portraits with pastels with William Kent and made copies of good portraits to develop her talent. Kent, who lived with Savile and Boyle for 30 years, studied painting in Rome and in addition to being an artist, he was a designer and landscape gardener.

Kent and Boyle made portraits of each other and George Vertue commented that Boyle's painting of Kent was "much more like than that done by Aikman". By the mid-1720s she had also studied with Joseph Goupy. During that time she advanced from pastels to oil painting. According to Neil Jeffares and the British Museum, she may have had lessons from Charles Jervas, the King's portrait painter.

Lady Boyle was a talented caricaturist and made good, though rapid, portraits. Horace Walpole said of Boyle, "She drew in crayons, and succeeded admirably in likenesses; but working with too much rapidity did not do justice to her genius. She had an uncommon talent too for caricatura."

Boyle made a portrait of daughter Dorothy from memory seven weeks after her daughter's death. Of the paintings at Chatsworth, the "new house" at Chiswick, 24 of the works were created by Boyle. Mrs. Selwyn, Lady Isabella Finch, and Lady Fitzwalter were among the friends to have received eight of Boyle's pastels that are now among the Chatsworth collection. The works in the collection include three oil paintings and pastel studies of her daughters and an oil painting of Princess Amelia. Her sketch, Woman at Harpsichord, with a Dog and a Cat, reveals an intimate scene where the woman plays a tune for her own pleasure.

She made a sketch of her friend Alexander Pope (Note: At times she was like Pope's amanuensis, a draft of Master Key to Popery in her handwriting resides at the former home of her youngest daughter, Charlotte, at Chatsworth House.) in his grotto and enjoyed making caricatures. He wrote five quatrains about her entitled On the Countess of B—— cutting paper.

== Queen Caroline ==
Boyle was one of Queen Caroline's Ladies of the Bedchamber. She was appointed to the post in 1727 at the same time as Mary, the Countess of Pembroke. On her appointment Lord Hervey said her manner was like 'a cringing House-Maid.'

== Philanthropy ==
Boyle was one of the signatories to Thomas Coram's 1735 petition to King George II calling for the foundation of the Foundling Hospital. She signed the petition on 19 May on the same day as the Countess of Cardigan. The petition was initially unsuccessful, but Dorothy influenced her husband, Richard Boyle, 3rd Earl of Burlington, who in 1739 became involved in the creation of the Foundling Hospital and became a governor of the charity.

Alongside her husband, Richard Boyle, Boyle was a patron of the arts, taking a supporting interest in both David Garrick and George Frideric Handel. Garrick and Boyle were correspondents and a letter survives in the Folger Library collection from Garrick to Boyle from October 1750. Additionally the celebrated dancer Eva Marie Veigel (also known as Violette) lived with Boyle at her home Burlington House when she first came over to England in 1746. Garrick fell in love with the young dancer and in 1749 they wed. Boyle was initially against the match but was later persuaded to support the marriage.

== Savile Row ==
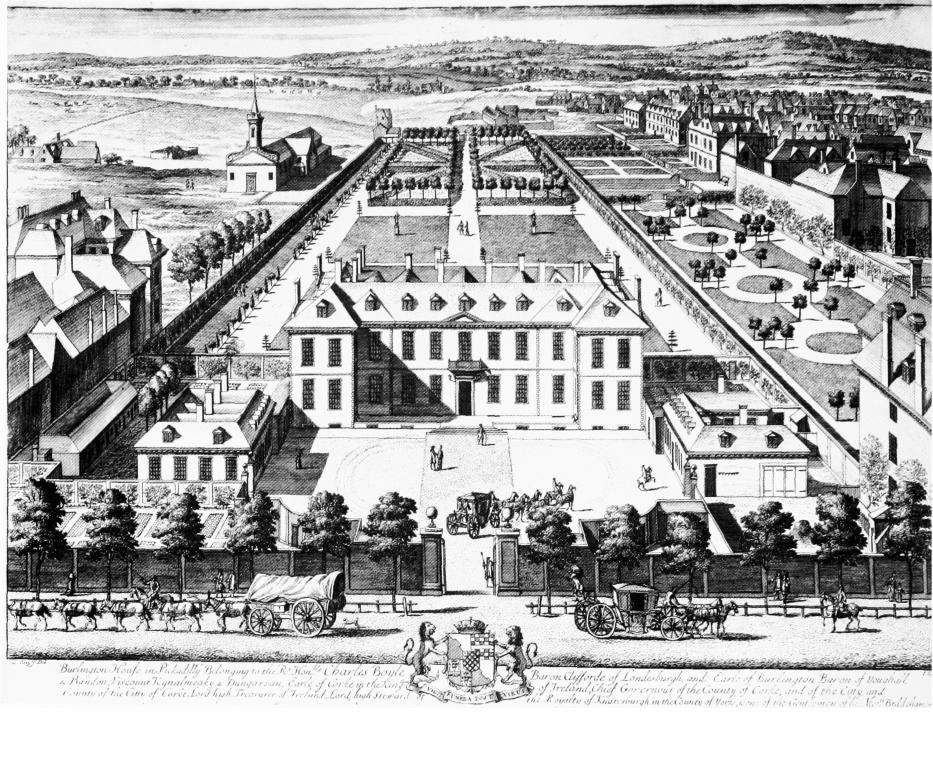
A view of Burlington House in the 1690s, forming the centrepiece of the Burlington Estate.

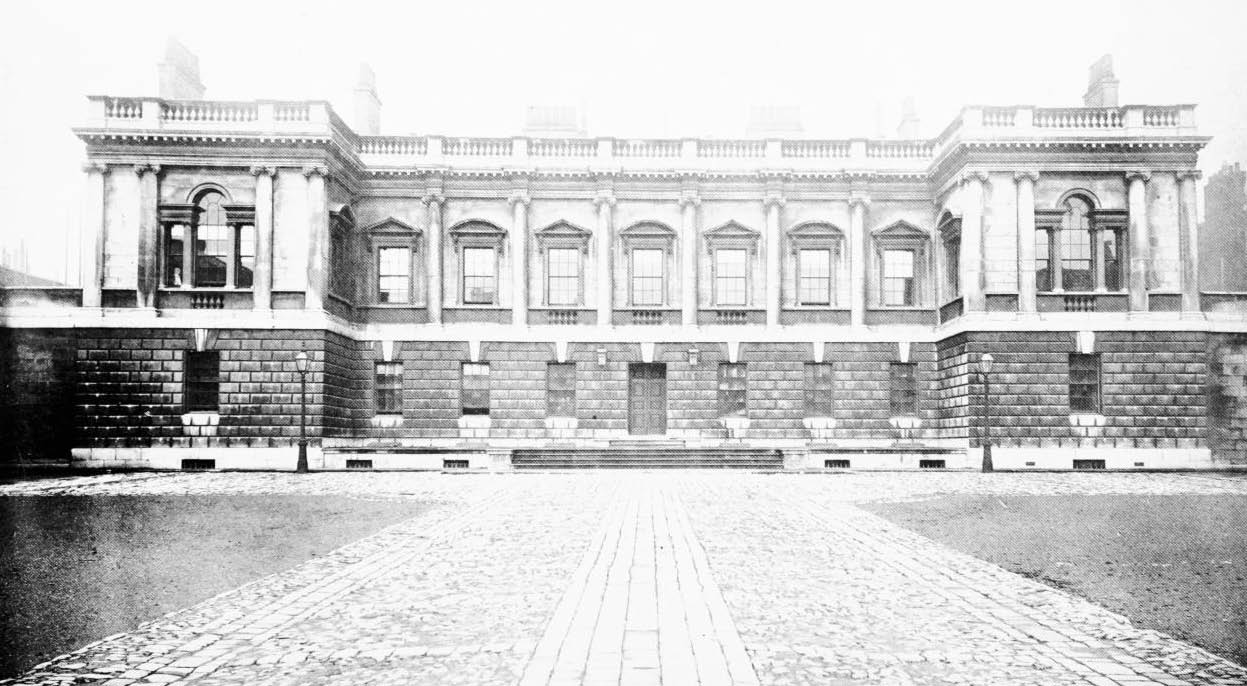
Burlington House south front. Designed in 1725 by Colen Campbell (1676 - 1729).

Boyle drew up plans for a new street for townhouses. The Daily Post reported on 12 March 1733 that new buildings were about to be built on Savile Street in Mayfair, London. The Burlington Estate project was named after Lady Dorothy Boyle's maiden name, Savile. Savile Row was built by 1735 on freehold land known as Ten Acres belonging to a merchant tailor, William Maddox, By the late 18th century, it was a centre for high-quality tailor shops.

== Marriage and later life ==
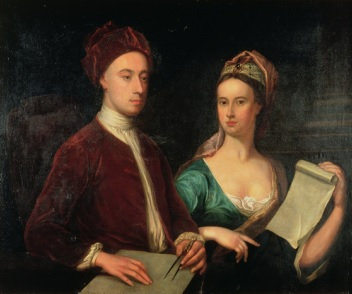
William Aikman, Rt. Hon. Richard Boyle and Lady Dorothy Savile, 1723, Harris Museum and Art Gallery, Preston, Lancashire

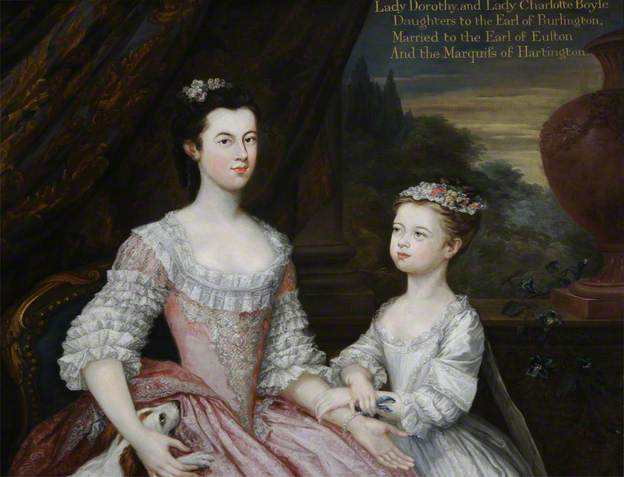
Dorothy Savile, Lady Dorothy Boyle (1724–1742), Countess of Euston, and Her Sister Lady Charlotte Boyle (1731–1754), Later Marchioness of Hartington, National Trust, Hardwick Hall. (Note: Her painting Lady Dorothy Boyle (1724–1742), Countess of Euston, and Her Sister Lady Charlotte Boyle (1731–1754), Later Marchioness of Hartington is in the Hardwick Hall, National Trust collection in Doe Lea, Chesterfield, Derbyshire, England. It was donated to the National Trust in 1959.)

Dorothy Savile married Richard Boyle, 3rd Earl of Burlington on 21 March 1721 and brought a substantial dowry and a shared interest of theatre and music to the marriage. She enjoyed the opera, music, and theatre and was a patron of the arts, including David Garrick and George Frideric Handel. Her favourite writer was John Gay.

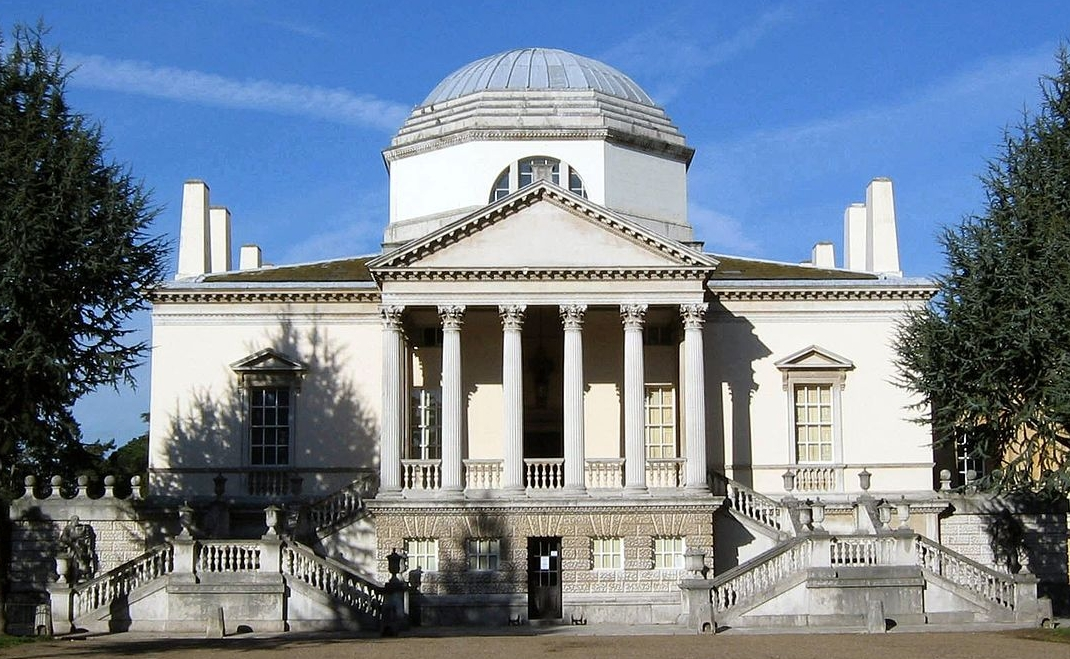
Chiswick House

Soon after their marriage, Boyle began modernising Chiswick House and its grounds. They also lived at Londesborough, East Riding of Yorkshire and in London at Burlington House.

Boyle had three daughters:

1. Dorothy (1724–1742)
2. Julianna (1727–1730)
3. Charlotte (1731–1754).

Jean-Baptiste van Loo painted a family portrait of Dorothy Boyle, her husband, and three daughters in 1739. The painting is currently located in Lismore Castle's Devonshire Collection.

In 1741, Boyle's eldest daughter, Dorothy, married the Earl of Euston, eldest son of Charles FitzRoy, 2nd Duke of Grafton and died of smallpox just before her eighteenth birthday in 1742. Her husband "treated her with the utmost brutality, till her death." He was later disowned by his father.

Her youngest daughter, Charlotte, married William Cavendish, Marquess of Hartington (later 4th Duke of Devonshire), on 28 March 1748. Charlotte died of smallpox in 1754. She became heiress to the entire Burlington fortune and passed down her mother's artwork and correspondence to her descendants.

The Countess of Burlington died on 21 September 1758, aged 59.The remaining Burlington estate went to her grandson, William Cavendish, 5th Duke of Devonshire.

== Ancestry ==
Ancestors of Dorothy Boyle, Countess of Burlington

8. Sir George Savile
4. George Savile, 1st Marquess of Halifax
9. Hon. Anne Coventry
2. William Savile, 2nd Marquess of Halifax
10. Henry Spencer, 1st Earl of Sunderland
5. Lady Dorothy Spencer
11. Lady Dorothy Sydney
1. Lady Dorothy Savile
12. Heneage Finch, 1st Earl of Nottingham
6. Daniel Finch, 2nd Earl of Nottingham
13. Elizabeth Harvey
3. Lady Mary Finch
14. Robert Rich, 3rd Earl of Warwick
7. Lady Essex Rich
15. Anne Cheeke
