= Robert Spencer, 2nd Earl of Sunderland =

English nobleman and politician (1641–1702)

The Right Honourable The Earl of Sunderland KG PC
- Robert Spencer, Second Earl of Sunderland

Lord Chamberlain
- In office 19 April 1697 – 26 December 1697
- Monarch: William III
- Preceded by: The Earl of Dorset
- Succeeded by: The Duke of Shrewsbury (Note: King William III did not accept Sunderland’s resignation until 1699, but from 1697 to 1699 the office remained effectively vacant.)

Lord President of the Council
- In office 4 December 1685 – 28 October 1688
- Monarch: James II
- Preceded by: The Marquess of Halifax
- Succeeded by: The Viscount Preston

Secretary of State for the Southern Department
- In office 14 April 1684 – 28 October 1688
- Monarchs: Charles II; James II
- Preceded by: Leoline Jenkins
- Succeeded by: The Earl of Middleton
- In office 26 April 1680 – 2 February 1681
- Monarch: Charles II
- Preceded by: Henry Coventry
- Succeeded by: Leoline Jenkins

Secretary of State for the Northern Department
- In office 28 January 1683 – 14 April 1684
- Monarch: Charles II
- Preceded by: The Earl of Conway
- Succeeded by: Sidney Godolphin
- In office 10 February 1679 – 26 April 1680
- Monarch: Charles II
- Preceded by: Joseph Williamson
- Succeeded by: Leoline Jenkins

Personal details
- Born: Robert Spencer; 5 September 1641 Paris, Kingdom of France
- Died: 28 September 1702 (aged 61) Althorp, Northamptonshire
- Resting place: Brington, Northamptonshire
- Spouse: Anne Digby (m. 1665)
- Children: 4, including Charles
- Parent(s): Henry Spencer, 1st Earl of Sunderland; Dorothy Sidney
- Education: Christ Church, Oxford
- Occupation: Politician

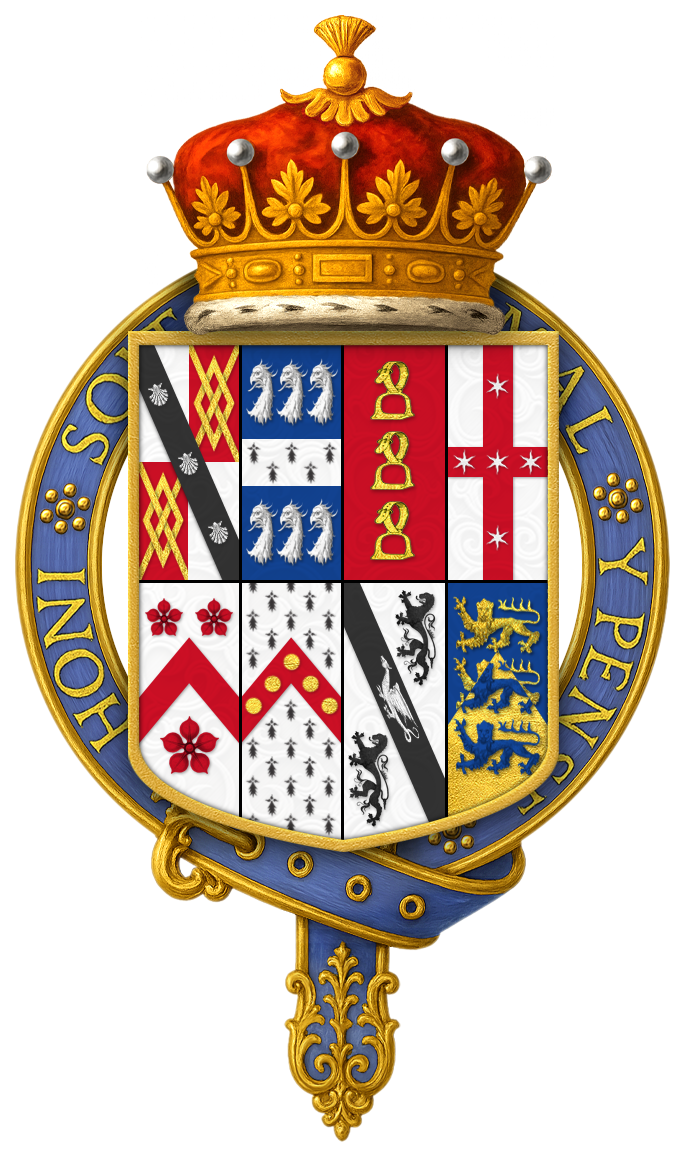
Quartered arms of Robert Spencer, 2nd Earl of Sunderland, KG, PC

Robert Spencer, 2nd Earl of Sunderland, KG, PC (5 September 1641 – 28 September 1702) was an English nobleman and politician of the Spencer family. An able and gifted statesman, his caustic temper and belief in absolute monarchy nevertheless made him numerous enemies. He was forced to flee England in 1688, but later established himself with the new regime after the Glorious Revolution of that year. Subsequently, he took on a more disinterested role as an adviser to the Crown, seeking neither office nor favour. He evinced no party loyalty, but was devoted to his country's interests, as he saw them. By the notoriously lax standards of the Restoration Court, his private life was remarkably free from scandal, which won him favour in the more sober post-Revolution state.

== Life ==
=== Early life ===
Robert Spencer was born in Paris in 1641. His father was Henry Spencer, 1st Earl of Sunderland, who was killed at the First Battle of Newbury, and his mother was the Lady Dorothy Sidney, daughter of Robert Sidney, 2nd Earl of Leicester. At the age of three he inherited his father's dignities, becoming Baron of Wormleighton and Earl of Sunderland. Lady Sunderland had him educated after his father's death, first engaging a Calvinist tutor for him, Dr Thomas Pierce, and afterwards sending him to Christ Church, Oxford. After quitting school he joined the English Army, rising to the rank of captain in Prince Rupert's Regiment of Horse. On 10 June 1665 he was married to Lady Anne Digby. She was the daughter of the 2nd Earl of Bristol, and died in 1715. Sunderland then served successively as ambassador to Madrid (1671–1672), Paris (1672–1673), and the United Provinces (1673). He was Gentleman of the Bedchamber from 1673 to 1679, before being invested a Privy Councillor and appointed Secretary of State for the Northern Department in 1679. At the same time, he served as Ambassador Extraordinary to Paris.

His political skills and energetic character rapidly marked him as a rising man: even Bishop Burnet, who disliked him, praised his statesmanship and his "quick and ready apprehension, and swift decision of business". He was accused by some of seeking and clinging to office simply for the salary, to support his reportedly extravagant lifestyle. Despite his otherwise blameless life he had a weakness for gambling, which often involved him in debt, and a passion for art. He was a collector of paintings, and made extensive alterations to Althorp, but his private life was sober, and he was personally inexpensive.

=== Career under Charles II and James II ===
Sunderland's professed mission was to aggrandise England in the European community, and to strengthen her diplomatic ties with the other rivals of French power. He laboured from 1679 to 1681 to conjoin an alliance against France, but apart from a treaty with Spain in 1680, little came of it.

Sunderland's relations with Paul Barillon, whose long tenure as Ambassador from Louis XIV (from 1677 to 1688) produced many memorable exchanges between the two, were tenuous and strained. When Louis failed to give James any assistance against the Monmouth Rebellion of 1685, Sunderland told Barillon sharply "the King your master may have plans I cannot discern, but I hope he will put things right by making it clear that this has all been a misunderstanding". When Barillon protested that his master's aim was "the Peace of Europe" Sunderland said that it was impossible for everyone in Europe to want peace at the same time: "myself I think it will last until one side or the other has a good reason for breaking it". To prevent Barillon from gaining too much influence, Sunderland intercepted and leaked an unusually indiscreet dispatch where the Ambassador boasted of having blocked an Anglo-Dutch treaty. Charles II was predictably furious, and Barillon was for a time forbidden from the Court. Sunderland remarked that if Barillon would behave himself so, it was "but just that it come home to him".

Lord Sunderland also served as Lord Lieutenant of Staffordshire during the minority of Lord Shrewsbury until 1681. That year, he was dismissed by Charles II, due to his opposition to the Duke of York's succession. Soon Sunderland regained the King's confidence (through the principal royal mistress, the Duchess of Portsmouth). Intermittently, between 1682 and 1688, he served as Secretary of State for the Southern Department, Lord Lieutenant of Warwickshire, and Lord President of the Council; in 1687, he signed the King's grant of religious freedom for the Brenttown (Brenton) tract in Prince William County, Virginia, to encourage settlement of French Protestants. The same year he openly embraced the Roman Catholic faith, insincerely, it would seem, and merely to please the King. Later that year he was made a Knight of the Garter.

However, while he enjoyed the confidence of Queen Mary of Modena, it was clear that he was growing uncomfortable under the recently enthroned James: the violently hostile reception he got from the public when he gave evidence at the Trial of the Seven Bishops left him badly shaken. When he urged James to put away his mistress Catherine Sedley, Countess of Dorchester, James said that he had not realised Sunderland was his confessor, and told him to mind his own business for the future. Sunderland's unpopularity was now almost universal: Burnet wrote that it was "the wonder of all mankind" that James continued to employ him. He was summarily dismissed at last in October 1688, with the remark, "You have your pardon; much good doe it you. I hope you will be more faithful to your next master than you have been to me."

=== Career under William III ===
Sunderland escaped in disguise to Rotterdam in the Netherlands, where he lay low for some time, before being officially arrested, and immediately released, by the Dutch authorities. Offering his service to the Prince of Orange, he moved on to Utrecht, where he remained quietly for the duration of the upheavals in England, when William III and Mary II took the throne. Afterwards, he wrote to Sir John Churchill, a prominent English statesman, asking him to "make things easy for a man in my condition". Despite his notorious rudeness and bad temper, Sunderland had a surprising ability to make lasting friendships, and some of his friends, including John Evelyn and Thomas Tenison, had influence with the new régime. His sister Dorothy had married George Savile, 1st Marquess of Halifax, a key adviser to William III in the early years of his reign, and though he and Sunderland had never been close, Halifax felt obliged from family solidarity to make a plea on Sunderland's behalf. At first, William III excepted Sunderland from the Indemnity Act of 23 May 1690, but he was allowed to return to the country early the next year. At the same time, he had been excepted from James' 1692 Instrument of Pardon.

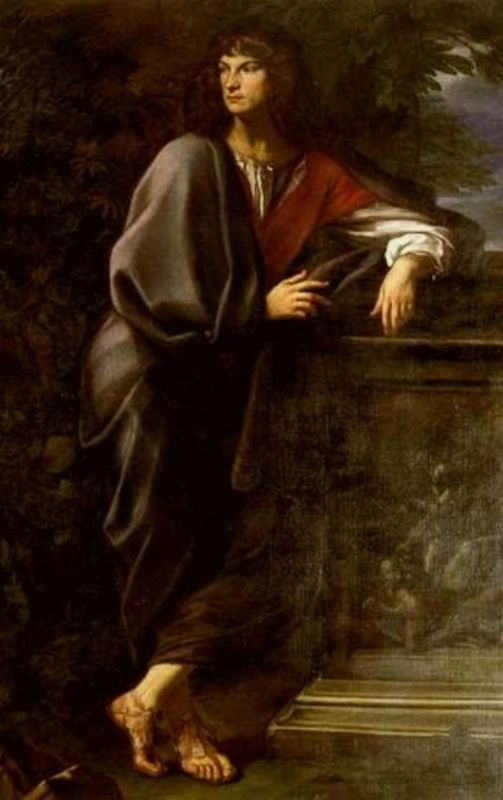
Sunderland in Classical Dress, by Carlo Maratta

On his return, Sunderland formally reverted to Anglicanism, taking the oaths in April 1691 and quietly recommenced sitting in the House of Lords. In May William paid a visit to him at his home at Althorp, in Northamptonshire, to discuss public affairs. Over the next years, the King frequently visited him and gave him confidence, but Sunderland did not dare to fully enter public life until September 1693, when he took a house in the city. He repeatedly advised the King to select all of his ministers from one political party, and eventually effected a reconciliation between William and his sister-in-law, the later Queen Anne. He was an influential adviser, inducing William to accept only Whigs in his government. William, never vindictive, was untroubled by Sunderland's past services to James, who had made it very clear that Sunderland was the one man he would never forgive, though he had made tentative advances towards the fallen King. Most of William's servants had at sometime betrayed him, and he valued Sunderland for his frankness and ability to voice unwelcome truths. It has been suggested that Sunderland's notorious rudeness actually appealed to the King, who detested flattery and could himself be distinctly rude. Once when William said that, while the Whigs personally liked him better than the Tories, the Tories were better friends to Monarchy, Sunderland shrewdly replied: "but you must consider that you are not their Monarch". He even wrote a letter telling the King that if his Ministers were not fit for his service, it was his own fault for not choosing better men.

This notable lack of ordinary good manners made Sunderland countless enemies: Bishop Burnet wrote that "he had too much heat, both of imagination and of passion, was apt to speak freely both of persons and things, and raised himself many enemies from a contemptuous treatment of those who differed from him". His remarkable ability to adapt to the wishes of three different monarchs was considered a fault rather than a virtue: as Burnet observed "he came by this to lose so much that even those who esteemed his parts depended little on his probity".

While his own private life was blameless, Sunderland in the winter of 1697–98 became involved in a scandal when his daughter Elizabeth's husband, Lord Clancarty, a leading Jacobite, escaped from the Tower of London. The marriage had been arranged between Sunderland and Clancarty's uncle Justin McCarthy, Viscount Mountcashel, when the young bride was but thirteen and her husband only three years older; it had proved a disaster which greatly damaged Sunderland's reputation. Clancarty escaped and found Elizabeth, whom he had not seen since 1684, persuading her to consummate the marriage at long last. The servants alerted her brother Charles, who had Clancarty arrested. The resulting furore gravely embarrassed Sunderland, but seems to have merely amused the King, who dryly remarked that no one wanted to speak to him of anything but "that little spark Clancarty". He gave the couple permission to move to Germany, where they settled in Altona, Hamburg, and there they lived out their lives. Elizabeth never saw her parents or her brother again.

Sunderland became Lord Chamberlain of the Household in April 1697, and was a Lord Justice for a short period, but "the general suspicion with which he was regarded terrified him". At the same time he was approaching sixty, a respectable age in those days, and besides his health was failing. He eventually retired from public life in December 1697.

Sunderland died in 1702. He had led a secluded life at Althorp for some time, and his only surviving son, Charles, succeeded to his titles and honours.

== Family ==
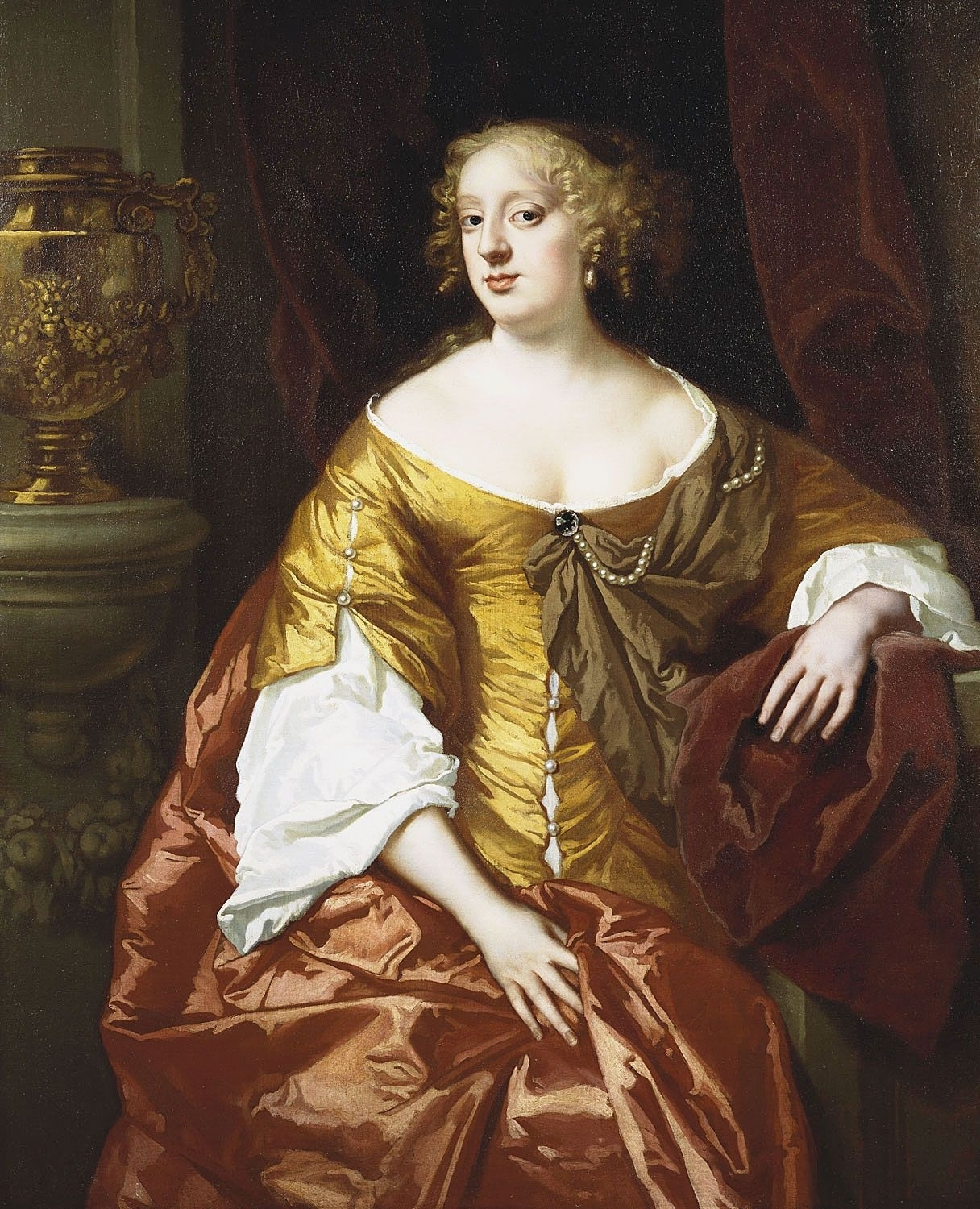
Anne, Countess of Sunderland

He married Anne Digby, daughter of George Digby, 2nd Earl of Bristol, on 9 June 1665. After an awkward start, when Sunderland broke off the engagement for no known reason, the marriage was a very happy one: Lady Sunderland was rumoured to have had numerous lovers, but there is little evidence to support this, and Sunderland, despite his questionable political principles, was a devoted husband and father. They had at least five children.

- Robert Spencer (1666–1688).
- Anne Spencer (1667–1690), married James Douglas, 4th Duke of Hamilton.
- Isabella Spencer (1668–1684).
- Elizabeth Spencer (1671–1704), married Donough MacCarthy, 4th Earl of Clancarty.
- Charles Spencer (c. 1674–1722), succeeded as 3rd Earl of Sunderland.

They are believed to have had two or more other children who died young, as Lady Sunderland referred in a letter to "my two living of seven children".

== See also ==
- Whig Junto

== Ancestry ==
Ancestors of Robert Spencer, 2nd Earl of Sunderland

8. Robert Spencer, 1st Baron Spencer of Wormleighton
4. William Spencer, 2nd Baron Spencer of Wormleighton
9. Margaret Willoughby
2. Henry Spencer, 1st Earl of Sunderland
10. Henry Wriothesley, 3rd Earl of Southampton
5. Lady Penelope Wriothesley
11. Elizabeth Vernon
1. Robert Spencer, 2nd Earl of Sunderland
12. Robert Sidney, 1st Earl of Leicester
6. Robert Sidney, 2nd Earl of Leicester
13. Barbara Gamage
3. Lady Dorothy Sidney
14. Henry Percy, 9th Earl of Northumberland
7. Lady Dorothy Percy
15. Lady Dorothy Devereux

== Notes and references ==
- Speck, W. A. (January 2008). "Spencer, Robert, second earl of Sunderland (1641–1702)". Oxford Dictionary of National Biography (online ed.). Oxford University Press. doi:10.1093/ref:odnb/26135. (Subscription, Wikipedia Library access or UK public library membership required.)
- Gilbert Burnet History of His Own Time Abridged edition by Thomas Stackhouse Everyman's Library 1906
- Kenyon, John Phillipps (1958), Robert Spencer Earl of Sunderland (1641–1702), Westport, Connecticut: Greenwood Press Publishers, ISBN 9780837181509

Political offices
Preceded by Joseph Williamson	Secretary of State for the Northern Department; 1679–1680	Succeeded by Leoline Jenkins
Preceded by Henry Coventry	Secretary of State for the Southern Department; 1680–1681	Succeeded by Leoline Jenkins
Preceded by The Earl of Conway	Secretary of State for the Northern Department; 1683–1684	Succeeded by Sidney Godolphin
Preceded by Leoline Jenkins	Secretary of State for the Southern Department; 1684–1688	Succeeded by The Earl of Middleton
Preceded by The Marquess of Halifax	Lord President of the Council; 1685–1688	Succeeded by The Viscount Preston
Preceded by The Earl of Dorset	Lord Chamberlain; 1697	Succeeded by The Duke of Shrewsbury
Honorary titles
Preceded by The Duke of Monmouth	Lord Lieutenant of Staffordshire; 1679–1681	Succeeded by The Earl of Shrewsbury
Preceded by The Duke of Monmouth	Custos Rotulorum of Staffordshire; 1680–1681	Succeeded by The Earl of Shrewsbury
Preceded by The Earl of Conway	Lord Lieutenant of Warwickshire; 1683–1686	Succeeded by The Earl of Northampton
Preceded by The Earl of Conway	Custos Rotulorum of Warwickshire; 1683–1689	Succeeded by The Earl of Northampton
Preceded by The Earl of Northampton	Lord Lieutenant of Warwickshire; 1687–1689	Succeeded by The Earl of Northampton
Peerage of England
Preceded by Henry Spencer	Earl of Sunderland; 2nd creation 1643–1702	Succeeded by Charles Spencer
Diplomatic posts
Preceded by Edward Montagu, 1st Earl of Sandwich	English Ambassador to Spain; 1671–1672	Succeeded by Sir Henry Goodricke, 2nd Baronet
Preceded by John Brisbane (as Chargé d'affaires)	English Ambassador to France; 1678–1679	Succeeded by Henry Savile
