= Dorothy Sidney =

Dorothy Sidney may refer to:

- Dorothy Sidney, Countess of Leicester (née Dorothy Percy) (c. 1598 – 1659)
- Dorothy Spencer, Countess of Sunderland (1617–1684), daughter of the above
