= Anne Vaughan =

Anne Vaughan may refer to:

- Anne Locke (née Vaughan, 1530–after 1590), English poet
- Anne Vaughan, Countess of Carbery (1663–1690)
- Anne Vaughan, Duchess of Bolton (1689–1751), daughter of Anne Vaughan, Countess of Carbery
