= Foxcroft =

Foxcroft may refer to:

== Places ==
- Foxcroft, a former city now part of Dover-Foxcroft, Maine
- Foxcroft Academy, in Dover-Foxcroft, Maine
- Foxcroft School, in Middleburg, Virginia

== People ==
- Charles Foxcroft
- Dean Foxcroft
- Ezechiel Foxcroft
- George Foxcroft
- H. C. Foxcroft
- Peter Foxcroft
- Robert Foxcroft
- Thomas Foxcroft (minister)
- Thomas Foxcroft (slave trader)
- Vicky Foxcroft, British Labour Party politician
