= Dorothy Percy =

Dorothy Percy may refer to:

- Dorothy Percy, Countess of Northumberland (née Dorothy Devereux)
- Dorothy Sidney, Countess of Leicester, née Dorothy Percy, her daughter
