= Marquess of Halifax =

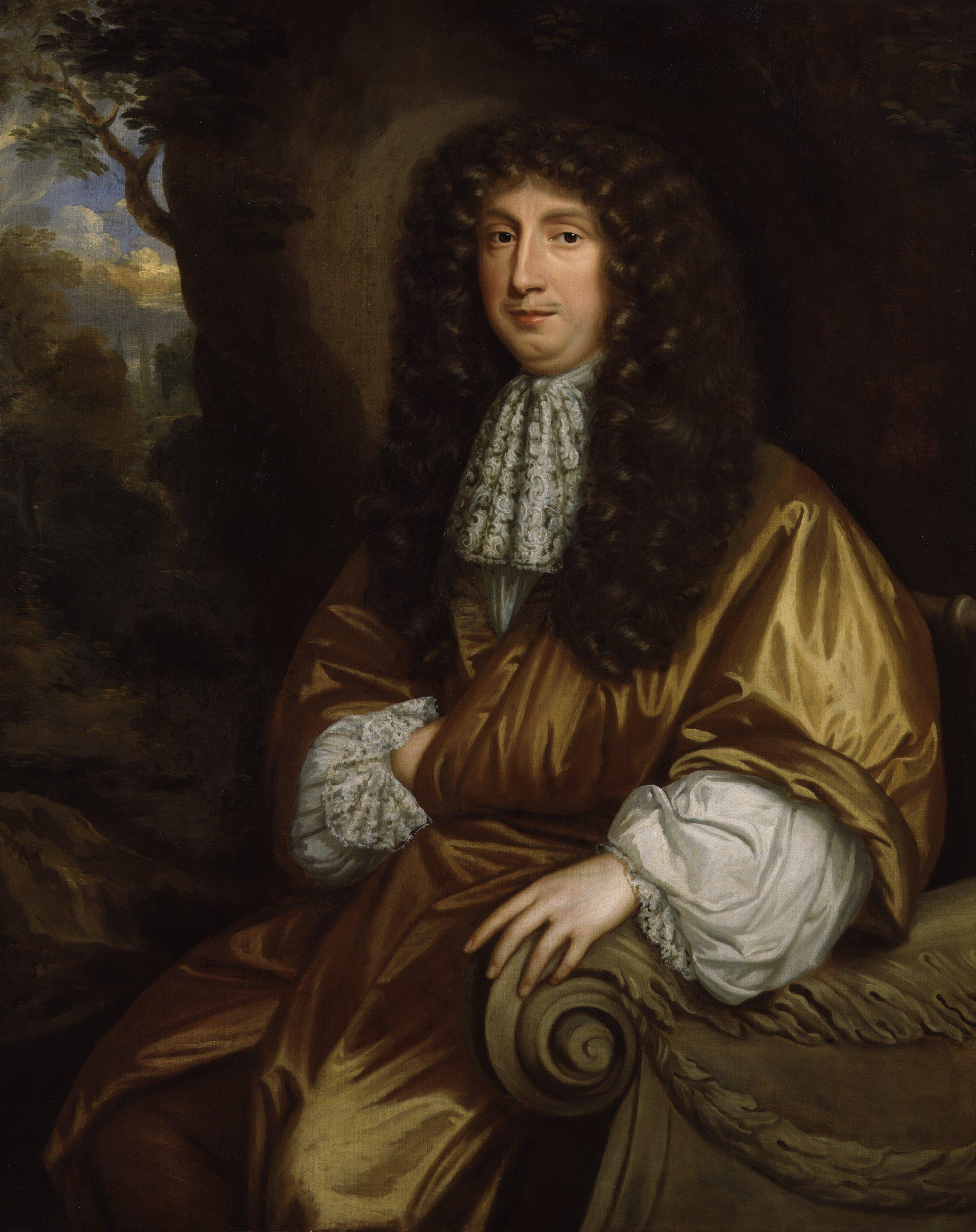
George Savile, 1st Marquess of Halifax

The title Marquess of Halifax was created in the Peerage of England in 1682 for the George Savile, 1st Earl of Halifax.

He had previously been created Baron Savile, of Elland in the County of York, Viscount Halifax in 1668, and Earl of Halifax in 1679, all also in the Peerage of England. The baronetcy, styled "of Thornhill in the County of York", had been created in the Baronetage of England in 1611 for his great-grandfather George Savile. All peerages became extinct on the death of the 2nd Marquess in 1700. The baronetcy was inherited by a kinsman, the 6th Baronet, and became extinct on the death of the 8th Baronet in 1784.

The courtesy title used by the heir apparent to the earldom and marquessate was Lord Elland, taken from the territorial designation of the barony of Savile. The family seat was originally Thornhill Hall, which was destroyed in the English Civil War, after which the seat was transferred to Rufford Abbey.

== Family ==
The 1st Marquess's sister married the 1st Earl of Plymouth. His daughter by his first wife (daughter of the 1st Earl of Sunderland) married the 3rd Earl of Carbery. His daughter by his second wife (sister of the 1st Duke of Kingston) married the 3rd Earl of Chesterfield.

The 2nd Marquess was son of the first by his first marriage. He married Mary Finch, a daughter of the 2nd Earl of Nottingham and Lady Essex Rich. Essex was daughter of the 3rd Earl of Warwick and Anne Cheeke. Anne was daughter of Sir Thomas Cheeke of Pirgo and a senior Essex Rich. The elder Essex was daughter of the 1st Earl of Warwick and Penelope Devereux, Lady Rich. Essex was probably named after her maternal grandfather the 1st Earl of Essex. Her maternal grandmother was Lettice Knollys. William Savile was father-in-law to the 4th Earl of Cork, the 7th Earl of Thanet and the 4th Earl of Elgin.

== The Savile estates ==
The 8th and last Savile Baronet bequeathed the Nottinghamshire and Yorkshire estates (including Rufford Abbey and Thornhill) of the family on his nephew, The Hon. Richard Lumley-Saunderson, later 6th Earl of Scarbrough, younger son of the 4th Earl of Scarbrough and Barbara Savile, sister and heiress of Sir George Savile. Eventually, in 1887, the Savile estates passed to his great-nephew, the diplomat John Lumley-Savile, who assumed the surname of Savile only and was created Baron Savile the following year.

== Savile baronets, of Thornhill (1611) ==
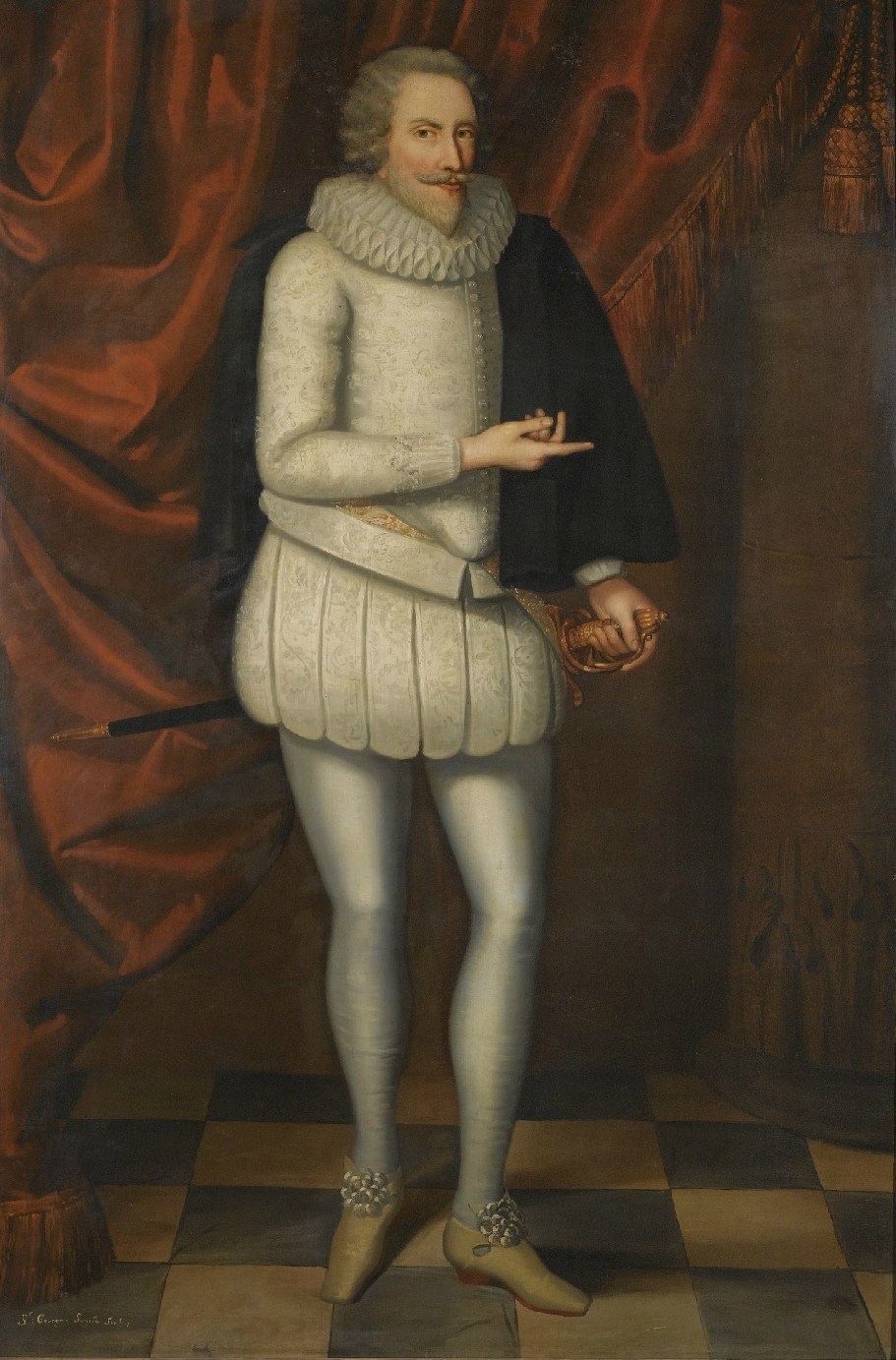
Portrait of Sir George Savile, 1st Baronet, by Marcus Gheeraerts the Younger

- Sir George Savile, 1st Baronet (1551–1622)
- Sir George Savile, 2nd Baronet (c. 1611 – 1626)
- Sir William Savile, 3rd Baronet (1612–1644)
- Sir George Savile, 4th Baronet (1633–1695) (created Viscount Halifax in 1668)

=== Viscount Halifax (1668) ===
- George Savile, 1st Viscount Halifax (1633–1695) (created Earl of Halifax in 1679)

=== Earl of Halifax (1679) ===
- George Savile, 1st Earl of Halifax (1633–1695) (created Marquess of Halifax in 1682)

=== Marquess of Halifax (1682) ===
- George Savile, 1st Marquess of Halifax (1633–1695)
- William Savile, 2nd Marquess of Halifax (1665–1700)

=== Savile baronets, of Thornhill (1611; reverted) ===
- Sir John Savile, 6th Baronet (c. 1651 – 1704)
- Sir George Savile, 7th Baronet (1678–1743)
- Sir George Savile, 8th Baronet (1726–1784)

=== Title succession chart ===
Title succession chart, Savile baronets and Marquesses of Halifax.

Sir George Savile; 1st Baronet; 1551–1622
Sir George Savile; 1583–1614	Sir John Savile died 1660	Henry Savile; 1599–1666
Sir George Savile; 2nd Baronet c. 1611 – 1626	Sir William Savile; 3rd Baronet; 1612–1644	Sir John Savile; 6th Baronet c. 1651 – 1704	Thomas Savile died 1677	Rev. John Savile died 1700
Viscount Halifax; Earl of Halifax; Marquess of Halifax
George Savile; 1st Marquess of Halifax; 1633–1695	Sir George Savile; 7th Baronet; 1678–1743
William Savile; 2nd Marquess of Halifax; 1665–1700	Sir George Savile; 8th Baronet; 1726–1784
Viscountcy, earldom and marquessate extinct	Baronetcy extinct

== See also ==
- Earl of Scarbrough
- Baron Savile
