= William Savile, 2nd Marquess of Halifax =

English Tory politician & peer (1665–1700)

The Most Honourable The Marquess of Halifax
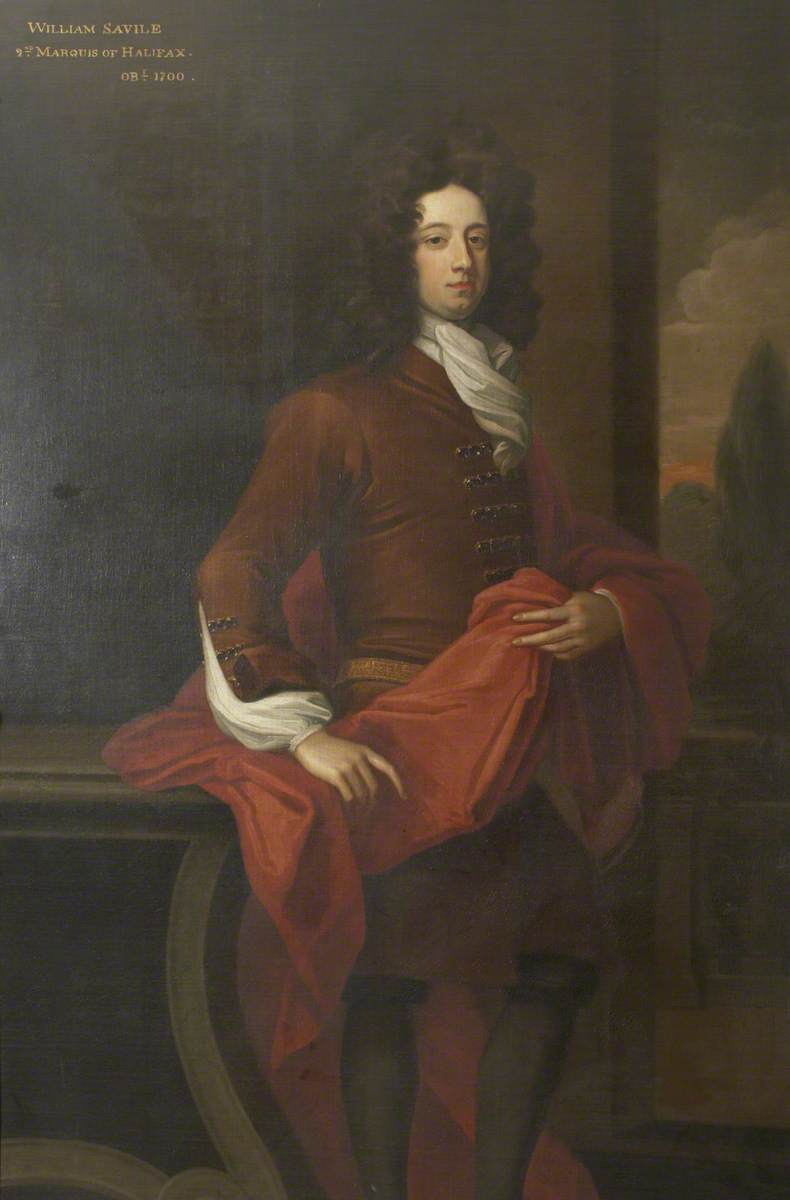

Member of the England Parliament for Newark
- In office 1689–1695 Serving with: Nicholas Saunderson (1689–1693); Sir Francis Molyneux (1693–1695)
- Preceded by: Henry Savile; Philip Darcy
- Succeeded by: Sir George Markham; Sir Francis Molyneux

Personal details
- Born: William Savile; 1665 England
- Died: 31 August 1700 (aged 34–35) England
- Party: Tory
- Spouses: Elizabeth Grimston (m. 1687); Mary Finch (m. 1695)
- Children: Anne Savile; Mary Savile; Dorothy Savile
- Parents: George Savile, 1st Viscount Halifax; Dorothy Spencer
- Education: Christ Church, Oxford

William Savile, 2nd Marquess of Halifax (1665 – 31 August 1700), was the son of George Savile, 1st Viscount Halifax and Dorothy Savile, Viscountess Halifax (née Spencer). He was educated in Geneva in 1677 and matriculated at Christ Church, Oxford, in 1681, but did not take a degree. He travelled on the continent in 1684–1687, returning on his brother's death. From that time, he was known as Lord Elland, from his father's subsidiary title of Baron Savile of Elland.

He was elected Member of Parliament for Newark-on-Trent from 1689 to 1695. He was a Tory and voted in 1689 that the throne was not vacant.

He had four daughters including:

- By his first wife, Elizabeth Grimston, the daughter of Sir Samuel Grimston and Lady Elizabeth Finch, whom he married on 24 November 1687:
  - Lady Anne Savile (1691 – 18 July 1717) who married Charles Bruce, 4th Earl of Elgin (1682–1747)
- By his second wife, Lady Mary Finch, who was the first cousin of his first wife, daughter of Daniel Finch, 7th Earl of Winchilsea, whom he married on 2 April 1695
  - Lady Mary Savile, who in 1722 married Sackville Tufton, 7th Earl of Thanet, and died in 1751
  - Lady Dorothy Savile (1699–1758), who married Richard Boyle, 3rd Earl of Burlington.

He died in 1700, at an early age from "an inward feavour". He died without male issue, so his peerages became extinct, but the baronetcy was inherited by a cousin.

== Sources ==
- Leigh Rayment's Peerage Pages
- Leigh Rayment's Historical List of MPs
- Mark N. Brown, "Savile, George, first marquess of Halifax (1633–1695)", Oxford Dictionary of National Biography, Oxford University Press, Sept 2004; online edn, Oct 2009 , accessed 20 March 2010

Parliament of England
Preceded by Henry Savile; Philip Darcy	Member of Parliament for Newark; 1689–1695; With: Nicholas Saunderson 1689–1693; Sir Francis Molyneux, Bt 1693–1695	Succeeded by Sir George Markham, Bt; Sir Francis Molyneux, Bt
Peerage of England
Preceded by George Savile	Marquess of Halifax; 1695–1700	Extinct
Preceded by George Savile	Earl of Halifax; 1695–1700	Extinct
Preceded by George Savile	Viscount Halifax; 1695–1700	Extinct
Baronetage of England
Preceded by George Savile	Baronet of Thornhill; 1695–1700	Succeeded by John Savile
