= H. C. Foxcroft =

Helen Charlotte Foxcroft (12 December 1865 – 6 July 1950) was an English historian.

Her Life and Letters of George Savile, 1st Marquess of Halifax appeared in 1898. It was favourably reviewed though did not sell well. Despite subsequent editions of Halifax's works by Sir Walter Raleigh (1912) and J. P. Kenyon (1969), Foxcroft's was—in the opinion of Basil Greenslade—not superseded until 1989 upon the publication of Mark N. Brown's edition. In 1902 she published A Supplement to Burnet's History of my Own Time and authored, with T. E. S. Clarke, a biography of Gilbert Burnet.
