= Anne Vaughan, Countess of Carbery =

Anne Vaughan, Countess of Carbery (née Savile; 1663 – c. January 1690), was the daughter of George Savile, 1st Marquess of Halifax, and his first wife, Lady Dorothy Spencer.

On 10 August 1682, she married John Vaughan, 3rd Earl of Carbery, as his second wife. The couple had two children: a son, George Vaughan, who died in 1685 at the age of two, and a daughter, Lady Anne Vaughan, who later married Charles Powlett, 3rd Duke of Bolton.

The countess died following the birth of her daughter and was buried in the churchyard of St Andrew Holborn.
