= Carmarthenshire County Museum =

Local museum in Wales

- Amgueddfa Sir Gaerfyrddin
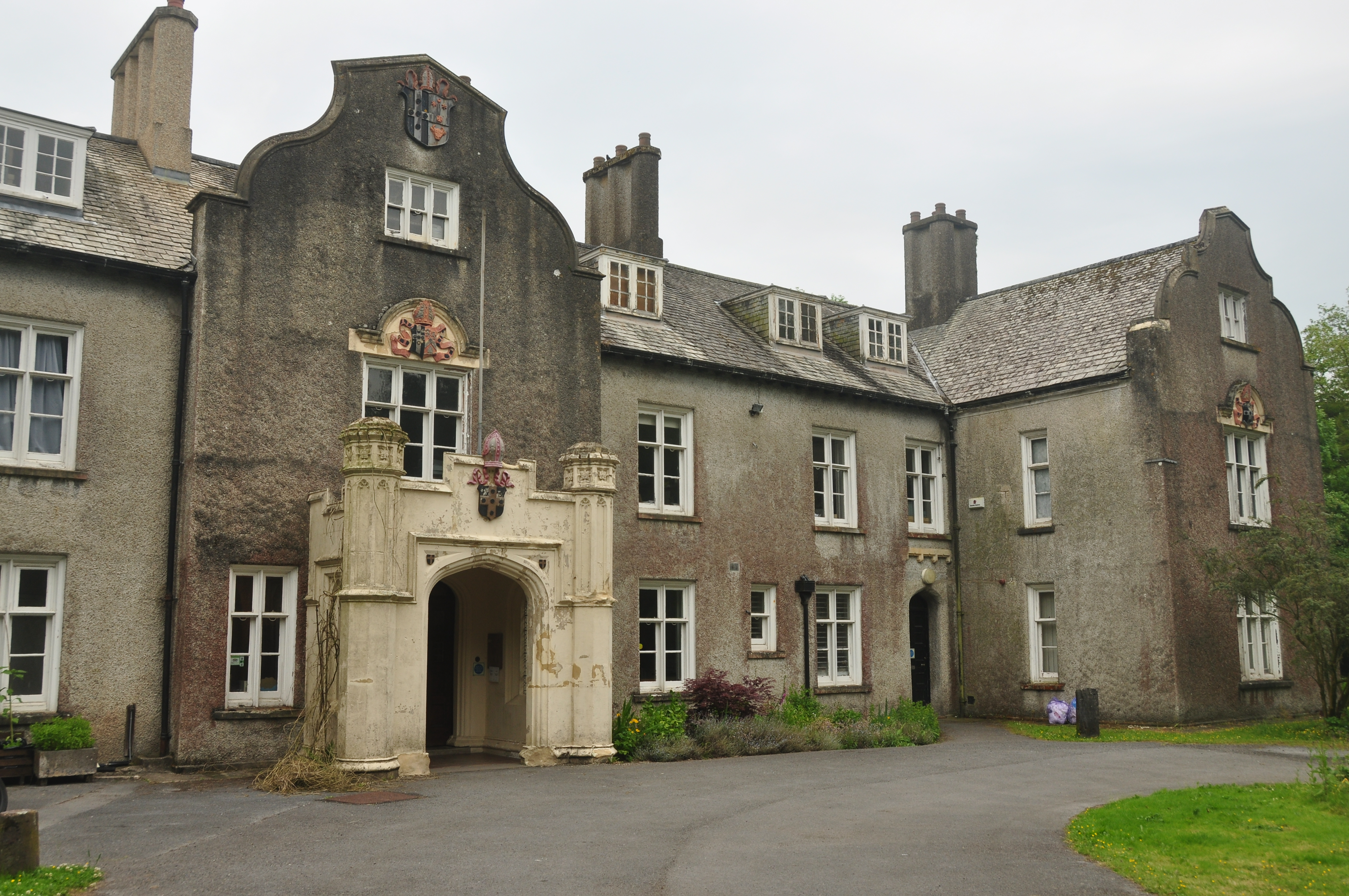
- Exterior view of the Carmarthenshire County Museum.

- Location within Carmarthenshire
- Established: 1908
- Location: Abergwili, Carmarthen, Wales, United Kingdom
- Coordinates: 51.8655°N 4.2658°W
- Type: Local Museum
- Visitors: 12,889 (2009)
- Owner: Carmarthenshire County Council
- Parking: On site (no charge)
- Website: Official website

Carmarthenshire County Museum is a museum in the old county town of Carmarthen, Carmarthenshire in Wales.

== Location ==
Carmarthenshire County Museum is located at Abergwili, Carmarthen, SA31 2JG. It is managed by Carmarthenshire County Council.

== History ==
The museum is housed a building that began life as a college of priests, founded in the 1280s, which then became the palace of the Bishop of St Davids between 1542 and 1974. It was here that the New Testament and the Book of Common Prayer were first translated into the Welsh language in 1567 during the episcopate of Bishop Richard Davies.

== Exhibition & Collection ==
The museum's collection includes examples of Welsh furniture and costume, a Victorian era village schoolroom, articles associated with the county's farming and agricultural heritage and an exhibition on World War II's home front.
