= Anne Vaughan, Duchess of Bolton =

English noble (1689–1751)

Her Grace; The Duchess of Bolton
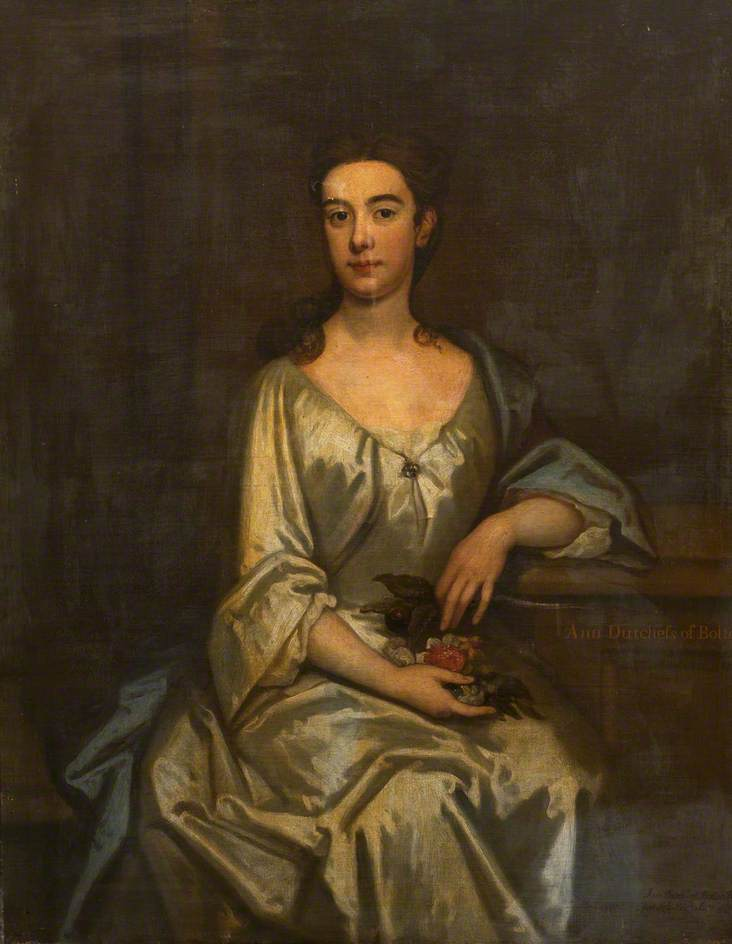
- Born: Anne Vaughan; 1689
- Died: 20 September 1751 (aged 61–62)
- Spouse: Charles Powlett, 3rd Duke of Bolton (m. 1713)
- Parents: John Vaughan, 3rd Earl of Carbery; Anne Savile

Anne Vaughan, Duchess of Bolton (1689 – 20 September 1751), formerly Lady Anne Vaughan, was the wife of Charles Powlett, 3rd Duke of Bolton. Although her married name was Powlett (or Paulet), she is generally known by her maiden name of Vaughan, under which name she was a signatory to Thomas Coram's petition of 1729, which led to the foundation of the Foundling Hospital.

Lady Anne Vaughan was a daughter of John Vaughan, 3rd Earl of Carbery, and his second wife Lady Anne Saville, who died after giving birth to her. On 21 July 1713, she married Charles Powlett or Paulet, son of Charles Paulet, 2nd Duke of Bolton, but the marriage, forced on him by his father, was childless and unhappy. As soon as he succeeded to his father's title, the couple separated. In 1728, the duke began an affair with the actress, Lavinia Fenton, which resulted in three illegitimate sons; he married Lavinia shortly after Anne's death.

It was said of the duchess that "crammed with virtue and good qualities, she thought it impossible not to find gratitude, though she failed to give passion; and upon this she threw away her estate, was despised by her husband and laughed at by the public". She retired from public life, while her husband used her inheritance to fund a lavish lifestyle and support his illegitimate family. From 1731 to her death in 1749, she lived in a newly-built townhouse at 49 Upper Brook Street.

She was only the second of the aristocratic women to sign Coram's petition, and is thought to have encouraged her step-mother-in-law Henrietta, Dowager Duchess of Bolton, who signed three days later. Anne's noted philanthropy made her a good candidate for Coram to approach, since the aristocratic ladies lent their cachet to the project as well as supporting its 'Christian, virtuous and humanitarian aspects'.

As the last of the line of the Vaughans of Golden Grove, Carmarthenshire, she bequeathed the estate to a relative, Richard Vaughan, who was then living at Shenfield in Essex.

Anne's portrait, by Sir Godfrey Kneller, is held by Carmarthenshire County Museum.
