= Dorothy Sidney, Countess of Leicester =

English noble (died 1659)

Dorothy Sidney
- Countess of Leicester; Lady Dorothy Percy
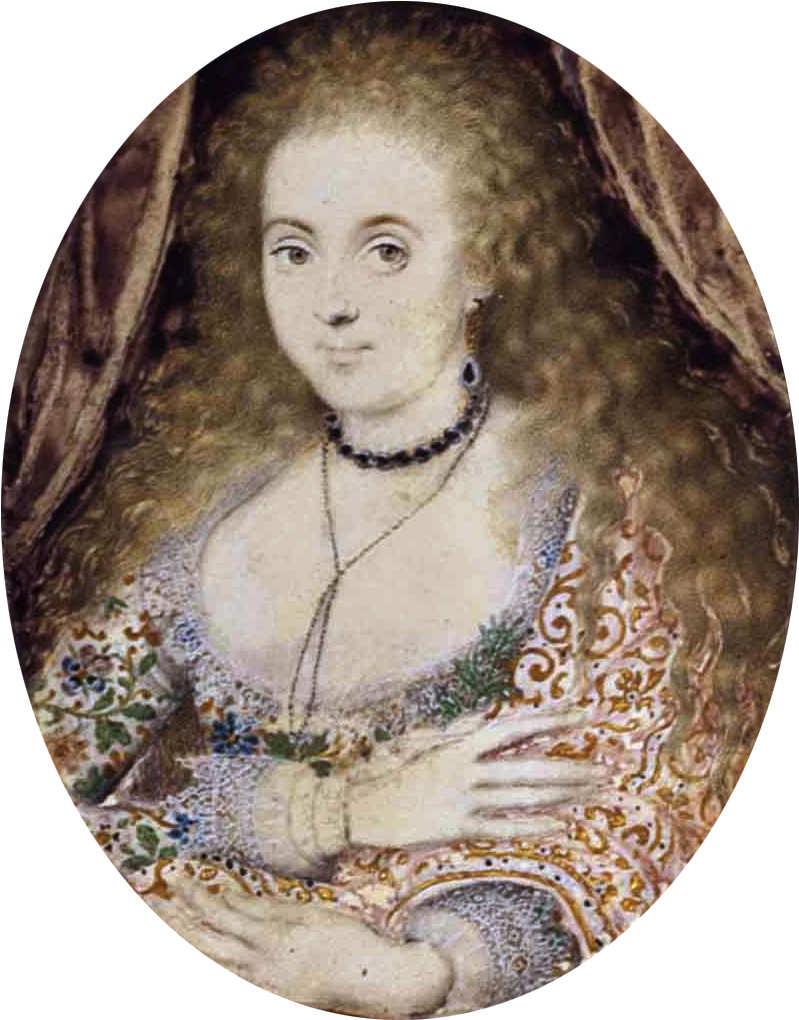
- Dorothy Sidney, by Isaac Oliver
- Born: ca. 1598
- Died: 20 August 1659 (aged 60–61)
- Noble family: Percy
- Spouse: Robert Sidney, 2nd Earl of Leicester (m. 1615)
- Father: Henry Percy, 9th Earl of Northumberland
- Mother: Dorothy Percy, Countess of Northumberland

Dorothy Sidney, Countess of Leicester (née Lady Dorothy Percy; ca. 1598 – 20 August 1659) was an English courtier and letter writer.

== Family background ==
She was the eldest daughter of Henry Percy, 9th Earl of Northumberland, and his wife, Lady Dorothy Devereux. Her sister was the alleged intrigant Lucy Hay, Countess of Carlisle, and their eldest surviving brother was Algernon Percy, 10th Earl of Northumberland.

== Countess of Leicester ==
Lady Dorothy Percy attend the wedding of Princess Elizabeth and Frederick V of the Palatinate in 1613. She married Robert Sidney, later Earl of Leicester, late in 1615 or in 1616. The wedding was held in private, and, according to Lady Anne Clifford, only became openly known towards the end of February 1616.

Her father-in-law, Robert Sidney, 1st Earl of Leicester, mentioned Dorothy's first pregnancy in his letters. Her daughter Dorothy was known as "Doll". The couple had twelve children, including:

- Dorothy Spencer, Countess of Sunderland (1617–1683), who married Henry Spencer, 1st Earl of Sunderland. Her parents had tried to arrange for her to marry William Cavendish, 3rd Earl of Devonshire.
- Philip Sidney, 3rd Earl of Leicester (1619–1697), who married Catherine Cecil.
- Robert Sidney, (1620–1622).
- Henry Sidney, (1621–1622).
- Algernon Sidney
- Lucy Sidney (1625–1685), married Sir John Pelham, 3rd Baronet
- Henry Sydney, 1st Earl of Romney

She rehearsed for a masque of nine ladies at court, The Masque of Amazons, with her sister, Lucy, Lady Hay, for January 1618, but King James and Anne of Denmark decided against holding the performance. In January 1619, she was ill with smallpox.

Her father-in-law, Robert Sidney, was chamberlain to Anne of Denmark. He organised the funeral of Anne of Denmark in 1619, and Dorothy attended, walking in procession behind Prince Charles.

=== Cipher in letters ===
From 1623, Dorothy resided at Penshurst Place. When her father-in-law died in July 1626, she became Countess of Leicester. Her husband, Robert Sidney, Earl of Leicester, became the English ambassador in Paris in 1636. Dorothy wrote letters to him, and asked him to send her a cipher code so that she could express herself more freely. She asked that only names were to be given a cipher, as more could be "very troublesome". In subsequent letters Lucy, Countess of Carlisle, became "154" and the Earl of Holland was "142". The numbers used were changed from time to time. Robert Sidney noted his decipher in some of her letters, and may have worked through the letters curating them after her death.

=== Jewel ===
Elizabeth Stuart, a daughter of Charles I, stayed at Penshurst in 1649. She left a diamond jewel with the Earl and Countess. It was shaped like a pansy flower with four great diamonds as petals, encircled with lesser stones, and enamelled on the back. The trustees appointed for the sale of the late king's goods demanded its surrender. The jewel remained at Penshurst and was bequeathed to their son Henry.

== Leicester House and Penshurst ==
The Countess took charge of finishing building works at Leicester House in London and wrote letters detailing her progress and plans to her husband, who was serving as ambassador in France. In September 1636, she wrote that the great chamber, the anteroom and stair were "handsomely fretted after a new way" at a cost of £80 including a new mantlepiece in the great chamber. She had engaged a painter to paint and gild the woodwork and cornices, and the external railing on the roof and a balcony. She had ordered gilt leather for the walls of the stair and the anteroom. She thought the work would exceed their budget. In January 1637, the smith who made the balcony railings and a timber merchant made demands for payment.

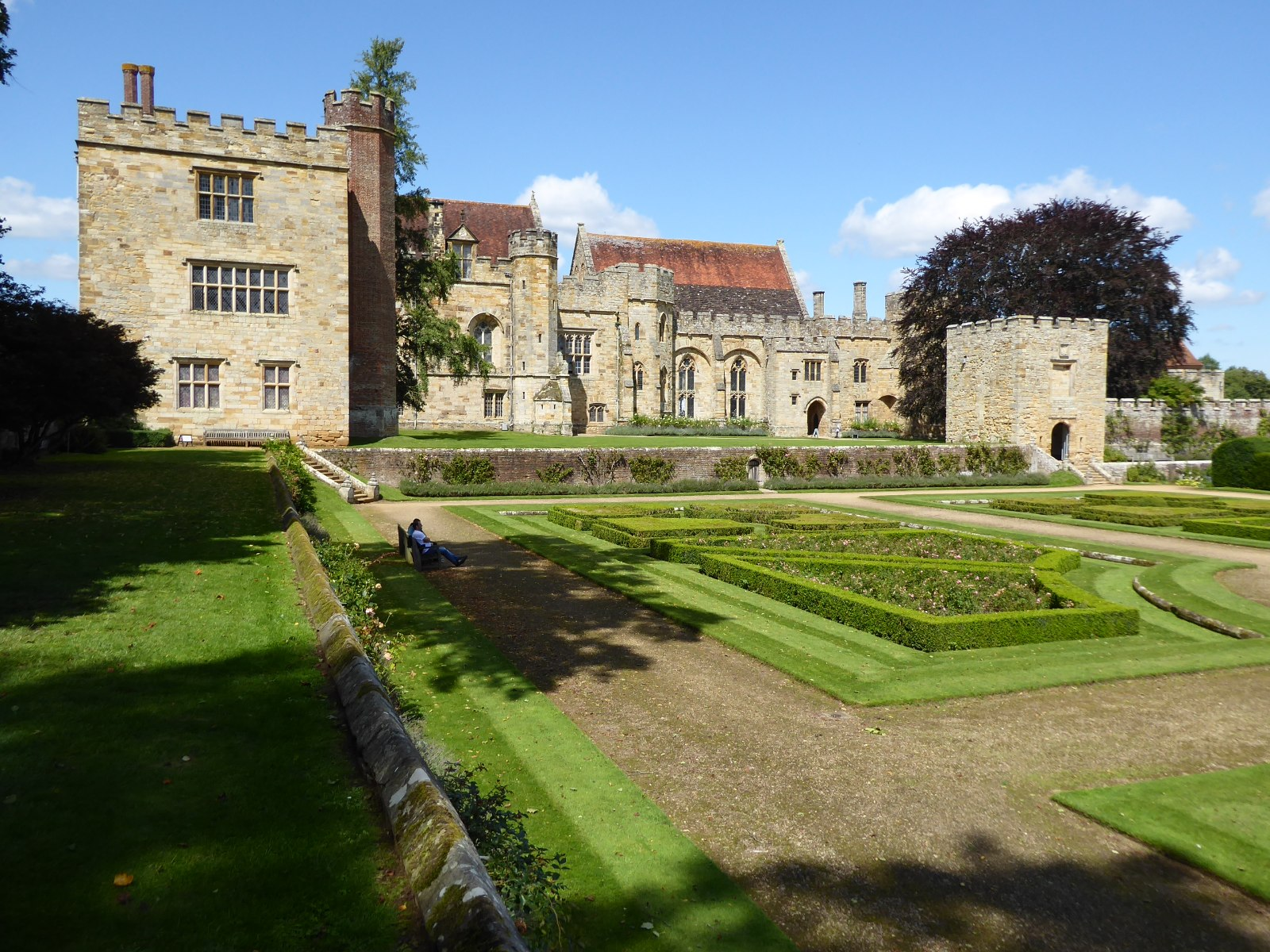
Penshurst Place

In February 1637, she assured the Earl that money allocated for finishing the house would be "employed with my best judgement". The source of the income was the sale of timber on the Penshurst estate to Henry Crickendall. She hoped to buy a good secondhand bed from the Saint-Germain's fair in Paris and have another made up from her own materials. She wanted to get some crimson or blue "watchet" velvet like that on a French bed belonging to Henrietta Maria. She also wanted a dozen small paintings of ladies. Such suites of portraits are sometimes known as "galleries of beauties".

In January 1638, she asked the Earl to get a bed suite made up in France using some yellow silk damask that he had bought, "where it would be better done" than in London. Some of their older unfashionable beds at Penshurst had attracted adverse comment from strangers. A project to make a new bed using the lace from footmen's livery would cost at least £100.

The Countess was regarded as an expert in the furnishings of beds, and while she was in Paris in 1639 was involved in the bespeaking of beds and curtains provided for Thomas Wentworth, 1st Earl of Strafford as Lord Deputy of Ireland. She recommended that Ralph Grynder's workshop in London supply the woodwork of the beds and the matching suites of chairs and stools. Her sister, Lucy, Countess of Carlisle, who had organised the commission for Wentworth's beds, asked for a hungerlin (a short robe) of "silver stuff or flowered stuff", and then a petticoat and bodice of green satin made in the same fashion as that worn by her daughter Dorothy, Lady Spencer, in a portrait recently sent to England.

The Countess of Leicester sent her husband an account of the Penshurst timber sales in December 1638. She had organised repairs at Penshurst, to the suites known as Leicester's Lodging and the King's Lodging. She intended to sack the park keeper, who was negligent and poachers frequented the deer park at Penshurst. Dorothy employed his brother-in-law instead.
