= Dorothy Savile, Viscountess Halifax =

The Right Honourable; The Viscountess Halifax
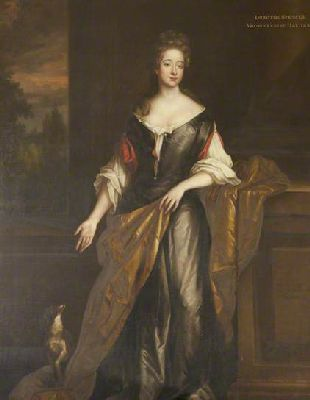
- Lady Dorothy, Marchioness of Halifax, by Jan van der Vaart
- Born: Dorothy Spencer; 1640
- Died: 16 December 1670 (aged 29–30)
- Spouse: George Savile, 1st Viscount Halifax (m. 1656)
- Issue: William Savile, 2nd Marquess of Halifax; Anne Savile
- Parents: Henry Spencer, 1st Earl of Sunderland; Dorothy Sidney

Dorothy Savile, Viscountess Halifax (née Spencer; 1640 – 16 December 1670) was the first wife of George Savile, 1st Viscount Halifax (later 1st Marquess of Halifax), and the mother of the 2nd Marquess.

Dorothy was the daughter of Henry Spencer, 1st Earl of Sunderland, and his wife, the former Lady Dorothy Sidney (or Sydney).

Lady Dorothy married George Savile on 29 December 1656, at St Giles in the Fields in London. They had two children:

- William Savile, 2nd Marquess of Halifax
- Anne Savile, later Countess of Carbery (c.1663-1690)

In 1667, George Savile was created Viscount Halifax. Following his wife's death, he remarried, in 1672, his second wife being Gertrude Pierrepont, daughter of William Pierrepont of Thoresby. His elevation to the title of Marquess of Halifax came in 1682, some years after Dorothy's death.
