= Dorothy Spencer, Countess of Sunderland =

English noblewoman (1617–1684)

Dorothy Spencer
- Countess of Sunderland
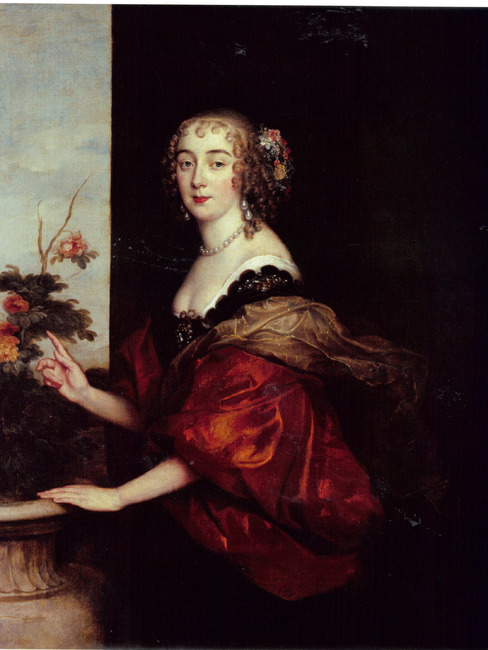
- Portrait of Dorothy, Countess of Sunderland (Anthony van Dyck)
- Born: Lady Dorothy Sidney; 5 October 1617; Brentford, London Borough of Hounslow, Greater London, England
- Died: 5 February 1684 (aged 66); Isleworth, London Borough of Hounslow, Greater London, England
- Buried: Everdon, Northamptonshire
- Noble family: Sidney (by birth); Spencer (by marriage)
- Spouses: Henry Spencer, 1st Earl of Sunderland (m. 1639; died 1643) Sir Robert Smythe (m. 1652)
- Issue: Dorothy Saville, Viscountess Halifax; Robert Spencer, 2nd Earl of Sunderland; Lady Penelope Spencer; Robert Smythe
- Father: Robert Sidney, 2nd Earl of Leicester
- Mother: Lady Dorothy Percy

Dorothy Spencer (née Sidney; later Smythe), Countess of Sunderland (5 October 1617 (baptised) – 5 February 1684), was the wife of Henry Spencer, 1st Earl of Sunderland, and the daughter of Robert Sidney, 2nd Earl of Leicester, and Lady Dorothy Percy.

== Career ==
As a child, her parents called her "Doll". Lady Dorothy Sidney (or Sydney) was celebrated not only for her beauty but for wit, charm and intelligence. In about 1635, she rejected a marriage proposal from the poet Edmund Waller, who addressed verses to her under the nickname "Sacharissa" (which he based on the Latin word sacharum, meaning "sugar"). Her parents tried to arrange for her to marry William Cavendish, 3rd Earl of Devonshire.

On 20 July 1639 at Penhurst, she married Henry Spencer. It seems to have been a love marriage and had her family's wholehearted approval: her father after her husband's death wrote that he thanked God for the part he had played in her happiness. In 1643, Spencer was created 1st Earl of Sunderland in recognition of his service to King Charles I in the English Civil War. Spencer was killed at the First Battle of Newbury, leaving Dorothy with two children, and pregnant with a third, who died young. Their children were:

- Lady Dorothy Spencer married George Savile, 1st Viscount Halifax (later 1st Marquess of Halifax)
- Robert Spencer, 2nd Earl of Sunderland
- Lady Penelope Spencer (c. 1642–1667), died unmarried.

The widowed countess lived at Brington, Northamptonshire, but eventually returned to Penshurst Place in Kent to live with her parents. In 1652 she remarried to Sir Robert Smythe of Bidborough, Kent, and had a second son, also named Robert.

Her letters show both her intelligence and her clear-sightedness, even about those closest to her. While her son and daughter-in-law could see no fault in their eldest son, Robert, Lord Spencer, Dorothy wrote dryly of her grandson: "He has no good nature or humour, is scornful and pretending… comes to me seldom, seems weary in a minute, talks of my company [guests] as though I picked them up in the streets…".

Her death has been attributed to the grief caused by her brother Algernon's trial and execution for treason in December 1683. Her grave is in Everdon, Northamptonshire.

== Bibliography ==
- Sacharissa; some account of Dorothy Sidney, Countess of Sunderland, her family and friends, 1617-1684 by Julia Mary Cartwright Ady (1926)
- Kenyon, J.P. Robert Spencer Earl of Sunderland 1741-1702 Longman Green and Co. 1958 Reprinted by Gregg Revivals 1992
