= George Savile, 1st Marquess of Halifax =

English statesman and writer (1633–1695)

The Most Honourable The Marquess of Halifax PC DL FRS
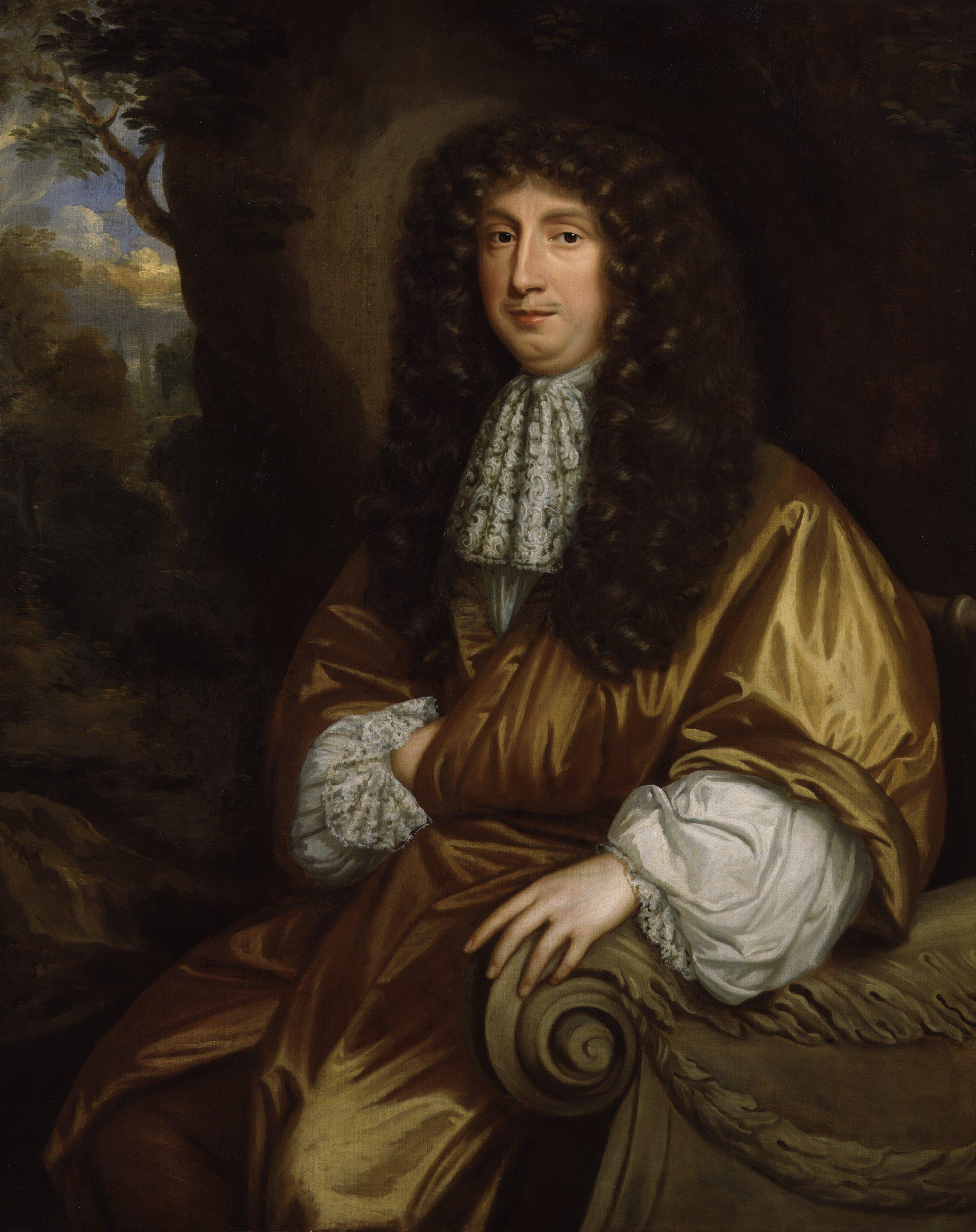
- George Savile, Marquess of Halifax, by Mary Beale, c. 1674–1676

Lord President of the Council
- In office 18 February – 4 December 1685
- Monarch: James II
- Preceded by: The Earl of Rochester
- Succeeded by: The Earl of Sunderland

Personal details
- Born: George Savile; 11 November 1633 Thornhill, West Riding of Yorkshire, England
- Died: 5 April 1695 (aged 61)
- Resting place: Westminster Abbey, London, England
- Spouses: Dorothy Spencer (m. 1656; died 1670); Gertrude Pierrepont (m. 1672)
- Children: William Savile; Anne Vaughan, Countess of Carbery; Lady Elizabeth Savile; Henry Savile
- Parents: Sir William Savile; Anne Coventry

George Savile, 1st Marquess of Halifax, PC, DL, FRS (11 November 1633 – 5 April 1695) was an English statesman and writer. He sat in the House of Commons of England in 1660 before being elevated to the House of Lords in 1668.

== Background and early life, 1633–1667 ==
Savile was born in Thornhill, in the West Riding of Yorkshire. He was the eldest son of Sir William Savile, 3rd Baronet, and his wife, Anne Coventry. Anne was the eldest daughter of Lord Keeper Thomas Coventry, 1st Baron Coventry. His father distinguished himself as a Royalist in the English Civil War and would die in 1644. Savile was also the nephew of Sir William Coventry, who is said to have influenced his political opinions, and of Lord Shaftesbury, afterwards his most bitter opponent, and great-nephew of the Earl of Strafford. He was the great-grandson of Sir George Savile of Lupset and Thornhill (created baronet in 1611).

Savile was educated at Shrewsbury School in 1643 while his mother was staying with her sister in Shropshire. He later travelled in France, where he attended a Huguenot academy in Paris; stayed in Angers and Orléans; and visited Italy and the Netherlands; and is believed to have studied in Geneva. He returned to England by 1652.

In 1660, Savile was elected Member of Parliament for Pontefract in the Convention Parliament, marking his only appearance in the Lower House. In the same year, he was made Deputy Lieutenant for the county of Yorkshire and Colonel of a foot regiment in the Yorkshire Militia.

In 1665, the Duke of York sought a peerage for Savile, but his request was successfully opposed by Clarendon, on the grounds of Savile's "ill-reputation amongst men of piety and religion." Clarendon's true motives may have stemmed from Savile's connections with Buckingham and Coventry. However, the honours were only deferred for a short time and were granted after Clarendon's fall on 31 December 1667, when Savile was created Baron Savile of Elland and Viscount Halifax.

In 1667, he commanded a troop of the North Riding Militia Horse during the Dutch raids, and was commissioned to raise a troop in Yorkshire for Prince Rupert's Regiment of Horse.

== Political career, 1668–1680 ==
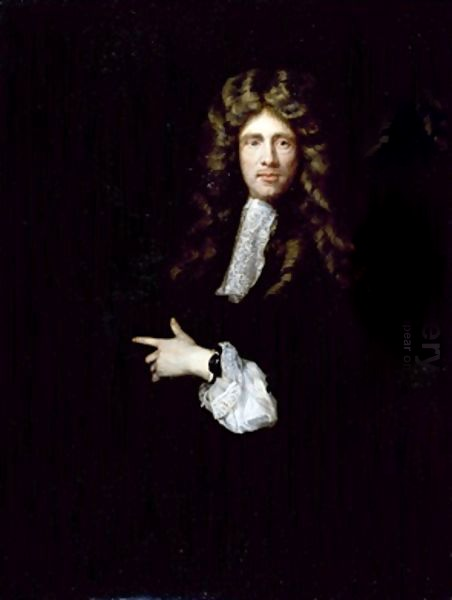
Halifax by Claude Lefèbvre

Halifax supported the anti-French policy formulated in the Triple Alliance of January 1668. He was created a privy councillor in 1672, and, while it is believed that he was ignorant of the secret clauses in the Treaty of Dover, was chosen as envoy to negotiate terms of peace with Louis XIV and the Dutch at Utrecht. His mission was further deprived of importance by Arlington and Buckingham (who were in the king's counsels), who anticipated his arrival and took the negotiations out of his hands. Though he signed the compact, Halifax denied involvement in the harsh terms imposed on the Dutch, and henceforth became a bitter opponent to the policy of subservience to French interests and of the Roman Catholic claims.

=== Test Act and the Catholic Question, 1673–1678 ===
Halifax took an active part in Parliament's passage of the Test Act of 1673, and thereby forfeited his friendship with James. In 1674, he brought forward a motion for disarming "popish recusants," and supported one by Lord Carlisle for restricting the marriages in the royal family to Protestants; but he opposed the bill introduced by Lord Danby in 1675, that imposed a test oath on officials and members of parliament, speaking "with that quickness, learning and elegance that are inseparable from all his discourses," and ridiculing the multiplication of oaths, since "no man would ever sleep with open doors... should all the town be sworn not to rob." He was now on bad terms with Danby.

He was elected a Fellow of the Royal Society in November 1675.

In 1678, he took an active part in the investigation into the "Popish Plot," to which he appears to have given excessive credence, but opposed the bill that was passed on 30 October 1678, to exclude Roman Catholics from the House of Lords.

=== Privy Councillor, 1679–1680 ===
In 1679, after Danby's fall from grace, Halifax became a member of the newly constituted privy council. With Charles, who had at first "kicked at his appointment," he quickly became a favourite, his lively and "libertine" conversation being named by Bishop Gilbert Burnet as his chief attraction for the king. His dislike of the Duke of York and of the crypto-Catholic tendencies of the court did not induce him to support the rash attempt by Lord Shaftesbury to substitute the illegitimate Duke of Monmouth for James in the succession. He feared Shaftesbury's ascendancy in the national councils and foresaw nothing but civil war and confusion as a result of his scheme. He declared against the exclusion of James, was made an earl in 1679, and was one of the "Triumvirate" which now directed public affairs. He assisted in passing into law the Habeas Corpus Act. According to Sir William Temple, he showed great severity in putting the laws against the Roman Catholics into force, although in 1680 he voted against the execution of Lord Stafford.

== The Trimmer, 1680–1682 ==
Halifax's policy had been wholly and successfully directed towards uniting all parties with the object of frustrating Shaftesbury's plans. He opened communications with the Prince of Orange, and the king's illness called for summoning James from Brussels. Monmouth was compelled to retire to Holland, and Shaftesbury was dismissed. On the other hand, while Halifax was so far successful, James was given an opportunity of establishing a new influence at the court. It was with great difficulty that his retirement to Scotland was at last effected; the ministers lost the confidence and support of the "country party," and Halifax, fatigued and ill at the close of this year, retired to his family home at Rufford Abbey.

He returned in September 1680, on the occasion of the introduction of the Exclusion Bill in the Lords. The debate that followed, one of the most famous in the annals of parliament, became a duel of oratory between Halifax and his uncle Shaftesbury, the finest two speakers of the day, watched by the Lords, the Commons at the bar, and the king. It lasted seven hours. Halifax spoke sixteen times, and at last, regardless of the menaces of the more violent supporters of the bill who closed round him, vanquished his opponent. The rejection of the bill by a majority of 33 was attributed by all parties entirely to the eloquence of Halifax. His conduct transformed the allegiance to him of the Whigs into bitter hostility, the Commons immediately petitioning the king to remove him from his councils forever, while any favour which he might have regained with James was forfeited by his subsequent approval of the regency scheme.

Halifax retired to Rufford again in January 1681, but was present at the Oxford Parliament, and in May he returned to public life, holding chief control of affairs for a year. Shaftesbury's arrest on 2 July was attributed to his influence, but in general, during the period of Tory reaction, he seems to have urged a policy of conciliation and moderation to the king. He opposed James's return from Scotland and, about this time (September), made a characteristic but futile attempt to persuade the Duke to attend the services of the Church of England and thus to end all difficulties.

He renewed relations with the Prince of Orange, who in July paid a visit to England to seek support against the French designs upon Luxembourg. The influence of Halifax procured for the Dutch a formal assurance from Charles of his support, but the king informed the French ambassador that he had no intention of fulfilling his engagements, and made another secret treaty with Louis. In 1682, Halifax opposed James's prosecution of the Earl of Argyll, arousing further hostility in the duke, while the same year he was challenged to a duel by Monmouth, who attributed to him his disgrace.

== Withdrawal from politics, 1682–1689 ==
Halifax's short tenure of power ended with the return of James in May. Outwardly, he still retained the king's favour and was advanced to a marquessate in August, and to the office of Lord Privy Seal in October. As he was still a member of the administration, he must share responsibility for the attack now made upon the municipal franchises, especially as the new charters passed his office. In January 1684, he was one of the commissioners "who supervise all things concerning the city and have turned out those persons who are whiggishly inclined." He made honourable but vain endeavours to save Algernon Sidney and Lord Russell. "My Lord Halifax," declared Tillotson, in his evidence before the later inquiry, "showed a very compassionate concern for my Lord Russell and all the readiness to serve them that could be wished." The Rye House Plot, in which it was sought to implicate them, was a disastrous blow to his policy, and in order to counteract its consequences, he entered into somewhat perilous negotiations with Monmouth and endeavoured to effect his reconciliation with the king.

On 12 February 1684, he procured the release of his old antagonist, Lord Danby. Shortly afterwards, his influence at the court revived. Charles was no longer in receipt of his French pension and was beginning to tire of James and Rochester. The latter, instead of becoming lord treasurer, was, according to the epigram of Halifax which has become proverbial, "kicked upstairs," to the office of Lord President of the Council. Halifax then worked to establish better relations between Charles and the Prince of Orange, and opposed the abrogation of the recusancy laws. In a debate in the cabinet of November 1684, on the question of the grant of a fresh constitution to the New England colonies, he urged with great warmth "that there could be no doubt whatever but that the same laws which are in force in England should also be established in a country inhabited by Englishmen and that an absolute government is neither so happy nor so safe as that which is tempered by laws and which sets bounds to the authority of the prince," and declared that he could not "live under a king who should have it in his power to take, whenever he thought proper, the money he has in his pocket." The opinions thus expressed were opposed by all the other ministers and highly censured by Louis XIV, James and Judge George Jeffreys.

=== Opposition to James II, 1685–1688 ===
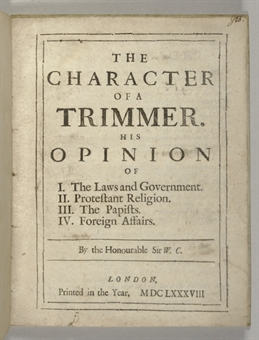
Title page of The Character of a Trimmer, composed by Halifax beginning in early 1685, but not published until April 1688. The title page attributed the book to the recently deceased Sir William Coventry, but Halifax was its true author.

At James's accession, Halifax was deprived of much of his power and relegated to the presidency of the council. He showed no compliance with James's preferences. He was opposed to the parliamentary grant to the king of a revenue for life, he promoted the treaty of alliance with the Dutch in August 1685, and he expostulated with the king on the subject of the illegal commissions in the army given to Roman Catholics.

Finally, on his firm refusal to support the repeal of the Test and Habeas Corpus Acts, he was dismissed, and his name was struck out of the list of the privy council. He corresponded with the Prince of Orange, conferred with Dykveldt, the latter's envoy, but held aloof from plans which aimed at the prince's personal interference in English affairs. In 1687 he published the famous Letter to a Dissenter, in which he warns the Nonconformists against being beguiled by the "Indulgence" into joining the court party, sets in a clear light the fatal results of such a step, and reminds them that under their next sovereign their grievances would in all probability be satisfied by the law.

The tract was influential and widely read. 20,000 copies were circulated through the kingdom, and a great party were convinced of the wisdom of remaining faithful to the national traditions and liberties. He took the popular side on the occasion of the trial of the Seven Bishops in June 1688, visited them in the Tower, and led the cheers with which the verdict of "not guilty" was received in court; but the same month he refrained from signing the Invitation to William, and publicly repudiated any share in the prince's plans. On the contrary, he attended the court and refused any credence to the report that the king's newborn son, James, Prince of Wales, was supposititious.

=== The Revolution of 1688 ===
After William's landing in southwest England, Halifax was present at the council called by James on 27 November 1688. He urged the king to grant large concessions. He accepted the mission with Nottingham and Godolphin to treat with William at Hungerford and succeeded in obtaining moderate terms from the prince. The negotiations were abortive, for James had resolved on flight. In the crisis that ensued, when the country was left without a government, Halifax took the lead. He presided over the council of Lords, which assembled and took immediate measures to maintain public order.

On the return of James to London on 16 December 1688, after his capture at Faversham, Halifax repaired to William's camp and henceforth attached himself unremittingly to his cause. On 17 December 1688, he carried with Lords Delamere and Shrewsbury a message from William to the king advising his departure from London, and, after the king's second flight, directed the proceedings of the executive. On the meeting of the convention on 22 January 1689, he was formally elected speaker of the House of Lords. He voted against the motion for a regency, which was only defeated by two votes. The moderate and comprehensive character of the settlement at the revolution plainly shows his guiding hand, and it was through his persuasion that the Lords yielded to the Commons and agreed to the compromise whereby William and Mary were declared joint sovereigns. On 13 February 1689, in the Banqueting House at Whitehall, he tendered the crown to them in the name of the nation and conducted the proclamation of their accession in the city.

== Return to power, 1689–1695 ==
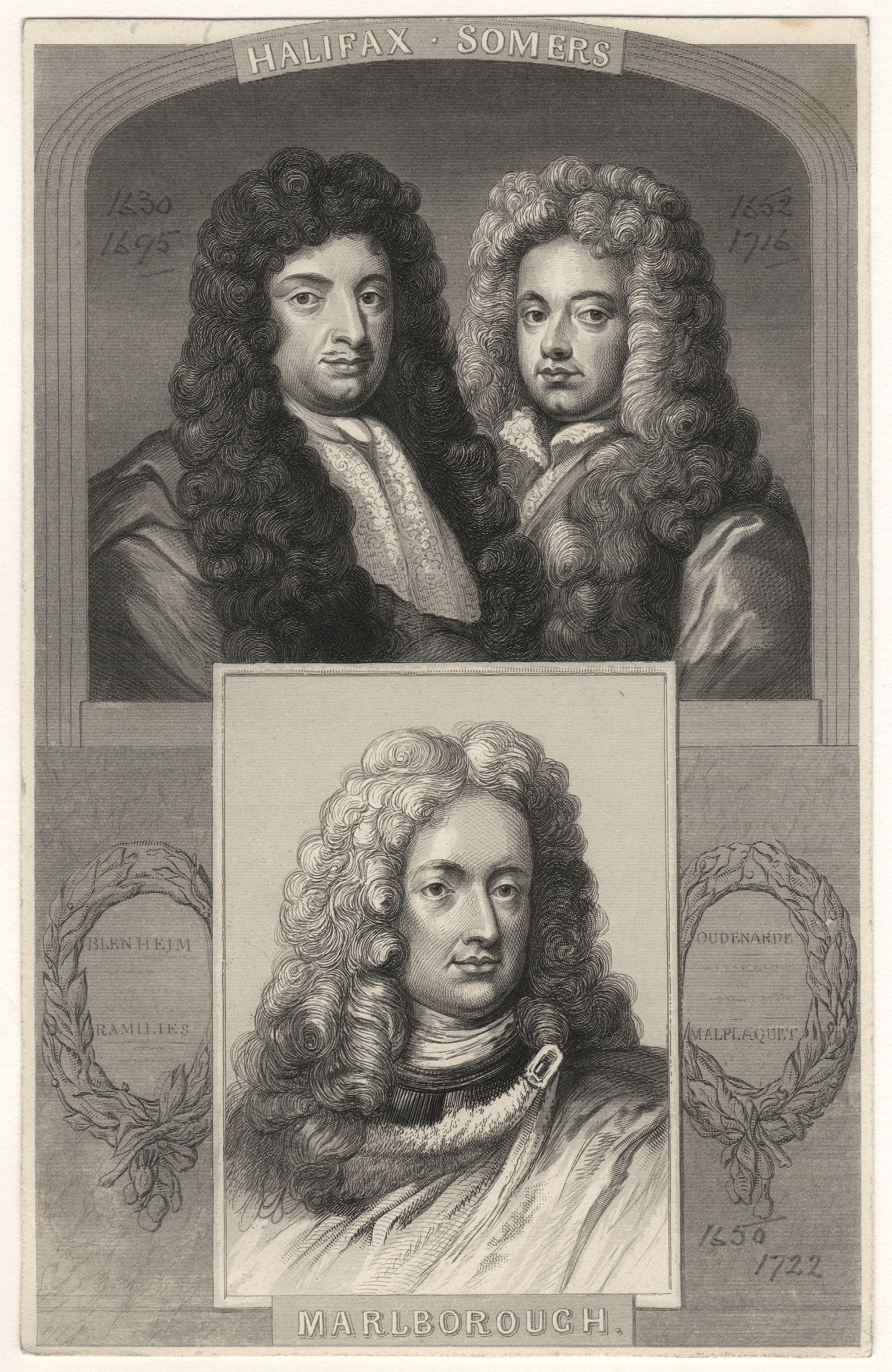
The Marquess of Halifax during his time as William III's Lord Privy Seal, pictured with John Somers, 1st Baron Somers (Lord Chancellor) and John Churchill, 1st Duke of Marlborough (Commander-in-Chief of the Forces).

At the opening of the new reign, Halifax had considerable influence, was made Lord Privy Seal while Danby, his rival, was obliged to content himself with the presidency of the council, and controlled the appointments to the new cabinet which were made on a "trimming" or comprehensive basis. His views on religious toleration were as wide as those of the new king. He championed the claims of the Nonconformists as against the High Church party, and he was bitterly disappointed at the miscarriage of the Comprehension Bill. He thoroughly approved at first of William's foreign policy; but, having excited the hostility of both the Whig and Tory parties, he now became exposed to a series of attacks in parliament which finally drove him from power.

He was severely censured for the disorder in Ireland, and an attempt was made to impeach him for his conduct with regard to the sentences on the Whig leaders. The inquiry resulted in his favour; but notwithstanding, and in spite of the king's continued support, he determined to retire. He had already resigned the speakership of the House of Lords, and on 8 February 1690, quit his place in the cabinet. He still nominally retained his seat in the privy council, but in parliament he became a bitter critic of the administration; the rivalry of Halifax (the Black Marquess) with Danby, now Marquess of Carmarthen (the White Marquess) threw the former at this time into determined opposition. He disapproved of William's total absorption in European politics and his open partiality for his countrymen.

In January 1691, Halifax had an interview with Henry Bulkeley, the Jacobite agent, and is said to have promised "to do everything that lay in his power to serve the king." This was probably merely a measure of precaution, for he had no serious Jacobite leanings. He entered bail for Lord Marlborough when he was accused of complicity in a Jacobite plot in May 1692, and in June, during the absence of the king from England, his name was struck off the privy council.

Halifax spoke in favour of the Triennial Bill (12 January 1693), which passed the legislature but was vetoed by William, suggested a proviso in a renewed Licensing of the Press Act, which restricted its operation to anonymous works, and approved the Place Bill (1694). He opposed, probably on account of the large sums he had engaged in the traffic of annuities, the establishment of the Bank of England in 1694. Early in 1695, he delivered a strong attack on the administration in the House of Lords.

After a short illness arising from a rupture caused by vomiting after eating undercooked chicken, he died on 5 April 1695, at the age of sixty-one. He was buried in Henry VII's chapel in Westminster Abbey.

== Family ==
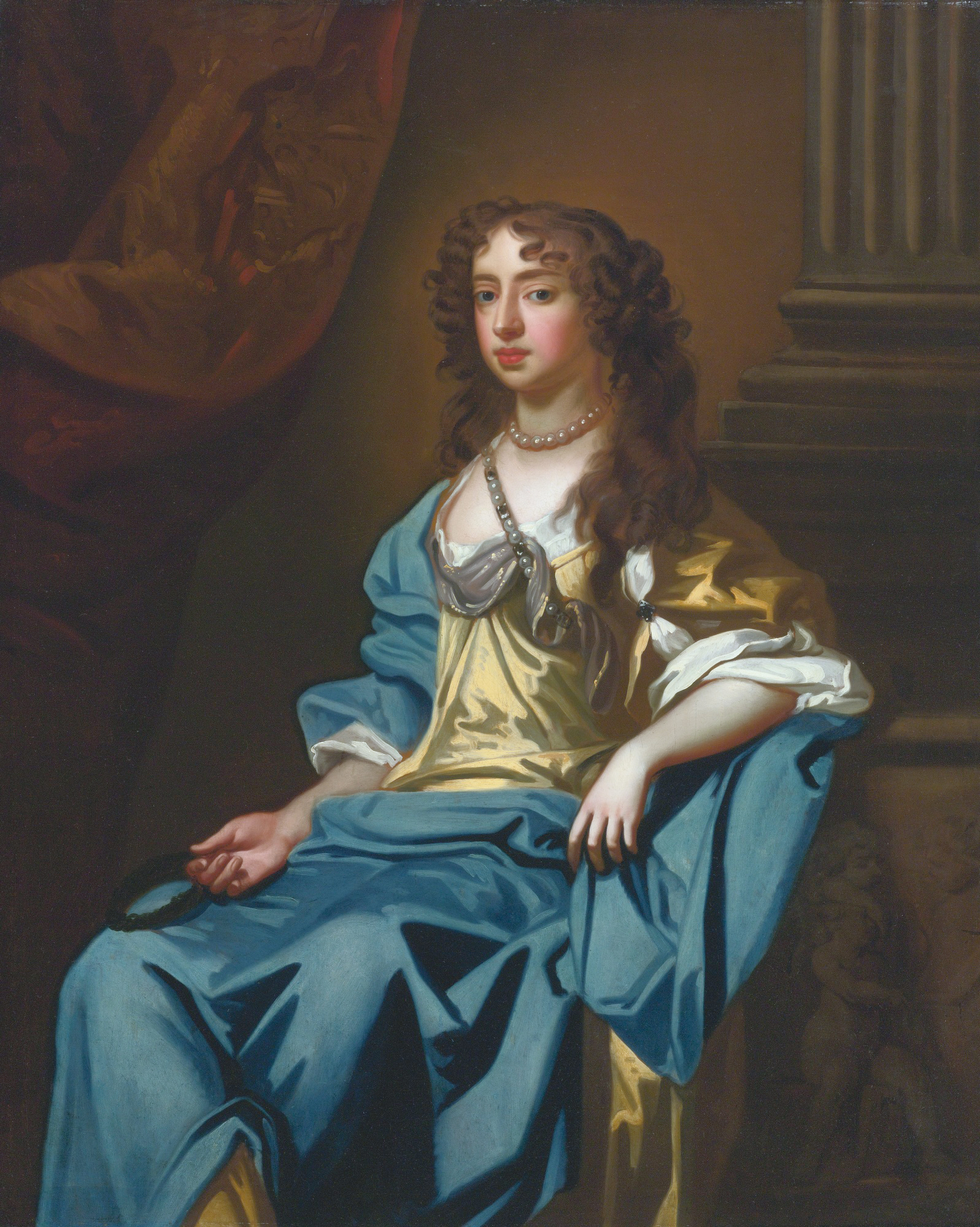
His second wife Gertrude, by the studio of Sir Peter Lely

In 1656, he married the Lady Dorothy Spencer, daughter of Henry Spencer, 1st Earl of Sunderland, and his wife Dorothy Sidney ("Sacharissa"), leaving a family including Lady Anne Savile (1663 – c. January 1690) and William Savile, 2nd Marquess of Halifax (1665 – 31 August 1700). By his marriage with Dorothy Spencer, he was brother-in-law to Lord Sunderland; despite the family tie, the two men were bitter and lifelong political opponents.

Dorothy died in 1670, and Savile married again in 1672, to Gertrude Pierrepont, daughter of William Pierrepont of Thoresby. They had one daughter, Lady Elizabeth Savile, who inherited a considerable portion of her father's intellectual abilities. Gertrude survived him.

His eldest son, Henry Savile, Lord Elland, following four years of negotiations, was married to the daughter of the French Huguenot Esther de la Tour du Pin, marquise de Gouvernet. The dowry was £25,000, but Henry soon died. It was his second son, William, who succeeded to his peerage. On the death of the latter, in August 1700 without male issue, the peerage became extinct, and the baronetcy passed to the Saviles of Lupset, the whole male line of the Savile family ending in the person of Sir George Savile, 8th baronet, in 1784. Henry Savile, British envoy at Versailles, who died unmarried in 1687, was a younger brother of the first marquess. Halifax was rumoured to have been the father of the illegitimate poet Henry Carey, though this is unconfirmed.

== Legacy ==
=== "Trimmer" ===
Halifax left a legacy as an influential orator and writer, noted in his time for his intelligence, integrity, refined manners, and wit. His deliberate detachment from the dominant political factions of the period led to frustration among party leaders, but also underscored his independent stance.

Halifax was sometimes viewed by his contemporaries as indecisive or unreliable. However, his political approach was primarily guided by the principle of compromise, which set him apart from both major parties and led to shifts in his alignment over time. For example, although he had supported the regency scheme during the reign of Charles II, he opposed it during the Glorious Revolution, a position consistent with his broader political principles.

He readily accepted for himself the character of a "trimmer," desiring, he said, to keep the boat steady, while others attempted to weigh it down perilously on one side or the other; and he concluded his tract with these assertions: 'that our climate is a Trimmer between that part of the world where men are roasted and the other where they are frozen; that our Church is a Trimmer between the frenzy of fanatic visions and the lethargic ignorance of Popish dreams; that our laws are Trimmers between the excesses of unbounded power and the extravagance of liberty not enough restrained; that true virtue hath ever been thought a Trimmer, and to have its dwelling in the middle between two extremes; that even God Almighty Himself is divided between His two great attributes, His Mercy and His Justice. In such company, our Trimmer is not ashamed of his name. . . ."

=== Intellectual ===
Halifax advocated for universal education in basic subjects such as reading, writing, and arithmetic, funded by the state. His writings on the constitutional relationship between Britain and its colonies have been described as inconsistent. Some commentators regard him as a principled and intellectually gifted political theorist, though less effective in practical governance. Lambasting abstract political dogma, Halifax nevertheless did not venture further than to think that "men should live in some competent state of freedom," and that the limited monarchical and aristocratic government was the best adapted for his country.

In The Rough Draft of a New Model at Sea, Halifax wrote: 'Circumstances, must come in and are to be made a part of the matter of which we are to judge; positive decisions are always dangerous, more especially in politics." Nor was he the mere literary student buried in books and in contemplative ease. He had none of the "indecisiveness which commonly renders literary men of no use in the world." The constant tendency of his mind towards antithesis and the balancing of opinions did not lead to paralysis in time of action – he did not shrink from responsibility, nor show on any occasion lack of courage. At various times of crisis, he proved himself a great leader. He returned to public life to defeat the Exclusion Bill.

During the Glorious Revolution, Halifax briefly assumed control of the government and was involved in maintaining public order. Party government had come to the birth during the struggles over the Exclusion Bill, and there had been unconsciously introduced into politics a novel element of which the nature and importance were not understood or suspected. Halifax had consistently ignored and neglected party, and it now had its revenge. Detested by the Whigs and by the Tories alike, and defended by neither, the favor alone of the king and his own abilities proved insufficient to withstand sustained criticism in parliament, and he yielded to the superior force. He seems to have been at last convinced of the necessity of party government in English political life, for though in his cautions to electors he warns against men "tied to a party," in his last words he declares: "If there are two parties a man ought to adhere to that which he disliked least though in the whole he doth not approve it; for whilst he doth not list himself in one or the other party, he is looked upon as such a straggler that he is fallen upon by both. . . . Happy those that are convinced so as to be of the general opinions."

=== Character ===
The private character of Halifax was in harmony with his public career. He was by no means the "voluptuary" described by Macaulay. He was non-indulgent, decent and frugal, and dressed plainly. He was an affectionate father and husband. "His heart," says Burnet, "was much set on raising his family" — his last concern even while on his deathbed was the remarriage of his son Lord Elland to perpetuate his name. This is probably the cause of his acceptance of so many titles for which he affected a philosophical indifference. Throughout his career, he showed an honourable independence. In a period when even great men stooped to accept bribes, Halifax was known to be incorruptible and did not harbour resentments. "Not only from policy," says John Reresby, "but from his disposition I never saw any man more ready to forgive than himself."

Few were insensible to his personal charm and gaiety. He excelled especially in quick repartée, in "exquisite nonsense," and in spontaneous humour. When quite a young man, just entering upon political life, Evelyn described him as "a witty gentleman, if not a little too prompt and daring." The latter characteristic was not moderated by time but persisted throughout his life. He was incapable of controlling his spirit of raillery, from jests on Siamese missionaries to sarcasm at the expense of the heir to the throne and the ridicule of hereditary monarchy. His brilliant paradoxes, his pungent and often profane epigrams were received by graver persons as his real opinions and as evidence of atheism. The latter charge he repudiated, assuring Burnet that he was "a Christian in submission," but that he could not digest iron like an ostrich nor swallow all that the divines sought to impose upon the world.

The Viking Book of Aphorisms, edited by W. H. Auden and Louis Kronenberger, contains more entries by Halifax (60) than by any other English language author except Samuel Johnson.

== Writings ==
Halifax's speeches have not been preserved, while several political writings do survive. The Character of a Trimmer (1684 or 1685) was written seemingly as advice to the king and as a manifesto of his own opinions. In it, he discusses the political problems of the time and their solution on broad principles. He supports the Test Act and, while opposing the Indulgence, is not hostile to the repeal of the penal laws against the Roman Catholics by parliament. Turning to foreign affairs, he contemplates with consternation the growing power of France and the humiliation of England, exclaiming at the sight of the "Roses blasted and discoloured while lilies triumph and grow insolent upon the comparison." The whole is a summary of the political situation and its exigencies; while, when he treats such themes as liberty, or discusses the balance to be maintained between freedom and government in the constitution, he rises to the political idealism of Bolingbroke and Burke.

The Character of King Charles II, to be compared with his earlier sketch of the king in the Character of a Trimmer, is perhaps from the literary point of view the most admirable of his writings. The famous Letter to a Dissenter (1687) was thought by Sir James Mackintosh to be unrivalled as a political pamphlet. The Lady’s New Year’s Gift: or Advice to a Daughter, refers to his daughter Elizabeth, afterwards mother of the celebrated 4th Earl of Chesterfield (1688). In The Anatomy of an Equivalent (1688) he treats with keen wit and power of analysis the proposal to grant a "perpetual edict" in favour of the Established Church in return for the repeal of the test and penal laws.

Maxims of State appeared about 1692. The Rough Draft of a New Model at Sea (c. 1694), though apparently only a fragment, is one of the most interesting and characteristic of his writings. He discusses the naval establishment, not from the naval point of view alone, but from the general aspect of the constitution of which it is a detail, and is thus led to consider the nature of the constitution itself, and to show that it is not an artificial structure but a growth and product of the natural character. Multiple editions of his works have been released since his death, including H. C. Foxcroft's "Life and Letters." The most recent edition, by Mark N. Brown, is titled The Works of George Savile Marquis of Halifax, 3 vols., Oxford, Clarendon Press, 1989. A paperback collection was edited by J. P. Kenyon for the "Pelican Classics" series in 1969, but it is now out of print.

Political offices
Preceded by The Earl of Anglesey	Lord Privy Seal; 1682–1685	Succeeded by The Earl of Clarendon
Preceded by The Earl of Rochester	Lord President of the Council; 1685	Succeeded by The Earl of Sunderland
Preceded by The Lord Arundell of Wardour	Lord Privy Seal; 1689–1690	In commission
Preceded by The Earl of Rochester, The Earl of Godolphin, and The Earl of Sunderland	Chief Minister of England; 1689–1690; With: The Marquess of Carmarthen	Succeeded by The Marquess of Carmarthen
Honorary titles
Preceded by Lord Thomas Howard	Custos Rotulorum of the West Riding of Yorkshire; 1689–1695	Vacant Title next held by The Earl of Burlington
Peerage of England
New creation	Marquess of Halifax; 1682–1695	Succeeded by William Savile
New creation	Earl of Halifax; 1679–1695	Succeeded by William Savile
New creation	Viscount Halifax; 1667–1695	Succeeded by William Savile
Baronetage of England
Preceded by William Savile	Baronet (of Thornhill); 1644–1695	Succeeded by William Savile
