= Henry Spencer, 1st Earl of Sunderland =

English nobleman and politician (1620–1643)

The Right Honourable The Earl of Sunderland
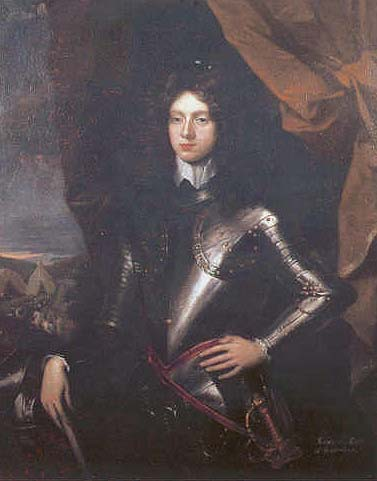
- Henry Spencer, 1st Earl of Sunderland
- Born: c. 23 November 1620
- Died: 20 September 1643 (aged 22) †
- Spouse: Dorothy Spencer, Countess of Sunderland (m. 1639)
- Children: Lady Dorothy Spencer; Robert Spencer, 2nd Earl of Sunderland; Lady Penelope Spencer
- Parent(s): William Spencer, 2nd Baron Spencer of Wormleighton; Lady Penelope Wriothesley

Henry Spencer, 1st Earl of Sunderland, 3rd Baron Spencer of Wormleighton (c. 23 November 1620 – 20 September 1643), known as the Lord Spencer between 1636 and June 1643, was an English peer, nobleman, and politician from the Spencer family who fought and died in the English Civil War on the side of the Cavaliers.

== Life ==
Henry was born at Althorp to William Spencer, 2nd Baron Spencer of Wormleighton and Lady Penelope Wriothesley, daughter of Henry Wriothesley, 3rd Earl of Southampton, and was baptised on 23 November 1620 at Great Brington church. He attended Magdalen College, Oxford and graduated from there with a Master of Arts degree on 31 August 1636. He then succeeded to his father's title of Baron Spencer later that year on 19 December 1636.

== Family ==
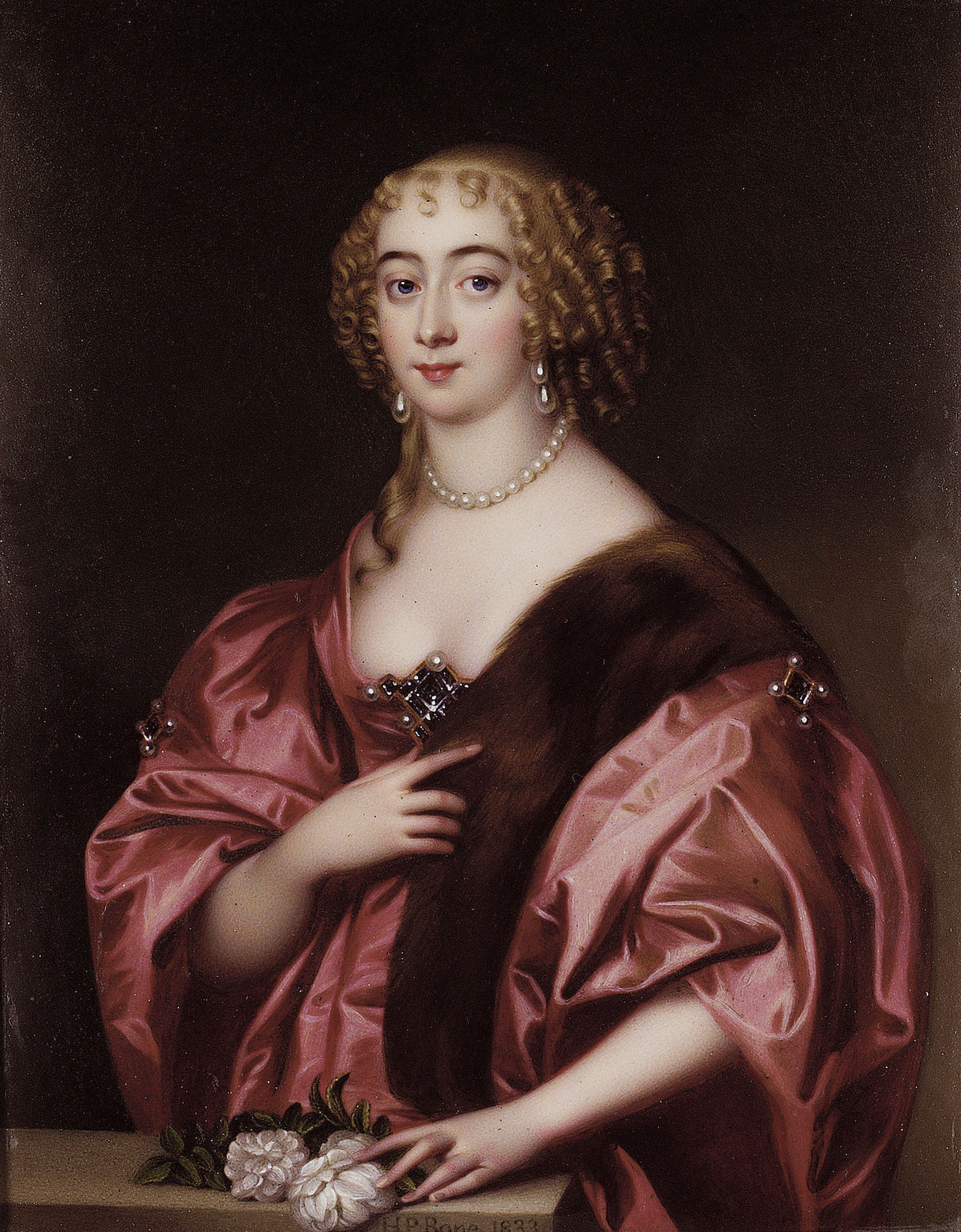
Dorothy Sidney (1617-1684) (Henry Pierce Bone)

On 20 July 1639 at Penshurst, he married Lady Dorothy Sidney, daughter of Robert Sidney, 2nd Earl of Leicester at Penshurst Place. It was generally believed to be a love marriage and had his father-in-law's warm approval: after Spencer's death, her father consoled Dorothy by reminding her of her happy marriage, which he was happy to have helped bring about. Spencer and his wife had three children:

- Lady Dorothy Spencer (1640–1670), married George Savile, 1st Marquess of Halifax and had issue.
- Robert Spencer, 2nd Earl of Sunderland (1641–1702)
- Lady Penelope Spencer (c. 1642–1667), died unmarried.

== Death ==
Henry fought in the Battle of Edgehill in 1642 and was rewarded for his services on 8 June 1643 by being created 1st Earl of Sunderland (although the title cost him £3,000). He then fought in the Siege of Gloucester in August 1643 and the First Battle of Newbury on 20 September 1643, where he was killed, aged 22, by a cannonball. Cokayne writes that "he was, according to Clarendon, a lord of a great fortune, tender years ... and an early judgment; who, having no command in the army, attended upon the King's person under the obligation of honour; and putting himself that day into the King's troop a volunteer, before they came to charge was taken away by a cannon bullet."

== Ancestry ==
Ancestors of Henry Spencer, 1st Earl of Sunderland

16. Sir John Spencer
8. Sir John Spencer
17. Katherine Kitson
4. Robert Spencer, 1st Baron Spencer of Wormleighton
18. Sir Robert Catlyn
9. Mary Catlyn
19. Ann Boles
2. William Spencer, 2nd Baron Spencer of Wormleighton
20. Sir Henry Willoughby
10. Sir Francis Willoughby
21. Anne Grey
5. Margaret Willoughby
22.
11. Elizabeth Littleton
23.
1. Henry Spencer, 1st Earl of Sunderland
24. Sir Henry Sidney
12. Robert Sidney, 1st Earl of Leicester
25. Mary Dudley
6. Henry Wriothesley, 3rd Earl of Southampton
26. John Gamage
13. Barbara Gamage
27.
3. Lady Penelope Wriothesley
28. George Vernon
14. John Vernon
29.
7. Elizabeth Vernon
30. Sir Richard Devereux
15. Elizabeth Devereux
31. Dorothy Hastings

Peerage of England
New creation	Earl of Sunderland; Jun – Sep 1643	Succeeded by Robert Spencer
Preceded by William Spencer	Baron Spencer; 1636–1643	Succeeded by Robert Spencer
