= John Lumley-Savile =

John Lumley-Savile may refer to:

- John Lumley-Savile, 7th Earl of Scarbrough (1761–1835), British peer
- John Lumley-Savile, 8th Earl of Scarbrough (1788–1856), British peer and politician
- John Lumley-Savile, 2nd Baron Savile (1854–1931), British peer and diplomat

== See also ==
- John Lumley (disambiguation)
- John Savile (disambiguation)
