= Baron Savile =

Barony in the Peerage of the United Kingdom

Barony of Savile
- Blazon: Arms: Argent on a Bend Sable three Owls affrontée of the first the whole within a Bordure wavy of the second.; Crests: An Owl affrontée Argent debruised by a Bendlet sinister wavy Sable.; Supporters: On either side a Talbot Ermine gorged with a Collar wavy Sable pendent therefrom an Escutcheon Or charged with a Popinjay Vert collared Gules
- Creation date: 27 October 1888
- Created by: Queen Victoria
- Peerage: Peerage of the United Kingdom
- First holder: John Savile, 1st Baron Savile
- Present holder: John Anthony Thornhill Lumley-Savile, 4th Baron Savile
- Heir presumptive: the Hon. James George Augustus Lumley-Savile
- Status: Extant
- Seat: Gryce Hall
- Former seat: Rufford Abbey
- Motto: BEE FAST

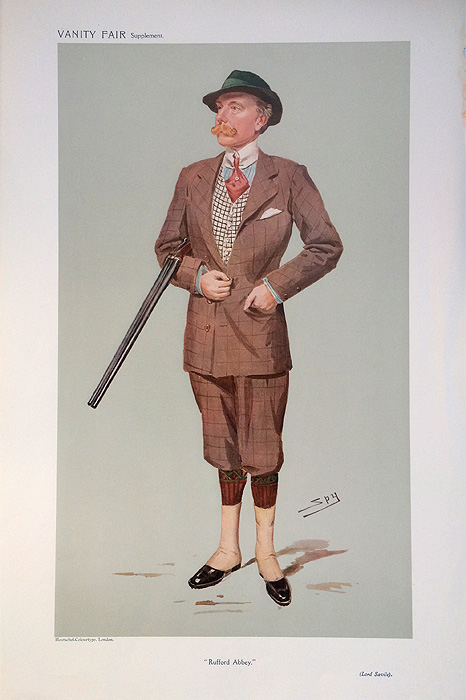
John Lumley-Savile (2nd Baron Savile) caricatured by Spy in Vanity Fair, 1908. The image is captioned "Rufford Abbey".

Baron Savile, of Rufford in the County of Nottingham, is a title in the Peerage of the United Kingdom. It was created in 1888 for the diplomat Sir John Savile. He was the eldest of the five illegitimate children of John Lumley-Savile, 8th Earl of Scarbrough, and the grandson of John Lumley-Savile, 7th Earl of Scarbrough. The latter was the fourth of the seven sons of Richard Lumley-Saunderson, 4th Earl of Scarbrough, and his wife Barbara, sister and heiress of the politician Sir George Savile, 8th and last Baronet, of Thornhill (see Savile Baronets for more information on this title), who bequeathed the substantial Savile estates in Yorkshire and Nottinghamshire (including Rufford and Thornhill) to his nephew the Hon. Richard Lumley-Saunderson, later 6th Earl of Scarbrough. On his death the estates passed to his younger brother, the aforementioned seventh Earl, and then to his son the eighth Earl. The latter bequeathed the estates to his second natural son Captain Henry Lumley-Savile (d. 1881). When he died they passed to his younger brother Augustus William Lumley-Savile (1829–1887) and then to his eldest brother, the aforementioned John Savile, who was created Baron Savile the following year.

The peerage was created with remainder to Savile's nephew John Lumley, who succeeded him as second Baron. In 1898 the latter assumed by Royal licence the surname of Savile in addition to that of Lumley. As of 2017, the title is held by his grandson, the fourth Baron, who succeeded his uncle in 2008.

From 1938 to 2008 (when the 3rd Baron Savile died), the family seat was Gryce Hall, near Shelley, West Yorkshire. The ancestral seat (sold in 1938) was Rufford Abbey, near Rufford, Nottinghamshire.

== Barons Savile (1888) ==
- John Lumley-Savile, 8th Earl of Scarbrough (1788–1856)
  - John Savile, 1st Baron Savile (1818–1896)
  - Rev. Frederick Savile-Lumley (1819–1859)
    - John Savile Lumley-Savile, 2nd Baron Savile (1854–1931) (succeeded according to special remainder)
      - George Halifax Lumley-Savile, 3rd Baron Savile (1919–2008)
      - Hon. Henry Leoline Thornhill Lumley-Savile (1923–2001)
        - John Anthony Thornhill Lumley-Savile, 4th Baron Savile (born 1947)
        - (1) James George Augustus Lumley-Savile (born 1975)
        - (2) Peter Edward Henry Lumley-Savile (born 1975)
        - (3) Robin William Matthew Lumley-Savile (born 1975)

The heir presumptive is the present holder's half-brother, James George Augustus Lumley-Savile (born 1975).

== See also ==
- Earl of Scarbrough
- Savile baronets
