= Sir George Savile, 8th Baronet =

English politician of the 18th Century

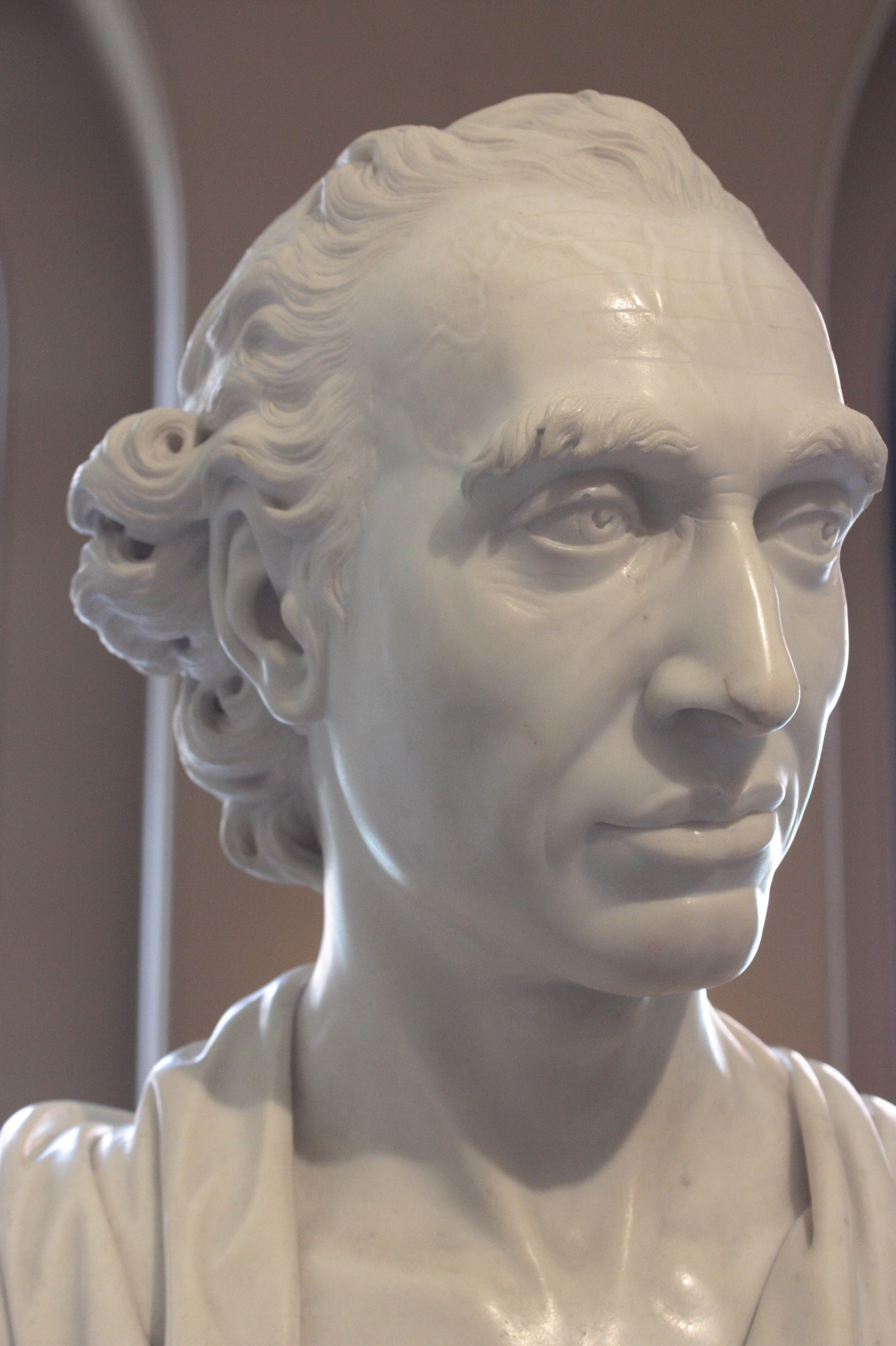
Sir George Savile by Joseph Nollekens, 1784, Victoria and Albert Museum

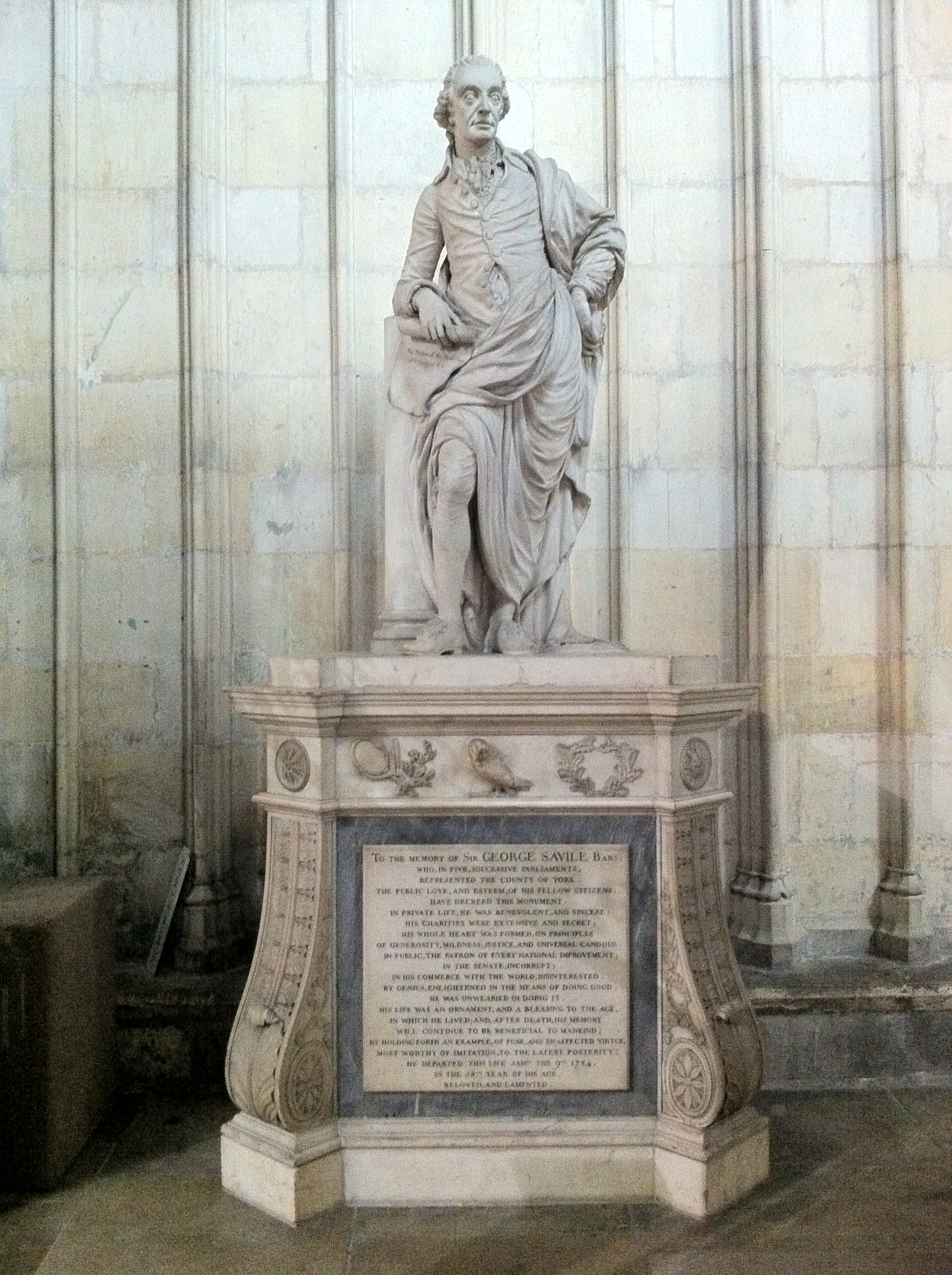
Monument to Sir George Savile in the north choir aisle of York Minster

Sir George Savile, 8th Baronet of Thornhill FRS (18 July 1726 – 10 January 1784), was an English politician who sat in the House of Commons from 1759 to 1783.

== Background ==
Savile was born in Savile House, London, the only son of Sir George Savile, 7th Baronet, and Lady Savile (born Mary Pratt, later married to Charles Morton), of Rufford Abbey, Nottinghamshire, and inherited his baronetcy on the death of his father in 1743. Savile was educated at Queens' College, Cambridge.

== Political career ==
Savile was returned unopposed as Member of Parliament for Yorkshire at a by-election on 3 January 1759. In general he advocated views of a very liberal character, including measures of relief to Roman Catholics and to Protestant dissenters, and he defended the action of the American colonists. He introduced the Catholic Relief Act, leading to the Gordon Riots in 1780. He refused to take office and in 1783 he resigned his seat in parliament. He was elected a Fellow of the Royal Society in December 1747. He was elected as a member to the American Philosophical Society in 1768.

== Personal life ==
Savile died unmarried in London and was buried in the family vault at Thornhill, West Riding of Yorkshire. Horace Walpole said Savile had a large fortune and a larger mind, and Edmund Burke also had a high opinion of him.

Part of the inscription on his statue in York Minster by John Fisher reads,

"In private life, he was benevolent, and sincere;
His charities were extensive and secret;
His whole heart was founded on principles
Of generosity, mildness, justice, and universal candour.
In public, the patron of every national improvement;
In the senate, incorrupt;
In his commerce with the world, disinterested."

== Bequests ==
Rufford Abbey and some of his other estates were bequeathed to his nephew, Richard Lumley (1757–1832), a younger son of Richard Lumley-Saunderson, 4th Earl of Scarbrough (1725–1752). Richard took the additional name of Savile, but when on his brother's death in 1807 he became 6th Earl of Scarbrough the Savile estates passed to his brother John (1760–1835), afterwards the 7th earl. John's son and heir was John Lumley-Savile, 8th Earl of Scarbrough (1788–1856). The 8th earl was never married, but he left four natural sons, the eldest of whom was John Savile (1818–1896), the diplomat, who was created Baron Savile of Rufford in 1888. He entered the foreign office in 1841, was British envoy at Dresden and Bern, and from 1883 to 1888 represented his country in Rome. Although the eldest son, he did not inherit Rufford and his father's other estates until after the deaths of two of his younger brothers. He made a fine collection of pictures and died at Rufford on 28 November 1896, when his nephew John Lumley-Savile (born 1854) became the 2nd Baron. He was a member of the Oddfellows.

== See also ==
- List of abolitionist forerunners

Parliament of Great Britain
Preceded by Sir Conyers Darcy; The Viscount Downe	Member of Parliament for Yorkshire; 1759–1784; With: The Viscount Downe 1759–1761; Edwin Lascelles 1761–1780; Henry Duncombe 1780–1784	Succeeded by Henry Duncombe; Francis Ferrand Foljambe
Baronetage of England
Preceded by George Savile	Baronet (of Thornhill); 1743–1784	Extinct
