= Lord Clinton =

Lord Clinton may refer to:

- Lord Charles Clinton (1813–1894), a British Conservative politician
- Lord Robert Clinton (1820–1867), a British Liberal Party politician
- Lord Edward Clinton (1836–1907), a British Liberal Party politician
- Lord Arthur Clinton (1840–1870), a British Liberal Party politician

Any of the men who held either of the following titles:

- Baron Clinton
- Earl of Lincoln (1572 creation) (or their eldest sons who used Lord Clinton as a courtesy title)
