= North Nottinghamshire =

Parliamentary constituency in the United Kingdom, 1832–1885

- Former county constituency for the House of Commons
- Form 1832-1885. Extract from 1837 result: the central, blue area.
- County: Nottinghamshire

1832–1885
- Seats: Two
- Created from: Nottinghamshire
- Replaced by: Bassetlaw; Mansfield; Rushcliffe

North Nottinghamshire, formally the "Northern Division of Nottinghamshire" was a county constituency represented in the House of Commons of the Parliament of the United Kingdom. It elected two Members of Parliament (MPs) by the block vote system of election.

== Boundaries ==
1832–1885: The Hundreds of Bassetlaw and Broxtowe.

== History ==
The constituency was created by the Reform Act 1832 for the 1832 general election, when the two-seat Nottinghamshire constituency was replaced by the Northern and Southern divisions, each of which elected two MPs.

Both divisions were abolished by the Redistribution of Seats Act 1885 for the 1885 general election, when they were replaced by four new single-seat constituencies: Bassetlaw, Mansfield, Newark and Rushcliffe.

== Members of Parliament ==
Election	1st Member	1st Party	2nd Member	2nd Party
1832	Viscount Lumley	Whig	Thomas Houldsworth	Tory
1834	Viscount Lumley	Whig	Thomas Houldsworth	Conservative
1835	Henry Gally Knight	Conservative	Thomas Houldsworth	Conservative
1846 by-election	Lord Henry Bentinck	Conservative	Thomas Houldsworth	Conservative
1852	Lord Henry Bentinck	Conservative	Lord Robert Pelham-Clinton	Peelite
1857	Sir Evelyn Denison	Whig	Lord Robert Pelham-Clinton	Peelite
1859	Sir Evelyn Denison	Liberal	Lord Robert Pelham-Clinton	Liberal
1865	Sir Evelyn Denison	Liberal	Lord Edward Pelham-Clinton	Liberal
1868	Sir Evelyn Denison	Liberal	Frederick Chatfield Smith	Conservative
1872 by-election	Hon. George Monckton-Arundell	Conservative	Frederick Chatfield Smith	Conservative
1880	Hon. George Monckton-Arundell	Conservative	Cecil Foljambe	Liberal
1885	Redistribution of Seats Act: constituency abolished			

== Election results ==
=== Elections in the 1830s ===
General election 1832: North Nottinghamshire (2 seats)
Party	Candidate	Votes	%
Whig	John Lumley-Savile	1,680	39.8
Tory	Thomas Houldsworth	1,372	32.5
Whig	John Gilbert Cooper-Gardiner	1,171	27.7
Turnout		2,548	88.2
Registered electors		2,889	
Majority		308	7.3
Whig win (new seat)			
Majority		201	4.8
Tory win (new seat)			

General election 1835: North Nottinghamshire (2 seats)
Party	Candidate	Votes	%
Whig	John Lumley-Savile	Unopposed	
Conservative	Thomas Houldsworth	Unopposed	
Registered electors		3,379	
Whig hold			
Conservative hold			

Lumley-Savile succeeded to the peerage, becoming 8th Earl of Scarbrough and causing a by-election.

By-election, 31 March 1835: North Nottinghamshire
Party	Candidate	Votes	%
Conservative	Henry Gally Knight	Unopposed	
Conservative gain from Whig			

General election 1837: North Nottinghamshire (2 seats)
Party	Candidate	Votes	%
Conservative	Thomas Houldsworth	1,698	35.8
Conservative	Henry Gally Knight	1,572	33.1
Whig	George Saville Foljambe	1,478	31.1
Majority		94	2.0
Turnout		2,913	85.4
Registered electors		3,410	
Conservative hold			
Conservative gain from Whig			

=== Elections in the 1840s ===
General election 1841: North Nottinghamshire (2 seats)
Party	Candidate	Votes	%	±%
Conservative	Henry Gally Knight	Unopposed		
Conservative	Thomas Houldsworth	Unopposed		
Registered electors		3,721		
Conservative hold				
Conservative hold				

Knight's death caused a by-election.

By-election, 6 March 1846: North Nottinghamshire
Party	Candidate	Votes	%	±%
Conservative	Henry Scott-Bentinck	1,742	88.9	N/A
Conservative	Henry Pelham-Clinton	217	11.1	N/A
Majority		1,525	77.8	N/A
Turnout		1,959	53.7	N/A
Registered electors		3,650		
Conservative hold		Swing	N/A	

General election 1847: North Nottinghamshire (2 seats)
Party	Candidate	Votes	%	±%
Conservative	Henry Scott-Bentinck	Unopposed		
Conservative	Thomas Houldsworth	Unopposed		
Registered electors		3,910		
Conservative hold				
Conservative hold				

=== Elections in the 1850s ===
General election 1852: North Nottinghamshire (2 seats)
Party	Candidate	Votes	%	±%
Conservative	Henry Scott-Bentinck	Unopposed		
Peelite	Robert Pelham-Clinton	Unopposed		
Registered electors		3,996		
Conservative hold				
Peelite gain from Conservative				

General election 1857: North Nottinghamshire (2 seats)
Party	Candidate	Votes	%	±%
Whig	Evelyn Denison	Unopposed		
Peelite	Robert Pelham-Clinton	Unopposed		
Registered electors		4,028		
Whig gain from Conservative				
Peelite hold				

General election 1859: North Nottinghamshire (2 seats)
Party	Candidate	Votes	%	±%
Speaker	Evelyn Denison	Unopposed		
Liberal	Robert Pelham-Clinton	Unopposed		
Registered electors		4,062		
Speaker hold				
Liberal hold				

=== Elections in the 1860s ===
General election 1865: North Nottinghamshire (2 seats)
Party	Candidate	Votes	%	±%
Speaker	Evelyn Denison	Unopposed		
Liberal	Edward Pelham-Clinton	Unopposed		
Registered electors		4,065		
Speaker hold				
Liberal hold				

General election 1868: North Nottinghamshire (2 seats)
Party	Candidate	Votes	%	±%
Speaker	Evelyn Denison	Unopposed		
Conservative	Frederick Chatfield Smith	Unopposed		
Registered electors		5,205		
Speaker hold				
Conservative gain from Liberal				

=== Elections in the 1870s ===
Denison was elevated to the peerage, becoming Viscount Ossington.

By-election, 26 Feb 1872: North Nottinghamshire (1 seat)
Party	Candidate	Votes	%	±%
Conservative	George Monckton-Arundell	2,580	62.9	N/A
Liberal	Robert Laycock	1,524	37.1	New
Majority		1,056	25.8	N/A
Turnout		4,104	75.3	N/A
Registered electors		5,448		
Conservative gain from Liberal				

General election 1874: North Nottinghamshire (2 seats)
Party	Candidate	Votes	%	±%
Conservative	George Monckton-Arundell	Unopposed		
Conservative	Frederick Chatfield Smith	Unopposed		
Registered electors		6,297		
Conservative gain from Liberal				
Conservative hold				

=== Elections in the 1880s ===
General election 1880: North Nottinghamshire (2 seats)
Party	Candidate	Votes	%	±%
Liberal	Cecil Foljambe	2,814	25.7	New
Conservative	George Monckton-Arundell	2,745	25.1	N/A
Liberal	Henry Fox Bristowe	2,735	25.0	New
Conservative	William Evelyn Denison	2,646	24.2	N/A
Turnout		5,470 (est)	81.7 (est)	N/A
Registered electors		6,699		
Majority		168	1.5	N/A
Liberal gain from Conservative		Swing		
Majority		10	0.1	N/A
Conservative hold		Swing		

== Notes ==
Parliament of the United Kingdom
Preceded by North Hampshire	Constituency represented by the speaker 1857–1872	Succeeded by Cambridgeshire
