= Earl of Scarbrough =

Title in the Peerage of England

Earldom of Scarbrough
- Arms of Lumley, Earl of Scarbrough: Argent, a fesse gules between three parrots vert collared of the second
- Creation date: 15 April 1690
- Created by: William III
- Peerage: Peerage of England
- First holder: Richard Lumley, 2nd Viscount Lumley
- Present holder: Richard Lumley, 13th Earl of Scarbrough
- Heir presumptive: Hon. Thomas Henry Lumley
- Remainder to: Heirs male of the first earl's body lawfully begotten
- Subsidiary titles: Viscount Lumley; Baron Lumley
- Seats: Sandbeck Park; Lumley Castle
- Former seat: Tickhill Castle
- Motto: Murus aeneus conscientia sana ("A sound conscience is a wall of brass")

Earl of Scarbrough is a title in the Peerage of England. It was created in 1690 for Richard Lumley, 2nd Viscount Lumley. He is best remembered as one of the Immortal Seven who invited William of Orange to invade England and depose his father-in-law James II. Lumley had already been created Baron Lumley, of Lumley Castle in the County of Durham, in 1681, and Viscount Lumley, of Lumley Castle in the County of Durham, in 1689. These titles are also in the Peerage of England. The title of Viscount Lumley, of Waterford, was created in the Peerage of Ireland in 1628 for his grandfather Sir Richard Lumley, who later fought as a Royalist in the Civil War.

Lord Scarbrough was succeeded by his eldest son, the second Earl. He represented East Grinstead and Arundel in the House of Commons and served as Lord Lieutenant of Northumberland. His younger brother, the third Earl, sat as Member of Parliament for Arundel and Lincolnshire. In 1723 he assumed by royal licence the additional surname of Saunderson, upon inheriting the estates of his cousin James Saunderson, 1st Earl Castleton. His son, the fourth Earl, served as Cofferer of the Household, as Deputy Earl Marshal of England and as Joint Vice-Treasurer of Ireland. Lord Scarbrough married Barbara Savile, sister and heiress of Sir George Savile, 8th Baronet. The latter bequeathed his substantial properties in Yorkshire and Nottinghamshire to his nephew the Hon. Richard Lumley, younger son of Lord and Lady Scarbrough.

Scarbrough was succeeded by his eldest son, the fifth Earl. He represented Lincoln in Parliament. On his death the titles passed to his younger brother the aforementioned the Hon. Richard Lumley, the sixth Earl. He also sat as Member of Parliament for Lincoln. He was succeeded by his younger brother John, the seventh Earl. He assumed the additional surname of Savile in 1807 in accordance with the will of his uncle Sir George Savile, and inherited the Savile estates on his brother's death. Lord Scarbrough was a clergyman. His son, the eighth Earl, represented Nottinghamshire and Nottinghamshire North in the House of Commons and served as Lord Lieutenant of Nottinghamshire. In 1836, he assumed by royal licence the additional and principal surname of Savile.

The eighth earl had several illegitimate children (see below) but never married. He was succeeded by his first cousin once removed, the ninth Earl. He was the grandson of the Hon. Frederick Lumley, fifth son of the fourth Earl. His son, the tenth Earl, was a soldier and also served as Lord Lieutenant of the West Riding of Yorkshire. He was succeeded by his nephew, the eleventh Earl. He was the son of Brigadier General the Hon. Osbert Lumley, younger son of the ninth Earl. Lord Scarbrough represented Kingston upon Hull East and York in Parliament and served as Governor of Bombay. His son, the twelfth Earl, was Lord Lieutenant of South Yorkshire. As of 2017 the titles are held by the latter's eldest son, the thirteenth Earl, who succeeded in 2004.

John Lumley-Savile, illegitimate son of the eighth Earl, was a prominent diplomat and was created Baron Savile in 1888.

The town in the North Riding of Yorkshire from which the title of the earldom is derived is now spelt Scarborough.

The family seat is Sandbeck Park near Rotherham, Yorkshire. The historic family seat is Lumley Castle, which is still owned by the earl, but is now a hotel.

== Viscounts Lumley (1628) ==
- Richard Lumley, 1st Viscount Lumley (1589–1663)
- Richard Lumley, 2nd Viscount Lumley (1650–1721) (created Earl of Scarbrough in 1690)

== Earls of Scarbrough (1690) ==
- Richard Lumley, 1st Earl of Scarbrough (1650–1721)
- Richard Lumley, 2nd Earl of Scarbrough (1686–1739)
- Thomas Lumley-Saunderson, 3rd Earl of Scarbrough (c. 1691–1752)
- Richard Lumley-Saunderson, 4th Earl of Scarbrough (1725–1782)
- George Augustus Lumley-Saunderson, 5th Earl of Scarbrough (1753–1807)
- Richard Lumley-Saunderson, 6th Earl of Scarbrough (1757–1832)
- John Lumley-Savile, 7th Earl of Scarbrough (1761–1835)
- John Lumley-Savile, 8th Earl of Scarbrough (1788–1856)
- Richard George Lumley, 9th Earl of Scarbrough (1813–1884)
- Aldred Frederick George Beresford Lumley, 10th Earl of Scarbrough (1857–1945)
- Lawrence Roger Lumley, 11th Earl of Scarbrough (1896–1969)
- Richard Aldred Lumley, 12th Earl of Scarbrough (1932–2004)
- Richard Osbert Lumley, 13th Earl of Scarbrough (b. 1973)

The heir presumptive is the present holder's brother the Hon. Thomas Henry Lumley (b. 1980). He is the sole heir in remainder to the peerages.

== See also ==
- Baron Lumley
- Baron Savile
- Savile Baronets
