= John Lumley =

John Lumley may refer to:

- John Lumley, 1st Baron Lumley (c. 1533–1609), English book and art collector
- John Lumley, 4th Baron Lumley (1493–1544), English nobleman and soldier
- John Lumley (Arundel MP) (c. 1703–1739), British Army officer and politician
- John L. Lumley (1930–2015), American fluid dynamicist and a professor
- John Stuart Penton Lumley, former professor of Vascular Surgery at the University of London
- John Lumley (real tennis), British real tennis player

== See also ==
- John Lumley-Savile (disambiguation)
