= John Savile =

John Savile may refer to:

- Sir John Savile of Shelley and Golcar, MP for Yorkshire (UK Parliament constituency) in 1376
- John Savile (died 1607), MP for Newton
- John Savile, 1st Baron Savile of Pontefract (1556–1630), MP for constituencies in Lincolnshire and Yorkshire
- John Savile, 1st Earl of Mexborough (1719–1778), Irish peer and British politician
- John Savile, 2nd Earl of Mexborough (1761–1830), Irish peer and British politician
- John Savile, 3rd Earl of Mexborough (1783–1860), British peer and politician
- John Savile, 4th Earl of Mexborough (1810–1899), British peer and politician
- John Savile, 1st Baron Savile (1818–1896), British diplomat and Ambassador to Italy

== See also ==
- John Saville (1916–2009), historian
- John Savill (born 1957), Chief Executive of the UK Medical Research Council
- John Lumley-Savile (disambiguation)
