= Vere Monckton-Arundell, Viscountess Galway =

British poet

The Right Honourable The Viscountess Galway DStJ
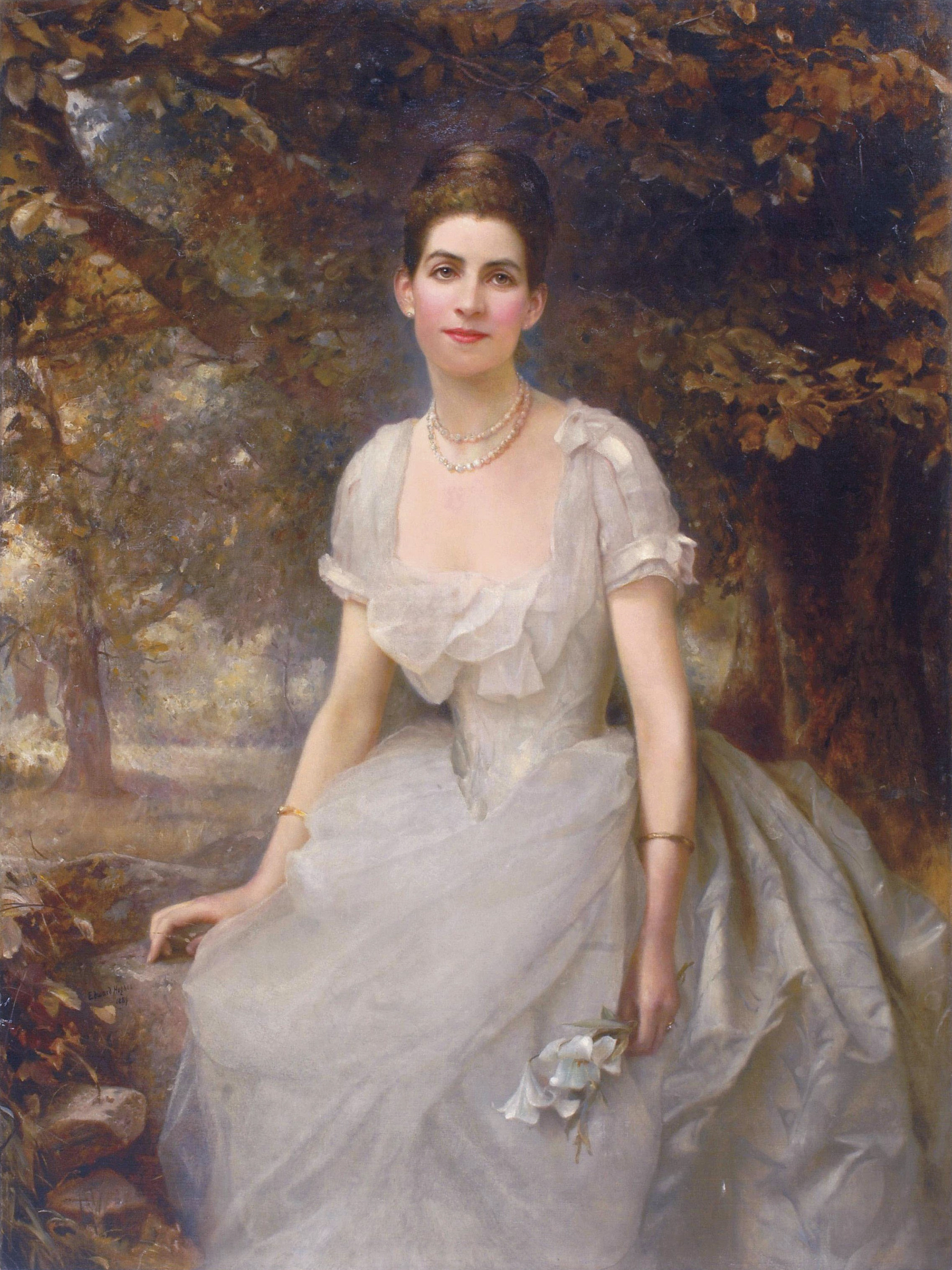
- Portrait of Lady Galway from 1889 by Edward Hughes

Personal details
- Born: Vere Gosling; 1859 Godalming, Waverly; Surrey, England
- Died: 3 January 1921 (aged 61–62)
- Spouse: George Monckton-Arundell, 7th Viscount Galway
- Children: Violet Frances Monckton; George Monckton-Arundell, 8th Viscount Galway
- Parents: Ellis Gosling (father); Emma Susan Duncombe (mother)

Vere Monckton-Arundell, Viscountess Galway (née Gosling DStJ; 1859 - 3 January 1921) was a British poet, writer, philanthropist, and woman of letters. In 1910, she co-founded an auxiliary hospital at her home, Serlby Hall, with her husband. She was invested as a Lady of Justice of The Most Venerable Order of the Hospital of St. John of Jerusalem.

== Biography ==
Lady Galway was born Vere Gosling in 1859 in Godalming, Surrey, the only daughter of Emma Susan Duncombe and Ellis Gosling of Busbridge Hall.

On 24 July 1879, she married George Edward Milnes Monckton-Arundell, 7th Viscount Galway. She and her husband founded a military hospital at their home, Serlby Hall, in 1910. The hospital functioned as an auxiliary hospital under Surgeon General Ford of York during World War I. The hospital was run and expenses covered by Lord and Lady Galway.

Lord and Lady Galway had two children, The Honourable Violet Frances Monckton and George Monckton-Arundell, 8th Viscount Galway.

Lady Galway was appointed a Lady of Justice of the Most Venerable Order of the Hospital of St. John of Jerusalem.

Lady Galway wrote The Art of Conserving in 1905 and The Programme of King Harry's Revel Held at Serlby in August 1908. She also wrote poetry. A book of her poetry, The Creed of Love and Other Poems, was published in 1922, after her death. After her death, a collection of her letters was also published. The collection includes letters to her husband; her son; her brother, Ellis D. Gosling; Aldred Lumley, 10th Earl of Scarbrough; Duchess Charlotte of Mecklenburg-Schwerin; Countess Eleanore zu Sayn-Wittgenstein-Sayn; and Sir Donald Mackenzie Wallace.

She died on 3 January 1921.
