= Lord Savile =

Lord Savile may refer to:

- Baron Savile of Pontefract, a hereditary title created in 1628 and became extinct in 1671
- Baron Savile, a hereditary title created in 1888

== See also ==
- Mark Saville, Baron Saville of Newdigate (born 1936), British judge and justice of the Supreme Court of the United Kingdom
