= 1872 North Nottinghamshire by-election =

UK Parliamentary by-election

The 1872 North Nottinghamshire by-election was fought on 26 February 1872. The by-election was fought due to the incumbent Liberal MP, Evelyn Denison, becoming a peer. It was won by the Conservative candidate George Monckton-Arundell.
