= Lord Scott =

Lord Scott may refer to:

- Lord Scott of Buccleuch, subsidiary title of Duke of Buccleuch
- Lord Scott of Whitchester and Eskdale, another subsidiary title of Duke of Buccleuch
- Richard Scott, Baron Scott of Foscote, British judge
- Lord Henry William Scott-Bentinck, British Conservative Party politician
