= John Savile, 1st Baron Savile =

British diplomat (1818–1896)

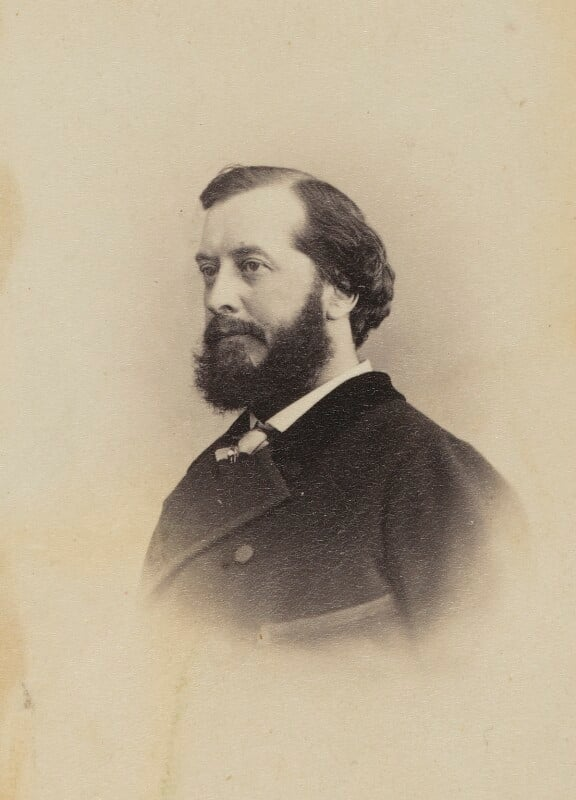
Savile in the 1860s

John Savile, 1st Baron Savile, GCB PC (né Lumley-Savile; 6 January 1818 – 28 November 1896), was a British diplomat who served as Ambassador to Italy from 1883 to 1888.

Born John Lumley-Savile, he was the eldest of the five illegitimate children of John Lumley-Savile, 8th Earl of Scarbrough and the grandson of John Lumley-Savile, 7th Earl of Scarbrough. The latter had succeeded to the Savile estates through his grandmother Barbara Savile, sister and heiress of Sir George Savile, 8th and last Baronet, of Thornhill (see the Marquess of Halifax) and wife of Richard Lumley-Saunderson, 4th Earl of Scarbrough. Lumley-Savile's mother was of French origin.

Lumley-Savile served as Attaché at the British embassies in Berlin from 1842 to 1849, in St Petersburg from 1849 to 1854 and as Secretary of Legation in Washington from 1854 to 1858, in Madrid from 1858 to 1860 and in Constantinople in 1860. The latter year, he was appointed Secretary to the Embassy in St Petersburg, in which post he remained until 1868. While in Russia he was made a member of the Russian Imperial Academy in 1866. He summarized some results of his extensive research on Russia's tea trade in an extensive report which he presented to the British Parliament.

Lumley-Savile later served as Envoy Extraordinary and Minister Plenipotentiary to Saxony from 1866 to 1867. He was then Envoy Extraordinary and Minister Plenipotentiary to the Swiss Confederation until 1868, when he was transferred to Belgium until 1883. The latter year he was admitted to the Privy Council and appointed Ambassador to Italy, a post he held until 1888.

Coat of arms of John Savile, 1st Baron Savile

In 1887, he succeeded to the Savile estates in Nottinghamshire and Yorkshire on the death of his younger brother, Augustus, and the same year he assumed by Royal licence the surname of Savile in lieu of Lumley. The following year he was raised to the peerage as Baron Savile, of Rufford in the County of Nottingham, with remainder to his nephew John Savile Lumley (later Lumley-Savile). Lord Savile died in November 1896, aged 78. He was succeeded in the Barony according to the special remainder by his nephew John Lumley-Savile, 2nd Baron Savile. Savile was laid to rest at St Margaret's Church, Bilsthorpe in Nottinghamshire.

== See also ==
- Earl of Scarbrough
- Marquess of Halifax
- Rufford Abbey

== Notes ==
Diplomatic posts
Preceded by Hon. Charles Murray	British Minister to Saxony; 1866–1867	Formation of North German Confederation
Preceded by Hon. Edward Alfred John Harris	Envoy Extraordinary and Minister Plenipotentiary to the Swiss Confederation; 1867–1868	Succeeded by Alfred Guthrie Graham Bonar
Preceded by Charles Ellis, 6th Baron Howard de Walden	Envoy Extraordinary and Minister Plenipotentiary to Belgium; 1868–1883	Succeeded by Sir Edward Baldwin Malet, 4th Baronet
Preceded by Sir Augustus Paget	British Ambassador to Italy; 1883–1888	Succeeded by The Marquess of Dufferin and Ava
Peerage of the United Kingdom
New creation	Baron Savile; 1888–1896	Succeeded by John Lumley-Savile
