= George Lumley-Saunderson, 5th Earl of Scarbrough =

British peer and politician

George Augustus Lumley-Saunderson, 5th Earl of Scarbrough (22 September 1753 – 5 September 1807), styled Viscount Lumley until 1782, was a British peer and politician who sat in the House of Commons from 1774 to 1780.

== Background ==
Scarbrough was the eldest son of Richard Lumley-Saunderson, 4th Earl of Scarbrough, and Barbara Savile, daughter of Sir George Savile, 7th Baronet. He was educated at Eton College from 1764 to 1770 and was admitted at King's College, Cambridge in 1771.

== Political career ==
Scarbrough was elected in a contest as Member of Parliament for Lincoln on his father's interest at the 1774 general election. He stood for Lincoln again in 1780, but was defeated. In 1782 he succeeded his father in the earldom and entered the House of Lords.

== Later life ==
Lord Scarbrough died in September 1807, aged 53. He never married and was succeeded by his younger brother, Richard.

Parliament of Great Britain
Preceded by Thomas Scrope; Hon. Constantine Phipps	Member of Parliament for Lincoln; 1774–1780; With: Robert Vyner	Succeeded by Robert Vyner; Sir Thomas Clarges, Bt
Peerage of England
Preceded by Richard Lumley-Saunderson	Earl of Scarbrough; 1782–1807	Succeeded by Richard Lumley-Saunderson
