= George Monckton-Arundell, 7th Viscount Galway =

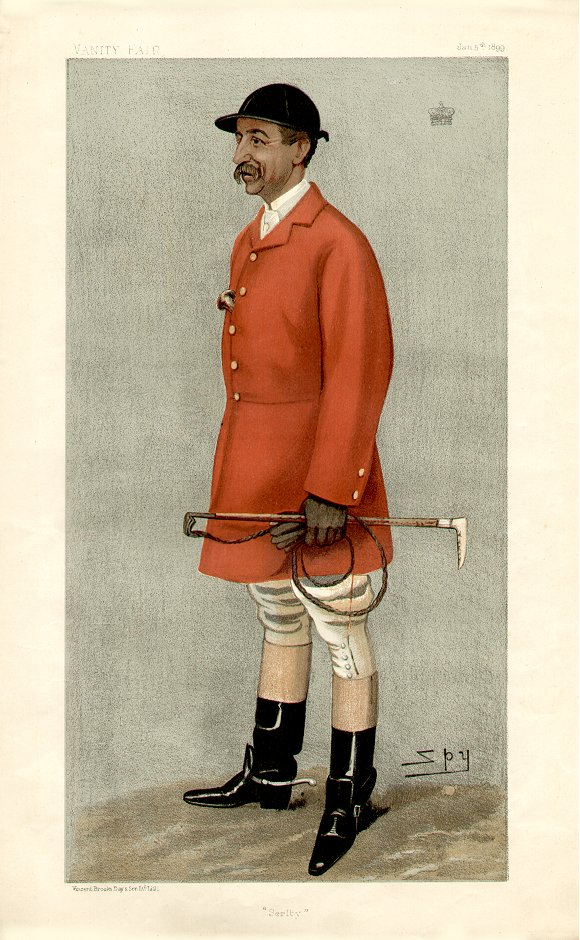
"Serlby" Viscount Galway as caricatured by Spy (Leslie Ward) in Vanity Fair, January 1899

George Edmund Milnes Monckton-Arundell, 7th Viscount Galway, CB JP DL (18 November 1844 – 7 March 1931) was a British Conservative politician and courtier.

== Early life ==
Galway was the son of George Monckton-Arundell, 6th Viscount Galway, and his wife and first cousin Henrietta Maria, daughter of Robert Pemberton Milnes and sister of Richard Monckton Milnes, 1st Baron Houghton.

He was educated at Eton and Christ Church, Oxford.

== Career ==
He entered Parliament for Nottinghamshire North in an 1872 by-election, a seat he held until 1885 when the constituency was abolished. He succeeded his father in the viscountcy in 1876 but as this was an Irish peerage he did not have to resign his seat in the House of Commons.

On 4 July 1887 Galway was created Baron Monckton, of Serlby in the County of Nottingham, in the Peerage of the United Kingdom, which entitled him to an automatic seat in the House of Lords. He later served as an Aide-de-Camp to Queen Victoria from 1897 to 1901, to Edward VII from 1901 to 1910 and to George V from 1910 to 1920. He was also involved in local affairs and served as a Justice of the Peace and Deputy Lieutenant for Nottinghamshire and as Chairman and Alderman of the Nottinghamshire County Council.

== Personal life ==
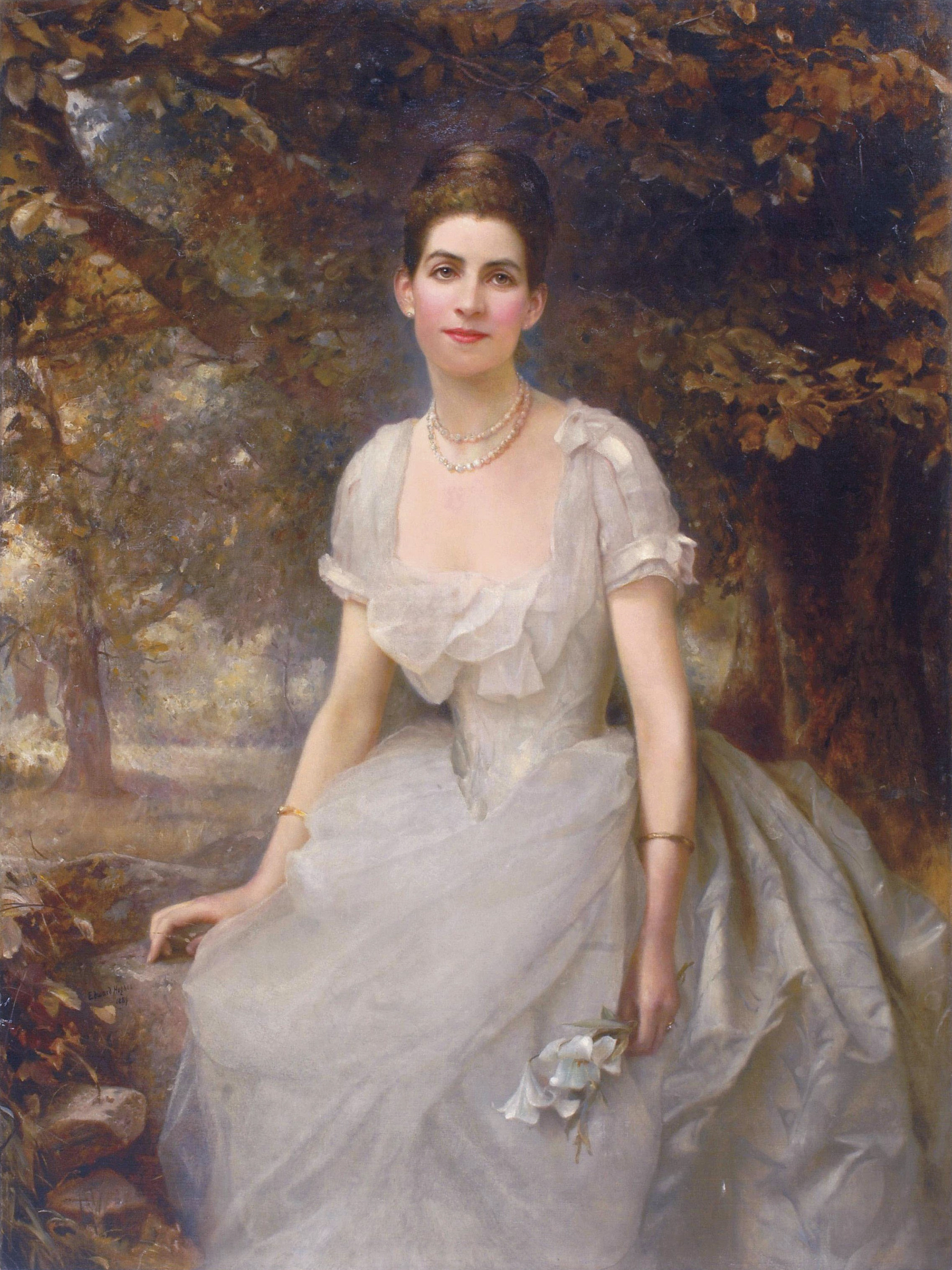
Vere Monckton-Arundell by Edward Hughes.

Lord Galway married Vere Gosling, the only daughter of Ellis Gosling of Busbridge Hall, Surrey in 1879.

She was invested as a Lady of Justice, Order of St. John of Jerusalem (L.J.St.J.). She died in 1921. Galway survived her by ten years and died in March 1931, aged 86. He was succeeded in his titles by his son George.

Parliament of the United Kingdom
Preceded by Evelyn Denison; Frederick Chatfield Smith	Member of Parliament for Nottinghamshire North; 1872–1885; With: Frederick Chatfield Smith 1872–1880; Cecil Foljambe 1880–1885	Constituency abolished
Peerage of Ireland
Preceded by George Edward Arundell Monckton-Arundell	Viscount Galway; 1876–1931	Succeeded by George Vere Arundell Monckton-Arundell
Peerage of the United Kingdom
New creation	Baron Monckton; 1887–1931	Succeeded by George Vere Arundell Monckton-Arundell
