= Speaker Denison's rule =

Parliamentary procedure rule

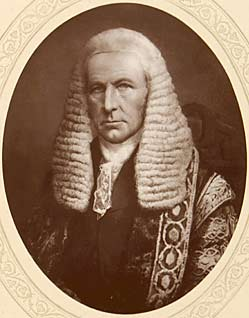
Evelyn Denison, 1st Viscount Ossington

Speaker Denison's rule is a constitutional convention established by John Evelyn Denison, who was Speaker of the British House of Commons from 1857 to 1872, regarding how the Speaker decides on their casting vote in the event of a tie in the number of votes cast in a division.

In 1867, when a tie arose on a motion on Fellowships at Trinity College, Dublin, Denison gave his casting vote against the motion, declaring that any decision must be approved by the majority. The rule as subsequently adopted is that the Speaker, in any division upon a bill, should vote to leave a bill in its existing form.

The principle is always to vote in favour of further debate, or, where it has been previously decided to have no further debate or in some specific instances, to vote in favour of the status quo. Thus, the Speaker will vote:

- against the final reading of a bill (and against holding such readings immediately rather than in the future, to allow for time to consider the matter)
- in favour of earlier readings of bills (and in favour of holding such readings immediately rather than in the future, to allow for further debate)
- against amendments to bills
- against motions of no confidence
- in favour of disagreeing with amendments made by the House of Lords

The thinking behind the rule is that change should only occur if an actual majority vote is in favour of the change.

Speaker Denison's rule is now a guiding principle in many other bodies that have neutral chairpersons.

== Tied votes in the British House of Commons ==
In the case of a Committee of the Whole House, the presiding officer is the Chairman of Ways and Means or a Deputy Chairman. In other cases of plenary session, the presiding officer is the Speaker or a Deputy Speaker. Votes of smaller Commons committees are not listed.

Date	Presiding officer	Issue	Ayes and noes	Position of casting vote	Ref.
10 May 1860	Speaker Evelyn Denison	Amendment to the Fisheries (Scotland) Bill	37	No	
19 June 1861	Speaker Evelyn Denison	Motion to give a third reading to the Church Rates Abolition Bill now rather than in six months (Note: A motion to give in reading in six or three months was a legal fiction tantamount to refusing to give it a reading at all.)	274	No	
1 July 1864	Speaker Evelyn Denison	Third reading of the Tests Abolition (Oxford) Bill	170	Aye (Note: The immediately subsequent motion "That the bill do now pass" was defeated; the changes proposed by the 1864 bill were effected by the Universities Tests Act 1871.)	
7 June 1866	Speaker Evelyn Denison	Motion to adjourn debate on the motion that 'Mr. Speaker do leave the Chair' (and that the House go into Committee on the Test Abolition Act 1867)	46	Aye	
24 July 1867	Speaker Evelyn Denison	Motion to declare the undesirability of restricting Fellowships and Foundation Scholarships of Trinity College, Dublin to believers in the established Church of Ireland	108	No	
10 June 1868	Speaker Evelyn Denison	Motion to give a second reading to the Married Women's Property Bill now rather than in six months	123	Aye	
15 June 1870	Speaker Evelyn Denison	Motion to put the question on the second reading of the Representation of the People Acts Amendment Bill	181	Aye	
25 July 1887	Speaker Arthur Peel	Motion to adjourn debate on the second reading of the Marriages Confirmation (Antwerp) Bill (Note: The bill proposed to legalise marriages invalidly solemnised in Antwerp by Arthur Potts, in particular that of Edward Langworthy to Mildred Palliser Long in 1883.)	75	Aye	
3 April 1905	Speaker William Court Gully	Motion for an instruction to the committee dealing with the London County Council (Tramways) Bill	171	No	
22 July 1910	Speaker James Lowther	Report stage amendment to the Regency Bill to restore words removed in Committee	61	Aye	
12 April 1938	Speaker Edward Fitzroy	Motion for leave to bring in the Jewish Citizenship Bill (to extend Palestinian citizenship to Jews outside Mandatory Palestine)	144	Aye	
1 May 1950	Chairman James Milner	Motion to reduce by £1000 the budget estimate for salaries in the Ministry of Transport	278	No	
1 March 1951	Deputy Chairman Charles MacAndrew	Motion that a clause stand part of the Reserve and Auxiliary Forces (Training) Bill	82	Aye	
24 June 1952	Deputy Speaker Charles MacAndrew	Motion for leave to bring in the Licensing at Airports Bill	173	Aye	
12 March 1958	Deputy Speaker Gordon Touche	Motion to add a new clause to the Maintenance Orders Bill	153	No	
2 June 1965	Temporary Chairman Herbert Butcher	Motion to retain wording of the Finance (No. 2) Bill	281	Aye	
27 May 1976	Speaker George Thomas	Amendment to a procedural motion relating to the Aircraft and Shipbuilding Industries Bill	303	No	
10 November 1976	Deputy Speaker Myer Galpern	Motion to disagree with a Lords amendment to the Dock Work Regulation Bill	309	Aye	
10 November 1976	Speaker George Thomas	Motion to disagree with a Lords amendment to the Dock Work Regulation Bill	310	Aye	
10 November 1976	Speaker George Thomas	Motion to disagree with a Lords amendment to the Dock Work Regulation Bill	310	Aye	
11 November 1976	Deputy Speaker Myer Galpern	Motion to disagree with a Lords amendment to the Aircraft and Shipbuilding Industries Bill	309	Aye	
17 July 1978	Deputy Speaker Godman Irvine	Motion to disagree with a Lords amendment to the Scotland Bill	286	Aye	
30 January 1980	Deputy Speaker Bernard Weatherill	Motion for leave to bring in the Televising of Parliament Bill	201	Aye	
21 June 1990	Deputy Speaker Sir Paul Dean	Report stage amendment to the Human Fertilisation and Embryology Bill's amendment of the Abortion Act 1967	197	No	
22 July 1993	Speaker Betty Boothroyd	Treaty of Maastricht (Social Protocol) – vote was later expunged (Note: There was believed to be a tied vote on an amendment to the motion, but it was quickly discovered that one extra "Aye" vote had been erroneously counted. Prior to the counting error having been noted, the Speaker did give a casting vote of "No", although this was later expunged when the error became clear.)	317	No	
3 April 2019	Speaker John Bercow	Brexit indicative vote amendment	310	No	
9 December 2025	Deputy Speaker Caroline Nokes	Motion for leave to bring in the UK-EU Customs Union (Duty to Negotiate) Bill	100	Aye	

== Tied votes elsewhere ==
The Speaker of the House of Commons of Canada in 2005, Peter Milliken, broke a tie on a confidence motion to pass the 2005 Canadian federal budget; this is the first and only time a tie on a confidence motion has occurred in Canada. Milliken cited parliamentary precedent while explaining his decision.
