= George Lumley-Savile, 3rd Baron Savile =

The Right Honourable The Lord Savile
- Coat of arms of George Lumley-Savile, 3rd Baron Savile

Member of the House of Lords
- Lord Temporal
- In office 3 April 1931 – 11 November 1999 as a hereditary peer
- Preceded by: The 2nd Baron Savile
- Succeeded by: Seat abolished (Note: Pursuant to the House of Lords Act 1999.)

Personal details
- Born: George Halifax Lumley-Savile; 24 January 1919
- Died: 2 June 2008 (aged 89)
- Political party: Conservative

George Halifax Lumley-Savile, 3rd Baron Savile (24 January 1919 – 2 June 2008), was an English landowner, member of the House of Lords, and president of the Country Landowners Association.

He was the elder son of John Lumley-Savile, 2nd Baron Savile, and inherited the title upon the latter's death in 1931. Lord Savile was a member of the House of Lords for 60 years and enjoyed attending the meetings of the House until the House of Lords Act 1999 denied hereditary peers their seats in the House.

In 1938, aged 19, Lord Savile, with promptings by his mother, sold the family seat at Rufford Abbey. He was sent to Ludgrove for prep school and then spent "four happy years" at Eton from 1932 to 1936. George and his younger brother Henry both won the Harmsworth Music Prize at Eton.

During the Second World War Lord Savile was a captain in the Duke of Wellington's Regiment (West Riding). Here, while still a second lieutenant, Savile was the platoon commander of conscript Tom Moore, now known as Sir Captain Tom Moore, knighted at the age of 100 for his COVID fund raising efforts. Despite a rocky start the experience of basic training commanded by Savile led Moore to believe Savile was the embodiment of how an officer and a gentlemen should be. Later Savile was attached to the 1st Battalion the Lincolnshire Regiment, which saw service in Burma during the campaigns of 1943 and 1944. After being demobbed he bought Gryce Hall, Shelley, near Huddersfield, to serve as the principal family seat, Walshaw being reserved as a shooting lodge. He was a keen shooter of grouse and opposed wind farms on his land. He served for many years as a magistrate in the Dewsbury area.

George enjoyed the company of younger people, and the Bloody Marys served by his butler to those fortunate enough to be invited to Sunday lunch at Gryce Hall, a late Elizabethan farm house ... were reckoned to be the best in the region.

George Savile gave in 1950 large areas of Hardcastle Crags to the National Trust and gave in 1960 Popples Common and adjacent moorland near Heptonstall to Hepton Rural District Council. He was a devout Anglican and patron of Emley Parish Church. He never married. His nephew, John Anthony Thornhill Lumley-Savile, inherited the title upon George's death in 2008 and the next year put Gryce Hall and Walshaw Lodge up for sale.

== Notes ==
Peerage of the United Kingdom
Preceded by John Lumley-Savile	Baron Savile; 1931–2008; Member of the House of Lords (1931–1999)	Succeeded by John Lumley-Savile
