= Frederick Chatfield Smith =

British Conservative Party politician

Arms of Smith: Or, a chevron cotised sable between three demi-griffins couped of the last the two in chief respecting each other

Frederic Chatfield Smith (11 June 1823 – 20 April 1905) was head of Smith's Bank in Nottingham and a British Conservative Party politician.

Smith was the son of Samuel George Smith (1789-1863), of Goldings, Hertfordshire and his wife Eugenia Chatfield (1803-1838).

Smith entered the House of Commons as Member of Parliament (MP) for Nottinghamshire North when he was elected unopposed at the 1868 general election. He was re-elected unopposed in 1874, and stood down at the 1880.

Parliament of the United Kingdom
Preceded by Lord Edward Pelham-Clinton; Sir Evelyn Denison	Member of Parliament for North Nottinghamshire; 1868 – 1880; With: Sir Evelyn Denison to 1872; Hon. George Monckton-Arundell from 1872	Succeeded by Cecil Foljambe; Hon. George Monckton-Arundell
