= Casting vote =

Vote an official can cast to resolve a tie or deadlock, which they cannot normally yet

A casting vote is a vote that someone may exercise to resolve a tied vote in a deliberative body. A casting vote is typically by the presiding officer of a council, legislative body, committee, etc., and may only be exercised to break a deadlock.

Examples of presiding officers who hold casting votes are the speaker of the House of Commons in the United Kingdom and the president of the United States Senate (an ex-officio role of the vice president of the United States).

== Use within a legislative body ==
In some legislatures, a casting vote may be exercised however the presiding officer wishes. For example, the vice president of the United States may exercise their casting vote when the Senate is evenly divided according to their own personal beliefs; by virtue of the vice president's political leanings and affiliations, the vice president's political party is able to serve as the majority party in the Senate and elect one of their own to serve as Majority Leader.

In some other legislatures, by contrast, a casting vote can only be exercised according to strict rules or constitutional conventions. For example, the speaker of the British House of Commons (a position whose functions and conventions of operation inspire similar roles in several other nations using the Westminster system) is expected by convention to follow Speaker Denison's rule (i.e., to vote to allow further discussion, if this is possible, and otherwise to vote in favour of the status quo). This in effect means "Yes/Yea/Aye" on the first and second reading of a bill, "No/Nay" on the third, "Yes/Yea/Aye" on the government's budget, and "No/Nay" on a motion of no confidence.

In the United States, the concept of a casting vote is not used in Robert's Rules of Order.

As a rule, it is only British-inspired parliamentary authorities that employ the concept of a "casting vote". Authors differ on whether the chair may vote in other capacities (like by ballot).

The concept of a "casting vote" is found in the UK parliamentary authority Erskine May: "If the numbers in a division are equal, the Speaker must give the casting vote."

Canadian parliamentary authorities reflect the tradition of the casting vote e.g., Bourinot's Rules of Order (1995) "Casting Vote - A single vote (usually the prerogative of the chair) that determines an issue when a vote on the motion has resulted in a tie." (page 14), and the Canadian House of Commons glossary describing the casting vote as "[t]he deciding vote accorded to the Speaker (or, in committee, to the chair) in the event of a tie. The speaker or chair may vote only in order to avoid a deadlock, and traditionally votes so as to maintain the status quo." In this latter example, the speaker or chair may only vote to break an equality of votes.

=== Robert's Rules of Order ===
Under some rules of parliamentary procedure, notably Robert's Rules of Order, the presiding officer does not have a "casting vote" in the way it is normally understood as a duty or option to vote to break a tie.

Robert's Rule of Order Newly Revised (12th Edition, 2020) does not include the concept of a casting vote. In RONR the presiding officer may vote by ballot and vote to break a tie. Quite differently than a casting vote, however, the presiding officer can also vote to cause a tie, defeating the motion (RONR 4:56, 44:12).

On small boards, however, those that are fewer than 12 persons, Robert's Rules empowers the chair to use their rights as members. If a member, not only may the chair debate all questions, but the chair can also vote on all questions: "If the Chairman is a member, he may, without leaving the chair, speak in informal discussions and in debate, and vote on all questions." (RONR 49:21, 7).

Informal discussions and motions may even be initiated by the chair (see footnote 4, 49:21). The chair of either small or large boards may only vote once (44:12), but if the chair of a small board withholds that vote until the mind of the house is known, the chair may vote to break or to cause a tie.

=== Exceptions ===
Some legislatures have abandoned the concept of a casting vote.

==== Australia ====
Some legislatures have a dual approach; for example, in the Australian Parliament:

- The speaker of the House of Representatives may not vote in general debates but has a casting vote to decide a tie. Conventionally, the speaker would support further discussion, where possible; allow decisions to be taken only by a majority; and, if the tied vote is on an amendment, leave the bill in its existing form.
- The president of the Senate usually votes in general debates, which are commonly based on party lines, but the president does not have a casting vote: a tied vote in the Senate defeats a bill.

==== Canada ====
The same arrangements as in Australia exist with respect to the speakers of the Canadian House and Senate.

==== Italy ====
By convention, in both the Chamber of Deputies and in the Senate, the presiding officer never casts a vote. In the event of a tie, the item put up to a vote is automatically deemed to have been defeated.

==== New Zealand ====
The speaker of the New Zealand House of Representatives formerly held a casting vote, similar to that of the speaker of the British House of Commons. Today, the speaker simply votes as an ordinary member; since an outright majority is necessary for a bill to pass, a tied vote defeats a bill.

==== Philippines ====
In the Congress of the Philippines, the openly-partisan presiding officers of the two chambers have different rules on a casting vote:

- In the Senate, the president of the Senate always votes, and always votes last; thus, if the motion is tied, it is lost.
- In the House, the speaker (or any presiding officer) only votes if there is a tie, otherwise the presiding officer abstains.

In the Commission on Appointments, the president of the Senate is the ex officio presiding officer, and only votes to break ties.

==== United Kingdom ====
The speaker of the United Kingdom House of Commons has a casting vote, which is conventionally cast in accordance with Speaker Denison's rule.

==== United States ====
===== House of Representatives =====
The speaker of the United States House of Representatives has the same right to vote as any other member of the House if they are a member of the House of Representatives (which they always have been in practice but need not be per the constitution), but to maintain the appearance of impartiality, typically does not do so unless it would make a difference, which is a de facto casting vote.

===== Senate =====
Pursuant to Article I, Section 3, Clause 4 of the United States Constitution, the vice president has a casting vote in the Senate, in the event of a tie.

== General elections ==
=== United Kingdom ===
At one time, in United Kingdom parliamentary elections, the returning officer (if an elector in the constituency) was allowed to give an additional casting vote to decide the election if there was a tie between two or more candidates. An example of this power being used was in the Bandon by-election of 22 July 1831. This type of casting vote does not now exist; after the 1866 Helston by-election, Parliament allowed candidates who tied to both be elected.

Ties in United Kingdom elections are now broken by drawing lots, using a method decided upon by the Returning Officer.

=== Canada ===
In the Canadian provinces of Ontario and New Brunswick, the returning officer has a casting vote in the event of a tie.

Ties in Nova Scotia, Prince Edward Island, and the territory of Yukon, are now broken by lots as they are in the United Kingdom currently.

In the remaining provinces and territories, as well as in federal elections, a tie vote results in a by-election held to elect a new member (who need not have been a candidate in the first election).

== Other uses ==
Under UK company legislation, a company whose articles of association before 1 October 2007 included suitable provision, the chair of an annual general meeting of the company may exercise a casting vote.

== See also ==
- Speaker Denison's rule
  - Speaker Denison's rule § Tied votes in the British House of Commons
