= Thomas Houldsworth =

Thomas Houldsworth (13 September 1771 – 1 September 1852) was a Tory, and then Conservative Party, politician in England. He was a member of parliament (MP) for 34 years, from 1818 to 1852.

Houldsworth MP for Pontefract from 1818 to 1830, and then for the rotten borough of Newton in Lancashire from 1830 until the borough was disenfranchised at 1832 general election. He was then elected for the Northern division of Nottinghamshire, and held that seat until he stepped down from the House of Commons at the general election in July 1852. He died two months later, aged 80.

Parliament of the United Kingdom
Preceded by Robert Pemberton Milnes; Viscount Pollington	Member of Parliament for Pontefract; 1818–1830; With: Viscount Pollington to 1826; Le Gendre Starkie 1826–1830	Succeeded by Hon. Henry Stafford-Jerningham; Sir Culling Eardley
Preceded by Thomas Alcock; Thomas Legh	Member of Parliament for Newton; 1830 – 1832; With: Thomas Legh	Constituency abolished
New constituency	Member of Parliament for North Nottinghamshire; 1832 – 1852; With: Viscount Lumley to 1835; Henry Gally-Knight 1835–1846; Lord Henry Bentinck from 1846	Succeeded by Lord Henry Bentinck; Lord Robert Pelham-Clinton
