= 1st Earl of Liverpool =

The Earl of Liverpool is a title that has been created twice in British history. The first Earl may refer to:

- Charles Jenkinson, 1st Earl of Liverpool (1729–1808), British statesman
- Cecil Foljambe, 1st Earl of Liverpool (1846–1907), British Liberal politician
