= Henry Gally Knight =

British politician, traveller and writer (1786–1846)

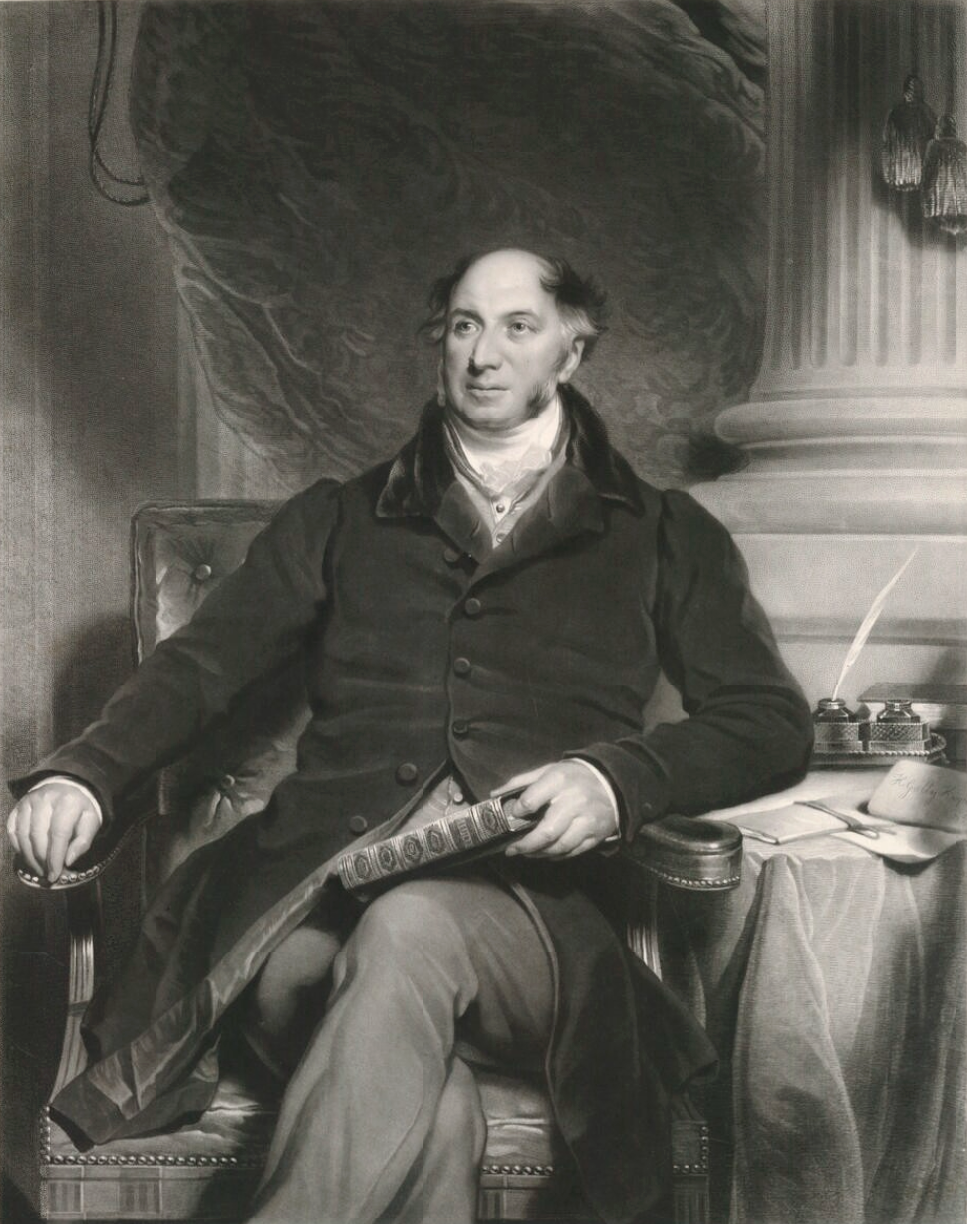
- Knight, c. 1840s, in a portrait by Samuel William Reynolds Jr.

Member of Parliament for North Nottinghamshire
- In office 1835-1846 Serving with Thomas Houldsworth

Member of Parliament for Malton
- In office 1831–1832 Serving with Francis Jeffrey (1831); Lord Cavendish of Keighley; Charles Pepys (1831-1832)

Member of Parliament for Aldborough
- In office 1814–1815 Serving with Henry Fynes

Personal details
- Born: Henry Gally; 2 December 1786
- Died: 9 February 1846 (aged 59)
- Spouse: Henrietta Hardolph Eyre
- Relatives: John Gally Knight (uncle); Frances Jacson (aunt); Maria Elizabetha Jacson (aunt)
- Education: Trinity Hall, Cambridge

Henry Gally Knight, F.R.S. (2 December 1786 – 9 February 1846) was a British politician, traveller and writer.

== Biography ==
Knight was the only son of Henry Gally (afterwards Gally Knight), barrister, of Langold, and was educated at Eton and Trinity Hall, Cambridge. He succeeded in 1808 to estates at Firbeck and Langold Park which his father had inherited in 1804 from his brother John Gally Knight.

Knight was appointed High Sheriff of Nottinghamshire for 1814–1815. He also held the office of deputy-lieutenant of Nottinghamshire. He was a Member of Parliament for the constituencies Aldborough (12 August 1814 - April 1815), Malton (1831–1832; 31 March 1835 - 9 February 1846), North Nottinghamshire (1835 and in 1837). In parliament he was a fluent but infrequent speaker. He was also a member of the commission for the advancement of the fine arts.

Knight was the subject of the 1818 satirical poem "Ballad to the Tune of Salley in our Alley" by Lord Byron, in which Byron facetiously accuses him of being not only a poetaster, but a dandy as well. (Note: See especially Byron's fifth stanza: He rode upon a Camel's hump Through Araby the sandy, Which surely must have hurt the rump Of this poetic dandy. His rhymes are of the costive kind, And barren as each valley In deserts which he left behind Has been the Muse of Gally.)

Knight owned Firbeck Hall in Rotherham. Sir Walter Scott's novel Ivanhoe is set nearby, and Knight may have been Scott's source of local information when he was writing the book. He was admitted a Fellow of the Royal Society on 20 May 1841.

== Family ==
Knight was the nephew of the novelist Frances Jacson. He married Henrietta, the daughter of Anthony Hardolph Eyre of Grove Park, Nottinghamshire and the widow of John Hardolph Eyre. They had no children.

== Works ==
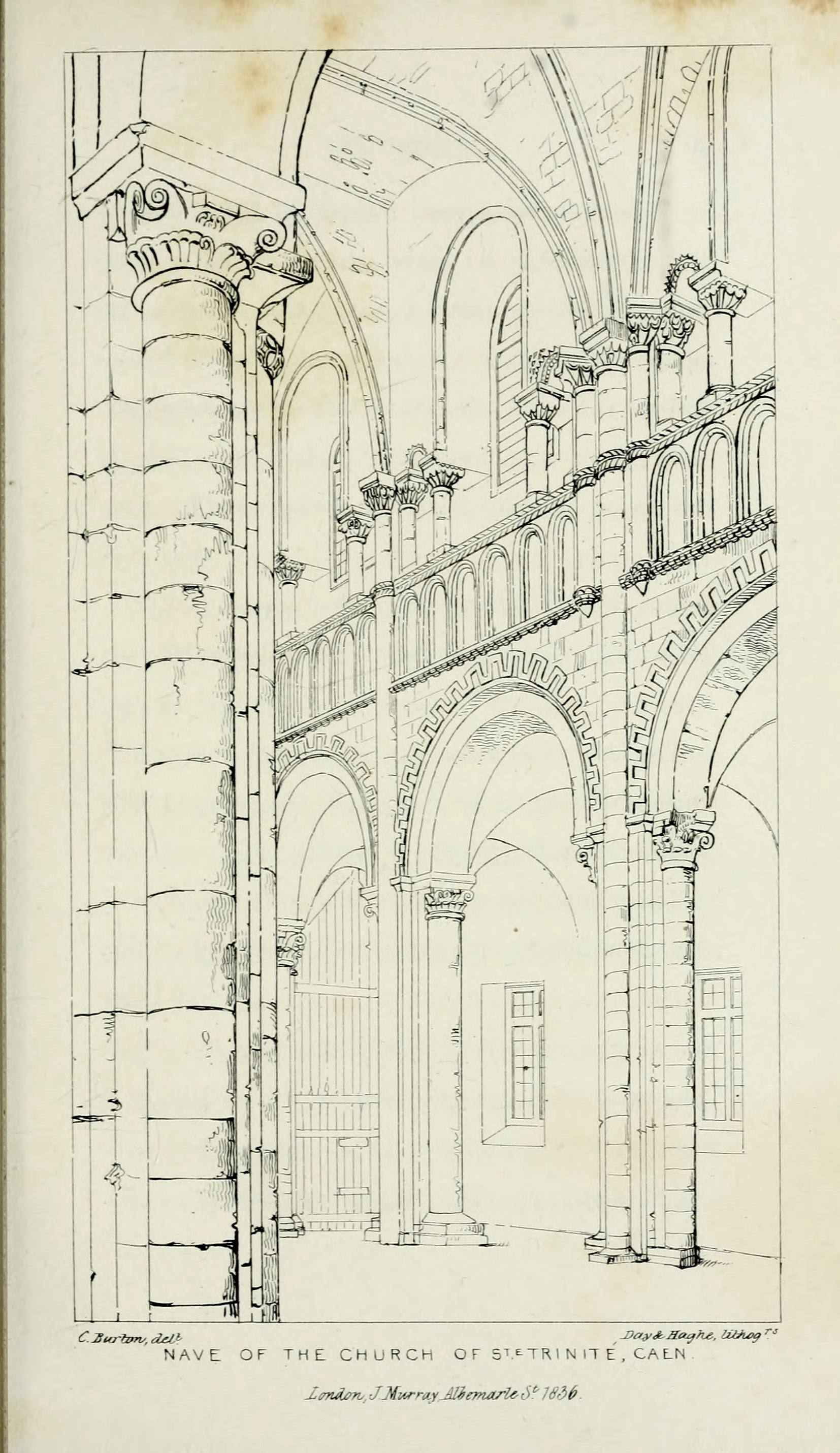
Nave of the Church of St. Trinité Caen, from An architectural tour in Normandy

Knight was the author of several Oriental tales, Ilderim, a Syrian Tale (1816), Phrosyne, a Grecian Tale, and Alashtar, an Arabian Tale (1817).

He was also an authority on architecture, and wrote various works on the subject, including Hannibal in Bithynia, An architectural tour in Normandy (1836), The Normans in Sicily (1838), and The Ecclesiastical Architecture of Italy (1842-4), described by Pevsner as a "sumptuously illustrated sequel to The Normans in Sicily". These books brought him more reputation than his fictions.

Parliament of the United Kingdom
Preceded by Henry Dawkins; Henry Fynes	Member of Parliament for Aldborough; 1814–1815; With: Henry Fynes	Succeeded by Granville Harcourt-Vernon; Henry Fynes
Preceded by Francis Jeffrey; John Charles Ramsden	Member of Parliament for Malton; 1831–1832; With: Francis Jeffrey 1831; Lord Cavendish of Keighley 1831; Charles Pepys 1831–1832	Succeeded by William FitzWilliam; Sir Charles Pepys, Bt
Preceded by Viscount Lumley; Thomas Houldsworth	Member of Parliament for North Nottinghamshire; 1835–1846; With: Thomas Houldsworth	Succeeded by Lord Henry Bentinck; Thomas Houldsworth
