= John Stuart Penton Lumley =

Vascular surgeon (born 1936)

John Stuart Penton Lumley (born September 1936) is a former professor of Vascular Surgery at the University of London and former world president of the International College of Surgeons. He is a councilman of the City of London Corporation, where he represents the ward of Aldersgate. He was a council member of the Royal College of Surgeons, chair of two academic boards of the Worshipful Company of Apothecaries, and has written or edited more than 60 medical textbooks.
