= Richard Lumley-Saunderson, 6th Earl of Scarbrough =

British peer and politician

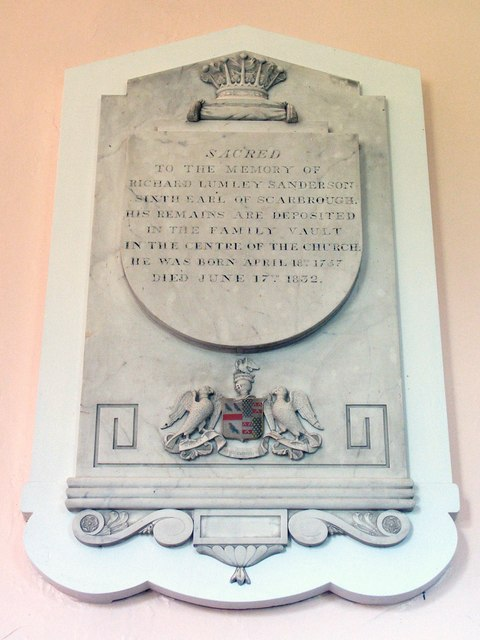
Memorial, St Helen's Saxby, Lincolnshire

Richard Lumley-Saunderson, 6th Earl of Scarbrough (16 April 1757 – 17 June 1832), styled The Honourable Richard Lumley-Saunderson until 1807, was a British peer and politician.

== Background ==
Scarbrough was a younger son of Richard Lumley-Saunderson, 4th Earl of Scarbrough, and Barbara, daughter of Sir George Savile, 7th Baronet and sister and heiress of Sir George Savile, 8th Baronet. He inherited substantial estates (Rufford Abbey and Thornhill Hall) on the death of his maternal uncle in 1784, assuming the additional surname of Savile. When he later inherited his brother's title and estates in 1807 (and gave up his previous inheritance) he replaced the Savile name with Saunderson.

== Career ==
He served in the British Army as a Cornet in the 10th Dragoons ( 1775), was promoted to lieutenant in 1778 and captain in the 86th Foot (1780). He retired in 1784.

He was returned as Member of Parliament for Lincoln in 1784, a seat he held until 1790. In 1807 he succeeded his elder brother in the earldom and entered the House of Lords. He was appointed High Sheriff of Nottinghamshire for 1793–94.

== Family ==
Lord Scarbrough died in June 1832, aged 75. He had married the Hon. Henrietta Willoughby, daughter of Henry Willoughby, 5th Baron Middleton but had no children. He was succeeded by his younger brother, Reverend John Lumley-Savile.

Parliament of Great Britain
Preceded by Robert Vyner; John Fenton-Cawthorne	Member of Parliament for Lincoln; 1784–1790; With: John Fenton-Cawthorne	Succeeded by John Fenton-Cawthorne; Robert Hobart
Peerage of England
Preceded by George Augusta Lumley-Saunderson	Earl of Scarbrough; 1807–1832	Succeeded by John Lumley-Savile
