= Evelyn Denison, 1st Viscount Ossington =

British statesman (1800–1873)

The Right Honourable The Viscount Ossington PC
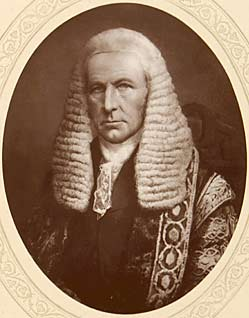

Speaker of the House of Commons of the United Kingdom
- In office 30 April 1857 – 9 February 1872
- Monarch: Victoria
- Prime Minister: Viscount Palmerston; The Earl of Derby; The Earl Russell; Benjamin Disraeli; William Ewart Gladstone
- Preceded by: Sir Charles Shaw-Lefevre
- Succeeded by: Hon. Sir Henry Brand

Personal details
- Born: 27 January 1800 Ossington, Nottinghamshire
- Died: 7 March 1873 (aged 73)
- Party: Whig, Liberal
- Spouse(s): Lady Charlotte Bentinck (d. 1889)
- Education: Christ Church, Oxford

John Evelyn Denison, 1st Viscount Ossington, PC (27 January 1800 – 7 March 1873) was a British statesman who served as Speaker of the House of Commons from 1857 to 1872. He is the eponym of Speaker Denison's rule.

== Background and education ==
Denison was born at Ossington, Nottinghamshire, the eldest son of John Denison (died 1820), and the older brother of Edward Denison, bishop of Salisbury, William Denison, colonial governor in Australia and India, and George Denison, a conservative churchman. He was educated at Eton and Christ Church, Oxford.

== Political career ==
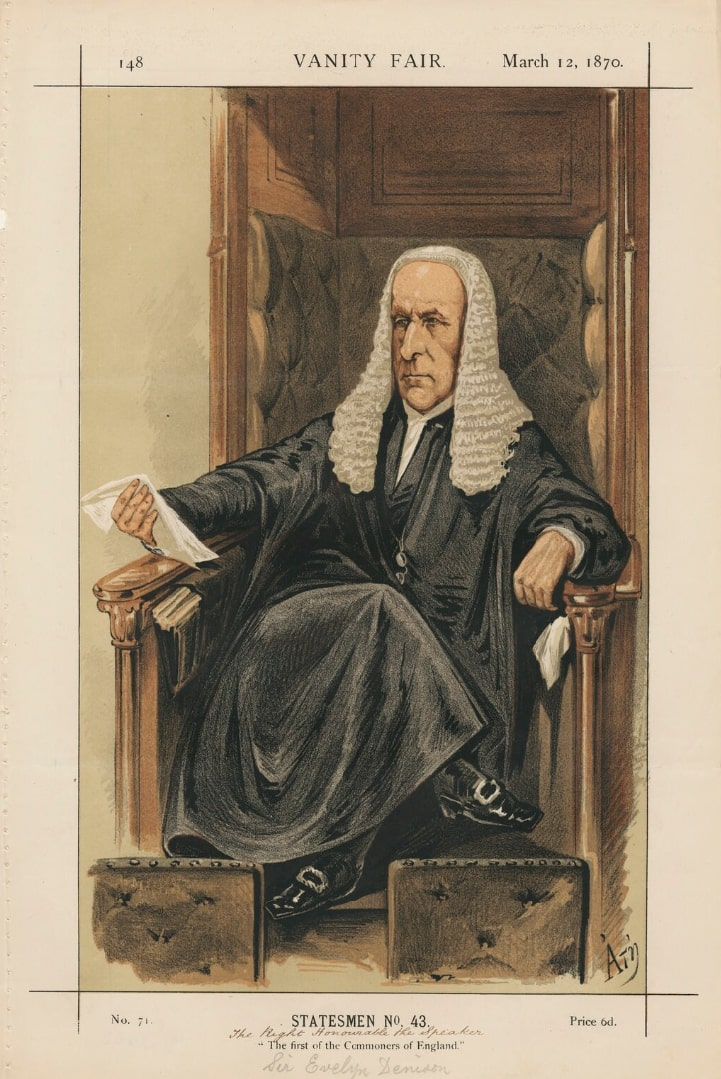
Sir Evelyn Denison, speaker, in a Vanity Fair cartoon of 1870.

A Whig, he became Member of Parliament (MP) for Newcastle-under-Lyme in 1823, being returned for Hastings three years later, and holding for a short time a subordinate position in George Canning's ministry. Defeated in 1830 both at Newcastle-under-Lyme and then at Liverpool, Denison secured a seat as one of the members for Nottinghamshire in 1831. After the Great Reform Act he represented the southern division of Nottinghamshire from 1832 until the general election of 1837. He was appointed High Sheriff of Nottinghamshire for 1839–40.

Denison then represented Malton from 1841 to 1857, and North Nottinghamshire from 1857 to 1872. In April 1857 Denison was chosen Speaker of the House of Commons. He was sworn of the Privy Council at the same time. Re-elected at the beginning of three successive parliaments he retained this position until February 1872, when he resigned and was raised to the peerage as Viscount Ossington, of Ossington in the County of Nottingham. He refused, however, to accept the pension usually given to retiring Speakers. Denison gave an explanation – referred to as Speaker Denison's rule – as to how the Speaker should exercise his or her casting vote in the event of a tie.

== The Speaker's Commentary ==
While in office, Denison formed the view that the public needed a plain, but complete and accurate, explanatory commentary on the Bible, and consulted some of the bishops as to the best way of supplying the work. Eventually the Archbishop of York undertook to organise the production of the commentary, under the editorship of Frederic Charles Cook, Canon of Exeter. A panel was appointed to advise the general Editor, comprising the Archbishop and the Regius Professors of Divinity of Oxford and Cambridge. Formally entitled The Bible Commentary, it became popularly known as "The Speaker's Commentary". It was first published in England, and subsequently in the United States by Charles Scribner's Sons.

== Family ==
Lord Ossington married Lady Charlotte, daughter of William Bentinck, 4th Duke of Portland, in 1827, but he left no children. He died on 7 March 1873, and his title became extinct. Lady Ossington retired to Upper Brook Street and died in 1889.

His Ossington Hall estate passed to his nephew William Evelyn Denison, son of his brother Sir William Thomas Denison.

Ossington Street in London was named in his honour.

== Arms ==
Coat of arms of Evelyn Denison, 1st Viscount Ossington
Crest A dexter arm vested Gules cuffed Argent pointing with the forefinger to an estoile Or. Escutcheon Argent, a bend Gules between a unicorn's head erased in chief and a cross crosslet fitchée in base Azure.

Parliament of the United Kingdom
Preceded by William Kinnersley; Sir Robert Wilmot, Bt	Member of Parliament for Newcastle-under-Lyme; 1823–1826; With: Sir Robert Wilmot, Bt	Succeeded by Richardson Borradaile; Sir Robert Wilmot, Bt
Preceded by Sir William Curtis, Bt; Sir Charles Wetherell	Member of Parliament for Hastings; 1826–1830; With: James Lushington, to 1831; Joseph Planta, from 1831	Succeeded by Sir Henry Fane; Joseph Planta
Preceded by Frank Sotheron; John Lumley	Member of Parliament for Nottinghamshire; 1831–1832; With: John Lumley	Constituency abolished
New constituency	Member of Parliament for South Nottinghamshire; 1832–1837; With: The Earl of Lincoln	Succeeded by The Earl of Lincoln; Lancelot Rolleston
Preceded by Viscount Milton; John Walbanke-Childers	Member of Parliament for Malton; 1841–1857; With: John Walbanke-Childers, to 1846; Viscount Milton, 1846–1847; John Walbanke-Childers, 1847–52; Hon. Charles Wentworth-FitzWilliam, from 1852	Succeeded by James Brown; Hon. Charles Wentworth-FitzWilliam
Preceded by Lord Henry Bentinck; Lord Robert Clinton	Member of Parliament for North Nottinghamshire; 1857–1872; With: Lord Robert Pelham-Clinton, to 1865; Lord Edward Pelham-Clinton, 1865–1868; Frederick Chatfield Smith, from 1868	Succeeded by Hon. George Monckton-Arundell; Frederick Chatfield Smith
Political offices
Preceded by Sir Charles Shaw-Lefevre	Speaker of the House of Commons of the United Kingdom; 1857–1872	Succeeded by Hon. Sir Henry Brand
Peerage of the United Kingdom
New creation	Viscount Ossington; 1872–1873	Extinct
