= Lord Henry Bentinck =

19th-century British politician (1804-1870)

Member of Parliament for North Nottinghamshire
- In office 1846–1857
- Preceded by: Henry Gally Knight
- Succeeded by: Sir Evelyn Denison

Personal details
- Born: 9 June 1804
- Died: 31 December 1870 (aged 66)
- Party: Conservative
- Parents: William Bentinck (father); Henrietta Scott (mother)

Lord Henry William Scott-Bentinck (9 June 1804 – 31 December 1870), known as Lord Henry Bentinck, was a British Conservative Party politician.

== Background ==
Bentinck was the third son of William Bentinck, 4th Duke of Portland, and Henrietta, daughter of Major-General John Scott. William Cavendish-Scott-Bentinck, 5th Duke of Portland and Lord George Bentinck were his elder brothers.

== Political career ==
Bentinck sat as Member of Parliament (MP) for North Nottinghamshire from 1846 to 1857. He was also a Trustee of the British Museum and a well-known hound man.

Despite being an advocate of the abolition of slavery, he nevertheless submitted an unsuccessful claim for £2,411, relating to 46 enslaved Africans on the L'amitie estate, Trinidad.

== Personal life ==
Bentinck died in December 1870, aged 66.

Parliament of the United Kingdom
Preceded by Thomas Houldsworth; Henry Gally-Knight	Member of Parliament for Nottinghamshire North; 1846 – 1857; With: Thomas Houldsworth 1846–1852; Lord Robert Pelham-Clinton 1852–1857	Succeeded by Lord Robert Pelham-Clinton; Sir Evelyn Denison
