= George Monckton-Arundell, 8th Viscount Galway =

British politician

The Right Honourable The Viscount Galway GCMG, DSO, OBE, KStJ, PC
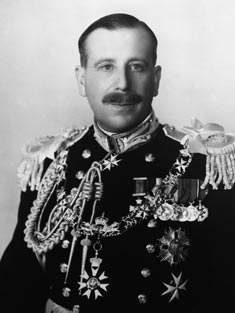

5th Governor-General of New Zealand
- In office 12 April 1935 – 3 February 1941
- Monarchs: George V Edward VIII; George VI
- Prime Minister: George Forbes; Michael Joseph Savage; Peter Fraser
- Preceded by: The Lord Bledisloe
- Succeeded by: The Lord Newall

Personal details
- Born: 24 March 1882 England
- Died: 27 March 1943 (aged 61) Blyth, Nottinghamshire, England
- Education: Christ Church, Oxford

Military service
- Allegiance: United Kingdom
- Branch/service: British Army
- Rank: Colonel
- Battles/wars: First World War
- Awards: Knight Grand Cross of the Order of St Michael and St George; Distinguished Service Order; Officer of the Order of the British Empire; Mentioned in Despatches

George Vere Arundell Monckton-Arundell, 8th Viscount Galway, GCMG, DSO, OBE, KStJ, PC (24 March 1882 – 27 March 1943) was a British politician. He served as the fifth Governor-General of New Zealand from 1935 to 1941.

== Early life ==
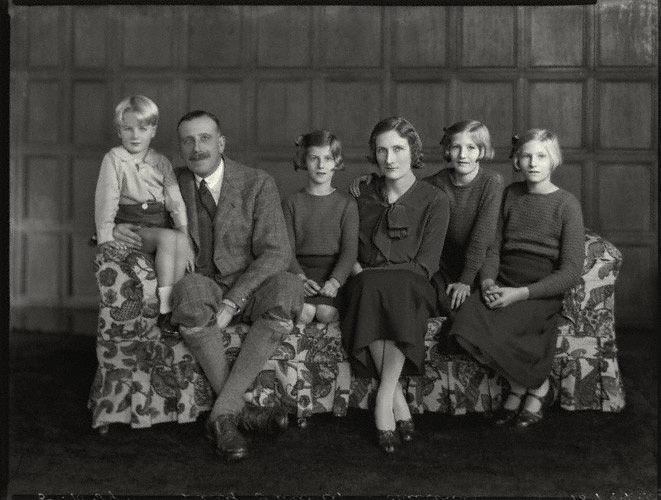
Simon, the 8th Viscount Galway, Isabel, Lucia, Celia and Mary (from left).

George Vere Arundell Monckton-Arundell Galway was born on 24 March 1882.

He received his education at a preparatory school in Berkshire before attending Eton College (1895–1900) and Christ Church College, University of Oxford (1900–1904). He read Modern History and graduated with Bachelor of Arts and took the Master of Arts subsequently (this degree at Oxford, Cambridge and Dublin is an elevation in rank and not a postgraduate qualification).

Lord Galway succeeded his father to the family's Irish peerage in 1931.

== Career ==
=== Military career ===
Monckton-Arundell was commissioned a second lieutenant in the Nottinghamshire (Sherwood Rangers) Yeomanry on 1 January 1900, and promoted to lieutenant on 11 June 1902. In 1904, he joined the First Life Guards, the senior regiment of the British Army that makes up the Household Cavalry, where he rose to the rank of colonel. During the First World War he was appointed as adjutant general and quartermaster general. He was of the Royal Artillery (1933–35). In 1933 he was appointed Colonel Commandant of the Honourable Artillery Company (HAC) until 1935, when he relinquished it on appointment as Governor-General of New Zealand. Upon retirement from his post as governor-general he returned as Colonel Commandant of the HAC until his death. He was also appointed Honorary Colonel of the 7th (Robin Hood) Battalion, Sherwood Foresters (later 42nd (The Robin Hoods, Sherwood Foresters) Anti-Aircraft Battalion, Royal Engineers) in 1933.

=== Political ambitions ===
In 1910, Monckton-Arundell attempted to follow his father into the House of Commons. He contested the Scarborough constituency in the January and December elections of 1910, but was unsuccessful both times.

=== Governor-General of New Zealand ===
Viscount Galway was Governor-General of New Zealand from 12 April 1935 to 3 February 1941. His military background made an impression with cabinet ministers of the time. His term was twice extended because of the Second World War. Viscount Galway and his wife received numerous gifts during his time as governor-general. Some were returned to New Zealand around the time of the sale of the family house Serlby Hall, and were donated to the Museum of New Zealand Te Papa Tongarewa in 1980.

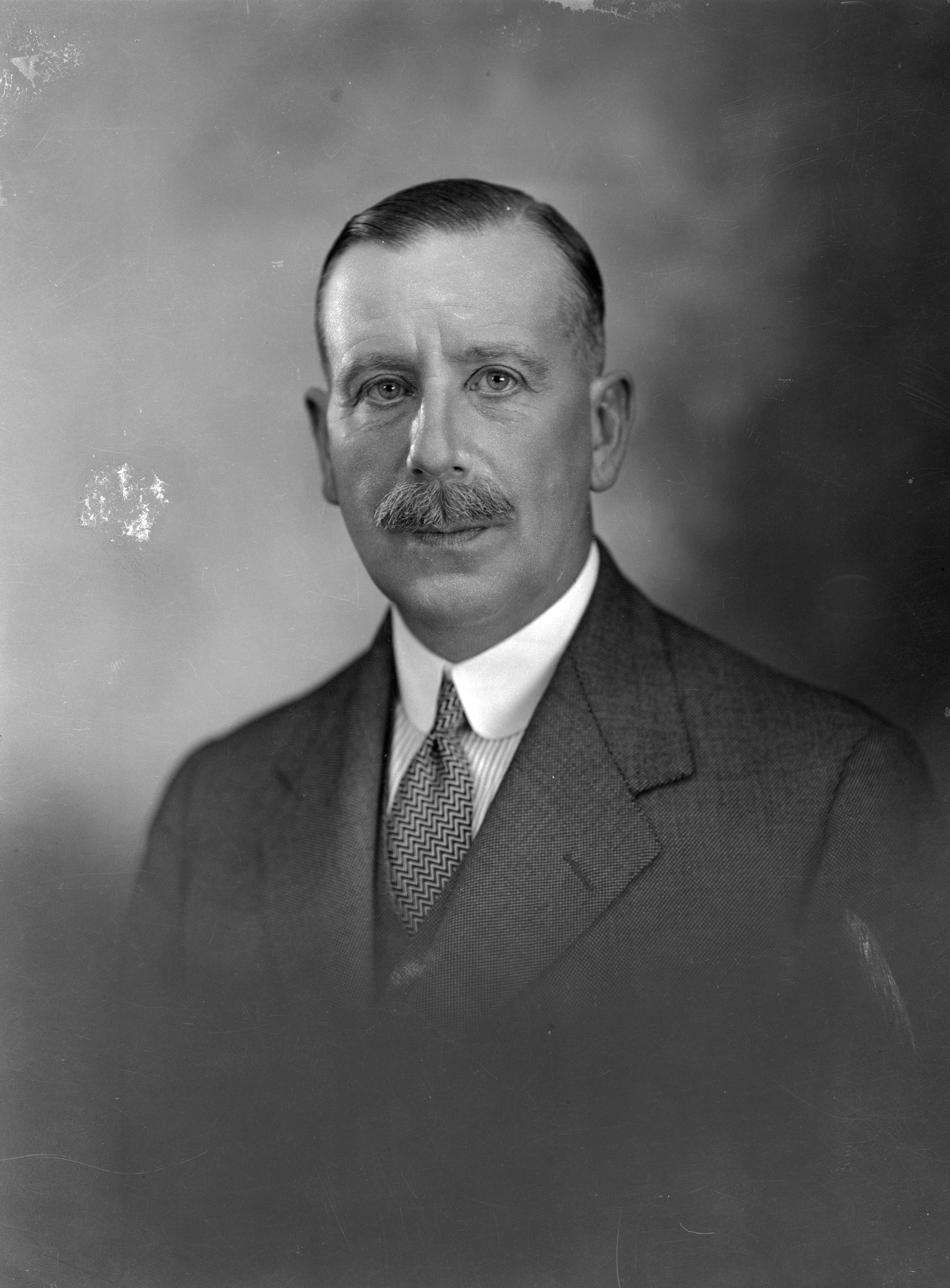
George Monckton-Arundell, photographed by Herman Schmidt, circa 1935

Galway was a freemason. During his term as governor-general, he was also Grand Master of the Grand Lodge of New Zealand. In the 1937 Coronation Honours, he was appointed a member of the Privy Council.

=== Later years ===
Upon his return to England, Galway held the honorary post of Deputy Lord Lieutenant of Nottinghamshire under the 7th Duke of Portland.

== Personal life ==
Viscount Galway married Lucia Margaret White, daughter of the 3rd Baron Annaly, in 1922. They had four children:

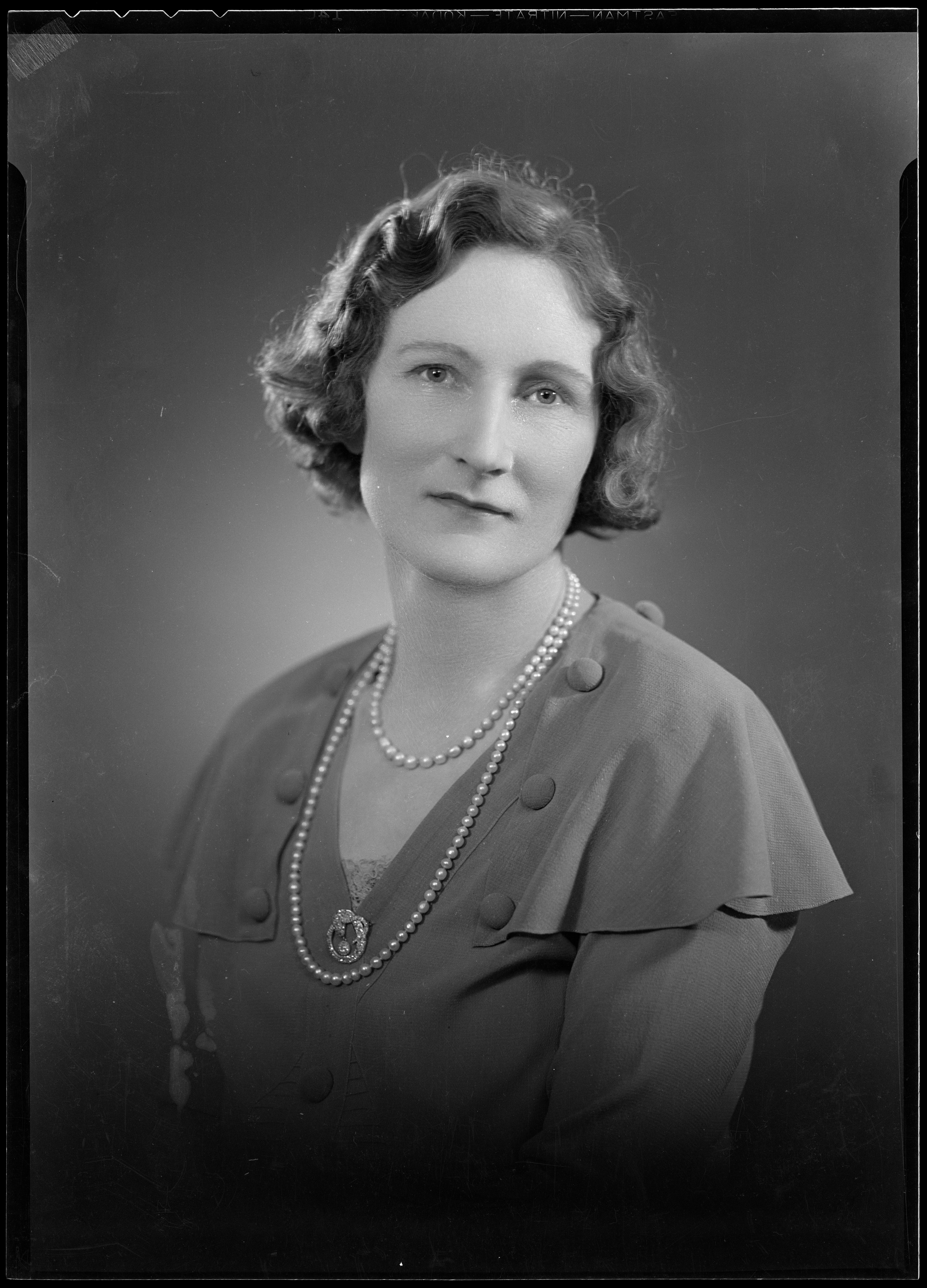
Lady Lucia Galway, 2 November 1935, Wellington, by Spencer Digby Studios. Spencer Digby / Ronald D Woolf Collection. Gift of Ronald Woolf, 1975. Te Papa (B.079987)

- Mary Victoria Monckton (1924–2010), who married David Henry Fetherstonhaugh, son of Lt.-Col. Timothy Fetherstonhaugh, in 1947. They divorced in 1972 and she married Maj. Robert Patricius Chaworth-Musters, son of Col. John Neville Chaworth-Musters, in 1974.
- Celia Ella Vere Monckton (1925–1997), who married Sir Joshua Rowley, 7th Baronet, son of Lt.-Col. Sir Charles Rowley, 6th Baronet, in 1959.
- Isabel Cynthia Monckton (b. 1926), who married John King, Baron King of Wartnaby, son of Albert John King, in 1970.
- Simon George Robert Monckton-Arundell (1929–1971), who married Lady Theresa Jane Fox-Strangways, daughter of Harry Fox-Strangways, 7th Earl of Ilchester, in 1953.

He died suddenly on 27 March 1943 in Blyth.

== Arms ==
Coat of arms of George Monckton-Arundell, 8th Viscount Galway
Notes The arms of George Monckton-Arundell consist of: (Carved depiction) Crest 1st, On a chapeau Azure doubled, turned up Ermine, a swallow Argent (Arundell); 2nd, A martlet Or (Monckton). Escutcheon Quarterly, 1st and 4th Sable, six swallows, three, two and one, Argent (Arundell); 2nd and 3rd Sable, on a chevron, between three martlets Or, as many mullets of the field (Monckton). Supporters Two unicorns Ermine, crined, armed and unguled, each gorged with an Eastern diadem Or. Motto Famam Extendere Factis (To extend my fame by deeds)

Military offices
Preceded by Earl of Denbigh	Colonel Commandant and President, Honourable Artillery Company; 1933–1935	Succeeded by Earl Fortescue
Government offices
Preceded by The Viscount Bledisloe	Governor-General of New Zealand; 1935–1941	Succeeded by Sir Cyril Newall
Peerage of Ireland
Preceded by George Monckton-Arundell	Viscount Galway; 1931–1943	Succeeded by Simon Monckton-Arundell
