= Augustus William Lumley-Savile =

English aristocrat and courtier (1829–1887)

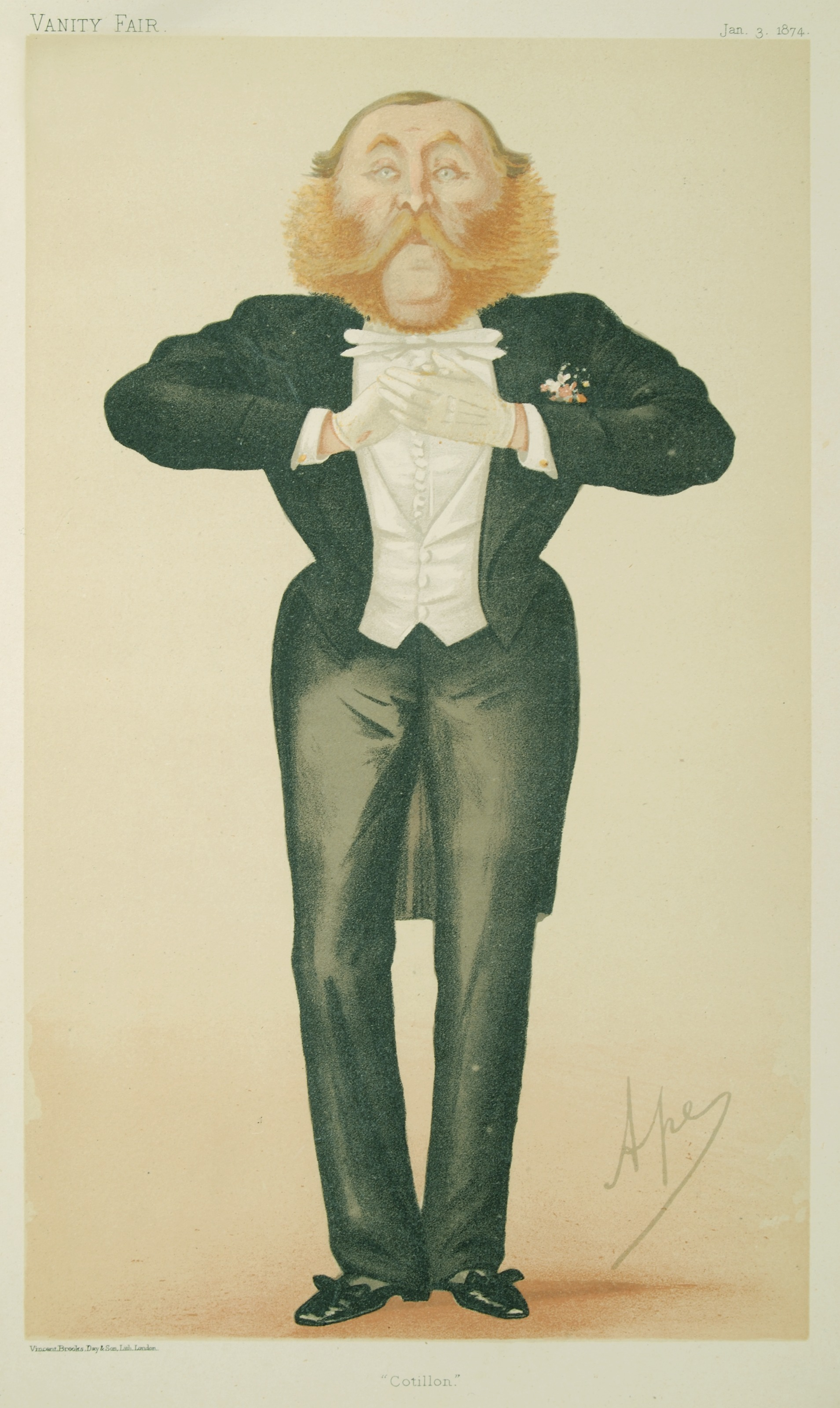
"Cotillon" Caricature of Mr. Augustus William Lumley-Savile by Ape in Vanity Fair, 3 January 1874

Augustus William Lumley-Savile, renamed Augustus William Savile in 1881, (1829, London – 13 April 1887, Cannes) was an English landowner and Her Majesty's Assistant Master of the Ceremonies.

John Lumley-Savile, 8th Earl of Scarbrough was Augustus William Lumley-Savile's father. Lord Scarbrough never married but engendered five natural children, four sons and one daughter. The earl bequeathed the family estates to his second son Captain Henry Lumley (d. 1881), and on Captain Lumley's death the estates passed to Augustus William Lumley-Savile, who was the youngest of the four sons. In 1883 the family estates consisted of 17,820 acres in Nottinghamshire and 16,000 acres in the West Riding of Yorkshire. The principal residence was Rufford Abbey, near Ollerton.

In 1847 Augustus William Lumley-Savile matriculated at Corpus Christi College, Oxford. On 23 November 1849 he became a cornet in a cavalry regiment, the 2nd Regiment of Life Guards. In 1881 by royal licence he dropped the name of Lumley. He served as Queen Victoria's assistant-master of ceremonies from 1881 until his death. When Augustus William Savile died in 1887 the family estates were inherited by his brother John Lumley-Savile, who assumed the surname of Savile only.

Mr. Augustus Savile, so much better known to the world as Augustus Lumley, the foremost leader of cotillons and genius of the ballroom in days gone by, opened his great house at Rufford, most hospitably last week. The sport was good for that county, and some of the guns first-rate—Lord Clarendon, for example, Lord Barrington, and Captain Green. Lord and Lady Grosvenor were there, also Lord and Lady Dorchester, Lord Ormathwaite and his daughter, Mr. Edward Dawson, and Mr. Tyrwhitt-Wilson, besides several others.
