= Lord Robert Clinton =

British Liberal Party politician

Lord Robert Renebald Pelham-Clinton (15 October 1820 – 25 July 1867), known as Lord Robert Clinton, was a British Liberal Party politician.

== Background ==
Clinton was a younger son of Henry Pelham-Clinton, 4th Duke of Newcastle, and Georgiana Elizabeth, daughter of Edward Miller-Mundy. Henry Pelham-Clinton, 5th Duke of Newcastle and Lord Charles Pelham-Clinton were his elder brothers.

== Political career ==
Clinton entered the House of Commons as Member of Parliament (MP) for Nottinghamshire North when he was elected unopposed at the 1852 general election. He was re-elected unopposed at three further general elections, until he stood down at the 1865.

== Personal life ==
In 1847 he volunteered his services gratuitously as an agent for the British Relief Association in Ireland. Pelham-Clinton died in July 1867, aged 46.

Parliament of the United Kingdom
Preceded by Thomas Houldsworth; Lord Henry Bentinck	Member of Parliament for Nottinghamshire North; 1852 – 1865; With: Lord Henry Bentinck 1852–1857; Sir Evelyn Denison 1857–1865	Succeeded by Sir Evelyn Denison; Lord Edward Pelham-Clinton
