= Lord Edward Clinton =

British politician

- Clinton in 1901

Member of Parliament for North Nottinghamshire
- In office July 1865 – November 1868

Personal details
- Born: 11 August 1836
- Died: 9 July 1907 (aged 70)
- Party: Liberal
- Spouse: Matilda Jane Cradock-Hartopp

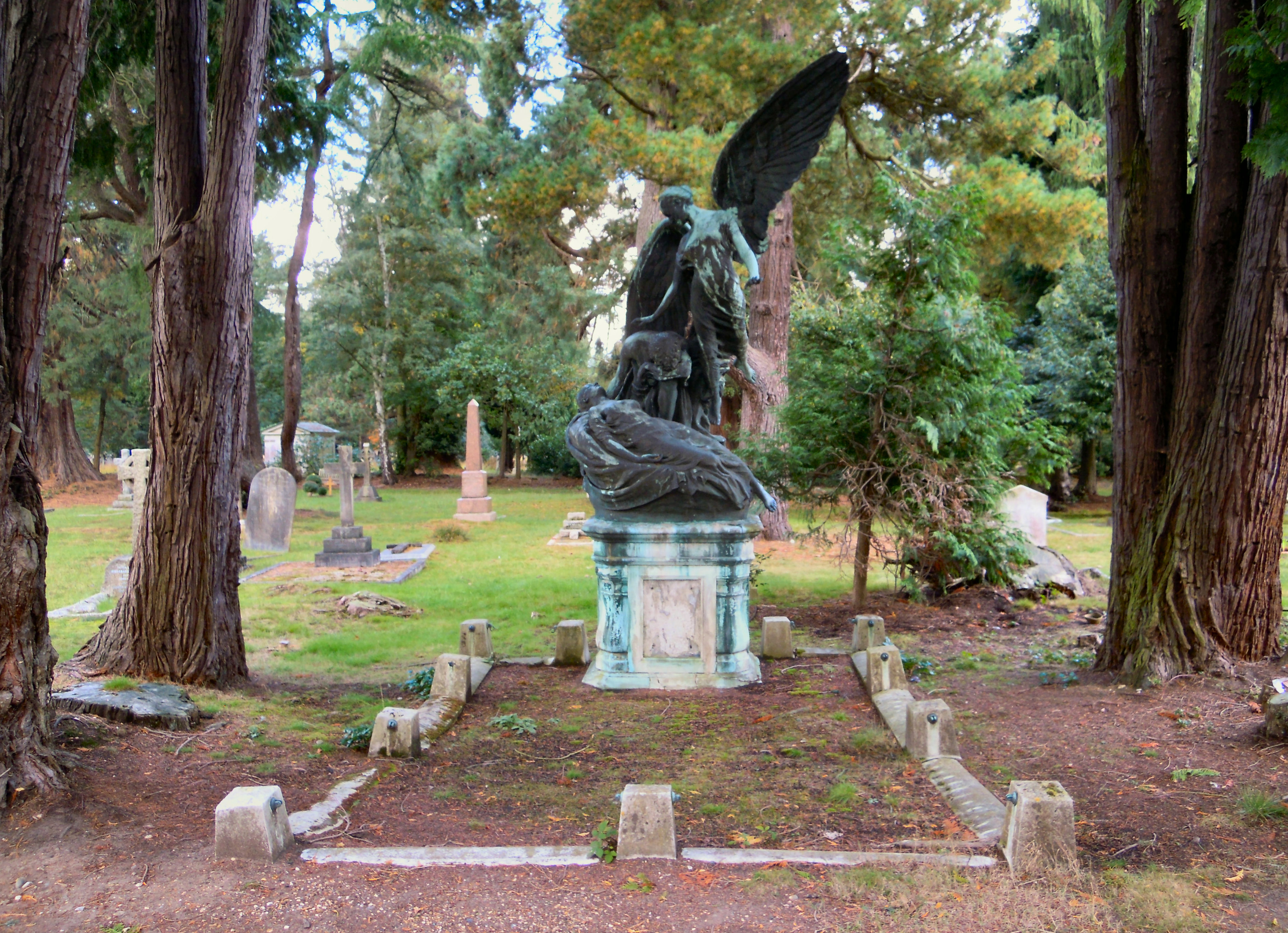
Tomb of Lord Edward and his wife, Brookwood Cemetery

Lieutenant-Colonel Lord Edward William Pelham-Clinton GCVO KCB (11 August 1836 – 9 July 1907), known as Lord Edward Clinton, was a British Liberal Party politician.

== Life ==
Clinton was the second son of Henry Pelham-Clinton, 5th Duke of Newcastle and his wife Lady Susan Hamilton and educated at Eton until 1853.

He joined the Rifle Brigade as an ensign in 1854 and served in the Crimea after the fall of Sebastopol. He reached the rank of captain in 1857 and spent 5 years in Canada (1861–1865). In 1878 he attained the rank of lieutenant colonel and retired in 1880 while posted in India.

Clinton was elected unopposed at the 1865 general election as Member of Parliament for North Nottinghamshire, but did not seek re-election in 1868.

Clinton was Groom-in-Waiting to Queen Victoria from 1881 to 1894, then Master of the Household from September 1894 until her death in January 1901. He then reverted to a Groom-in-Waiting under her successor King Edward VII in 1901 and remained in that post until his death.

On his death he was buried in a tomb in Brookwood Cemetery (Plot 4). The tomb is now Grade II* listed by English Heritage.

== Honours ==
- KCB : Knight Commander of the Most Honourable Order of the Bath - 1896
- GCVO : Knight Grand Cross of the Royal Victorian Order - 2 February 1901
- Prussia - 1st class, Order of the Crown - 1901 - during the visit of Emperor Wilhelm II for the death and funeral of Queen Victoria in January–February 1901

== Family ==
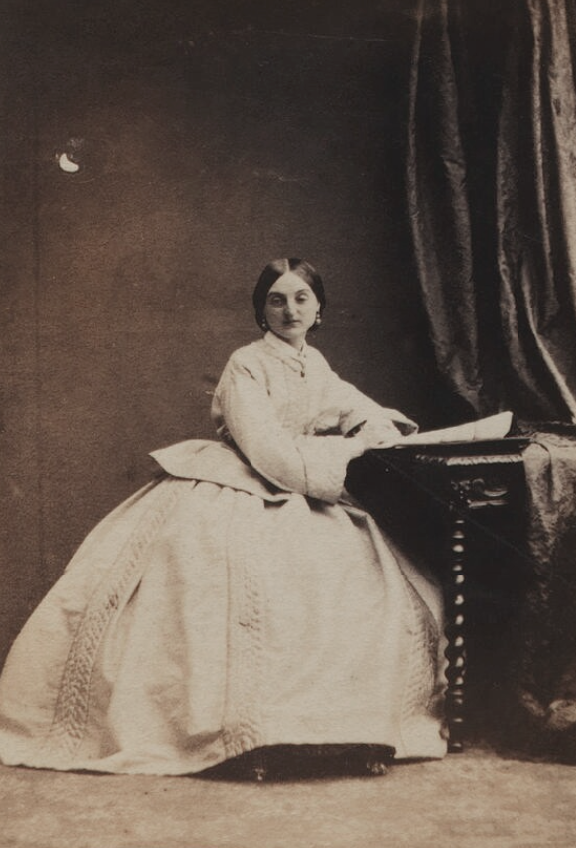
Matilda Jane Cradock-Hartopp, 1860 photograph

On 22 August 1865, Clinton married Matilda Jane Cradock-Hartopp, daughter of Sir William Cradock-Hartopp, 3rd Baronet. The couple had no children.

As a memorial to his wife Clinton reconstructed the chancel of St Gabriel's, Warwick Square at a cost of £1,400, commissioning the architect John Francis Bentley.

Parliament of the United Kingdom
Preceded by Lord Robert Pelham-Clinton; Sir Evelyn Denison	Member of Parliament for North Nottinghamshire; 1865 – 1868; With: Sir Evelyn Denison	Succeeded by Frederick Chatfield Smith; Sir Evelyn Denison
Court offices
Preceded by Sir John Cowell	Master of the Household; 1894–1901	Succeeded by Sir Horace Farquhar
