= John Lumley-Savile, 8th Earl of Scarbrough =

British peer and politician

John Lumley-Savile, 8th Earl of Scarbrough (18 July 1788 – 29 October 1856), styled Viscount Lumley between 1832 and 1835, was a British peer and politician.

== Background ==
Scarbrough was the son of John Lumley-Savile, 7th Earl of Scarbrough, Prebend of York, younger son of Richard Lumley-Saunderson, 4th Earl of Scarbrough, and Barbara, sister and heiress of Sir George Savile, 8th Baronet. His mother was Anna Maria, daughter of Julines Hering. He was educated at St John's College, Cambridge. In 1836 he assumed by Royal licence the additional and principal surname of Savile.

== Political career ==
Scarbrough was returned to Parliament for Nottinghamshire in 1826, a seat he held until 1832, when the constituency was abolished. He then sat for Nottinghamshire North until 1835, when he succeeded his father in the earldom and entered the House of Lords. He also served as Lord Lieutenant of Nottinghamshire from 1839 to 1856.

== Family ==
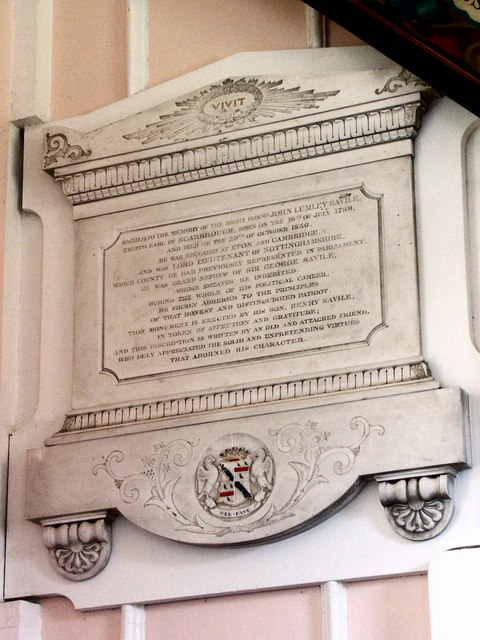
memorial, St Helen's Saxby, Lincolnshire

Lord Scarbrough never married. However, he had five natural children, four sons and one daughter. He bequeathed his large property at Rufford, Nottinghamshire, to his second son Captain Henry Lumley (d. 1881), and on his death they passed to the fourth son, Augustus William Lumley (1829-1887). On the latter's death they were inherited by Lord Scarbrough's eldest natural son by a woman of French origin, John Lumley-Savile, who assumed the surname of Savile only. He was a prominent diplomat and was created Baron Savile in 1888. Lord Scarbrough died in October 1856, aged 68, and was succeeded in the earldom by his first cousin once removed, Richard Lumley.

== Notes ==
Parliament of the United Kingdom
Preceded by Frank Sotheron; Lord William Bentinck	Member of Parliament for Nottinghamshire; 1826–1832; With: Frank Sotheron 1826–1831; Evelyn Denison 1831–1832	Constituency abolished
New constituency	Member of Parliament for Nottinghamshire North; 1832–1835; With: Thomas Houldsworth	Succeeded by Thomas Houldsworth; Henry Gally-Knight
Honorary titles
Preceded by The Duke of Newcastle	Lord Lieutenant of Nottinghamshire; 1839–1856	Succeeded by The Duke of Newcastle
Peerage of England
Preceded by John Lumley-Savile	Earl of Scarbrough; 1835–1856	Succeeded by Richard George Lumley
