= Richard Lumley-Saunderson, 4th Earl of Scarbrough =

British peer

Richard Lumley-Saunderson, 4th Earl of Scarbrough PC (May 1725 – 12 May 1782) was an English peer, styled Viscount Lumley from 1740 to 1752.

He was the first born son of Thomas Lumley-Saunderson, 3rd Earl of Scarbrough, and his wife, Lady Frances Hamilton, the second daughter and coheiress of George Hamilton, 1st Earl of Orkney.

He was appointed a deputy lieutenant of the West Riding of Yorkshire on 4 August 1757. On 27 October 1759, he was appointed colonel of the North Lincolnshire battalion of militia, and was made a deputy lieutenant of Lincolnshire on 30 November 1761.

Scarbrough was Cofferer of the Household and deputy Earl Marshal from 1765 to 1766, and was sworn of the Privy Council in 1765.

== Marriage and succession ==
Scarbrough married Barbara, a daughter of Sir George Savile, 7th Baronet. The couple had six children:

- George Lumley-Saunderson, 5th Earl of Scarbrough (22 September 1753 – 5 September 1807).
- Lady Frances Barbara Lumley-Saunderson (b. 25 February 1756).
- Richard Lumley-Saunderson, 6th Earl of Scarbrough (16 April 1757 – 17 June 1832).
- John Lumley-Savile, 7th Earl of Scarbrough (15 Jun 1760 – 21 February 1835).
  - John Lumley-Savile, 8th Earl of Scarbrough (18 July 1788 – 29 October 1856), five children out-of-wedlock with eldest created Baron Savile.
    - John Savile, 1st Baron Savile (6 January 1818 – 28 November 1896)
- Lady Louisa Lumley-Saunderson, (21 July 1773 – 10 October 1811)
- Frederick Lumley-Savile (17 October 1761 – 20 September 1831).
  - Frederick Lumley-Savile (14 January 1788 – 27 February 1837)
    - Richard Lumley, 9th Earl of Scarbrough (7 May 1813 – 5 December 1884)

Court offices
Preceded by The Earl of Thomond	Cofferer of the Household; 1765–1766	Succeeded by Hans Stanley
Preceded by The Earl of Suffolk	Deputy Earl Marshal; 1765–1777	Succeeded by The Earl of Effingham
Peerage of England
Preceded by Thomas Lumley-Saunderson	Earl of Scarbrough; 1752–1782	Succeeded by George Lumley-Saunderson
