= John Lumley-Savile, 2nd Baron Savile =

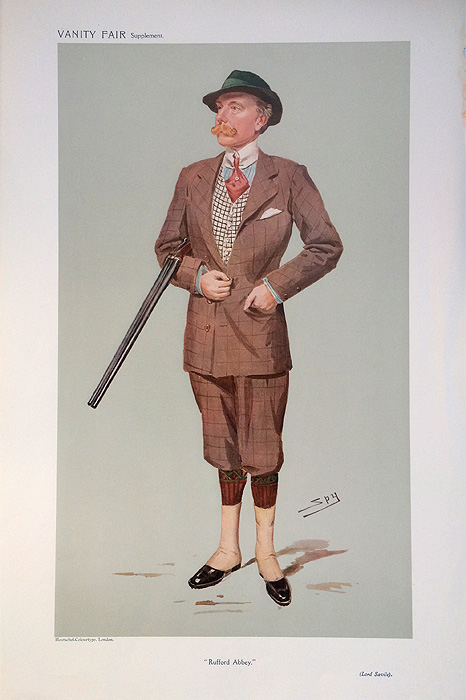
"Rufford Abbey" John Savile Lumley-Savile (2nd Baron Savile) caricatured by Spy in Vanity Fair, 15 April 1908.

John Savile Lumley-Savile, 2nd Baron Savile, KCVO (born John Savile-Lumley; 20 September 1854 – 3 April 1931), was an English landowner, diplomat, and sportsman.

Savile-Lumley was the son of the Rev. Frederick Savile-Lumley, Rector of Bilsthorpe, and nephew of John Savile (1818–1896). The latter was raised to the peerage in 1888 as Baron Savile, of Rufford in the County of Nottingham, with remainder to his nephew John Savile-Lumley (later Lumley-Savile). Lord Savile died in November 1896, aged 78 and was succeeded in the Barony, according to the special remainder, by his nephew John Savile Lumley-Savile, 2nd Baron Savile, who in 1898 assumed by royal license the name of Savile after Lumley.

After education at Eton, Savile-Lumley joined Her Majesty's Diplomatic Service. He was nominated Attaché at Brussels in 1874, became 2nd Secretary in Athens in 1879, exchanged into the Foreign Office in 1881, and retired in 1889. In the early 1900s he owned about 33,900 acres, comprising the family estates in Nottinghamshire and the West Riding of Yorkshire. He enjoyed shooting, fishing, and golf, and often entertained Edward VII at his principal seat, Rufford Abbey.

He was a Justice of the Peace for Nottinghamshire and in 1904 was made KCVO. He married in 1894 but his first wife died in 1912 without issue. He married for the second time in 1916; the marriage produced George Halifax Lumley-Savile, heir to the title. Henry Lumley-Savile (1923–2001) was the younger son from the marriage.

He died on 3 April 1931 at Rufford Abbey.

Peerage of the United Kingdom
Preceded by John Savile	Baron Savile; 1896–1931	Succeeded by George Lumley-Savile
