= John Lumley-Savile, 7th Earl of Scarbrough =

British peer

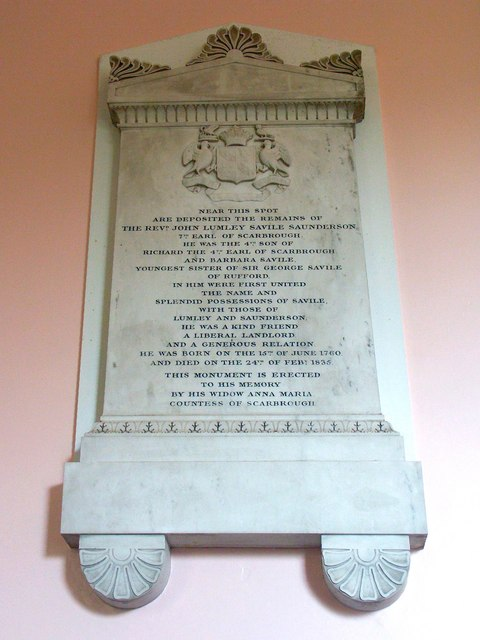
Memorial at St Helen, Saxby, Lincolnshire where he was buried

John Lumley-Savile, 7th Earl of Scarbrough (15 Jun 1760 – 21 February 1835) was a British peer, styled Hon. John Lumley Saunderson until 1807, and Lumley-Savile from 1807 until 1832.

A younger son of Richard Lumley-Saunderson, 4th Earl of Scarbrough, he was educated at Eton and King's College, Cambridge, where he was admitted as John Lumley Saunderson on 31 March 1780 and graduated MA in 1782. In November 1785, he married Anna Maria Herring (d. 1850). He was made a prebendary of York in 1782, and became Rector of Thornhill in 1793. Later Rector of Wintringham, he adopted the additional surname of Savile on 28 September 1807, pursuant to the will of his uncle Sir George Savile, 8th Baronet, when his elder brother Richard Lumley-Saunderson, 6th Earl of Scarbrough inherited the earldom and the Savile estates passed to John.

He inherited the earldom from his brother in 1832. He was succeeded by his son John Lumley-Savile, 8th Earl of Scarbrough.

Peerage of England
Preceded by Richard Lumley-Saunderson	Earl of Scarbrough; 1832–1835	Succeeded by John Lumley-Savile
