= Savile baronets =

Extinct baronetcy in the Baronetage of England

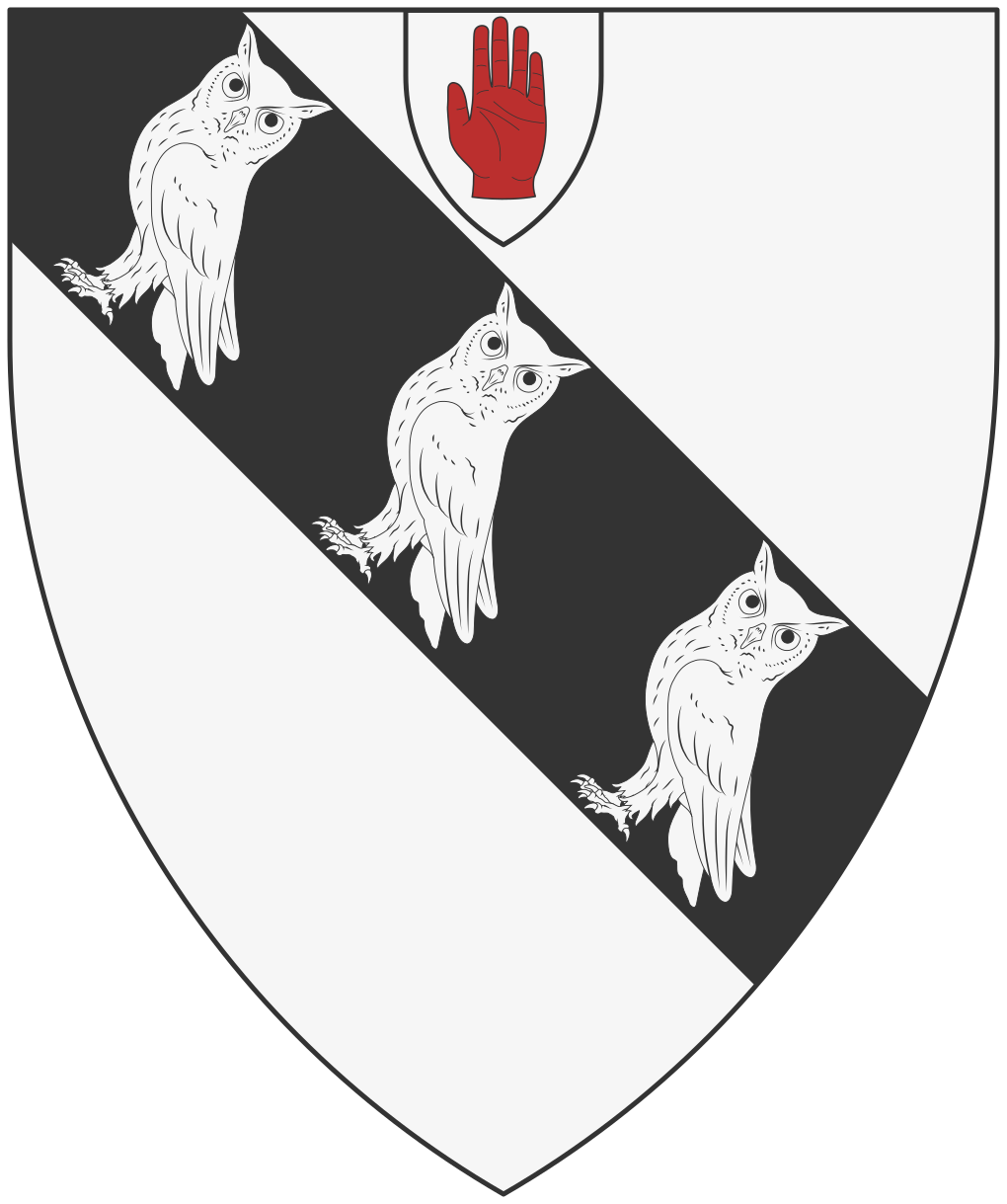
Arms of Savile baronets

There have been three baronetcies created for persons with the surname Savile, all in the Baronetage of England.

The Savile baronetcy, of Thornhill in the County of York, was created on 29 June 1611 for George Savile, MP for Boroughbridge 1586–1587 and Yorkshire 1592. His great-grandson was later created Marquess of Halifax.

The Savile baronetcy, of Methley in the County of York, was created on 29 June 1611 for Henry Savile. He was MP for Aldborough and York. It became extinct on his death.

The Savile baronetcy, of Copley in the County of York, was created 24 July 1662 for John Savile. It became extinct on his death.

== Savile baronets, of Thornhill (1611) ==
- See Marquess of Halifax

== Savile baronets, of Metheley (1611) ==
- Sir Henry Savile, 1st Baronet (1579–1632) – extinct on his death

== Savile baronets, of Copley (1662) ==
- Sir John Savile, 1st Baronet (c. 1640 – 1689) – extinct on his death

Baronetage of England
Preceded by Wortley baronets	Savile baronets of Thornhill; 29 June 1611	Succeeded by Kniveton baronets
Preceded by Harington baronets	Savile baronets of Metheley; 29 June 1611	Succeeded by Willoughby baronets
Preceded by	Savile baronets of Copley; 24 July 1662	Succeeded by
