= Intelligent speed assistance =

System that ensures that road vehicles do not exceed a safe or legally enforced speed

Intelligent speed assistance (ISA), or intelligent speed adaptation, also known as alerting, and intelligent authority, is any system that ensures that vehicle speed does not exceed a safe or legally enforced speed. In case of potential speeding, the driver can be alerted or the speed reduced automatically.

Intelligent speed assistance uses information about the road to determine local speed limits. Information can be obtained from knowledge of the vehicle position, taking into account speed limits known for the position, and by interpreting road features such as signs. ISA systems are designed to detect and alert a driver when a vehicle has entered a new speed zone, or when different speed limits are in force according to time of day and conditions. Many ISA systems provide information about driving hazards, e.g. high pedestrian movement areas, railway crossings, schools, hospitals, etc., and limits enforced by speed and CCTV cameras at traffic lights. The purpose of ISA is to assist the driver to maintain a safe speed.

== History ==
ISA was born in France when Saad and Malaterre (1982) carried out their study of driver behaviour with an in-car speed limiter. Actually, they did not really test Intelligent Speed Adaptation, because the system did not automatically set the correct speed limit; instead drivers had to set the limiter themselves, and, rather like a cruise control, they could set it as they chose. After that there was roughly a ten-year gap until research on ISA was resumed in Sweden in the early 1990s. There followed a series of projects in Sweden, culminating in the large-scale trial of 1999 to 2001, when there were close to 5000 ISA-equipped vehicles on Swedish roads (Biding and Lind, 2002). Most of these vehicles were equipped with an informative or warning version of ISA, but a few hundred used an intervening system, being fitted with a haptic throttle, whereby the accelerator pedal became stiffer when the speed limit was exceeded. A kick-down function was provided to allow drivers to overcome this resistance.

— Intelligent Speed Adaptation Literature Review and Scoping Study January 2006 Project Partners: The University of Leeds and MIRA Ltd Project funded by Transport for London

After ISA regulation entered into force in the EU on 8 July 2022, a speed limiter ISA law entered into force in the UK on 6 July. Regulation did not enter into force the same day, due to Brexit.

== Terminology ==
Intelligent speed adaptation is the terminology of the British Standards Institute, while the EU refers to intelligent speed assistance, in regulation (EU) 2019/2144 of the European Parliament.

== Active and passive ISA ==
Passive systems warn the driver when the vehicle is travelling in excess of the speed limit. Active systems slow the vehicle's speed to conform with the speed limit. Passive systems allow the driver to make a choice on what action should be taken. These systems usually display visual or auditory cues and warnings, which and may include tactile cues such as vibration in the accelerator pedal. Some passive ISA technology trials have made the accelerator pedal stiffer, to alert the driver.

Most active ISA systems allow the driver to override the ISA when deemed necessary. This is thought to enhance public acceptance and safety, but leaves a significant amount of speeding unchecked.

Both active and passive ISA systems can serve as on-board vehicle data recorders, retaining information about vehicle location and performance, for later checking and fleet management purposes.

== Speed and location determination and verification ==
There are four types of technology available for determining local speed limits on a road and the speed of the vehicle:

- Position-based systems
- Radio beacons
- Optical recognition
- Dead reckoning

=== Position-based systems ===
GPS like other satellite navigation systems is based on a network of satellites that constantly transmit radio signals. GPS receivers pick up these transmissions and compare the signals from several satellites in order to pinpoint the receiver's location to within a few meters. This is done by comparing the time at which the signal was sent from the satellite to when it was picked up by the receiver. Because the orbital paths of the satellites are known, the receiver can perform a calculation based on its distance to several of the orbiting satellites and therefore obtain its position. There are currently 31 satellites making up the GPS network, and their orbits are configured so that a minimum of five satellites are available at any one time for terrestrial users.

=== Radio beacons ===
Roadside radio beacons, or bollards, work by transmitting data to a receiver in the car. The beacons constantly transmit data that the car-mounted receiver picks up as it passes each beacon. This data could include local speed limits, school zones, variable speed limits, or traffic warnings. If sufficient numbers of beacons were placed at regular intervals, they could calculate vehicle speed based on how many beacons the vehicle passed per second.

Beacons could be placed in/on speed signs, utility poles, other roadside fixtures, or in the road itself. Mobile beacons could be deployed in order to override fixed beacons for use around accident scenes, during poor weather, or during special events. Beacons could be linked to a main computer so that quick changes could be made.

The use of radio beacons is common when ISA systems are used, to control vehicle speeds in off-road situations, such as factory sites, logistics and storage centres, where occupational health and safety requirements mean that very low vehicle speeds are required in the vicinity of workers, and in situations of limited or obscured visibility.

=== Optical recognition systems ===
Optical recognition technology has focused on recognizing speed signs, road markings and roadside objects such as "cat's eyes". This system requires the vehicle to pass a speed sign or similar indicator and for data about the sign or indicator to be registered by a scanner or a camera system. As the system recognizes a sign, the speed limit data is obtained and compared to the vehicle's speed. The system uses that speed limit until it detects a speed sign with a different limit.

It is also possible to use computer vision to determine the assured clear distance ahead.

=== Dead reckoning ===
Dead reckoning (DR) uses a mechanical system linked to the vehicle's driving assembly in order to predict the path taken by the vehicle. By measuring the rotation of the road wheels over time, a fairly precise estimation of the vehicle's speed and distance travelled can be made. Dead reckoning requires the vehicle to begin at a known, fixed point. Then, by combining speed and distance data with factors such as the angle of the steering wheel and feedback from specialized sensors, e.g., accelerometers, flux gate compass, gyroscope, it can plot the path taken by the vehicle.

By overlaying this path onto a digital map, the DR system knows approximately where the vehicle is, what the local speed limit is, and the speed at which the vehicle is travelling. The system can then use information provided by the digital map to warn of upcoming hazards or points of interest, and to provide warnings if the speed limit is exceeded.

Dead reckoning is prone to cumulative measurement errors, such as variations between the assumed circumference of the tyres compared to the actual dimension, which is used to calculate vehicle speed and distance travelled. These variations in the tyre circumference can be due to wear, or variations in tyre pressure due to variations in speed, payload, or ambient temperature. Other measurement errors are accumulated when the vehicle navigates gradual curves that inertial sensors, gyroscopes and/or accelerometers, are not sensitive enough to detect, or due to electromagnetic influences on magnetic flux compasses, from passing under power lines or when travelling across a steel bridge, and through underpasses and road tunnels.

Some top-end GPS-based navigation systems currently on the market use dead reckoning as a backup system in case the GPS signal is lost.

== Limitations and objections ==
A principle limitation to ISA is that it could result in driving to the posted speed limit rather than local conditions. Road features such as curves and gradients may require a lower speed than the posted maximum speed limit. Some studies of ISA do not support this objection.

Increasingly, road authorities indicate the appropriate speed for such segments through the use of advisory speed signage to alert drivers on approach that there are features which require a reduction in travelling speed. It is recognised that the speed limit databases used in ISA systems should ideally take account of posted advisory speeds as well as posted maximum speed limits. The New South Wales ISA trial in the Illwarra region south of Sydney currently is the only trial to post advisory speeds as well as posted maximum speed limits.

Some car manufacturers have expressed concern that some types of speed limiters take control away from the driver. Some ISA systems do have provision for over-ride by the driver in the event that the set speed is inappropriate.

For some traffic safety practitioners, active intelligent speed adaptation is thought to be an example of 'hard automation', an approach to automation that has been largely discredited by the Human Factors community. An inviolable characteristic of human users is that they will adapt to these systems, often in unpredictable ways. Some studies have shown that drivers 'drive up to the limits' of the system and drive at the set speed, compared to when they are in manual control, where they have been shown to slow down. Conversely, the experience of some drivers with driving under an active ISA system has been that they find they can pay more attention to the roadway and road environment, as they no longer need to monitor the speedometer and adjust their speeds on a continuing basis.

Intelligent speed adaptation has been held as an example of a technology which, like speed cameras, can alienate some drivers, forming a significant barrier to its widespread adoption.

Some studies which pre-date the development of ISA systems indicated that drivers make relatively little use of the speedometer and instead use auditory cues (such as engine and road noise) to successfully regulate their speed.

ISA regulations may prompt the disappearance of models that cannot be re-designed to accommodate the necessary sensors. For example, Toyota's GR86 will go off sale in Europe after 2024, as its existing roofline cannot accommodate an ISA sensor.

If speed signs are not present, an ISA system may be unable to function. This is a particular problem when exiting a side road onto a main road, as the vehicle may not pass a speed sign for some distance. Driving between alternate countries using metric and imperial systems may be a further challenge.

== Benefits ==
A 2012 British study estimated that ISA could reduce road fatalities by half.

A 2010, RTA (NSW Australia) ISA trial, showed that the benefits of ISA are improved speed zone compliance, with a reduction in the level and duration of speeding.

An April 2010 cost-benefit analysis of ISA, in Australia, published by the Centre for Automotive Safety Research, suggested that advisory ISA would reduce injuries by 7.7% and save $1.2 billion per year. Supportive ISA would reduce injuries by 15.1% and save $2.2 billion per year. Limiting ISA would reduce injuries by 26.4% and save $3.7 billion. This research resulted in a recommendation for wider adoption and promotion of ISA in the Australian National Road Safety Strategy 2011–2020.

Real and perceived benefits of ISA include noise reduction and exhaust emissions.

== Commercial use ==
ISA is in widespread commercial use in Australia, partly due to initiatives from by various state road authorities and the inclusion of ISA in the National and State Road Safety Strategies.

In the EU, commercial vehicles such as the 2022 EU-spec Volkswagen Amarok can be bought with ISA.

== EU and UK implementation ==
=== Definition under EU law ===
Under EU regulation, intelligent speed assistance (ISA) system shall comprise a speed limit information function (SLIF) and either a speed limit warning function (SLWF) or a speed control function (SCF):

Intelligent speed assistance shall meet the following minimum requirements:

(a) it shall be possible for the driver to be made aware through the accelerator control, or through dedicated, appropriate and effective feedback, that the applicable speed limit is exceeded;

(b) it shall be possible to switch off the system; information about the speed limit may still be provided, and intelligent speed assistance shall be in normal operation mode upon each activation of the vehicle master control switch;

(c) the dedicated and appropriate feedback shall be based on speed limit information obtained through the observation of road signs and signals, based on infrastructure signals or electronic map data, or both, made available in-vehicle;

(d) it shall not affect the possibility, for the drivers, of exceeding the system’s prompted vehicle speed;

(e) its performance targets shall be set in order to avoid or minimise the error rate under real driving conditions.

— Regulation (EU) 2019/2144 of the European Parliament

=== Mandatory in EU for new vehicles from July 2022 ===
In 2012, five out of the 35 governments associated with the ETSC agreed to introduce ISA in all commercial vehicles.

By 2013, adoption of the technology was being considered by the European Commission but was being strongly opposed by UK Transport Secretary Patrick McLoughlin. A government spokesman described the proposal as "Big Brother nannying by EU bureaucrats". In 2019, it was agreed to adopt the new technology in all new cars from July 2022. The framework for testing ISA systems is currently being defined.

The framework for testing ISA systems is specified by regulation 2021/1958 from 23 June 2021.

=== Criticism of EU regulation ===
In September 2020, the European Transport Safety Council (ETSC) made three criticisms of European draft regulations for ISA:

- ISA systems alerted drivers only after they speed, rather than before
- Systems may not be able to identify the correct speed limit
- Some ISA systems may be disabled too easily

In July 2022, the ETSC restated those reservations, and broadly welcomed ISA, describing it as "a giant leap forward... one of the life-saving systems with the most potential".

=== United Kingdom ===
The UK has inherited the EU law.

Amendment and Transitional Provisions (EU Exit) plan to revoke Regulation (EU) 2019/2144 of the European Parliament and of the Council.

ISA is not yet mandatory in the United Kingdom.

== See also ==
- Advanced driver-assistance systems
- Intelligent transportation system
- Intelligent vehicle technologies
- Map database management
- Speed limiter
- Telematics
- Traffic sign recognition
- Usage-based insurance
