= 1967 West Derbyshire by-election =

UK parliamentary by-election

The 1967 West Derbyshire by-election for the British House of Commons took place on 23 November 1967. It was caused by the resignation of Conservative Member of Parliament (MP) Aidan Crawley to become Chairman of London Weekend Television where he remained until 1973. The seat was retained for the Conservatives by James Scott-Hopkins with a majority of 10,623 over the Liberal candidate Aza Pinney (5,696 votes). Labour's Robin Corbett came third with 5,284 and an Independent, Robert Goodall (who had contested the seat twice before in 1944 and 1945), was fourth with 1,496 votes - losing his deposit.

The election was a low-key affair because there had been an outbreak of foot-and-mouth disease in the area and restrictions had been placed on vehicle movement, with the effect of keeping the usual loud-speaker vans and cars offering lifts to the polls off the roads. Also, many farmers and their families and workers were expected to stay in their farms on polling day and it was not possible for the parties to bring in much help from outside the constituency. Turnout was actually 64.6% as compared to 83.4% at the previous general election (1966).

The result was a blow to the Labour government with the Tories doubling the size of their majority and achieving a swing of 13% against Labour. The Liberals also took heart from the result as they were able to leapfrog Labour into second place improving their share of the poll from 13.2% at the previous general election to 19.8%. Their candidate, Aza Pinney, claimed that fog on election night had prevented some of the support they were expecting to come out to vote. Mr Pinney, a Dorsetshire farmer, was later selected as Liberal candidate for West Devon and was appointed organiser of the Liberals' campaign for the European referendum. The main points of his campaign were industrial democracy, membership of the Common Market and reducing overseas defence costs.

== Result ==
West Derbyshire by-election, 1967
Party	Candidate	Votes	%	±%
Conservative	James Scott-Hopkins	16,319	56.7	+7.1
Liberal	Aza Pinney	5,696	19.8	+6.6
Labour	Robin Corbett	5,284	18.4	−18.9
Independent	Robert Goodall	1,496	5.2	New
Majority		10,623	36.9	+24.5
Turnout		28,795	64.5	−18.9
Conservative hold		Swing	+13.0	

== See also ==
- 1891 West Derbyshire by-election
- 1900 West Derbyshire by-election
- 1986 West Derbyshire by-election
