= BMW 5 Series (F10) =

Sixth generation of BMW 5 Series

BMW 5 Series (F10/F11/F07/F18)
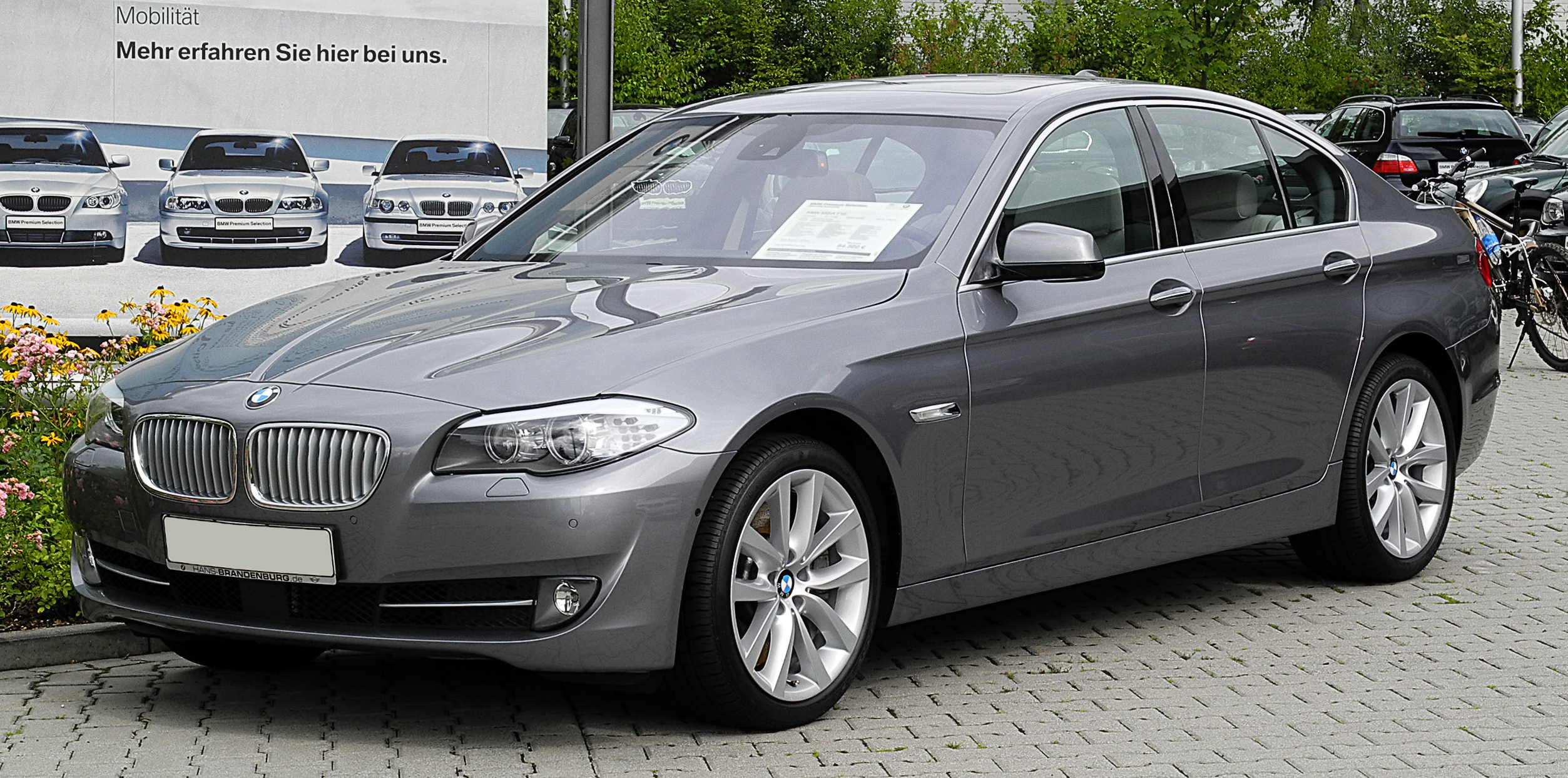

Overview
- Manufacturer: BMW
- Model code: F10 (saloon); F11 (Touring); F07 (Gran Turismo); F18 (LWB)
- Production: September 2009–2016
- Model years: 2010–2017
- Assembly: Germany: Dingolfing (Plant Dingolfing); China: Shenyang (BBA); Mexico: Toluca (BMW Mexico); India: Chennai (BMW India); Thailand: Rayong (BMW Thailand); Indonesia: Jakarta (Gaya Motor); Malaysia: Kulim, Kedah (Inokom); Egypt: Cairo (BAG); Russia: Kaliningrad (Avtotor)
- Designer: Jacek Fröhlich (sedan: 2006); Jean-Francois Huet (Touring); Christopher Weil (Gran Turismo)

Body and chassis
- Class: Executive car (E)
- Body style: 4-door saloon (F10); 4-door LWB saloon (F18); 5-door estate (F11); 5-door fastback (F07)
- Layout: Front-engine, rear-wheel-drive; Front-engine, all-wheel drive (xDrive)
- Platform: BMW L6
- Related: BMW M5 (F10); BMW 7 Series (F01); BMW 6 Series (F12); BMW X5 (F15); VinFast LUX A2.0

Powertrain
- Engine: Petrol: 1.6-2.0 L N20 turbo I4; 2.5–3.0 L N52/N53 I6; 3.0 L N55 turbo I6; 4.4 L N63 twin turbo V8; Diesel (turbocharged): 2.0 L N47/B47 I4; 3.0 L N57 I6
- Transmission: 6-speed manual; 7-speed dual clutch; 8-speed ZF 8HP automatic
- Hybrid drivetrain: ActiveHybrid (ActiveHybrid 5) Plugin (530 Le)

Dimensions
- Wheelbase: 2,968 mm (116.9 in)
- Length: 4,899–5,039 mm (192.9–198.4 in)
- Width: 1,860 mm (73.2 in)
- Height: 1,460 mm (57.5 in)
- Kerb weight: 1,700–1,935 kg (3,747.9–4,265.9 lb)

Chronology
- Predecessor: BMW 5 Series (E60)
- Successor: BMW 5 Series (G30); BMW 6 Series Gran Turismo (F07)

The sixth generation of the BMW 5 Series consists of the BMW F10 (saloon version), F18 (long-wheelbase saloon), BMW F11 (estate, marketed as Touring) and BMW F07 (fastback/hatchback, marketed as Gran Turismo) executive cars, and was produced by BMW from January 2010 (for the 2011 model year) to 2017. The F10 was launched on 20 March 2010 to domestic market and the F11 in summer 2010. The F07 Gran Turismo was produced from early September 2009 to 2017, being launched in the domestic German market in late October 2009.

The F10 5 Series shares a platform with the F01 7 Series full-size luxury saloon, and the F12 6 Series executive-sized grand tourer. The F10 generation is the first 5 Series to offer a hybrid drivetrain, a turbocharged V8 engine, an 8-speed automatic transmission, a dual-clutch transmission (in the M5), active rear-wheel steering (called "Integral Active Steering"), electric power steering, double-wishbone front suspension, an LCD instrument cluster (called "Black Panel Display"), and automatic parking (called "Parking Assistant"). A long-wheelbase saloon version (model code F18) was sold in China, Mexico, Turkey and the Middle East. Introduced in 2011, the M5 model is powered by the BMW S63 twin-turbocharged V8 engine coupled to a 7-speed dual clutch transmission. The Gran Turismo (F07) is the first and only 5 Series to be produced in a fastback body style with a hatchback boot opening.

In February 2017, the G30 5 Series was released as the successor to the F10. Based on the G30 platform, the G32 6 Series Gran Turismo succeeded the F07.

== Development ==
From November 2005 to December 2006, the exterior was designed by Jacek Fröhlich under the leadership of BMW Group Design Director Adrian van Hooydonk. The Touring version was designed by Jean-Francois Alexandre Huet. The Gran Turismo version was designed by Christopher Weil.

The F10 was unveiled in Munich on 23 November 2009.

== Body styles ==
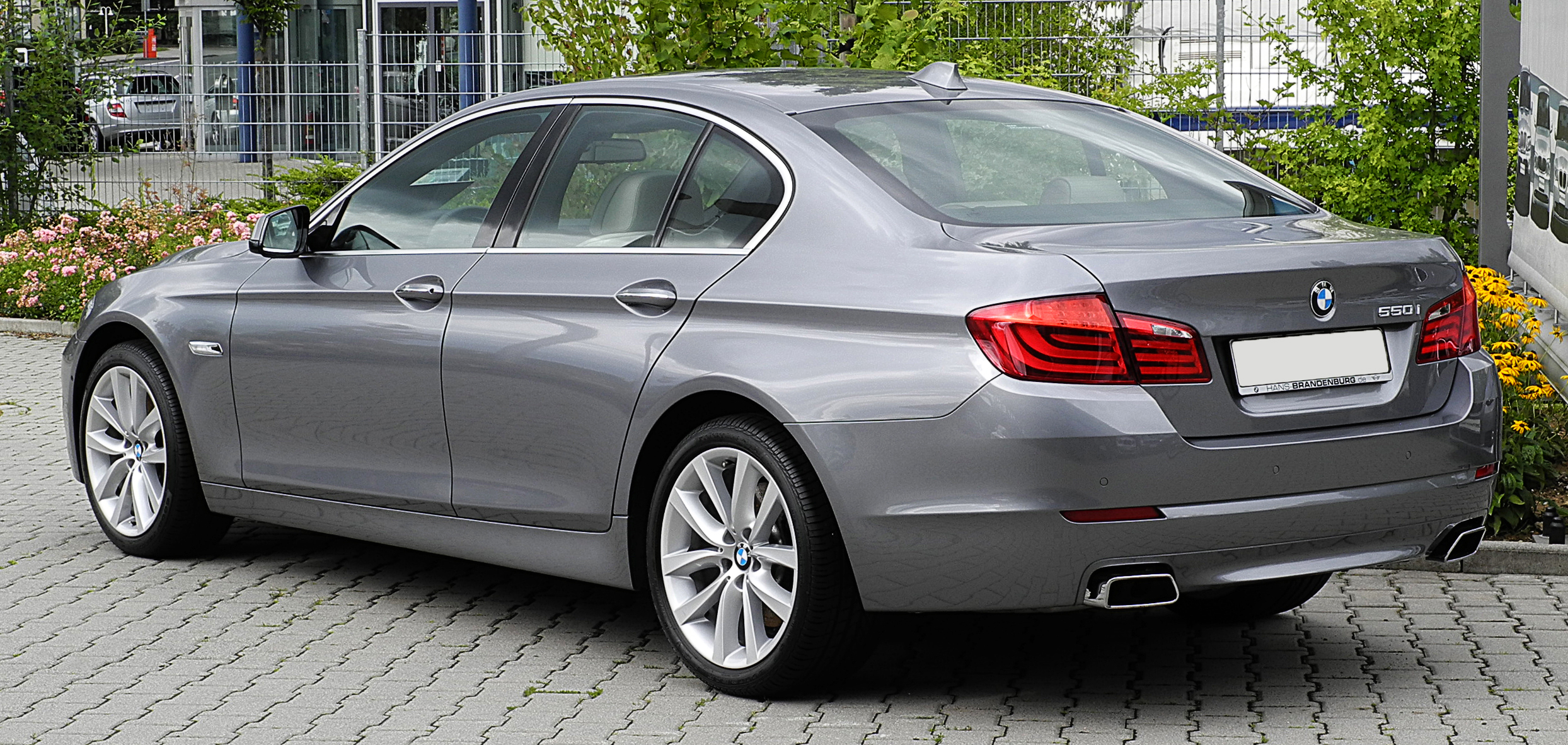
F10 Saloon

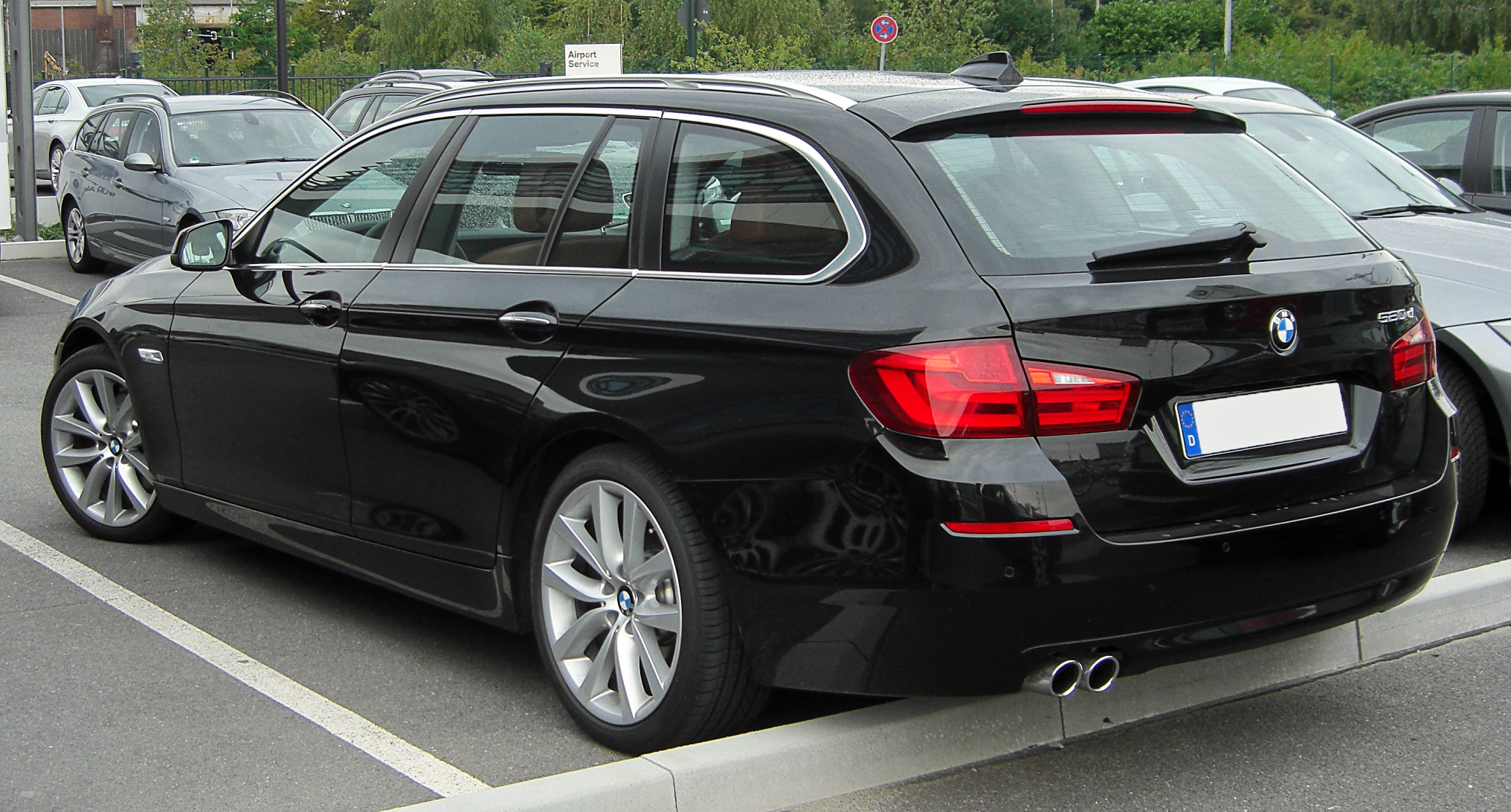
F11 Touring

F07 Gran Turismo (rear)

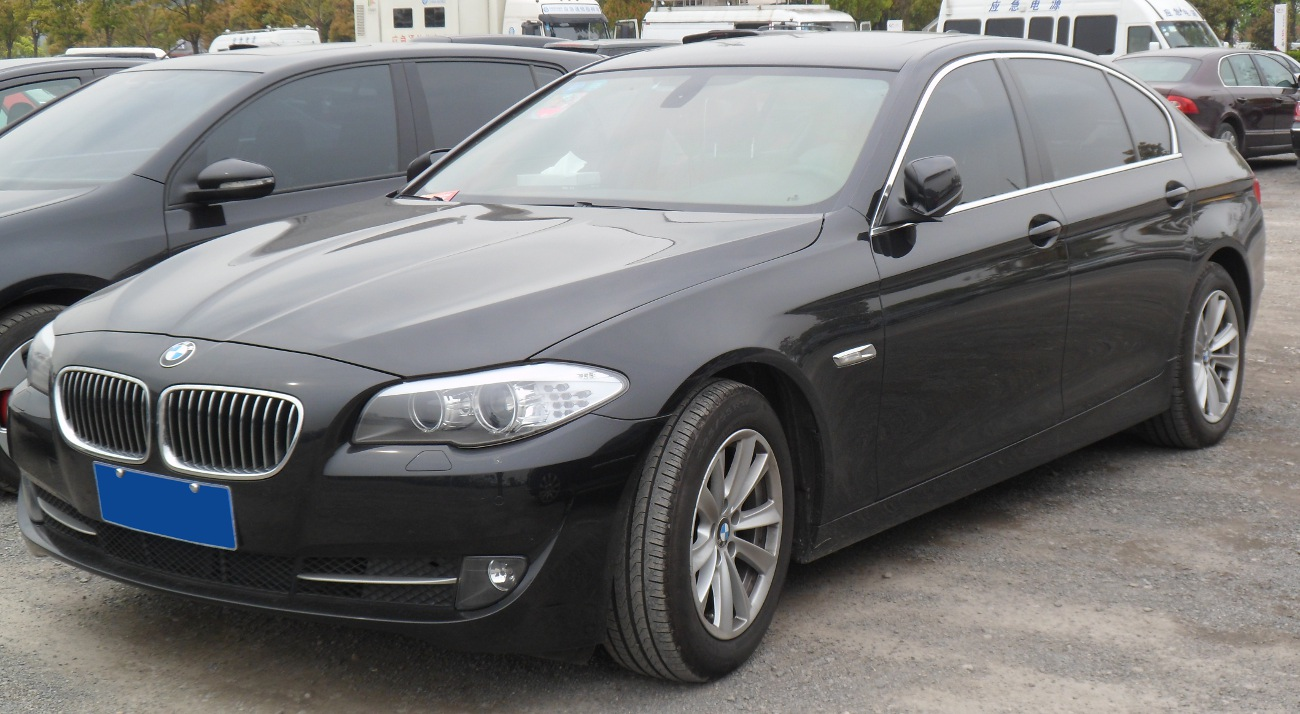
F18 Long Wheelbase Saloon

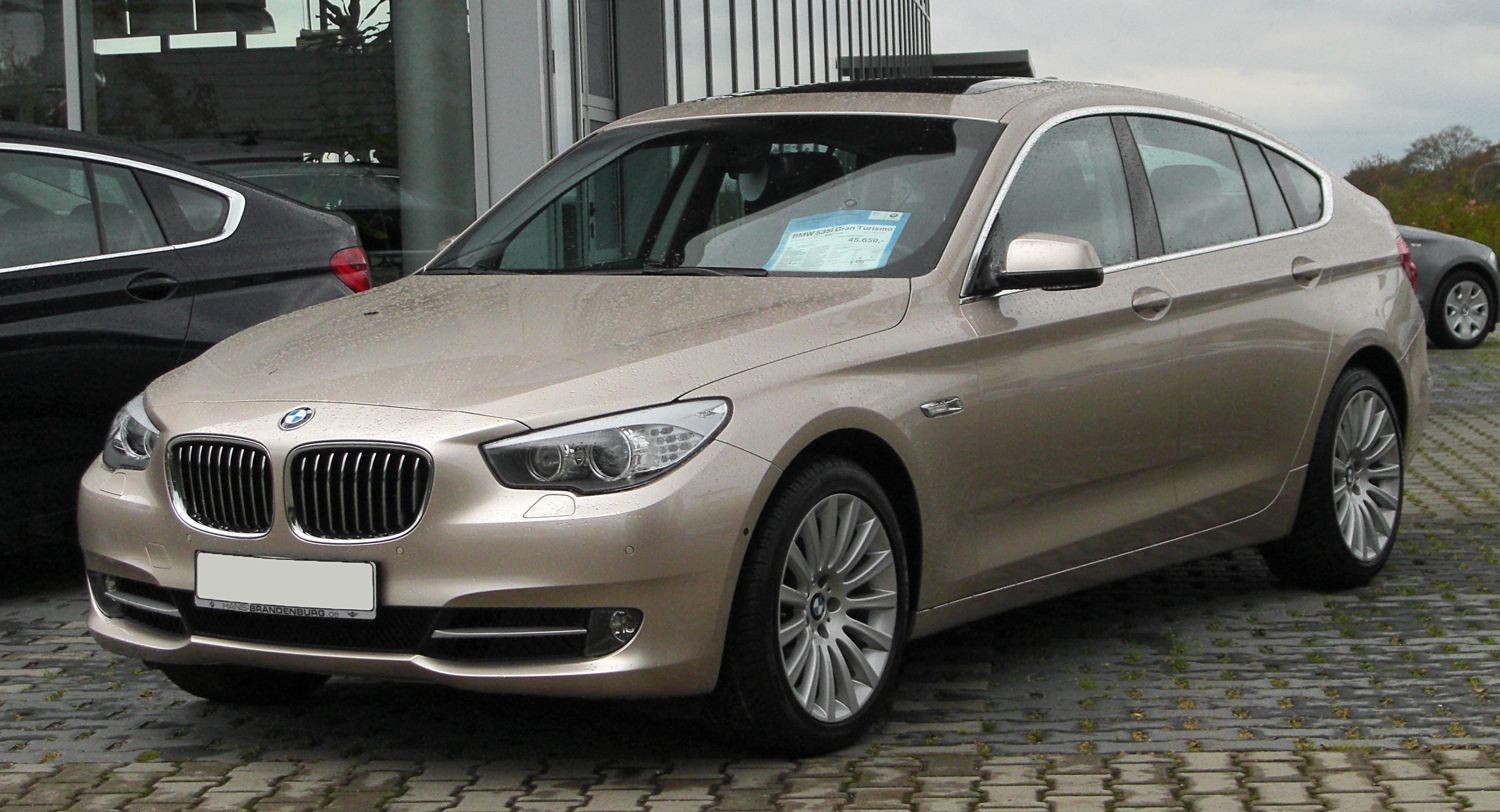
F07 Gran Turismo (front)

=== Saloon (F10) ===
The Saloon was the second body style to be launched. It was unveiled at the Munich Olympic Stadium on November 23, 2009 and production began in January 2010. The Saloon models have a length of 4,899 mm (192.9 in).

=== Touring (F11) ===
The Touring model was unveiled at the 2010 Leipzig Auto Show and production began in January 2010.

=== Gran Turismo (F07) ===
The 5 Series Gran Turismo is a 5-door fastback body style which began production in September 2009. It has a length of 4,998 mm (196.8 in) and is longer and taller than the 5 Series Saloon/Touring models and has a hatchback rear door. The tailgate has a unique two-way opening mechanism, which may be opened in a traditional car-like fashion, or the entire hatch may be open in a traditional SUV fashion for larger objects. The 5 Series GT features frameless doors, which is a first for a four-door BMW model.

Although sold as part of the 5 Series range, the Gran Turismo chassis shares the same wheelbase and track widths as the F01 7 Series. Due to its tall proportions the F07 has been described as a "7 Series hatchback". It has a wheelbase of 3,066 mm (120.7 in), a front track width of 1,610 mm (63.4 in) and a rear track width of 1,654 mm (65.1 in). When combined with the raised roofline, this results in more passenger and luggage space than the E61 5 Series wagon/estate and similar headroom to the E70 X5 and F01 7 Series. The cargo capacity is 439 L (15.5 cu ft) with the seats raised, or 1,801 L (63.6 cu ft) with the rear seats flat and the partition stowed. All F07 models use an 8-speed automatic transmission.

The 5 Series GT was introduced as the BMW Concept 5 Series Gran Turismo at the 2009 Geneva Motor Show and the production version was unveiled at the 2009 International Motor Show Germany in Frankfurt and sales began in the fourth quarter of 2009. In most countries, the 5 Series GT was sold along with previous generation E60/E61 5 Series Saloon and wagon/estate models, therefore the 5 Series GT was the first model of the F10/F11/F07 generation to be launched. The F07 535i GT was the first model to use the N55 turbocharged straight-six engine, which replaced the N54. Sales of all-wheel drive ("xDrive") models began in June 2010.

For the following G30 generation, the Gran Turismo models were moved to the 6 Series model range and renamed the G32 6 Series Gran Turismo.

=== Long wheelbase saloon (F18) ===
A long wheelbase (LWB) version of the BMW 5 Series Saloon was developed for the Chinese market, as a lower cost alternative to the 7 Series. The wheelbase of the F18 is extended by 14 cm (5.5 in) over the standard 5 Series Saloon, resulting in an overall length of 5,039 mm (198 in).

The F18 was assembled at BMW Plant Shenyang in Shenyang.

== Styling ==
The F10 uses a more traditional BMW exterior styling approach compared with the controversial styling of its E60 5 Series predecessor. The "Bangle butt" is removed, a Hofmeister kink is present, a traditional kidney grille is used and crease lines are used on the bonnet (similar to the E39 5 Series and earlier generations). Reviews of the styling have ranged from slightly bland, to handsome and muscular.

== Equipment ==
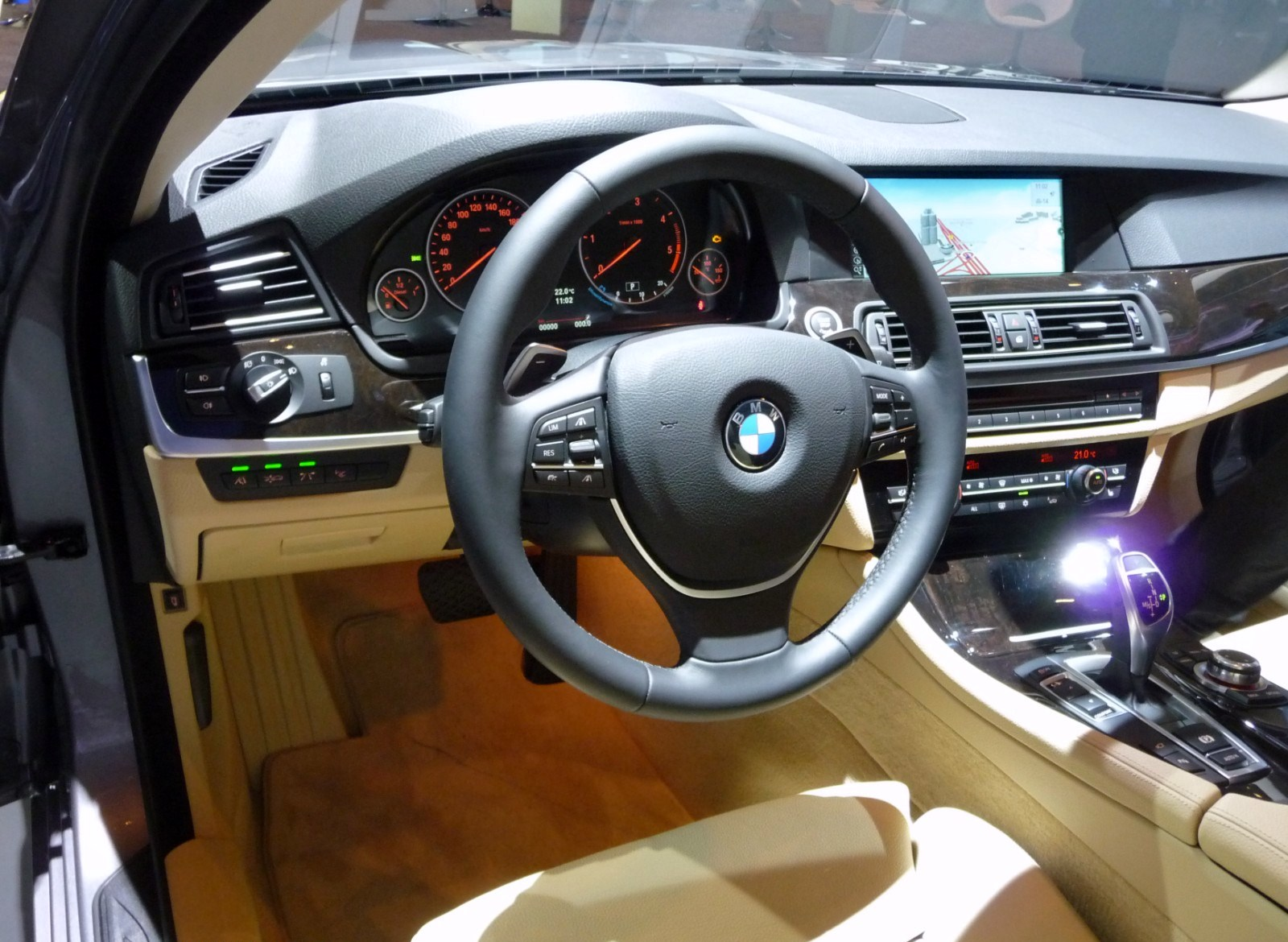
Interior

The interior features an updated iDrive system and a 13 mm (0.5 in) increase in rear knee-room for rear passengers. The F10 saw the return of the centre console being angled towards the driver, as used on the 5 Series from 1981 to 2003.

The equipment available on the F10 includes regenerative braking, a driving mode selector ("Dynamic Drive Control" with Comfort, Normal, Sport and Sport+ modes, an 80 GB hard disk for navigation data and music storage, Head-Up Display, radar cruise control which can completely stop the car and accelerate from a standstill ("Active Cruise Control with Stop and Go"), blind spot monitoring, lane departure warning system, night vision rear-wheel steering ("Integral Active Steering"), side-facing cameras in the front bumper ("Sideview"), a virtual overhead graphic of the car to assist with parking ("Topview") and speed limit display, which uses a camera to recognise street signs and display the speed limit.

The full set of M Performance parts can be fitted to all Models with the M sport trim. These include blacked out grilles, a carbon fibre splitter, spoiler for Touring models, carbon fibre mirrors, side skirts only for M Sport models and an M Performance silencer for 535i models.

== Engines ==
=== Petrol ===
The factory ratings are as follows:

Model	Years	Engine	Power	Torque	Notes
520i	2011–2016	N20B20 turbo I4	135 kW (184 PS; 181 hp) at 5,200–6,250 rpm	270 N⋅m (199 lb⋅ft) at 1,250–4,500 rpm	
523i	2010–2011	N52B25; N.A. I6	150 kW (204 PS; 201 hp) at 6,400 rpm	250 N⋅m (184 lb⋅ft) at 2,750 rpm	Asia only
523i	2010–2011	N53B30; N.A. I6	150 kW (204 PS; 201 hp) at 6,100 rpm	270 N⋅m (199 lb⋅ft) at 1,500–4,250 rpm	Europe only
528i	2010–2011	N53B30; N.A. I6	190 kW (258 PS; 255 hp) at 6,600 rpm	310 N⋅m (229 lb⋅ft) at 2,600–5,000 rpm	Europe only
528i	2010–2011	N52B30; N.A. I6	180 kW (245 PS; 241 hp) at 6,600 rpm	310 N⋅m (229 lb⋅ft) at 2,750 rpm	
528i	2012–2016	N20B20 turbo I4	180 kW (245 PS; 241 hp) at 5,000–6,500 rpm	350 N⋅m (258 lb⋅ft) at 1,250–4,800 rpm	
530i	2011–2013	N53B30; N.A. I6	200 kW (272 PS; 268 hp) at 6,100 rpm	320 N⋅m (236 lb⋅ft) at 1,600–4,250 rpm	Europe only
535i	2009–2017	N55B30 turbo I6	225 kW (306 PS; 302 hp) at 5,800 rpm	400 N⋅m (295 lb⋅ft) at 1,200–5,000 rpm	
550i	2009–2013	N63B44 turbo V8	300 kW (408 PS; 402 hp) at 5,500–6,400 rpm	600 N⋅m (443 lb⋅ft) at 1,750–4,500 rpm	
550i	2014–2017	N63B44 turbo V8	331 kW (450 PS; 444 hp) at 5,500–6,400 rpm	600 N⋅m (443 lb⋅ft) at 1,750–4,500 rpm	F07 version began in 2012
M5	2012–2016	S63B44TÜ turbo V8	412 kW (560 PS; 553 hp) at 6,000–7,000 rpm	680 N⋅m (502 lb⋅ft) at 1,500–5,700 rpm	
ActiveHybrid 5	2011–2016	N55B30 turbo I6	225 kW (306 PS; 302 hp) at 5,800 rpm	400 N⋅m (295 lb⋅ft) at 1,200–5,000 rpm	
ActiveHybrid 5	2011–2016	electric	40 kW (54 PS; 54 hp)	210 N⋅m (155 lb⋅ft)	
ActiveHybrid 5	2011–2016	combined	250 kW (340 PS; 335 hp)	450 N⋅m (332 lb⋅ft)	

In Europe, the naturally aspirated six-cylinder models used the direct-injection BMW N53 engine, however many countries outside Europe continued to use the older BMW N52 engine instead, due to high sulfur levels in the locally available petrol. In Greece and Turkey, the 520i model used the 1.6 litre version of the BMW N20 four-cylinder engine, which produced 125 kW (170 PS; 168 hp) at 5,000 rpm and 250 N⋅m (184 lb⋅ft) at 1,500–4,700 rpm.

=== Diesel ===
The factory ratings are as follows:

Model	Years	Engine	Power	Torque
518d	2013–2014	N47D20 turbo I4	105 kW (143 PS; 141 hp) at 4,000 rpm	360 N⋅m (266 lb⋅ft) at 1,750 rpm
518d	2014–2016	B47D20 turbo I4	110 kW (150 PS; 148 hp) at 4,000 rpm	361 N⋅m (266 lb⋅ft) at 1,750–2,500 rpm
520d	2010–2014	N47D20 turbo I4	135 kW (184 PS; 181 hp) at 4,000 rpm	380 N⋅m (280 lb⋅ft) at 1,750–2,750 rpm
520d	2014–2017	B47D20 turbo I4	140 kW (190 PS; 188 hp) at 4,000 rpm	400 N⋅m (295 lb⋅ft) at 1,750–2,750 rpm
525d	2010–2011	N57D30 turbo I6	150 kW (204 PS; 201 hp) at 4,000 rpm	450 N⋅m (332 lb⋅ft) at 1,750–2,500 rpm
525d	2011–2016	N47D20 twin-turbo I4	160 kW (218 PS; 215 hp) at 4,400 rpm	450 N⋅m (332 lb⋅ft) at 1,500–2,500 rpm
530d	2009–2011	N57D30O0 single-turbo I6	180 kW (245 PS; 241 hp) at 4,000 rpm	540 N⋅m (398 lb⋅ft) at 1,750–3,000 rpm
530d	2011–2017	N57D30O1 single-turbo I6	190 kW (258 PS; 255 hp) at 4,000 rpm	560 N⋅m (413 lb⋅ft) at 1,500–3,000 rpm
535d	2010–2011	N57D30T0 twin-turbo I6	220 kW (299 PS; 295 hp) at 4,400 rpm	600 N⋅m (443 lb⋅ft) at 1,500–2,500 rpm
535d	2011–2017	N57D30T1 twin-turbo I6	230 kW (313 PS; 308 hp) at 4,400 rpm	630 N⋅m (465 lb⋅ft) at 1,500–2,500 rpm
M550d	2012–2016	N57S tri-turbo I6	280 kW (381 PS; 375 hp) at 4,000–4,400 rpm	740 N⋅m (546 lb⋅ft) at 2,000–3,000 rpm

For the 530d model, an M Performance Kit was offered in some markets, which increased power to 210 kW (286 PS; 282 hp) and torque to 600 N⋅m (443 lb⋅ft).

North American 535d models used the 190 kW (258 PS; 255 hp) engine from the European-specification 530d models.

== Drivetrain ==
Transmission options for the model range (excluding the M5) were a 6-speed manual or an 8-speed ZF 8HP automatic. The M5 uses a 7-speed dual clutch transmission (with a 6-speed manual also being available in the United States and Canada).

== Chassis and suspension ==
The F10 uses the same platform as the F01 7 Series. Front suspension is double wishbone with double-pivot lower arms (previous 5 Series generations used Macpherson struts). Rear suspension is a multi-link design with 5 links called "Integral V".

Most suspension components are made from aluminium. The chassis is constructed from various grades of steel and the body is 55% stiffer than its E60 predecessor. Compared with the aluminium front structure used by the E60, the F10's steel components are heavier but cheaper to produce and repair. To reduce weight, the bonnet, front fenders and doors are made from aluminium.

The rear-wheel drive version of the 2011 535i has a rollover risk of 9.3% and a 5 of 5 stars overall safety rating.

== M5 model ==
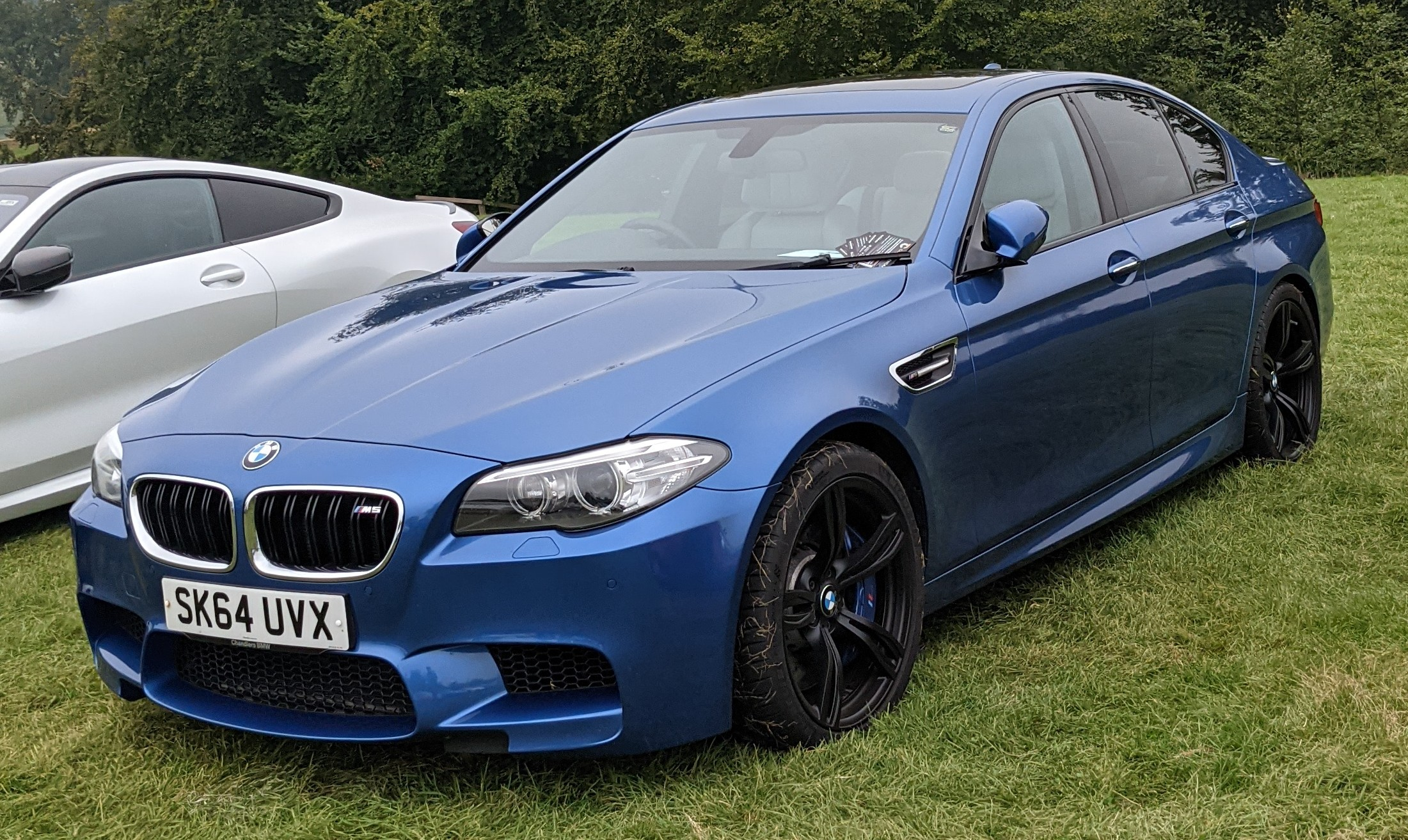
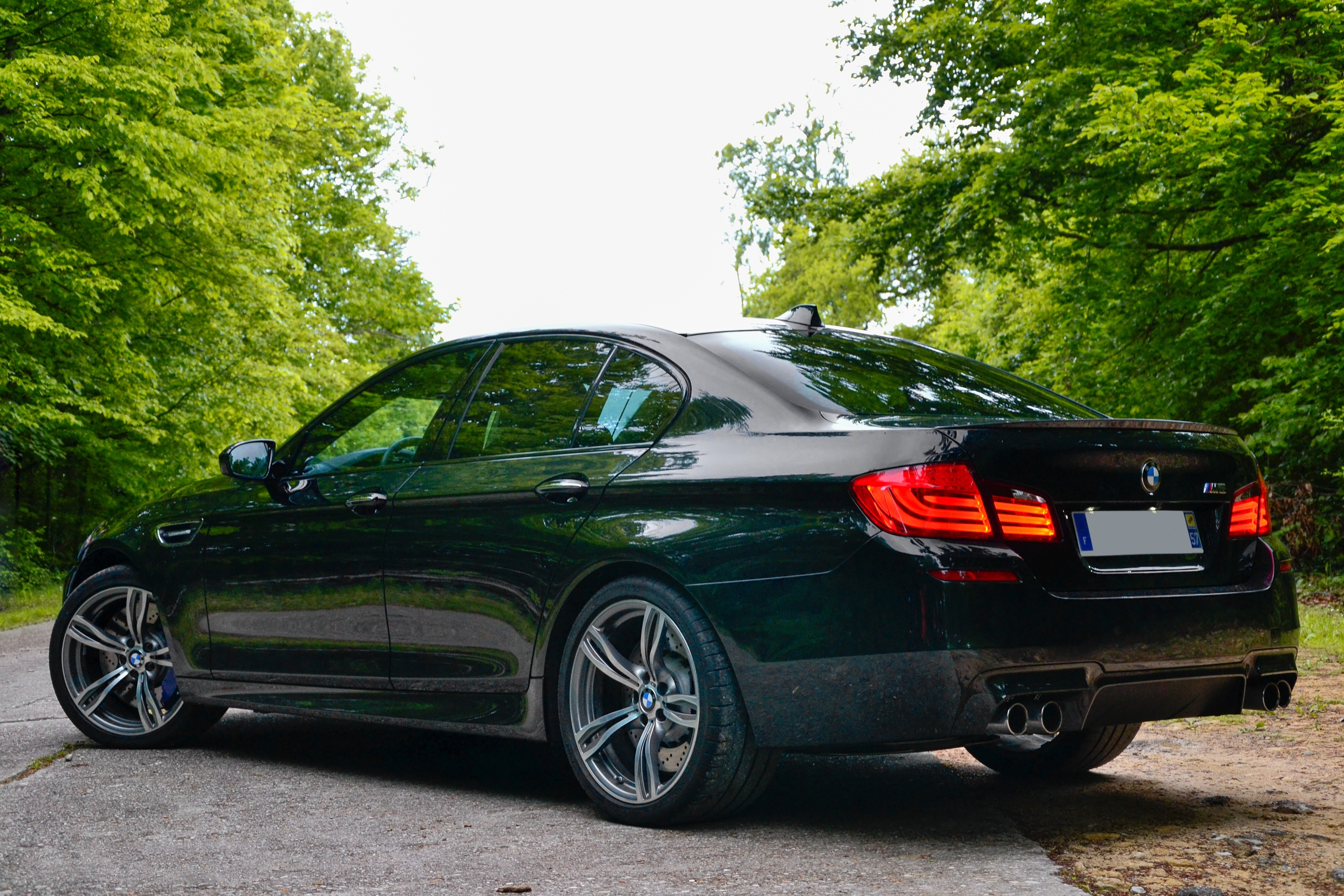
BMW M5

The M5 model of the F10 generation was initially powered by a version of the BMW S63 twin-turbocharged V8 engine rated at 412 kW (560 PS; 553 hp) at 6,000 – 7,000 rpm and a maximum torque of 680 N⋅m (502 lb⋅ft) from 1,500 – 5,750 rpm. The official 0–100 km/h (62 mph) time is 4.4 seconds. The top speed is electronically limited to 250 km/h (155 mph), which could be increased to 305 km/h (190 mph) if the M Driver's Package was purchased.

A seven-speed dual-clutch transmission ("M-DCT") is used, along with a limited slip differential that can provide torque vectoring between the rear wheels. In North America, the M5 was available with a 6-speed manual transmission, the only market to be offered this option.

In 2014, BMW introduced a "Competition Package" version, with power output raised to 441 kW (600 PS; 591 hp) and 700 N⋅m (516 lb⋅ft) of torque.

== Alpina models ==
Alpina produced two variants of the F10/F11 5 Series, the petrol-engined B5 and diesel-engined D5.

B5 Bi-Turbo

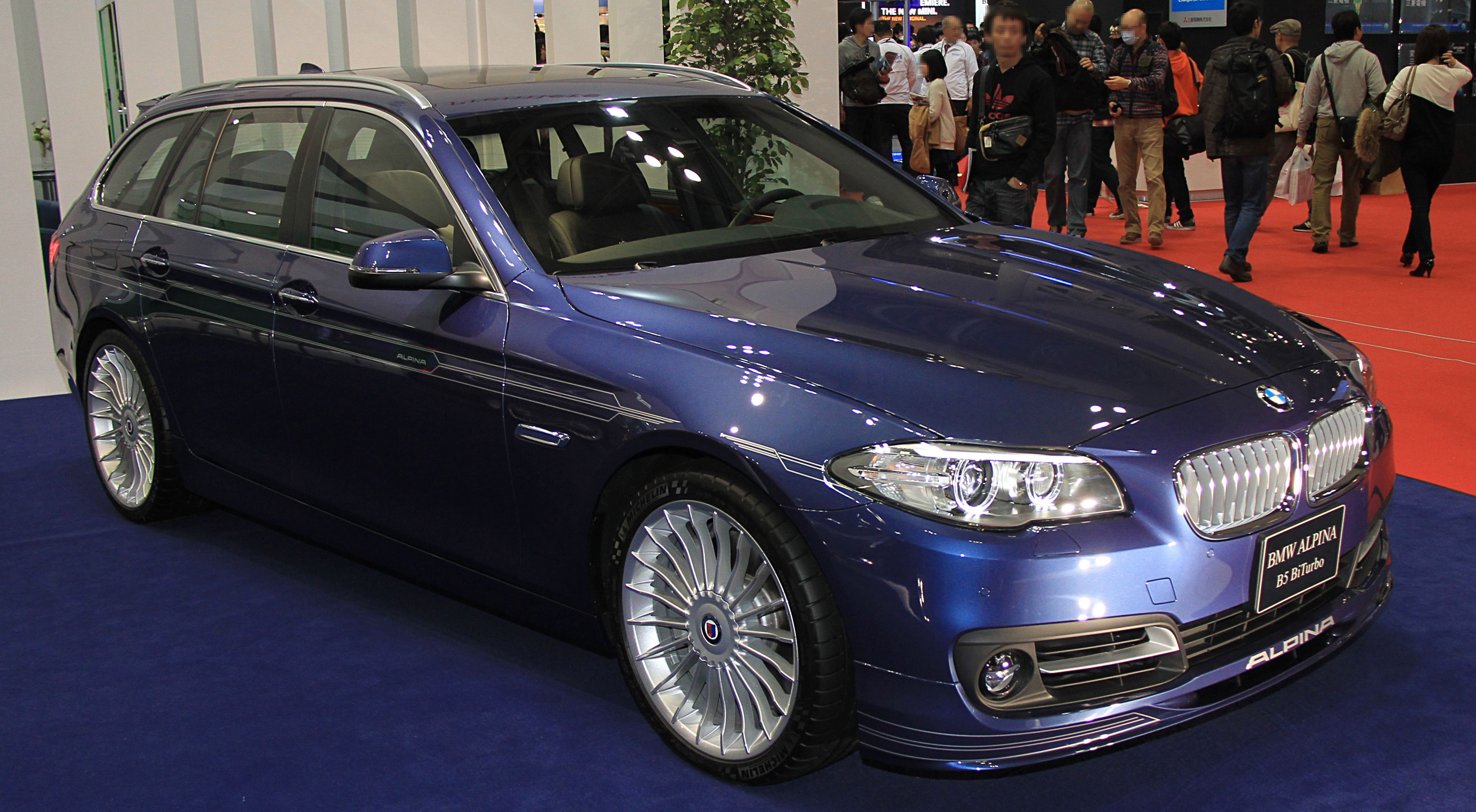
Alpina B5 Bi-Turbo Touring

The B5 is based on the 550i and is powered by an Alpina-modified version of the BMW N63 twin-turbo V8 engine. The original B5, which was unveiled at the 2010 Goodwood Festival of Speed, produced 373 kW (500 bhp) and 700 N⋅m (520 lb⋅ft). The transmission is an 8-speed automatic.

Alpina unveiled an updated B5 at the 2012 Geneva Motor Show. Power had been uprated to 397 kW (532 bhp) and torque to 730 N⋅m (540 lb⋅ft). During 2015, Alpina sold the B5 Bi-Turbo Edition 50, which marked the company's 50th year in operation. The Edition 50 uses an upgraded engine which produces 441 kW (591 bhp) and 800 N⋅m (590 lb⋅ft). The standard B5 received this same engine for the B5's last year of production, 2016.

D5 Bi-Turbo

The D5 Bi-Turbo is based on the 535d. It is powered by Alpina-modified version of the BMW N57 turbo straight-6 engine, which produces 257 kW (345 bhp) and 700 N⋅m (520 lb⋅ft).

== Special models ==
=== 530Le (China only) ===
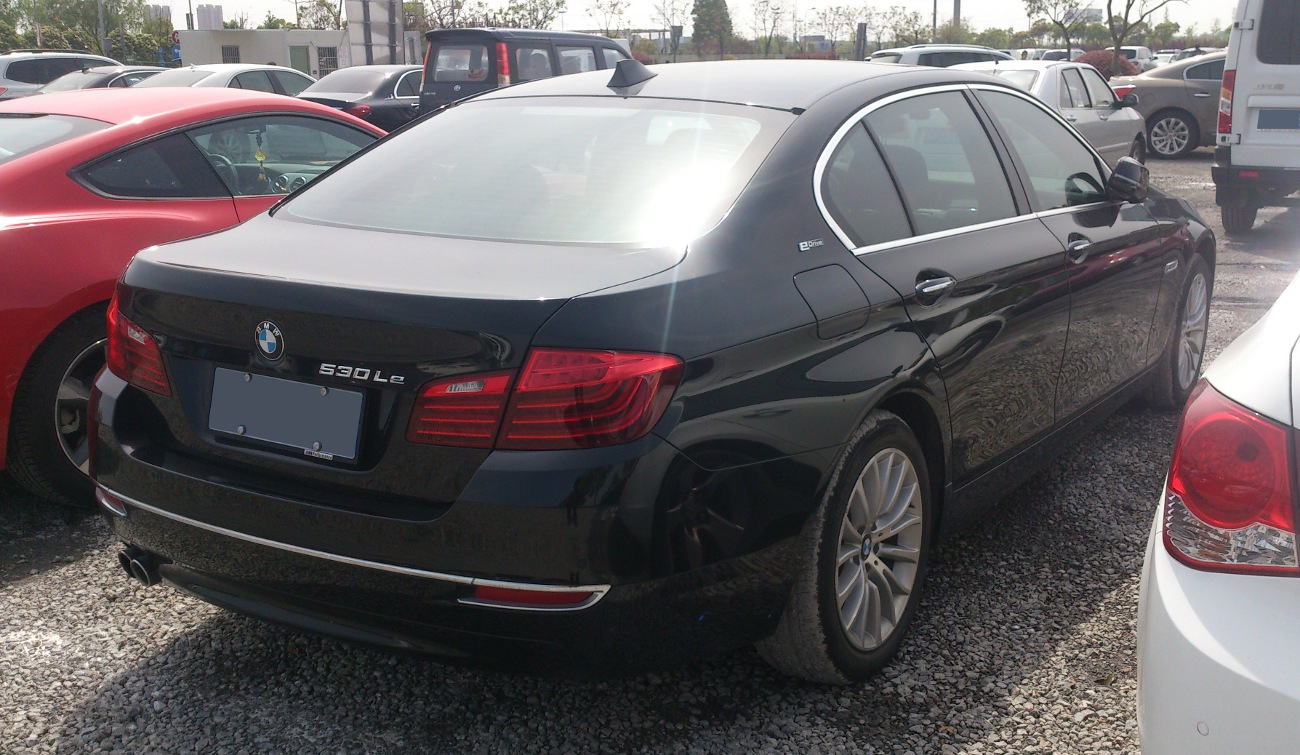
F18 530Le

The 530Le is a plug-in hybrid version F18 long-wheelbase saloon, which was produced solely for the Chinese market.

It was unveiled at the 2014 Guangzhou Shaniry Auto Show. It was powered by BMW's 160 kW (210 bhp) N20 working in conjunction with an electric motor with a maximum output of 70 kW (94 hp). In pure-electric mode the 530Le can reach a maximum speed of 120 km/h (75 mph) and has a maximum range of 58 km (36 mi). Combined fuel consumption is 2.1 L/100 km (130 mpg_{‑imp}; 110 mpg_{‑US}).

=== ActiveHybrid 5 ===
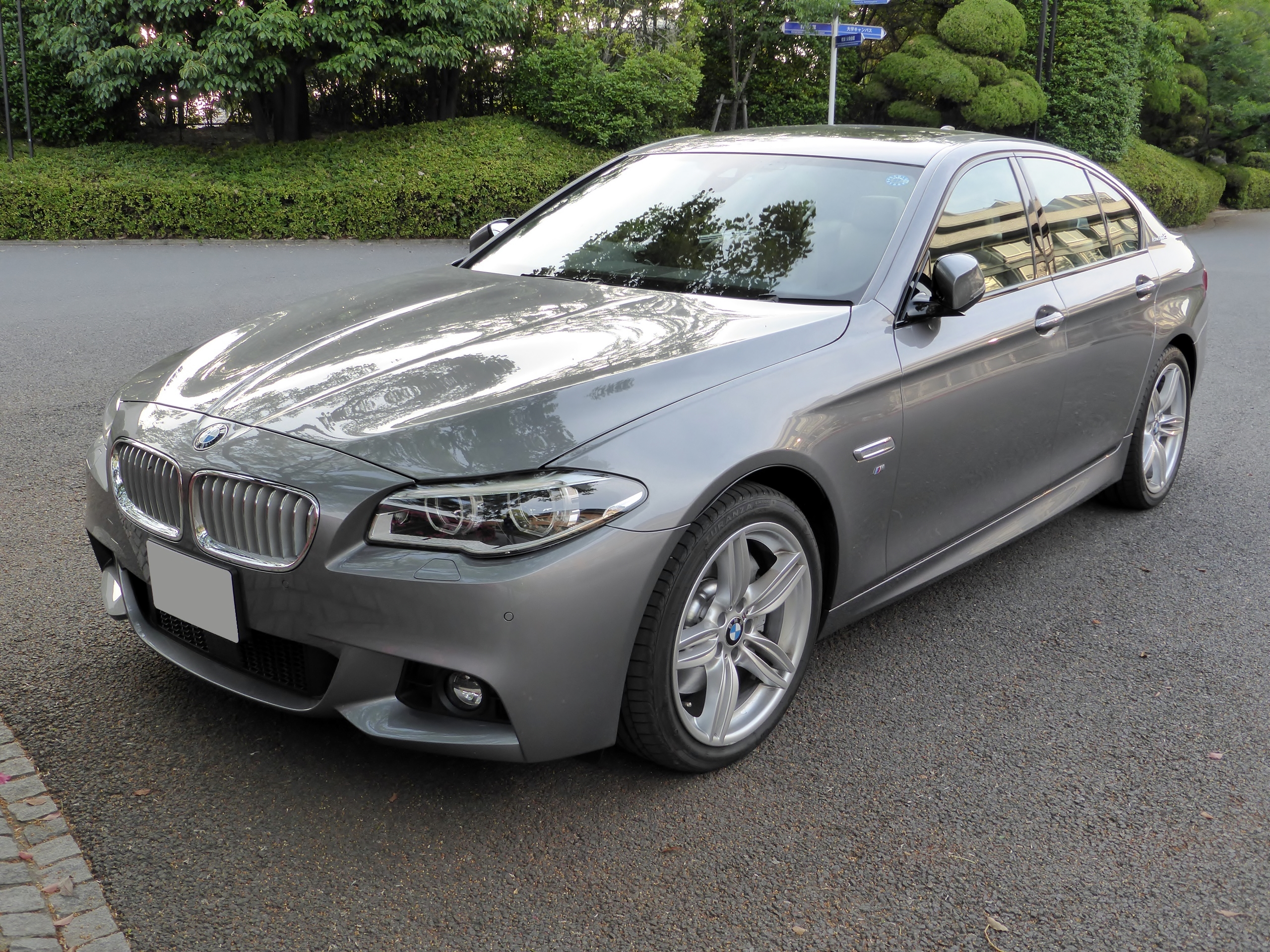
ActiveHybrid 5

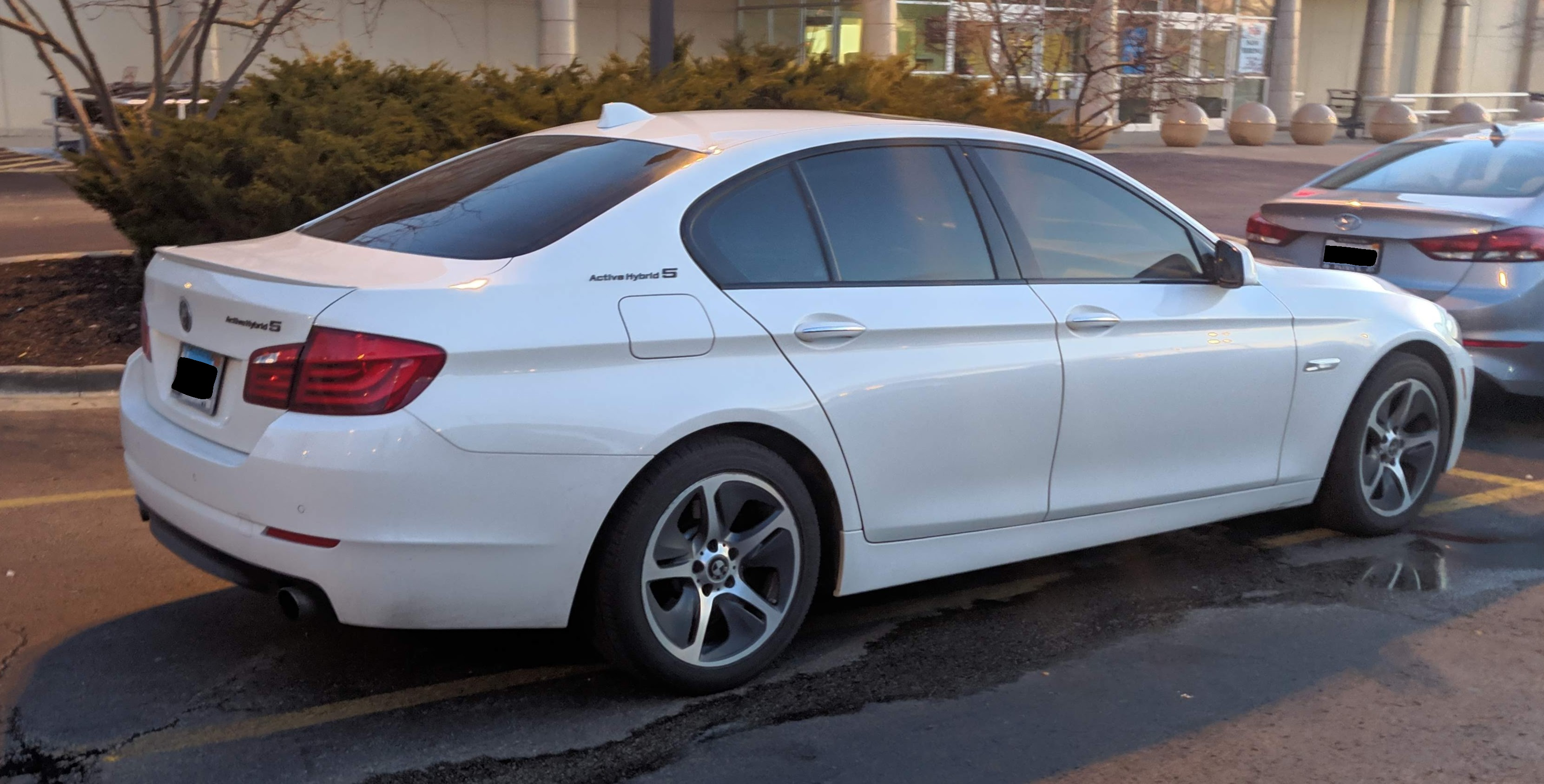
2013 ActiveHybrid 5 rear

The ActiveHybrid is a hybrid version of the 5 Series based on the 535i Saloon. It was previewed by the Concept 5 Series ActiveHybrid at the 2010 Geneva Motor Show and produced from 2011 to 2016.

The production ActiveHybrid 5 features a synchronous electric motor integrated into the housing of the automatic gearbox. This is combined with the turbocharged 3.0 litre straight-six engine from the 535i. The electric motor produces 40 kW (54 bhp) and 210 N⋅m (150 lb⋅ft) of torque. The lithium-ion battery has its own cooling system and has a capacity of 1.35 kWh. Due to the presence of the battery, luggage space is reduced from 520 litres to 375 litres.

Electric-only mode can be used at speeds of up to 60 km/h (37 mph). The ActiveHybrid 5 includes a start-stop system and a coasting mode. BMW claims the ActiveHybrid 5 is capable of an electric-only range of 4 km (2.5 mi).

The U.S. Environmental Protection Agency (EPA) rated the 2013 model year ActiveHybrid 5 with a combined fuel economy of 26 mpg_{‑US} (9.0 L/100 km; 31 mpg_{‑imp}), with 23 mpg_{‑US} (10 L/100 km; 28 mpg_{‑imp}) in the city, and 30 mpg_{‑US} (7.8 L/100 km; 36 mpg_{‑imp}) in highway. The fuel-saving technologies reduces fuel consumption and emissions by more than 10%.

=== M550d xDrive ===
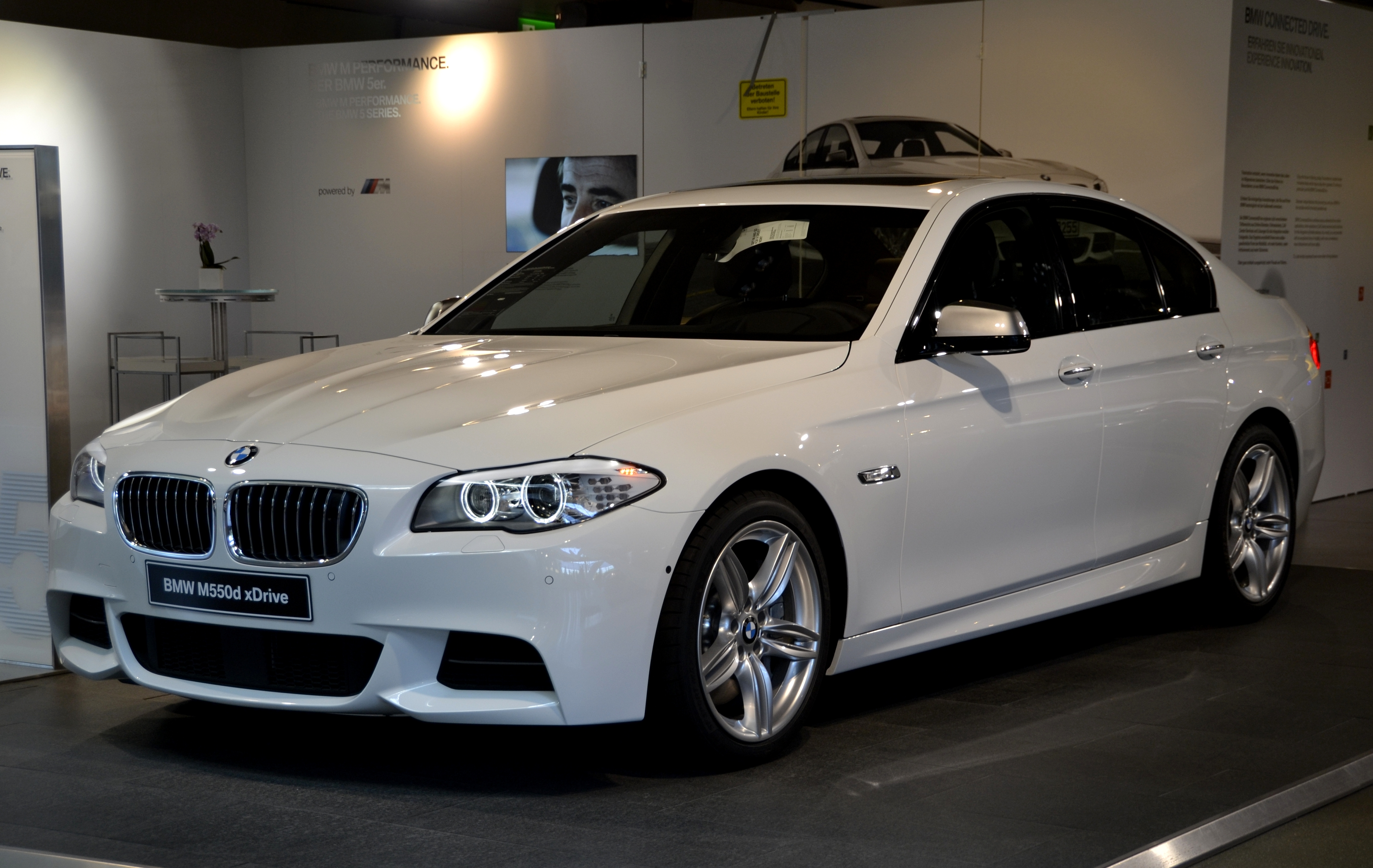
M550d xDrive

The M550d xDrive is the highest diesel-engined model, and was produced in Saloon and Touring body styles. It was a launch model for the "M Performance" sub-brand – alongside the X5 M50d and X6 M50d – at the 2012 Geneva International Motor Show and was produced until 2016. The M550d is powered by the N57S triple-turbo straight-6 diesel engine. The N57S produces 280 kW (381 PS; 375 hp) and 740 N⋅m (546 lb⋅ft), resulting in a claimed 0–100 km/h (62 mph) acceleration of 4.7 seconds (4.9 for the Touring). The transmission is a ZF 8HP 8-speed automatic and all models are all-wheel drive ("xDrive").

== Model year changes ==
=== 2012 ===
- 520i model introduced, the first 5 Series to be powered by a four-cylinder turbocharged petrol engine.
- ActiveHybrid 5 introduced, the first hybrid-powered 5 Series.
- "BMW ConnectedDrive" introduced, including an upgraded Head-Up Display, Real-Time Traffic Information and hands-free opening of the tailgate or rear window.

=== 2014 facelift ===
The F10 facelift (also known as LCI) models began production in July 2013. Changes include:

- 518d model introduced
- 550i engine upgraded to N63B44O2, increasing power to 331 kW (444 bhp)
- Bi-Xenon headlights with washers fitted as standard, revised tail-lights, optional LED and or adaptive headlights and fog lights as options
- Improved Stop/Start system
- Improved auto transmission features (coasting in idle, connected shift)
- Improved and additional driver assistance systems
- Improved electronic handbrake
- Tablets available for rear seat passengers
- Minor exterior styling changes.
- Turn signal repeater integrated into wing mirrors
- Upgraded iDrive with touchpad added to the top of the iDrive controller
- Gran Turismo models use a revised tailgate and have an increase in luggage capacity by 60 L (2.1 cu ft)
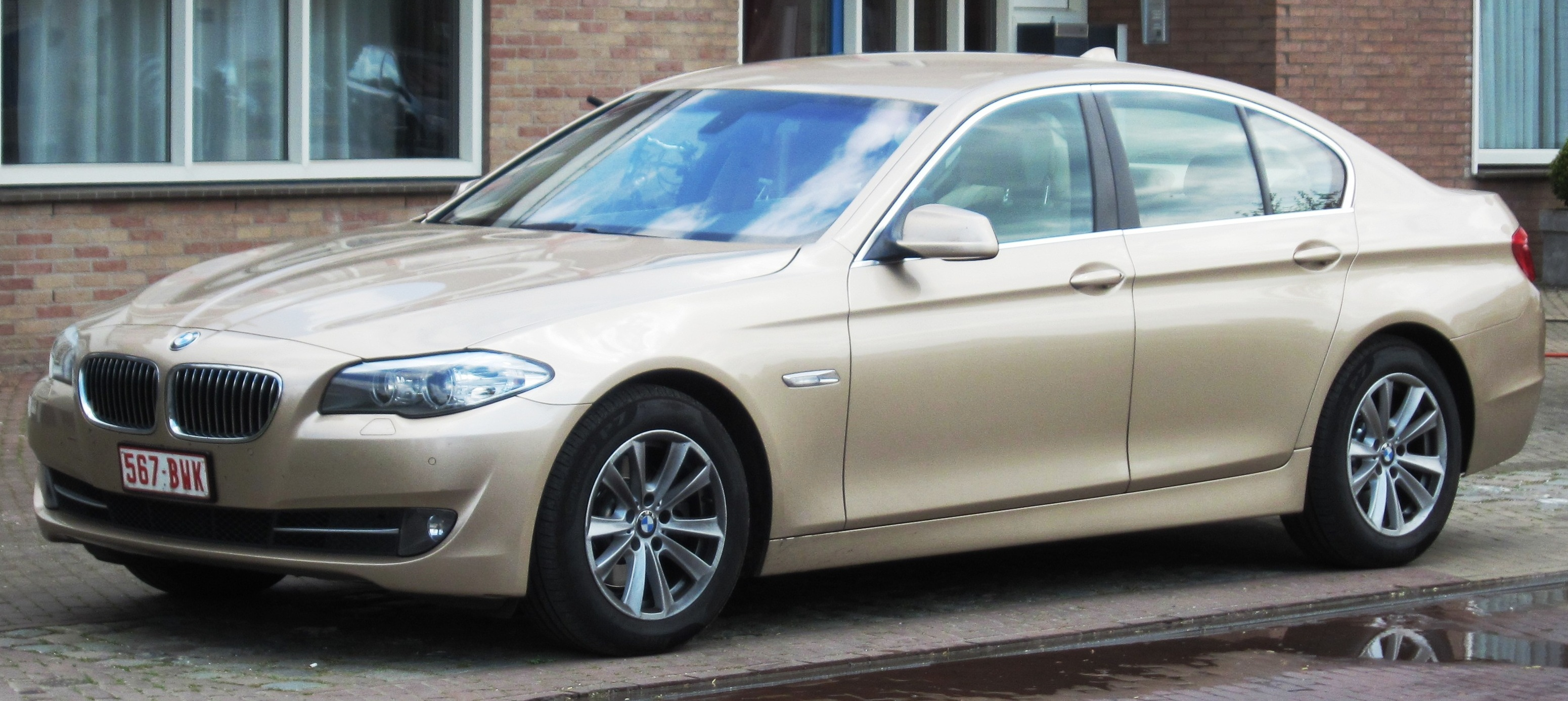
Pre-facelift: front

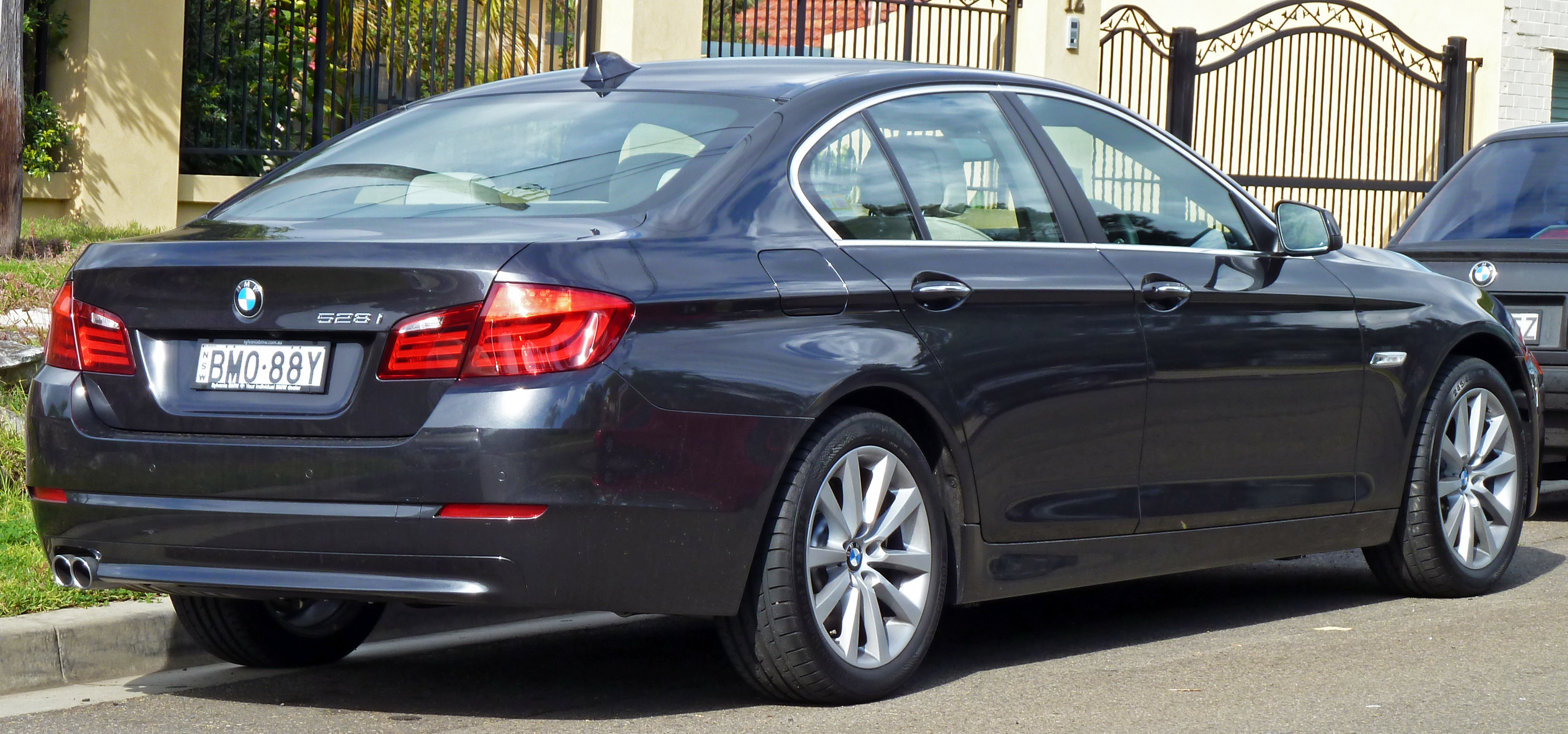
Pre-facelift: rear

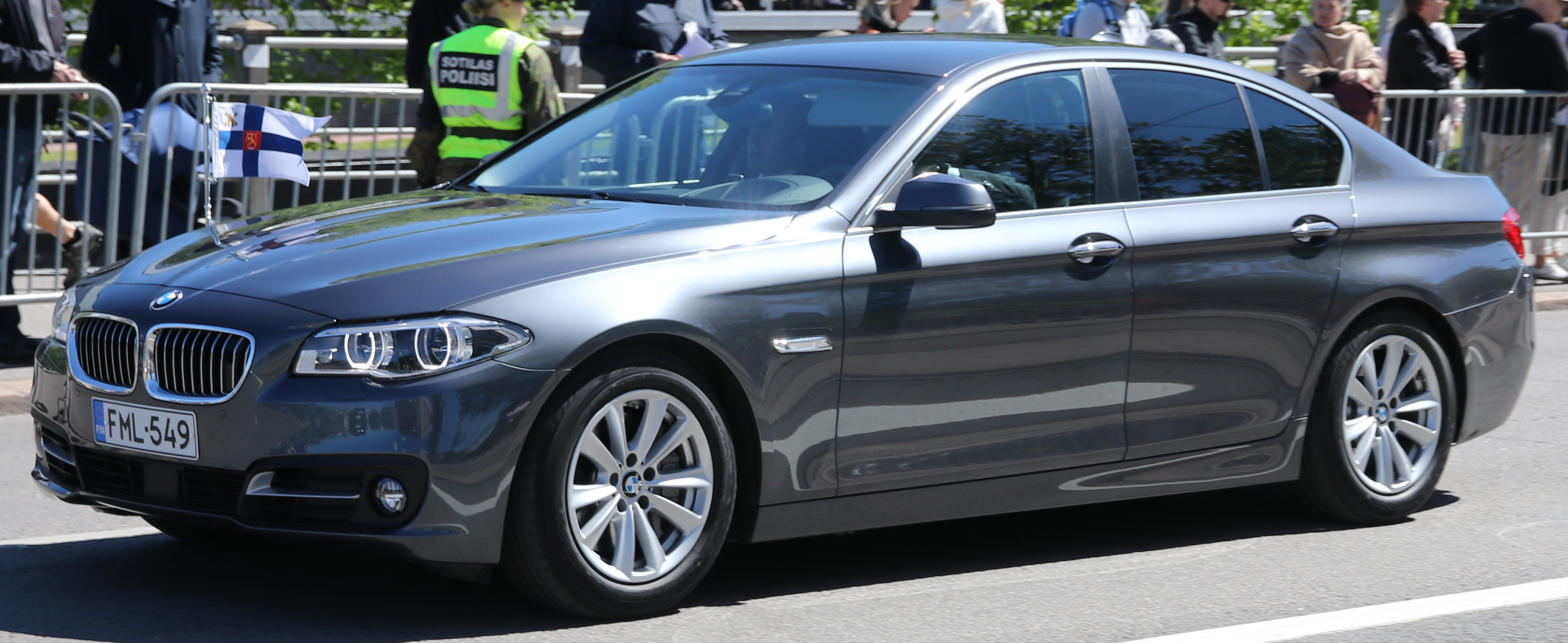
Post-facelift: front

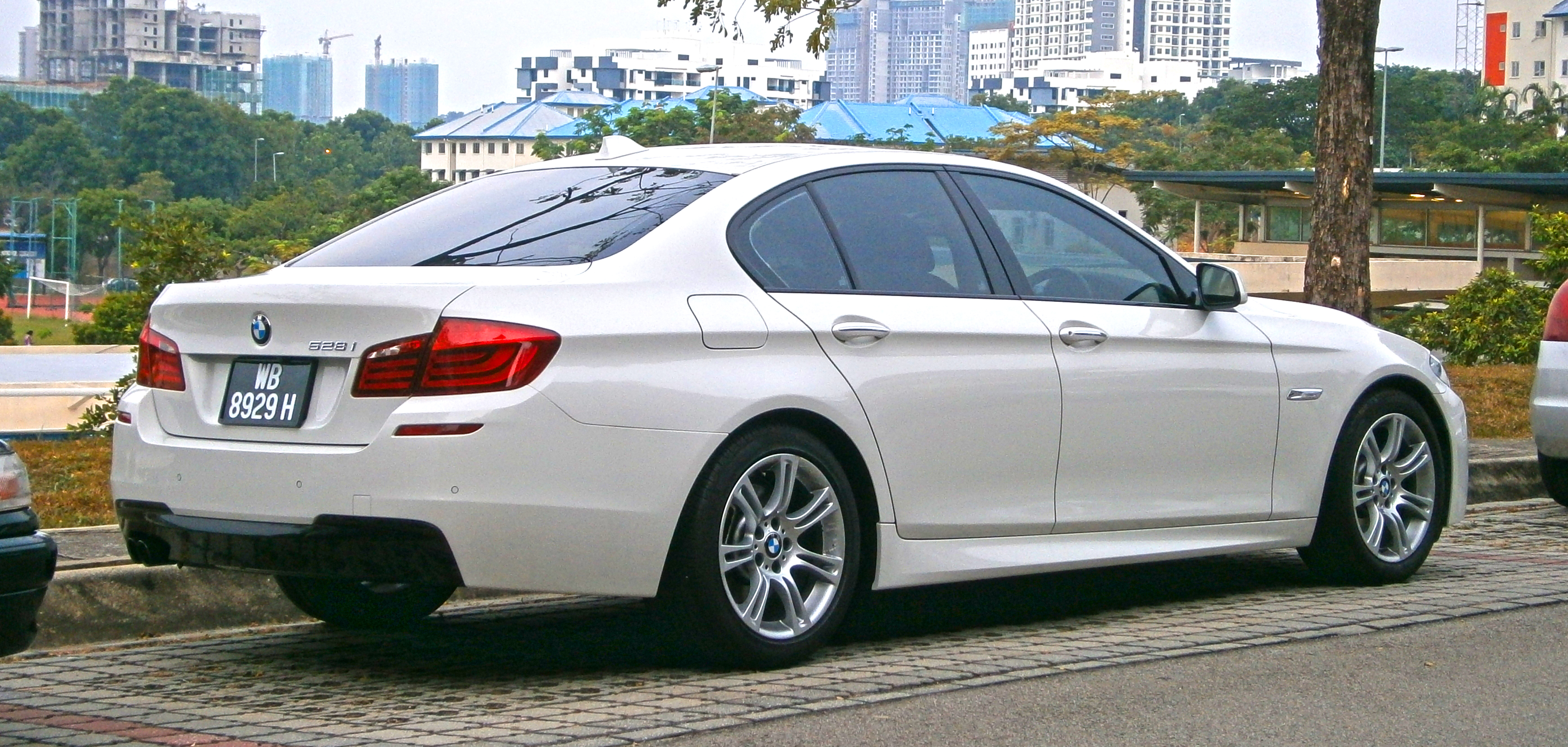
Post-facelift: rear

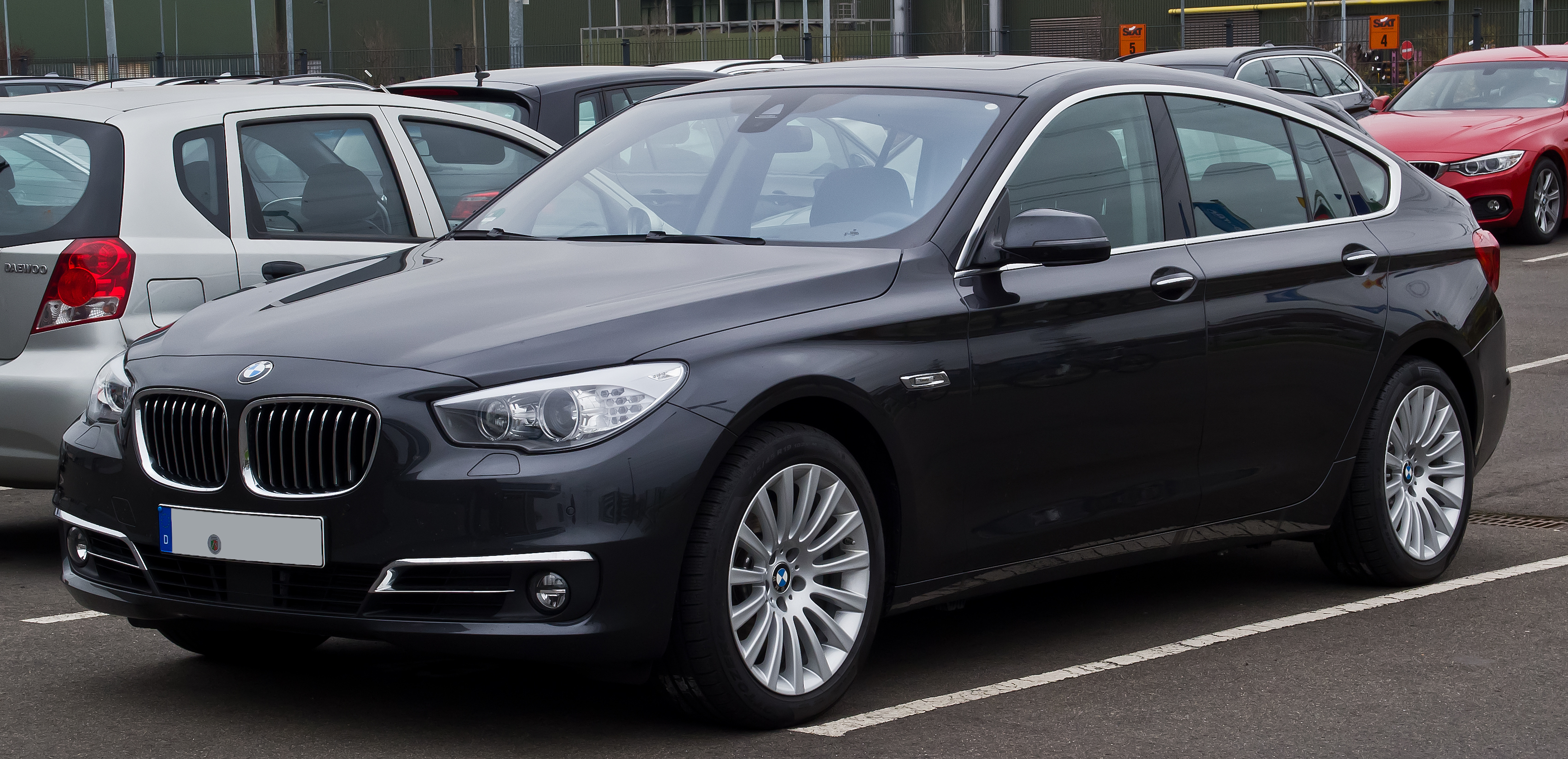
Facelifted Front (GT)

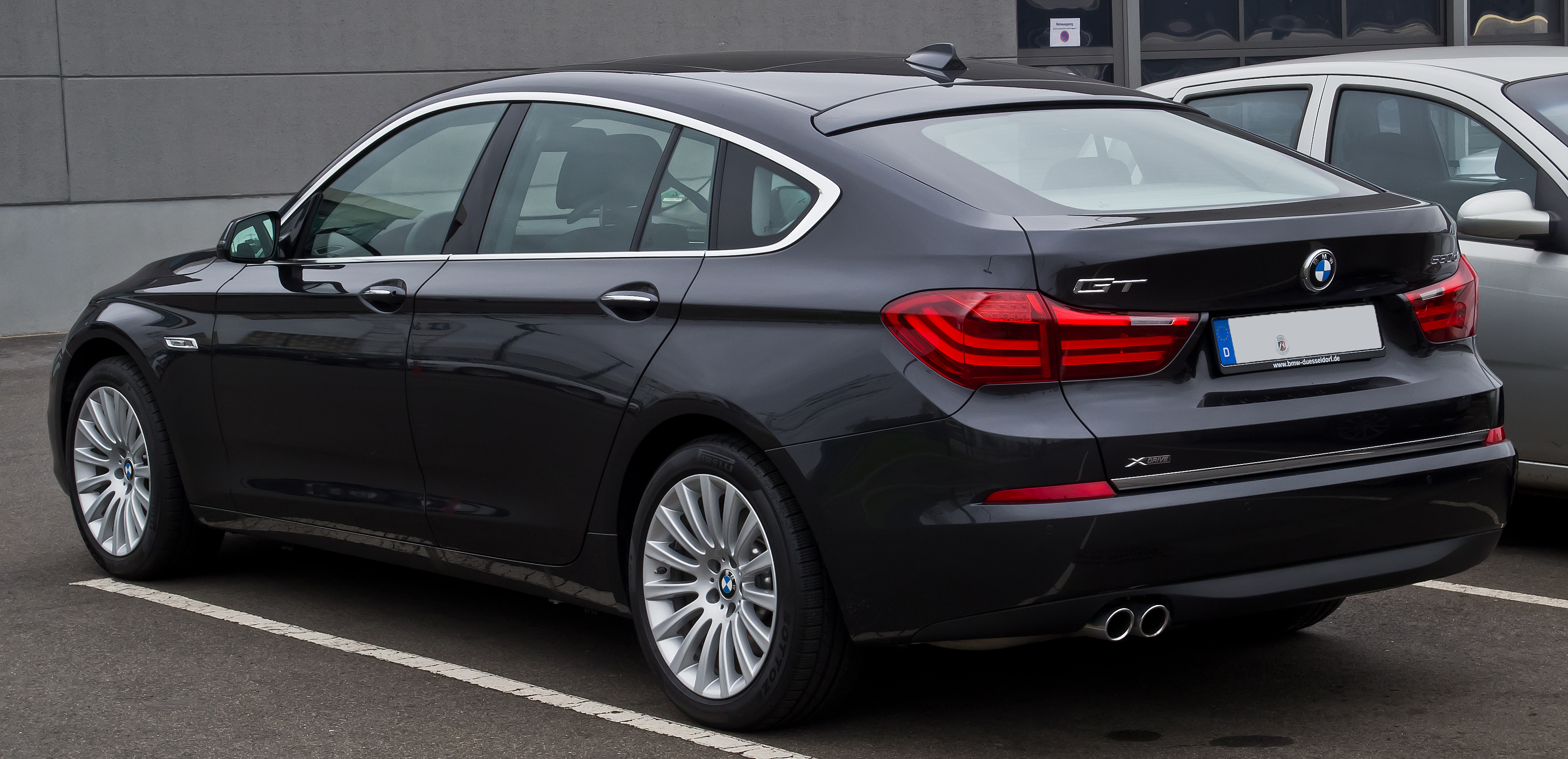
Facelift rear (GT)

== Production ==
Production of the F10 occurred at the BMW Group Plant Dingolfing in Germany and at the BMW Brilliance plant in China. Series production began on 7 January 2010 and the last F10 generation car was produced in February 2017.

Complete knock-down assembly of German-produced kits took place in Thailand, Malaysia, Egypt, India, Indonesia and Russia.

== Safety ==
ANCAP test results* BMW 5 Series 4 & 6 cylinder engine variants (2010)
Test	Score
Overall	5 /5 stars
Frontal offset	15.53/16
Side impact	16/16
Pole	2/2
Seat belt reminders	3/3
Whiplash protection	Pending
Pedestrian protection	Good
Electronic stability control	Standard

The 2010 530d received five stars overall in its Euro NCAP test.

Euro NCAP test results* BMW 530d, LHD (2010)
Test	Points	%
Overall:	5 /5 stars	
Adult occupant:	34.3	95%
Child occupant:	40.8	83%
Pedestrian:	28	78%
Safety assist:	7	100%

== Marketing ==
In 2011, BMW North America released an advertisement called "Refuel" to promote the F10's fuel economy and re-introduce BMW's traditional "Ultimate Driving Machine" motto. The ad features an F10 Saloon and a jet plane.

BMW Canada's advertisement for the launch of the F10 M5 in 2012 is a 2-minute video called "Bullet". The advertisement shows the M5 launching from a tube and destroying several targets in its path. In December 2011, the F10 M5 featured in a commercial where an illustrator attempted to draw a Christmas card in the M5 while it was being driven around the Circuit de l'Anneau Du Rhin. A movie featuring an M5 prototype driving in snow was also produced.

The F10 M5 was also used as a Nürburgring Ring Taxi. It was unveiled at the 2011 Goodwood Festival of Speed and replaced the E90 M3 as Ring Taxi in April 2012.
