= Traffic-sign recognition =

Driver assistance system to recognize traffic signs

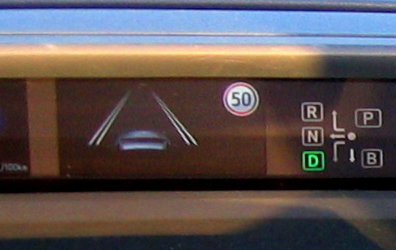
Traffic-sign (speed limit) recognition

Traffic-sign recognition (TSR) is a technology by which a vehicle is able to recognize the traffic signs put on the road e.g. "speed limit" or "children" or "turn ahead". This is part of the features collectively called ADAS. The technology is being developed by a variety of automotive suppliers to improve the safety of vehicles. It uses image processing techniques to detect the traffic signs. The detection methods can be generally divided into color based, shape based and learning based methods.

== History ==
The Vienna Convention on Road Signs and Signals is a treaty signed in 1968 which has been able to standardize traffic signs across different countries. About 52 countries have signed this treaty, which includes 31 countries from Europe. The convention has broadly classified the road signs into seven categories designated with letters A to H. This standardization has been the main drive for helping the development of traffic-sign recognition systems that can be used globally.

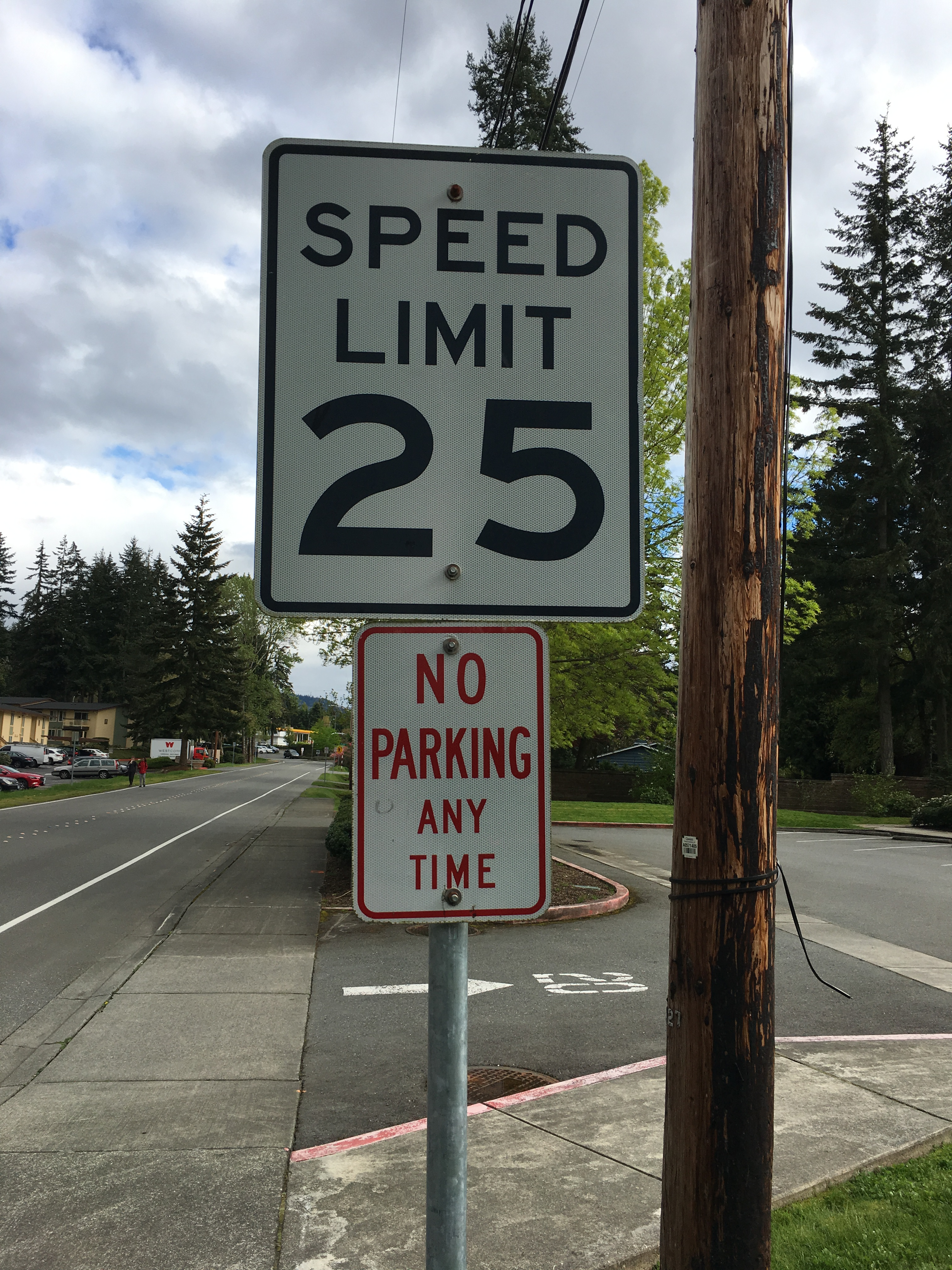
A speed limit sign in the United States

Traffic-sign recognition first appeared, in the form of speed limit sign recognition, in 2008 for the 2009 Vauxhall Insignia. Later in 2009 they appeared on the new BMW 7 Series, and the following year on the Mercedes-Benz S-Class. At that time, these systems only detected the round speed limit signs found all across Europe (e.g.).

Second-generation systems can also detect overtaking restrictions. It was introduced in 2008 in the Opel Insignia, later followed by the Opel Astra and the Saab 9-5. This technology is also available on the 2011 Volkswagen Phaeton and, since 2012, in the Volvo S80, V70, XC70, XC60, S60, V60 and V40, as a technology called Road Sign Information. They are not able to recognize city limit signs, which in most European countries are associated with speed limits, as they are too similar to direction signs.

Such systems are expected to be mandatory on new cars sold in the EU from May 2022 which should apply regulation 2021/1958 from 23 June 2021.

== Implementation ==
Traffic signs can be analyzed using forward-facing cameras in many modern cars, vehicles and trucks. One of the basic use cases of a traffic-sign recognition system is for speed limits. Most of the GPS data would procure speed information, but additional speed limit traffic signs can also be used to extract information and display it in the dashboard of the car to alert the driver about the road sign. This is an advanced driver-assistance feature available in most high-end cars, mainly in European vehicles.

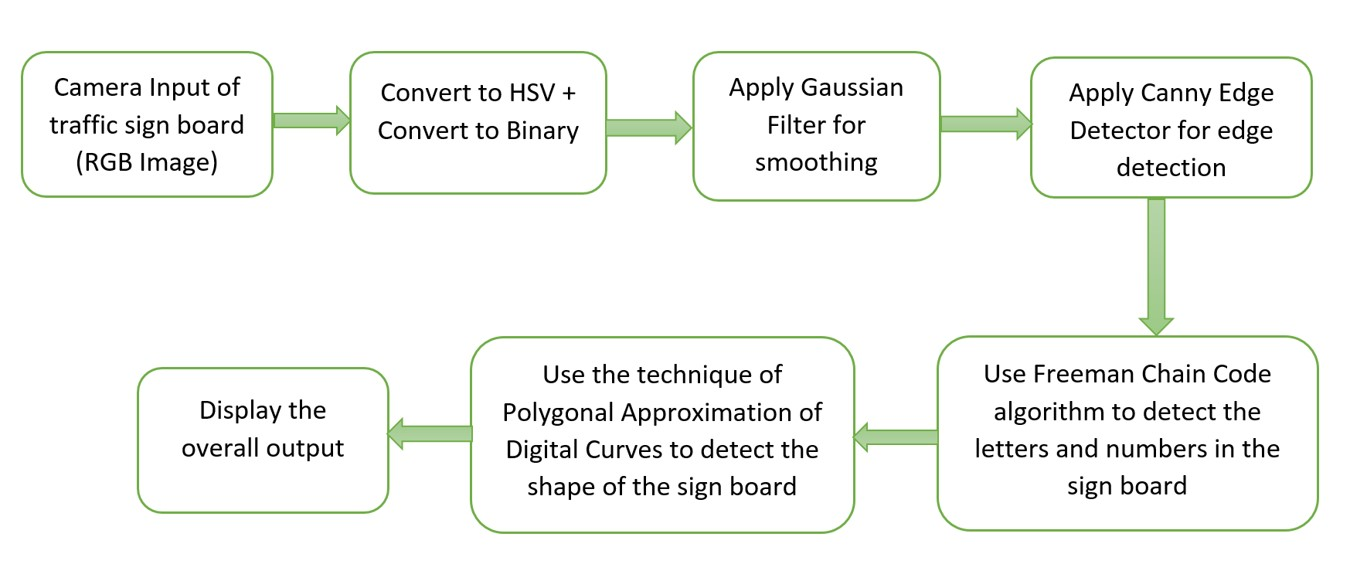
An example algorithm for traffic-sign detection

Modern traffic-sign recognition systems are being developed using convolutional neural networks, mainly driven by the requirements of autonomous vehicles and self-driving cars. In these scenarios, the detection system needs to identify a variety of traffic signs and not just speed limits. This is where the Vienna Convention on Road Signs and Signals comes to help. A convolutional neural network can be trained to take in these predefined traffic signs and 'learn' using Deep Learning techniques.

The neural net in turn uses Image Processing and Computer Vision to train the network with its potential outcomes. The trained neural net can then be used in real time to detect new traffic signs in real time. Self driving car companies including Waymo and Uber are generating and outsourcing traffic-sign data sets along with map and navigation companies like Tom Tom. Advanced computer vision and neural network techniques make this goal highly efficient and achievable in real time.

An example implementation of the image preprocessing steps in a traffic-sign detection algorithm

There are diverse algorithms for traffic-sign recognition. Common ones are those based on the shape of the sign board. Typical sign board shapes like hexagons, circles, and rectangles define different types of signs, which can be used for classification. Other major algorithms for character recognition includes Haar-like features, Freeman Chain code, AdaBoost detection and deep learning neural networks methods. Haar-like features can be used to create cascaded classifiers which can then help detect the sign board characters.

Deep learning can be incorporated into traffic-sign detection. Polygonal approximation of digital curves using Ramer–Douglas–Peucker algorithm can be used to detect the shape of the sign boards and methods like Support Vector Machines and Byte-MCT with an AdaBoost classifier has been used in one of the methods to detect traffic signs.

Identification of speed limit signs also needs to take into account the units used in a particular area. For instance, a vehicle travelling from Northern Ireland to Ireland would need to be able to differentiate the km/h speed limit signage in Ireland from the mph speed limit signage still used in Northern Ireland, which is particularly important when traffic sign recognition is linked to Intelligent speed assistance systems. Geofencing and reference to online navigation databases can be used as a hint to the algorithm to identify which units are likely to be in use.

== Usage ==
Information gathered from road signs by a forward facing camera is used in Tesla's Autosteer and Traffic-aware Cruise Control Systems to bring the vehicle to a stop if a stop sign is detected. After a recent software update many Tesla vehicles upload the speed limit data collected by their cameras to Tesla's navigation software for all other vehicles to use.

== Car makers and vehicles ==
Some cars with such system are made by Audi, BMW, Citroën, Ford, Honda, Infiniti, Jaguar, Jeep, Land Rover, Lexus, Mazda, Mercedes, Nissan, Opel, Peugeot, Porsche, Renault, Toyota, Volkswagen, Tesla and Volvo.

For instance:

- Audi: Audi A8
- BMW: BMW 7 Series, BMW 5 Series Gran Turismo, BMW 5 Series
- Mercedes: Mercedes-Benz E Class, Mercedes-Benz S Class
- Opel: Opel Insignia, Opel Corsa
- Saab 9-5
- Volkswagen Phaeton
- Lexus: Lexus GS, Lexus LS, Lexus RX 2022+
- Tesla: Model X, Model S, Model Y, Model 3

== See also ==
- Intelligent speed adaptation
- Intelligent car
- Self Driving Vehicles
- Tesla Autopilot
