= 1891 West Derbyshire by-election =

UK parliamentary by-election

The 1891 West Derbyshire by-election was a parliamentary by-election held for the British House of Commons constituency of West Derbyshire on 2 June 1891.

== Vacancy ==
The vacancy was caused by the death, on 18 May 1891, from pneumonia following a bout of influenza of the sitting Liberal Unionist MP, Lord Edward Cavendish. Cavendish was a younger son of the Duke of Devonshire. Lord Cavendish had held the West Derbyshire seat, which was historically associated with the family of the Dukes of Devonshire, since its creation in 1885 first as a Liberal but after 1886, at which election he was returned unopposed, as a Liberal Unionist. Cavendish had also previously served as Liberal MP for East Sussex from 1865 – 1868 and for North Derbyshire from 1880– 1885.

== Candidates ==
At first it appeared that the by-election arising from Cavendish’s death would be contested. It was reported that the Liberal Unionists had approached Lord Edward’s son, the Hon.Victor Cavendish to take over from his father and that the Conservatives were also considering putting forward a candidate, Mr F C Arkwright of Willersley Castle, who had been Lord Edward’s opponent in 1885. In the end however the Tories did not follow up this suggestion and Arkwright himself was one of the signatories to Cavendish’s nomination papers.

Victor Cavendish quickly assented to run as his father’s successor as a Liberal Unionist and very much in his father’s shoes, identifying his political outlook and policy considerations as those previously held by Lord Edward. He stood, he said, for those principles of progress which his family had always supported, many measures of Liberal progress having been carried forward by the current Unionist government, with whose foreign policies he stated he was in complete agreement. In his address to the electorate, he placed himself within the Liberal, rather than the Conservative political tradition, but regretted the route the Gladstonian majority of the Liberal Party had chosen in seeking to identify the cause of Liberalism with what he described as constitutional changes inconsistent with the supremacy of Parliament, i.e. Irish Home Rule.

The Liberal Party had no candidate in the field and it was not expected they would wish to contest the election. However it was reported that the Liberals in Matlock were keen to fight the seat and proposed to consult with Francis Schnadhorst, the well-known Liberal organiser in the days of the Birmingham caucus and since 1877 secretary of the National Liberal Federation. There was no apparent enthusiasm amongst Gladstonian Liberals in London to engage in a contest however, on the contrary it was reported they wished to avoid an election at that time.

Nevertheless, Cavendish proceeded as if there would be a contested election, his agent arranging a series of public meetings in the constituency with guest speakers including Edward Heneage, Liberal Unionist MP for Great Grimsby and Sir Henry James, the MP for Bury.

== Result ==
The writ of election was received at Derby on 26 May and nomination day was set for 2 June at Bakewell Town Hall. Eight nomination papers were submitted for Cavendish and there being no other nominations he was therefore returned unopposed. He took his seat in the House of Commons on 8 June 1891 and represented West Derbyshire until 1908 when he succeeded to the peerage as the 9th Duke of Devonshire.

West Derbyshire by-election, 1891
Party	Candidate	Votes	%	±%
Liberal Unionist	Hon.Victor Cavendish	Unopposed	N/A	N/A
Liberal Unionist hold				

== See also ==
- 1900 West Derbyshire by-election
- 1967 West Derbyshire by-election
- 1986 West Derbyshire by-election
- List of United Kingdom by-elections
- United Kingdom by-election records
