= Speed limiter =

Governor used to limit the top speed of a vehicle

A speed limiter is a governor used to limit the top speed of a vehicle. For some classes of vehicles and in some jurisdictions they are a statutory requirement, for some other vehicles the manufacturer provides a non-statutory system which may be fixed or programmable by the driver.

== Statutory (UK) ==
=== Mopeds ===
The legal definition of a moped in the United Kingdom was revised in 1977 to include a maximum design speed of 30 mph (48 km/h). This was further revised to 50 km/h (31 mph) in the 1990s, then 45 km/h (28 mph) in the late 2000s to fall in line with unified European Union licensing regulations. (Note: Department for Transport (2008), p.179 "Mopeds redefined to 30 mph maximum design speed")

To comply with this, mopeds typically include some method of onboard speed restriction to prevent the machine exceeding the prescribed speed (on a flat road, in still air, with a rider of standard height and weight). Older models such as the Honda C50 used a simple centrifugal governor as part of the transmission, which progressively and severely advanced the ignition as speed rose past a set point, causing engine power to fall off rapidly at higher rpm and road speed, but maintaining the low- and moderate-speed hill climbing ability of the unrestricted version. Other systems achieved a similar result with simple restrictor flaps in the air intake, much like those used to restrict the power output of full-size motorcycles. Modern mopeds use electronic systems with speed sensors that can cut the ignition spark (and, where fitted, interrupt fuel injection) once measured speed reaches or exceeds the set point, maintaining full power right up to the limited speed.

Early restriction methods could be defeated by simple physical modifications (e.g. cutting out the restriction plate). Modern electronic limiters at the very least require replacing the friction rollers in a scooter's CVT, or even changing wheel size and/or reprogramming the engine management system, all in an effort to fool the sensors into detecting a lower than actual road speed.

=== Public service vehicles ===
Public service vehicles often have a legislated top speed. Scheduled coach services in the United Kingdom (and also bus services) are limited to either 65 mph (105 km/h) or 100 km/h (62 mph) depending on their age (newer coaches have the lower speed version installed, in line with harmonised EU regulations), though for city buses the use of limiters is to satisfy regulatory requirements, as many city buses cannot achieve these speeds even on an open roadway.

National speed limits for heavy goods vehicle (HGV) (>3.5 tonnes according to Vienna convention) in the European Union and in the United-Kingdom, on all roads including motorways Legend: = 60 km/h; = 70 km/h, = 80 km/h, = 90 km/h; = 100 km/h; = 110 km/h; = 112 km/h (70 mph) source Europa.eu

=== Heavy goods vehicles ===
HGVs in the UK have been subject to mandatory 60 mph (96 km/h) limiters since the early 1990s, which were subsequently revised to 90 km/h (56 mph) during EU harmonization.

== Non-statutory (UK) ==
Dynamic (ISA)

The newest form of speed limiters currently being deployed feature the ability to dynamically limit a vehicles top speed based upon a vehicles real time location and the road speed limit. The most popular of these systems is one called VMS with SpeedIQ from Sturdy Corporation. Dynamic speed limiters are being widely adopted by emergency service fleets due to their ability to limit a vehicles top speed during normal operations and then releasing to a higher maximum top speed when en route to an emergency. Additionally, fleets that operate in mixed geographic areas benefit greatly from a limiter that will allow a vehicle to travel at highway speeds as well as limit that vehicle to more commonly traveled residential neighborhoods at significantly lower speeds.

=== Programmable ===
European Citroën, BMW, Benz-Benz, Peugeot, Renault, Tesla as well as some Ford and Nissan car and van models have driver-controlled speed limiters fitted or available as an optional accessory which can be set by the driver to any desired speed; the limiter can be overridden if required by pressing hard on the accelerator. The limiter may be considered as setting the maximum speed (with throttle kickdown to override it) easing the throttle to reduce speed, whereas cruise control sets the minimum speed (with the brake pedal to override it) pressing on the throttle to increase speed. The limiter may shift down through automatic gears to hold the maximum speed.

The Bugatti Chiron also has a programmed speed limiter, although it can be (at least partially) lifted by the owner via a key. Once the key is inserted, the car conducts a brief diagnostic before allowing the owner to drive the car up to speeds of 420 km/h, (approx. 261 mph) provided it is deemed by the car's computer that the conditions allow. This is considerably faster than the top speed of 380 km/h (236 mph) that the car is usually restricted to. Top Speed Mode, as Bugatti dubs it, reduces the overall ride height and lowers the rear spoiler to help in the reduction of drag.

=== Fixed ===
In European markets, General Motors Europe sometimes allow certain high-powered Opel or Vauxhall cars to exceed the 250 km/h (155 mph) mark, whereas their Cadillacs do not. The Chrysler 300C SRT8 is limited to 270 km/h.

Most Japanese domestic market vehicles are limited to 180 km/h (112 mph). The limit for kei cars is 140 km/h (87 mph). These limits are self-imposed through the Japan Automobile Manufacturers Association and are not a legal requirement.

BMW, Mercedes-Benz, and others have entered into a gentlemen's agreement to a limit of 250 km/h (155 mph), but may 'unhook' their speed limited cars in Europe, and Mercedes-Benz will provide some vehicles in the U.S. without limiters for an additional price. There are also third-party companies who will re-flash vehicle computers with new software which will remove the speed limits and improve overall performance.

All Dodge Challenger and Charger models from the 2015 model year and up received a security update in June 2021 that allows you to set a security code so that if you type the incorrect code, the RPM is limited to idle speed (3 hp, 2 mph (3 km/h) and 66 lb⋅ft (89 N⋅m) of torque) to deter thieves.

Many small and medium-sized commercial vehicles are now routinely fitted with speed limiters as a manufacturer option, with a mind towards reducing fuel bills, maintenance costs, insurance premiums, discouraging employees from abusing company vehicles, and curbing speeding fines and bad publicity. These limiters are often set considerably lower than for passenger cars, typically at 56, 62, 68 or 70 mph (90, 100, 109 or 113 km/h) in the UK, with options for 75 and 81 km/h (47 and 50 mph) listed in countries where these speeds are legal. Often the fitting of a limiter is combined with a small warning sticker on the rear of the vehicle, stating its maximum speed, to discourage drivers who may themselves be delayed by having to follow it from tailgating or other aggressive driving intended to intimidate the lead driver into accelerating.

Similarly, most electric cars and vans which are not inherently limited by a low power output or "short" gearing tend to implement a maximum speed cap via their power controllers to prevent the rapid loss of battery charge and reduction in range caused by the greater power demands of high speeds; for example, the Smart ED, Nissan Leaf, Mitsubishi MiEV, and the Citroën Berlingo EV. The limits are typically in line with those of other deliberately limited vehicles for a balance that does not overly compromise either range or travel time; e.g. 90 km/h for the Berlingo and 100~120 km/h for the Smart (depending on version). The Leaf is an unusual case, being instead limited to a much higher 145 km/h (90 mph). Also, some supercars have speed limiters to prevent instability.

Some small economy cars have limiters because of stability and other safety concerns (short crumple zones, etc.), and to safeguard their small engines from the prolonged overrevving required to produce the power to achieve higher speeds. The first generation Smart was limited to 135 km/h (84 mph) (later generations were unlimited), and the Mitsubishi i to 130 km/h (81 mph).

Some heavy goods vehicle operators (typically big-name retailers rather than haulage contractors) further reduce their HGV limiters from 90 km/h to a lower speed, typically 85 or 80 km/h (53 or 50 mph), in a claimed bid to reduce fuel consumption and emissions. This is again often highlighted by a warning sticker on the truck's tailgate.

== See also ==
- Intelligent speed adaptation
- Rev limiter
