= 1900 West Derbyshire by-election =

UK parliamentary by-election

The 1900 West Derbyshire by-election was a parliamentary by-election held for the House of Commons of the United Kingdom constituency of West Derbyshire on 11 December 1900.

== Vacancy ==
Under the provisions of the Succession to the Crown Act 1707 and a number of subsequent Acts, MPs appointed to certain ministerial and legal offices were at this time required to seek re-election. The vacancy in West Derbyshire was caused by the appointment of the sitting Liberal Unionist Member of Parliament (MP), Victor Cavendish to become Treasurer of the Household, a formal title held by one of the government’s Deputy Chief Whips in the House of Commons.

== Candidates ==
Victor Cavendish had held the seat since he inherited it from his father Lord Edward Cavendish at a by-election in 1891. At the previous general elections in 1895 and in 1900 just a few weeks earlier, he had been unopposed and clearly the Liberals were unprepared with a candidate and reluctant to contest such a safe seat at a by-election so soon after a general election. Cavendish fought the seat again in the Liberal Unionist interest.

== Result ==
The writ of election was received at Derby on 5 December and nomination day was set for 11 December. There being no other nominations Cavendish was returned unopposed. He held the post of Treasurer of the Household in the Unionist government until 1903.

West Derbyshire by-election, 1900
Party	Candidate	Votes	%	±%
Liberal Unionist	Victor Cavendish	Unopposed	N/A	N/A
Liberal Unionist hold				

== See also ==
- 1891 West Derbyshire by-election
- 1967 West Derbyshire by-election
- 1986 West Derbyshire by-election
- List of United Kingdom by-elections
- United Kingdom by-election records
