= Patrick McLoughlin =

British politician (born 1957)

The Right Honourable The Lord McLoughlin CH PC
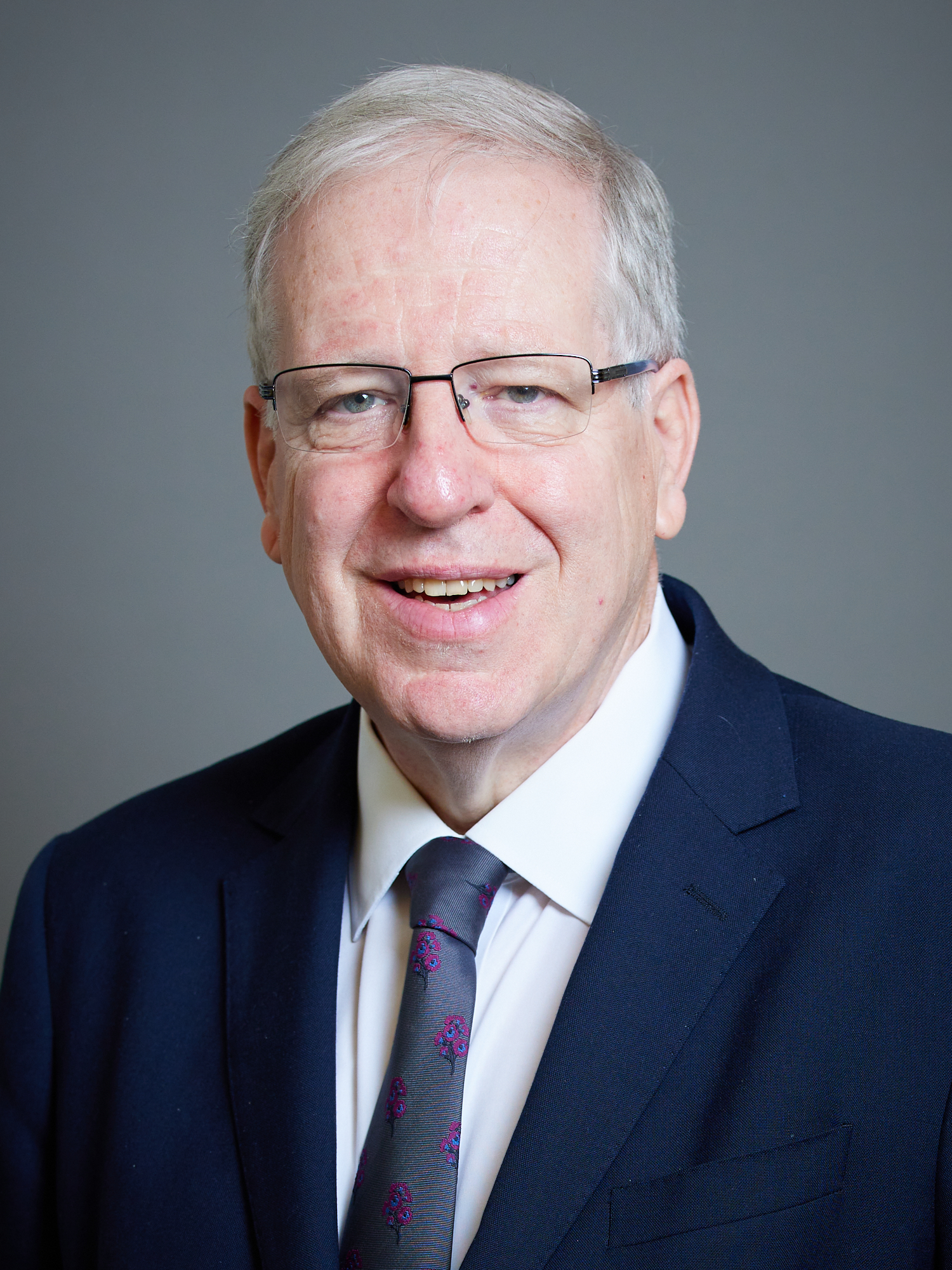
- Official portrait, 2022

Chancellor of the Duchy of Lancaster
- In office 14 July 2016 – 8 January 2018
- Prime Minister: Theresa May
- Preceded by: Oliver Letwin
- Succeeded by: David Lidington

Chairman of the Conservative Party
- In office 14 July 2016 – 8 January 2018
- Leader: Theresa May
- Preceded by: The Lord Feldman of Elstree
- Succeeded by: Brandon Lewis

Secretary of State for Transport
- In office 4 September 2012 – 14 July 2016
- Prime Minister: David Cameron
- Preceded by: Justine Greening
- Succeeded by: Chris Grayling

Government Chief Whip in the House of Commons Parliamentary Secretary to the Treasury
- In office 12 May 2010 – 4 September 2012
- Prime Minister: David Cameron
- Preceded by: Nick Brown
- Succeeded by: Andrew Mitchell

Opposition Chief Whip in the House of Commons
- In office 7 December 2005 – 11 May 2010
- Leader: David Cameron
- Preceded by: David Maclean
- Succeeded by: Nick Brown

Opposition Deputy Chief Whip in the House of Commons
- In office 1 June 1998 – 7 December 2005
- Leader: William Hague; Iain Duncan Smith; Michael Howard
- Preceded by: Peter Ainsworth
- Succeeded by: John Randall
Junior ministerial offices
Lord Commissioner of the Treasury
In office 23 July 1996 – 2 May 1997
Prime Minister	John Major
Preceded by	Liam Fox
Succeeded by	Jon Owen Jones
Parliamentary Under-Secretary of State for Industry
In office 27 May 1993 – 20 July 1994
Prime Minister	John Major
Preceded by	Edward Leigh
Succeeded by	Charles Wardle
Parliamentary Under-Secretary of State for Employment
In office 14 April 1992 – 27 May 1993
Prime Minister	John Major
Preceded by	Eric Forth
Succeeded by	Ann Widdecombe
Parliamentary Under-Secretary of State for Roads and Motoring
In office 25 July 1989 – 14 April 1992
Prime Minister	Margaret Thatcher; John Major
Preceded by	Peter Bottomley
Succeeded by	Kenneth Carlisle
Parliamentary offices
Member of the House of Lords
Lord Temporal
Life peerage 8 September 2020
Member of Parliament for Derbyshire Dales West Derbyshire (1986–2010)
In office 8 May 1986 – 6 November 2019
Preceded by	Matthew Parris
Succeeded by	Sarah Dines

Chair of Transport for the North
- Incumbent
- Assumed office 26 January 2022
- Preceded by: Louise Gittins (acting)

Personal details
- Born: Patrick Allen McLoughlin; 30 November 1957 (age 68) Stafford, Staffordshire, England
- Party: Conservative
- Spouse: Lynne Newman (m. 1984)
- Children: 2
- Education: South Staffordshire College

Patrick Allen McLoughlin, Baron McLoughlin (born 30 November 1957) is a British politician. A member of the Conservative Party, he first became the Member of Parliament (MP) for West Derbyshire following the 1986 by-election. The constituency became the Derbyshire Dales for the 2010 general election. McLoughlin remained the seat's MP until 2019, and was made a life peer the following year.

As a former miner, he is one of the few Conservative parliamentarians to have been a manual worker before being elected to Parliament. On 4 September 2012, he was appointed Secretary of State for Transport. On 14 July 2016, he became Chairman of the Conservative Party and Chancellor of the Duchy of Lancaster, under the new administration of Conservative Prime Minister Theresa May. He resigned as chairman on 8 January 2018 and was succeeded by Brandon Lewis. In January 2022, he was announced as the new chair of Transport for the North.

== Early life and career ==
McLoughlin was born in Stafford on 30 November 1957, the son and grandson of coal miners. He was educated at the Cardinal Griffin Roman Catholic School in Cannock, Staffordshire, and Staffordshire College of Agriculture at Rodbaston College. From 1974, he worked for five years as a farm worker and, after 1979, worked underground at the Littleton Colliery in Cannock. He was a member of the National Union of Mineworkers, and became an industrial representative for the National Coal Board's Western Area Marketing Department.

McLoughlin was elected as a councillor on Cannock Chase District Council, serving for seven years from 1980, and was a councillor on Staffordshire County Council from 1981 to 1987. In 1982, McLoughlin served as the Chairman of the National Young Conservatives.

Coal miners in Staffordshire were split in support of the NUM miners' strike of 1984–85. McLoughlin did not support the strike, and later came to national attention when he stood up at the 1984 Conservative Party Conference to announce that he was a working miner. He moved from underground belt attendant to Area Marketing representative in September 1985, five months after the end of the strike.

McLoughlin unsuccessfully contested Wolverhampton South East at the 1983 general election, losing to the sitting Labour MP Robert Edwards by 5,000 votes.

== Parliamentary career ==
Matthew Parris, then Conservative MP for West Derbyshire, had resigned from the House of Commons to pursue a media career and McLoughlin was chosen to contest the 1986 by-election. He held the seat, albeit very narrowly, with a 100 majority.

In Parliament, McLoughlin served as the parliamentary private secretary, initially to Angela Rumbold (Minister of State at the Department for Education and Science (1987–88) and then to David Young, Secretary of State for Trade and Industry (1988–89). McLoughlin was made a parliamentary under-secretary of state by Prime Minister Margaret Thatcher in 1989, and served in the Department for Transport until 1992, when he was moved by Prime Minister John Major to serve in the same position at the Department of Employment. A year later, McLoughlin was moved to the Department of Trade and Industry.

He joined the government as Assistant Whip in 1995, becoming a Lord Commissioner in 1996. Following the Conservative Party's defeat at the 1997 general election, he remained in the whips' office in opposition, becoming the Deputy Chief Whip in 1998. He was then promoted to Chief Whip by David Cameron in 2005. McLoughlin has also served on many select committees. As Opposition Chief Whip, he was sworn of the Privy Council in June 2005.

Following boundary changes, the West Derbyshire constituency was abolished at the 2010 general election, and McLoughlin was elected to the successor seat of Derbyshire Dales, achieving exactly the same number of votes. Prime Minister David Cameron appointed McLoughlin as the government's Chief Whip and Parliamentary Secretary to the Treasury in the Conservative-Liberal Democrat coalition government. During his tenure as Chief Whip, he was reprimanded by the Speaker John Bercow for shouting in the House of Commons.

=== Transport Secretary ===
In a government reshuffle in September 2012, McLoughlin was appointed Secretary of State for Transport. Much of the media considered him a strange choice for the position, as he represented "the most landlocked constituency in the country", and suffers from a fear of flying. Soon after his appointment, he had to cancel the award of the InterCity West Coast franchise due to major technical flaws in the bidding process.

As Transport Secretary, McLoughlin oversaw large-scale government investment in rail in the wake of increasing passenger numbers in the years following rail privatisation. From 2014 to 2019, £38 billion of improvement works were planned, including Crossrail, the Thameslink Programme, electrification of the Great Western Main Line and the Northern Powerhouse scheme to boost transport links in the North of England.

In 2017, construction began on HS2, a high-speed link between major cities that will "triple the long-distance capacity to the North of England" as well as freeing up the West Coast Main Line for freight and commuter trains. In 2015, McLoughlin said "So the argument has been won. HS2 will be built, the full ‘Y’ network, from London to Birmingham and Birmingham to Manchester and Leeds. HS2 will change the transport architecture of the north. But it will also change the economic architecture."

In November 2013, he made a speech praising the impact of the privatisation of British Rail, saying that "Privatisation sparked a railway renaissance. Since 1993, passenger journeys have doubled in the UK to a level not seen since the 1920s. On a network roughly the same size as 15 years ago, today our railway is running 4,000 more services a day. And rail freight has grown by 60%. Revenue is up more than £3 billion since privatisation, almost all of it due to higher passenger numbers rather than fare rises. Safety levels are at an all time high. Punctuality is at near record levels. And passenger satisfaction is up by 10% over the past decade." However, a number of academics and journalists disputed this and subsequently argued that the evidence suggested the privatisation had largely failed, creating new inefficiencies, failing to create genuine competition and seeing steep rises in costs to passengers.

In December 2015, he announced the winners of the Northern and TransPennine Express franchises which include new trains, services and free wifi, saying "Arriva Rail North and First TransPennine Express went far beyond our requirements with exciting, ambitious plans that will make a real difference to customers, and – coupled with our commitment to push ahead with electrifying the vital TransPennine route – will help the region realise its full economic potential, ensuring it has a modern 21st century transport system."

McLoughlin's efforts to meet and pacify Cumbrian residents of Pooley Bridge and Soulsby following the 2015 floods were ridiculed in The Independent when the ministerial party arrived on the wrong side of the collapsed bridge. The paper compared the event to a scene from the BBC comedy The Thick of It.

McLoughlin oversaw the beginning of the £15 billion road upgrade package to improve routes and add lanes.

Following the resignation of David Cameron as Prime Minister following the UK's vote to leave the European Union on 23 June 2016, McLoughlin was made Conservative Party chairman by new Prime Minister Theresa May on 14 July 2016. He was appointed Knight Bachelor in the 2016 Prime Minister's Resignation Honours, by his colleague in the Conservative Party, for political and public service.

=== Chairman of the Conservative Party ===
In a 24 July 2016 interview on The Andrew Marr Show, Patrick McLoughlin said "Article 50 of the Lisbon Treaty will be triggered before the next general election. It's very clear that Brexit means Brexit. Brexit means that we're coming out of the European Union. We want to see our own borders under our own control."

McLoughlin stepped down as Chairman of the Conservative Party on 8 January 2018, saying that he had had "a very good run" and was replaced by Brandon Lewis. He also resigned as Chancellor of the Duchy of Lancaster, with David Lidington being his successor. Prior to his resignation, McLoughlin had come under increasing pressure to resign from colleagues in the Conservative Party over the disappointing performance of the party in the 2017 general election and various issues with the most recent party conference.

=== After the Commons ===
McLoughlin was appointed Chairman of Visit Britain. He served until 2023.

In January 2022, McLoughlin was appointed as Chair of Transport for the North. At the time of the appointment, he said: "I believe firmly in the potential of the North of England and know from my personal experience and professional career just how vital reliable, cost-effective and sustainable transport is to people and business."

==== Peerage ====
McLoughlin was nominated for a life peerage in the 2019 Dissolution Honours. He was created Baron McLoughlin, of Cannock Chase in the County of Staffordshire on 8 September 2020. Lord McLoughlin made his maiden speech on 11 November 2020, remembering his time as a whip, meeting Lord Cormack and being a member of the cabinet in the Cameron/Clegg Years. In 2025, he was appointed chair of the Services Committee.

== Personal life ==
He is married to Lynn McLoughlin, whom he employed as a Senior Parliamentary Assistant on a salary up to £40,000. His son James was also employed by the Conservative Party as a special adviser to the Prime Minister Theresa May.

== Styles ==
- 1957–1986: Mr Patrick McLoughlin
- 1986–2005: Mr Patrick McLoughlin MP
- 2005–2016: The Rt Hon Patrick McLoughlin MP
- 2016–2019: The Rt Hon Sir Patrick McLoughlin MP
- 2019–2019: The Rt Hon Sir Patrick McLoughlin CH MP
- 2019–2020: The Rt Hon Sir Patrick McLoughlin CH
- 2020–present: The Rt Hon The Lord McLoughlin CH PC

== Honours ==
- He was sworn in as a member of Her Majesty's Most Honourable Privy Council in 2005. This gave him the honorific title "The Right Honourable" for life.
- He was awarded Honorary Membership of the Carlton Club in 2010 while he was government Chief Whip.
- He was appointed a Knight Bachelor in the 2016 Prime Minister's Resignation Honours. This gave him the honorific title "Sir".
- He was appointed as a member of the Order of the Companions of Honour in the 2019 Prime Minister's Resignation Honours. This gave him the post-nominal letters "CH" for life.
- He was created a life peer in 2020.

Parliament of the United Kingdom
Preceded by Matthew Parris	Member of Parliament for West Derbyshire; 1986–2010	Constituency abolished
New constituency	Member of Parliament for Derbyshire Dales; 2010–2019	Succeeded by Sarah Dines
Political offices
Preceded by David Maclean	Opposition Chief Whip in the House of Commons; 2005–2010	Succeeded by Nick Brown
Preceded by Nick Brown	Government Chief Whip in the House of Commons; 2010–2012	Succeeded by Andrew Mitchell
Preceded by Nick Brown	Parliamentary Secretary to the Treasury; 2010–2012	Succeeded by Andrew Mitchell
Preceded by Justine Greening	Secretary of State for Transport; 2012–2016	Succeeded by Chris Grayling
Preceded by Oliver Letwin	Chancellor of the Duchy of Lancaster; 2016–2018	Succeeded by David Lidington
Party political offices
Preceded by Peter Ainsworth	Conservative Deputy Chief Whip in the House of Commons; 1998–2005	Succeeded by John Randall
Preceded by David Maclean	Conservative Chief Whip in the House of Commons; 2005–2012	Succeeded by Andrew Mitchell
Preceded by The Lord Feldman of Elstree	Chairman of the Conservative Party; 2016–2018	Succeeded by Brandon Lewis
Orders of precedence in the United Kingdom
Preceded by The Lord Sarfraz	Gentlemen; Baron McLoughlin	Followed by The Lord Moylan
