= 1986 West Derbyshire by-election =

UK parliamentary by-election

- 8 May 1986

Constituency of West Derbyshire
- Turnout: 71.9% (▼5.5%)
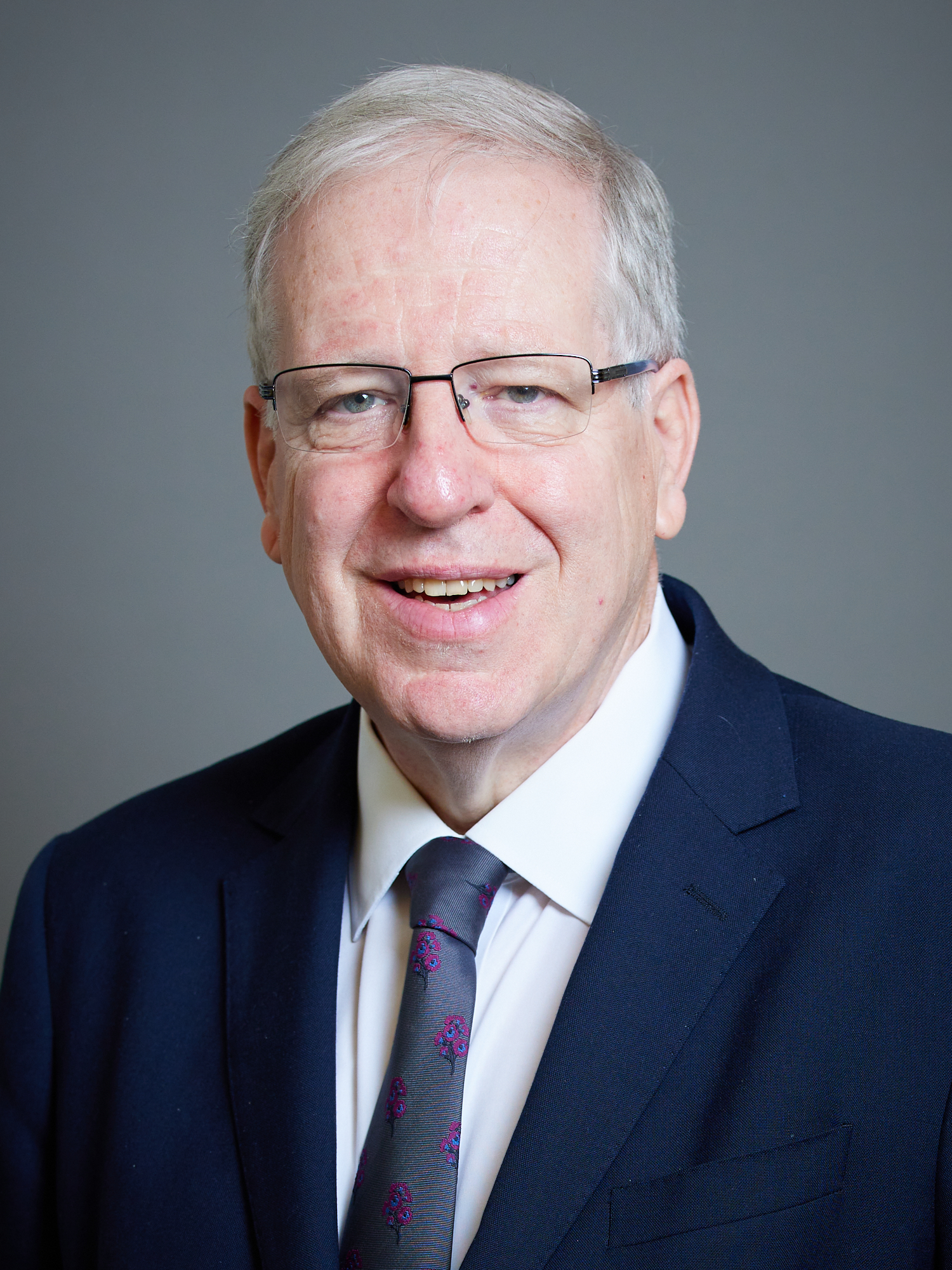
	First party	Second party	Third party
		Lib	Lab
Candidate	Patrick McLoughlin	Christopher Walmsley	William Moore
Party	Conservative	Liberal	Labour
Popular vote	19,896	19,796	9,952
Percentage	39.5%	39.4%	19.8%
Swing	▼16.3%	▲12.3%	▲2.7%
MP before election
Matthew Parris
Conservative
Subsequent MP
Patrick McLoughlin
Conservative

The 1986 West Derbyshire by-election was held on 8 May 1986 when the sitting Conservative Party Member of Parliament, Matthew Parris, took the Chiltern Hundreds and resigned, in order to become the presenter of Weekend World for ITV.

The election was held on the same day as the 1986 local elections and the Ryedale by-election.

During the campaign, Parris told Vincent Hanna on Newsnight that he thought Labour could gain the seat from the Conservatives. In his memoirs, he admitted that he deliberately misled both Hanna and the audience to prevent a Liberal victory.

"had I not lied in an interview with the late Vincent Hanna, a BBC pollster carrying out a poll which most improbably suggested that Labour and not the Liberal Democrats [sic] were the challengers in this by-election, [the Liberals] would have won. I knew what I said was false."

Despite a large swing away from him, 28-year-old Patrick McLoughlin of the Conservative Party (who went on to serve in The Cabinet from 2010 to 2018) beat the Liberal Party candidate by 100 votes, and he remained the MP for the seat until his retirement in 2019.

West Derbyshire by-election, 1986
Party	Candidate	Votes	%	±%
Conservative	Patrick McLoughlin	19,896	39.5	−16.4
Liberal	Christopher Walmsley	19,796	39.4	+12.4
Labour	William Moore	9,952	19.8	+2.7
Rainbow Alliance Loony Crocodile Tears	Christopher Sidwell	348	0.7	New
Independent	Robert Goodall	289	0.6	New
Majority		100	0.1	−28.8
Turnout		50,281	71.9	−5.5
Conservative hold		Swing		

== See also ==
- 1891 West Derbyshire by-election
- 1900 West Derbyshire by-election
- 1967 West Derbyshire by-election
