= Soulsby =

Soulsby may refer to:

- Ben Soulsby, lumbermill owner and founder of Soulsbyville, California, USA
- Heidi Soulsby, British politician from Guernsey
- Henry Soulsby, builder of the 1926 Soulsby Service Station on U.S. Route 66 in Mount Olive, Illinois.
- James Soulsby (1897–1980), English footballer
- Lawson Soulsby, Baron Soulsby of Swaffham Prior (1926–2017), British microbiologist and parasitologist
- Sir Peter Soulsby (born 1948), British politician, Mayor of Leicester
- Sir William Soulsby (1851–1937), English barrister, Private Secretary to the Lord Mayor of London
