= 1944 West Derbyshire by-election =

UK Parliamentary by-election

← 1938	17 February 1944	1945 →
- Turnout: 65.4% (▼14.0%)
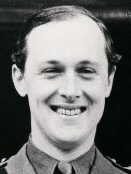
	First party	Second party
	IL
Candidate	Charles Frederick White	Marquess of Hartington
Party	Independent Labour	Conservative
Popular vote	16,336	11,775
Percentage	57.7%	41.5%
Swing	▲25.2%	▼7.1%
MP before election
Henry Hunloke
Conservative
Subsequent MP
Charles Frederick White
Independent Labour

The 1944 West Derbyshire by-election was held on 17 February 1944. The by-election was held due to the resignation of the incumbent Conservative MP, Henry Hunloke. Hunloke was the brother-in-law of Edward Cavendish, 10th Duke of Devonshire, who had held the seat from 1923 until 1938, when he succeeded to his title and was replaced by Hunloke. The seat had been held previously by Hunloke's father-in-law (1891-1908, before becoming the 9th Duke), and by the 9th Duke's brother-in-law, the future 6th Marquess of Lansdowne (1908-1918).

This control by the Cavendish family had been interrupted in 1918-1923 by Charles Frederick White, who was elected as a Liberal. White died in 1923. His son, also Charles Frederick White, had stood for the seat in the 1938 by-election as a Labour candidate, but lost to Hunloke by 5,500 votes.

The resignation of Hunloke was due to the imminent collapse of his marriage (he was divorced from his Cavendish wife the next year and remarried immediately). The Conservative Party then selected the Marquess of Hartington, the 10th Duke's eldest son and heir, as their candidate.

The major parties had formed a national unity government during World War II and agreed that no by-elections would be contested during the war. In contravention of this agreement, Charles Frederick White stood in the by-election as an Independent Labour candidate.

In an acrimonious campaign, White pressed for social change, securing the support of local Labour activists. White won, defeating Cavendish by over 4,000 votes, a swing of 9,000 from 1938.

Once in Parliament, White took the official Labour whip.

West Derbyshire by-election, 1944
Party	Candidate	Votes	%	±%
Independent Labour	Charles Frederick White	16,336	57.7	N/A
Conservative	Marquess of Hartington	11,775	41.5	N/A
Agriculturalist	Robert Goodall	233	0.8	New
Majority		4,561	16.2	N/A
Turnout		28,344	65.4	N/A
Independent Labour gain from Conservative		Swing		
