= West Derbyshire (constituency) =

Parliamentary constituency in the United Kingdom, 1885–2010

Coordinates: 53.10°N 1.65°W

- Former county constituency for the House of Commons
- Boundary of West Derbyshire in Derbyshire for the 2005 general election

- Location of Derbyshire within England
- County: Derbyshire
- Major settlements: Bakewell, Matlock, Wirksworth

1885–2010
- Seats: One
- Created from: North Derbyshire
- Replaced by: Derbyshire Dales

West Derbyshire was a county constituency represented in the House of Commons of the Parliament of the United Kingdom. From 1885, until it was replaced by the Derbyshire Dales constituency in the 2010 general election, it elected one Member of Parliament (MP) by the first past the post voting system. It was a safe Conservative seat for most of its existence.

== Boundaries ==
This was the only really safe Conservative seat in Derbyshire, consisting mostly of rural villages and tourist towns like Bakewell and Matlock; Labour's only strengths were in Wirksworth and Masson, not enough to end the long-standing Conservative representation of this seat.

=== Boundary review ===
Following their review of parliamentary representation in Derbyshire, the Boundary Commission for England created a new constituency of Derbyshire Dales based on the existing West Derbyshire constituency.

== History ==
Historically associated with the Cavendish family, the seat and its predecessors were usually represented by one of the future Dukes of Devonshire or their relatives from 1580 until the Second World War. When the Cavendish family left the Liberals over Irish Home Rule the seat stayed loyal to them as they sat first as Liberal Unionists then as Conservatives. In 1918 the hold on the constituency was briefly broken by Charles Frederick White standing for the Liberals, but the seat was regained in 1923. In a by-election in 1944, White's son, also called Charles Frederick White resigned as the official Labour nominee in order to stand against the wartime party truce. He defeated the Conservative candidate, William Cavendish, Marquess of Hartington, and subsequently took the Labour whip in the Commons, holding the seat in the 1945 general election for Labour. The Conservatives regained the seat in the 1950 general election and held it with mostly safe majorities thereafter, with Liberal-affiliated candidates being their main challengers from 1974 onwards, with the closest they came to losing being in the 1986 by-election when they held it by only 100 votes in a period of heavy unpopularity for the government of Margaret Thatcher. The seat changed its name (with minor boundary changes) to Derbyshire Dales in 2010.

== Members of Parliament ==
Year	Member	Whip
1885	Lord Edward Cavendish	Liberal
1886	Lord Edward Cavendish	Liberal Unionist
1891	Victor Cavendish	Liberal Unionist
1908	Henry Petty-Fitzmaurice, Earl of Kerry	Liberal Unionist
1918	Charles White	Liberal
1923	Edward Cavendish, Marquess of Hartington	Unionist
1938	Henry Hunloke	Conservative
1944	Charles White Jr.	Independent Labour
1945	Charles White Jr.	Labour
1950	Edward Wakefield	Conservative
1962	Aidan Crawley	Conservative
1967	James Scott-Hopkins	Conservative
1979	Matthew Parris	Conservative
1986	Patrick McLoughlin	Conservative
2010	constituency abolished	

== Elections ==
=== Elections in the 1880s ===
General election 1885: West Derbyshire
Party	Candidate	Votes	%	±%
Liberal	Edward Cavendish	5,020	54.8	
Conservative	Frederic Charles Arkwright	4,138	45.2	
Majority		882	9.6	
Turnout		9,158	88.8	
Registered electors		10,310		
Liberal win (new seat)				

General election 1886: West Derbyshire
Party	Candidate	Votes	%	±%
Liberal Unionist	Edward Cavendish	Unopposed		
Liberal Unionist gain from Liberal				

=== Elections in the 1890s ===
1891 West Derbyshire by-election
Party	Candidate	Votes	%	±%
Liberal Unionist	Victor Cavendish	Unopposed		
Liberal Unionist hold				

General election 1892: West Derbyshire
Party	Candidate	Votes	%	±%
Liberal Unionist	Victor Cavendish	5,961	68.3	N/A
Liberal	Hugh MacDermot	2,768	31.7	New
Majority		3,193	36.6	N/A
Turnout		8,729	73.0	N/A
Registered electors		11,956		
Liberal Unionist hold		Swing	N/A	

General election 1895: West Derbyshire
Party	Candidate	Votes	%	±%
Liberal Unionist	Victor Cavendish	Unopposed		
Liberal Unionist hold				

=== Elections in the 1900s ===
General election 1900: West Derbyshire
Party	Candidate	Votes	%	±%
Liberal Unionist	Victor Cavendish	Unopposed		
Liberal Unionist hold				

1900 West Derbyshire by-election
Party	Candidate	Votes	%	±%
Liberal Unionist	Victor Cavendish	Unopposed		
Liberal Unionist hold				

General election 1906: West Derbyshire
Party	Candidate	Votes	%	±%
Liberal Unionist	Victor Cavendish	5,283	52.8	N/A
Liberal	Edward Hinmers	4,724	47.2	New
Majority		559	5.6	N/A
Turnout		10,007	87.5	N/A
Registered electors		11,443		
Liberal Unionist hold		Swing	N/A	

1908 West Derbyshire by-election
Party	Candidate	Votes	%	±%
Liberal Unionist	Henry Petty-Fitzmaurice, Earl of Kerry	Unopposed		
Liberal Unionist hold				

=== Elections in the 1910s ===
General election January 1910: West Derbyshire
Party	Candidate	Votes	%	±%
Liberal Unionist	Henry Petty-Fitzmaurice, Earl of Kerry	5,974	54.8	+2.0
Liberal	Edward Hinmers	4,925	45.2	−2.0
Majority		1,049	9.6	+4.0
Turnout		10,899	91.1	+3.6
Registered electors		11,962		
Liberal Unionist hold		Swing	+2.0	

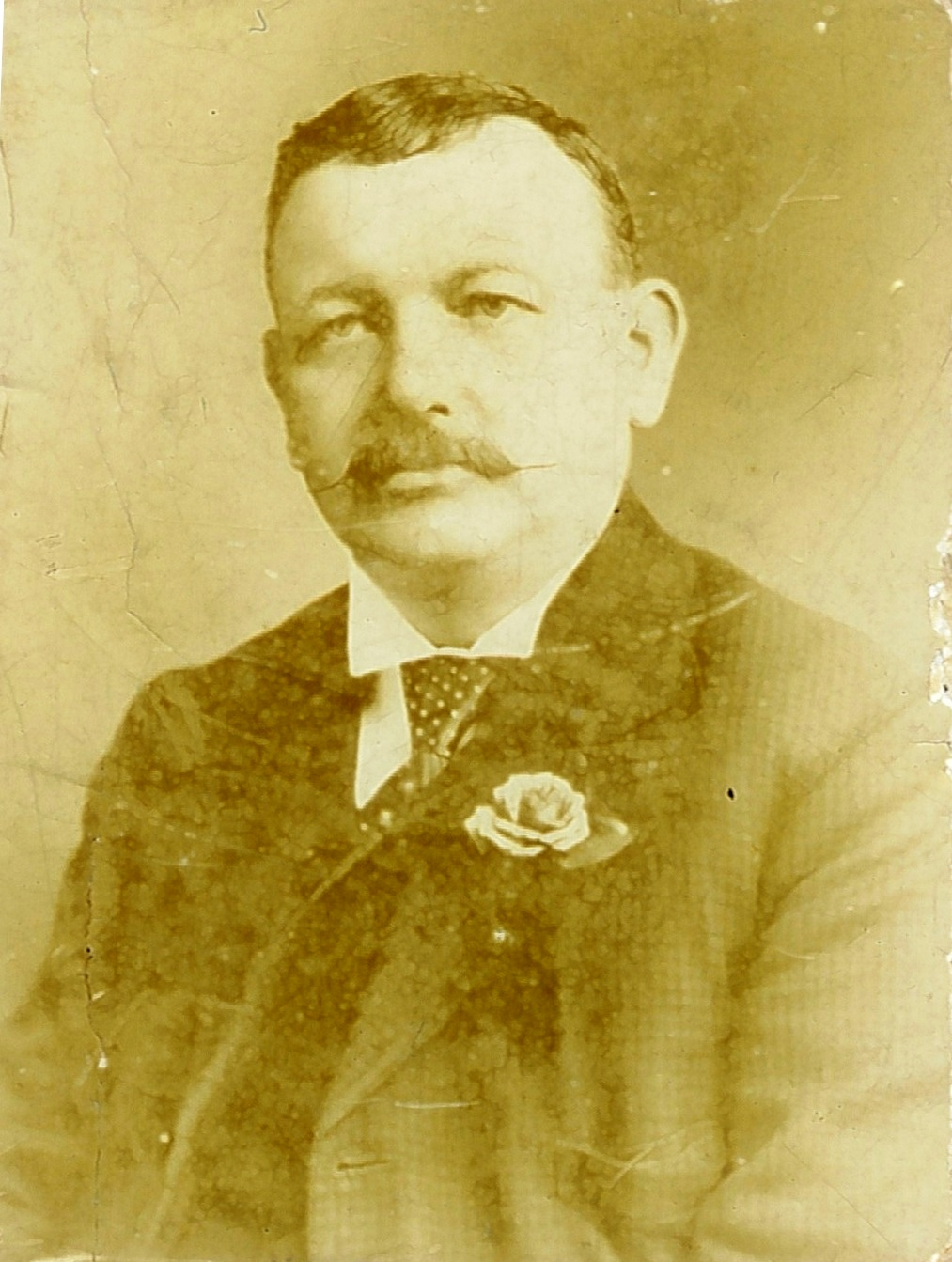
White

General election December 1910: West Derbyshire
Party	Candidate	Votes	%	±%
Liberal Unionist	Henry Petty-Fitzmaurice, Earl of Kerry	5,624	55.2	+0.4
Liberal	Charles White	4,564	44.8	−0.4
Majority		1,060	10.4	+0.8
Turnout		10,188	85.2	−5.9
Registered electors		11,962		
Liberal Unionist hold		Swing	+0.4	

General Election 1914–15:

Another General Election was required to take place before the end of 1915. The political parties had been making preparations for an election to take place and by July 1914, the following candidates had been selected;

- Unionist:Henry Petty-Fitzmaurice, Earl of Kerry
- Liberal: Charles White

White

General election 1918: Derbyshire West
Party		Candidate	Votes	%	±%
	Liberal	Charles White	10,752	55.6	+10.8
C	Unionist	Henry Petty-Fitzmaurice, Earl of Kerry	8,592	44.4	−10.8
Majority			2,160	11.2	N/A
Turnout			19,344	66.0	−19.2
Registered electors			29,323		
	Liberal gain from Unionist		Swing	+10.8	
C indicates candidate endorsed by the coalition government.

=== Elections in the 1920s ===
General election 1922: Derbyshire West
Party	Candidate	Votes	%	±%
Liberal	Charles White	13,060	50.2	−5.4
Unionist	Edward Cavendish, Marquess of Hartington	12,973	49.8	+5.4
Majority		87	0.4	−10.8
Turnout		26,033	86.1	+20.1
Registered electors		30,231		
Liberal hold		Swing	−5.4	

General election 1923: Derbyshire West
Party	Candidate	Votes	%	±%
Unionist	Edward Cavendish, Marquess of Hartington	13,419	50.9	+1.1
Liberal	William Christopher Mallison	12,966	49.1	−1.1
Majority		453	1.8	N/A
Turnout		26,385	84.9	−1.2
Registered electors		31,067		
Unionist gain from Liberal		Swing	+1.1	

General election 1924: Derbyshire West
Party	Candidate	Votes	%	±%
Unionist	Edward Cavendish, Marquess of Hartington	15,324	56.9	+6.0
Liberal	William Christopher Mallison	11,612	43.1	−6.0
Majority		3,712	13.8	+12.0
Turnout		26,936	84.8	−0.1
Registered electors		31,757		
Unionist hold		Swing	+6.0	

General election 1929: Derbyshire West
Party	Candidate	Votes	%	±%
Unionist	Edward Cavendish, Marquess of Hartington	16,760	49.7	−7.2
Liberal	William Christopher Mallison	13,277	39.4	−3.7
Labour	William Wilkinson	3,660	10.9	New
Majority		3,483	10.3	−3.5
Turnout		33,697	83.2	−1.6
Registered electors		40,487		
Unionist hold		Swing	−1.8	

=== Elections in the 1930s ===
General election 1931: West Derbyshire
Party	Candidate	Votes	%	±%
Conservative	Edward Cavendish, Marquess of Hartington	Unopposed	N/A	N/A
Conservative hold				

General election 1935: West Derbyshire
Party	Candidate	Votes	%	±%
Conservative	Edward Cavendish, Marquess of Hartington	Unopposed	N/A	N/A
Conservative hold				

1938 West Derbyshire by-election
Party	Candidate	Votes	%	±%
Conservative	Henry Hunloke	16,740	48.6	N/A
Labour	Charles White Jr	11,216	32.5	New
Liberal	Milner Gray	6,515	18.9	New
Majority		5,524	16.1	N/A
Turnout		34,471	79.4	N/A
Conservative hold		Swing	N/A	

General Election 1939–40

Another General Election was required to take place before the end of 1940. The political parties had been making preparations for an election to take place from 1939 and by the end of this year, the following candidates had been selected;

- Conservative: Henry Hunloke
- Labour: Charles White Jr
- Liberal: James Ivor Waddington

=== Elections in the 1940s ===
1944 West Derbyshire by-election
Party	Candidate	Votes	%	±%
Independent Labour	Charles White Jr	16,336	57.7	N/A
Conservative	William Cavendish, Marquess of Hartington	11,775	41.5	N/A
Agriculturalist	Robert Goodall	233	0.8	New
Majority		4,561	16.2	N/A
Turnout		28,344	65.4	N/A
Independent Labour gain from Conservative		Swing		

General election 1945: West Derbyshire
Party	Candidate	Votes	%	±%
Labour	Charles White Jr	18,331	48.8	+16.3
Conservative	William Aitken	18,175	48.4	−0.2
Agriculturalist	Robert Goodall	1,068	2.8	N/A
Majority		156	0.4	N/A
Turnout		37,574	81.7	+2.3
Labour gain from Conservative		Swing		

=== Elections in the 1950s ===
General election 1950: West Derbyshire
Party	Candidate	Votes	%	±%
Conservative	Edward Wakefield	20,015	51.9	+3.5
Labour	N. Gratton	13,478	35.0	−13.8
Liberal	George Frederick Strange	5,070	13.2	New
Majority		6,537	16.9	N/A
Turnout		33,563	87.5	+5.8
Conservative gain from Labour		Swing		

General election 1951: West Derbyshire
Party	Candidate	Votes	%	±%
Conservative	Edward Wakefield	22,223	58.8	+6.9
Labour	Ronald Lewis	15,578	41.2	+6.2
Majority		6,645	17.6	+0.7
Turnout		37,801	84.4	−3.1
Conservative hold		Swing		

General election 1955: West Derbyshire
Party	Candidate	Votes	%	±%
Conservative	Edward Wakefield	21,052	59.6	+0.8
Labour	Robert B. Stirling	14,296	40.4	−0.8
Majority		6,756	19.2	+1.6
Turnout		35,348	80.0	−4.4
Conservative hold		Swing		

General election 1959: West Derbyshire
Party	Candidate	Votes	%	±%
Conservative	Edward Wakefield	22,034	61.3	+1.7
Labour	Albert E. Kitts	13,925	38.7	−1.7
Majority		8,109	22.6	+3.4
Turnout		35,959	82.0	+2.0
Conservative hold		Swing		

=== Elections in the 1960s ===
1962 West Derbyshire by-election
Party	Candidate	Votes	%	±%
Conservative	Aidan Crawley	12,455	36.0	−25.3
Liberal	Ronald Gardner-Thorpe	11,235	32.5	New
Labour	John Dilks	9,431	27.2	−11.5
Independent	Raymond Gregory	1,433	4.1	New
Majority		1,220	3.5	−19.1
Turnout		34,554		
Conservative hold		Swing		

General election 1964: West Derbyshire
Party	Candidate	Votes	%	±%
Conservative	Aidan Crawley	16,825	44.2	−18.1
Liberal	Ronald Gardner-Thorpe	11,559	30.4	N/A
Labour	John Dilks	9,669	25.4	−13.3
Majority		5,266	13.8	−8.8
Turnout		38,053	85.8	+3.8
Conservative hold		Swing		

General election 1966: West Derbyshire
Party	Candidate	Votes	%	±%
Conservative	Aidan Crawley	18,383	49.6	+5.4
Labour	Phillip Whitehead	13,791	37.2	+11.8
Liberal	Peggy Edwards	4,874	13.2	−17.2
Majority		4,592	12.4	−1.4
Turnout		37,048	83.4	−2.4
Conservative hold		Swing		

1967 West Derbyshire by-election
Party	Candidate	Votes	%	±%
Conservative	James Scott-Hopkins	16,319	56.7	+7.1
Liberal	Michael Aza Pinney	5,696	19.8	+6.6
Labour	Robin Corbett	5,284	18.3	−18.9
Independent	Robert Goodall	1,496	5.2	New
Majority		10,623	36.9	+24.5
Turnout		28,795	64.5	−18.9
Conservative hold		Swing	+13.0	

=== Elections in the 1970s ===
General election 1970: West Derbyshire
Party	Candidate	Votes	%	±%
Conservative	James Scott-Hopkins	22,692	61.9	+12.3
Labour	Fred Inglis	13,976	38.1	+0.9
Majority		8,716	23.8	+11.4
Turnout		36,668	76.7	−6.7
Conservative hold		Swing		

General election February 1974: West Derbyshire
Party	Candidate	Votes	%	±%
Conservative	James Scott-Hopkins	19,941	48.7	−13.2
Liberal	Peter Worboys	11,481	28.0	New
Labour	Fred Inglis	9,529	23.3	−14.8
Majority		8,460	20.7	−3.1
Turnout		40,951	61.8	−14.9
Conservative hold		Swing		

General election October 1974: West Derbyshire
Party	Candidate	Votes	%	±%
Conservative	James Scott-Hopkins	18,468	47.9	−0.8
Liberal	Peter Worboys	10,622	27.6	−0.4
Labour	David Townsend	9,456	24.5	+1.2
Majority		7,846	20.3	−0.4
Turnout		38,546	57.6	−4.2
Conservative hold		Swing		

General election 1979: West Derbyshire
Party	Candidate	Votes	%	±%
Conservative	Matthew Parris	21,478	52.6	+4.7
Liberal	Peter Worboys	11,261	27.6	0.0
Labour	William Moore	8,134	19.9	−4.6
Majority		10,217	25.0	+4.7
Turnout		40,873	80.7	+23.1
Conservative hold		Swing		

=== Elections in the 1980s ===
General election 1983: West Derbyshire
Party	Candidate	Votes	%	±%
Conservative	Matthew Parris	29,695	55.9	+3.3
Liberal	Viv Bingham	14,370	27.0	−0.6
Labour	John March	9,060	17.1	−2.8
Majority		15,325	28.9	+3.9
Turnout		53,125	77.4	−3.3
Conservative hold		Swing		

1986 West Derbyshire by-election
Party	Candidate	Votes	%	±%
Conservative	Patrick McLoughlin	19,896	39.5	−16.4
Liberal	Christopher Walmsley	19,796	39.4	+12.4
Labour	William Moore	9,952	19.8	+2.7
Rainbow Dream Ticket	R. C. Sidwell	348	0.7	New
Independent	Robert Goodall	289	0.6	New
Majority		100	0.1	−28.8
Turnout		50,281	71.9	−5.5
Conservative hold		Swing		

General election 1987: West Derbyshire
Party	Candidate	Votes	%	±%
Conservative	Patrick McLoughlin	31,224	53.1	−2.8
Liberal	Christopher Walmsley	20,697	35.2	+8.2
Labour	William Moore	6,875	11.7	−5.4
Majority		10,527	17.9	−11.0
Turnout		58,796	83.1	+5.7
Conservative hold		Swing		

=== Elections in the 1990s ===
General election 1992: West Derbyshire
Party	Candidate	Votes	%	±%
Conservative	Patrick McLoughlin	32,879	54.3	+1.2
Liberal Democrats	RD Fearn	14,110	23.3	−11.9
Labour	Stephen J Clamp	13,528	22.4	+10.7
Majority		18,769	31.0	+13.1
Turnout		60,517	85.0	+1.9
Conservative hold		Swing	+6.6	

General election 1997: West Derbyshire
Party	Candidate	Votes	%	±%
Conservative	Patrick McLoughlin	23,945	42.1	
Labour	Stephen J Clamp	19,060	33.5	
Liberal Democrats	Christopher Seeley	9,940	17.5	
Referendum	John Gouriet	2,499	4.4	New
Independent Green	Godfrey Meynell	593	1.0	New
UKIP	Hugh Price	484	0.9	New
Monster Raving Loony	"The Flying Brick" Delves	281	0.5	New
Independent Back to Basics	Martin Kyslun	81	0.1	New
Majority		4,885	8.6	
Turnout		56,883	78.2	
Conservative hold		Swing		

=== Elections in the 2000s ===
General election 2001: West Derbyshire
Party	Candidate	Votes	%	±%
Conservative	Patrick McLoughlin	24,280	48.0	+5.9
Labour	Stephen J Clamp	16,910	33.4	−0.1
Liberal Democrats	Jeremy Beckett	7,922	15.7	−1.8
UKIP	Stuart Bavester	672	1.3	+0.4
Monster Raving Loony	"The Flying Brick" Delves	472	0.9	+0.4
Independent	Robert Goodall	333	0.7	New
Majority		7,370	14.6	+6.0
Turnout		50,589	67.8	−10.4
Conservative hold		Swing		

General election 2005: West Derbyshire
Party	Candidate	Votes	%	±%
Conservative	Patrick McLoughlin	24,378	47.7	−0.3
Labour	David Menon	13,625	26.6	−6.8
Liberal Democrats	Ray Dring	11,408	22.3	+6.6
UKIP	Michael Cruddas	1,322	2.6	+1.3
Monster Raving Loony	"The Flying Brick" Delves	405	0.8	−0.1
Independent	Martin Kyslun	5	0.0	New
Majority		10,753	21.0	+6.4
Turnout		51,143	69.2	+1.4
Conservative hold		Swing	+3.2	

== See also ==
- Parliamentary constituencies in Derbyshire

== Notes and references ==
Craig, F. W. S. (1983). British parliamentary election results 1918–1949 (3 ed.). Chichester: Parliamentary Research Services. ISBN 0-900178-06-X.

== Sources ==
- Guardian Unlimited Politics (Election results from 1992 to the present)
- http://www.psr.keele.ac.uk/ (Election results from 1951 to the present)
