= Henry Petty-Fitzmaurice =

Henry Petty-Fitzmaurice may refer to:

- Henry Petty-Fitzmaurice, 3rd Marquess of Lansdowne (1780 – 1863), British politician
- Henry Petty-Fitzmaurice, 4th Marquess of Lansdowne (1816 – 1866), British politician
- Henry Petty-Fitzmaurice, 5th Marquess of Lansdowne (1845 – 1927), British politician and Irish peer, Governor-General of Canada
- Henry Petty-Fitzmaurice, 6th Marquess of Lansdowne (1872 – 1936), British soldier and politician
