= Mary Cavendish, Duchess of Devonshire =

British aristocrat and courtier (1895–1988)

Her Grace The Duchess of Devonshire GCVO CBE
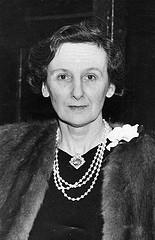
- The Duchess in 1944

Mistress of the Robes
- In office 1953–1967
- Monarch: Elizabeth II
- Preceded by: None
- Succeeded by: Countess of Euston

Personal details
- Born: Mary Alice Gascoyne-Cecil; 29 July 1895 Hatfield, Hertfordshire, England
- Died: 24 December 1988 (aged 93) Westminster, London, England
- Spouse: Edward Cavendish, 10th Duke of Devonshire (m. 1917; died 1950)
- Children: 5, including: William Cavendish, Marquess of Hartington; Andrew Cavendish, 11th Duke of Devonshire; Lady Elizabeth Cavendish; Lady Anne Tree
- Parent: James Gascoyne-Cecil, 4th Marquess of Salisbury (father)

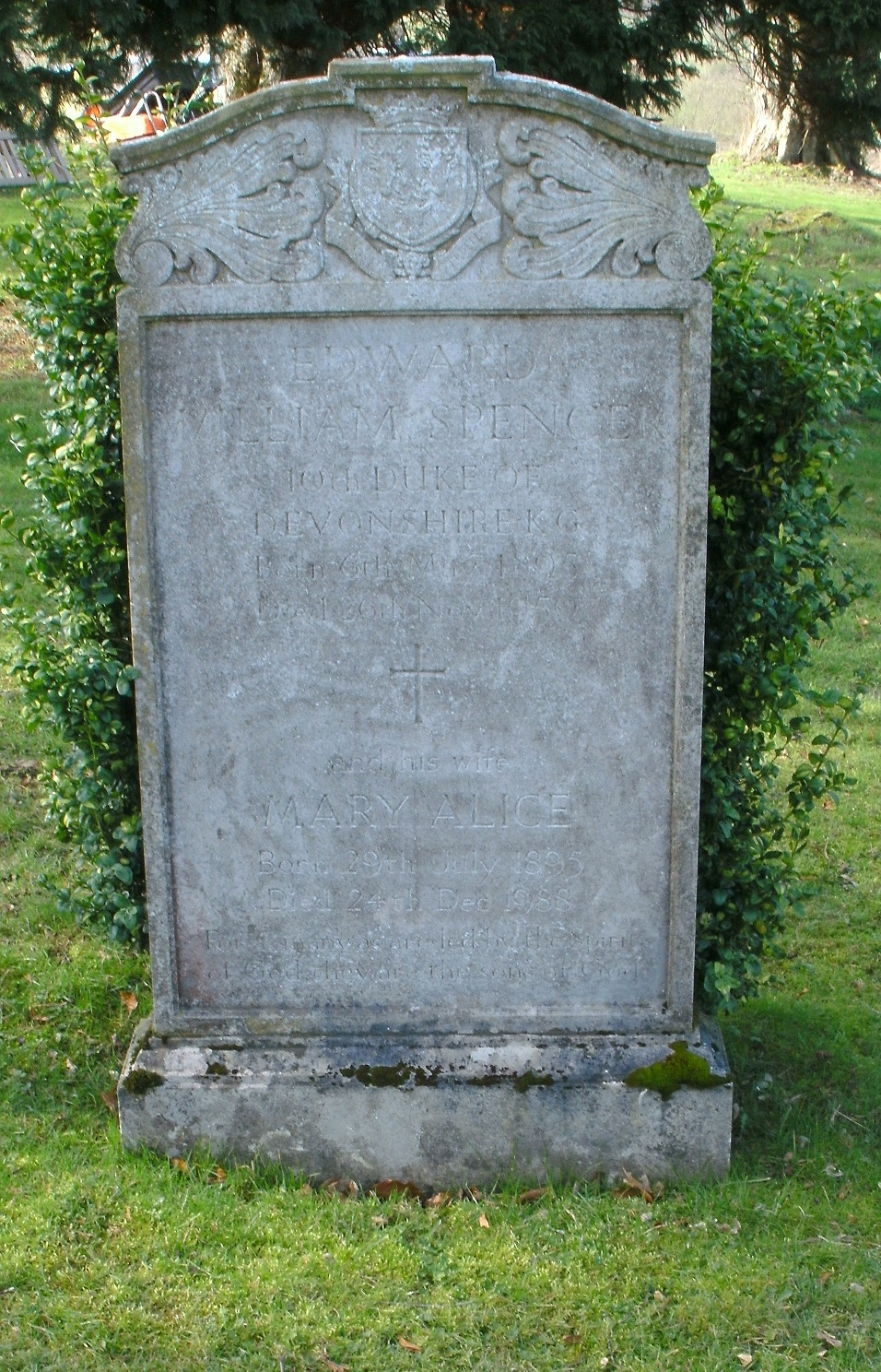
St Peter's Churchyard, Edensor - grave of the Duchess of Devonshire and her husband, the 10th Duke

Mary Alice Cavendish, Duchess of Devonshire (née Gascoyne-Cecil; 29 July 1895 – 24 December 1988) was a British courtier who served as Mistress of the Robes to Queen Elizabeth II from 1953 to 1967. She was the granddaughter of Prime Minister Robert Gascoyne-Cecil, 3rd Marquess of Salisbury.

== Early life ==
She was born the Honourable Mary Alice Gascoyne-Cecil in Hatfield, Hertfordshire, on 29 July 1895. She was the second daughter of James Gascoyne-Cecil, Viscount Cranborne, and Lady Cicely Alice Gore, who served as Extra Lady of the Bedchamber to Queen Alexandra. Her maternal grandparents were Arthur Gore, 5th Earl of Arran and Lady Edith Jocelyn (daughter of Robert Jocelyn, Viscount Jocelyn, and sister of Robert Jocelyn, 4th Earl of Roden). Her paternal grandparents were Robert Gascoyne-Cecil, 3rd Marquess of Salisbury and the former Georgiana Alderson (eldest daughter of Sir Edward Hall Alderson, a Baron of the Exchequer).

In 1903, her father succeeded as the Marquess of Salisbury and she was styled Lady Mary Gascoyne-Cecil. Her older brother, Robert became the 5th Marquess of Salisbury upon their father's death in 1947. Her younger brother, Lord David Cecil, was a prominent biographer, historian and academic.

== Functions ==
She was Mistress of the Robes to Elizabeth II from 1953 to 1967 and Chancellor of the University of Exeter from 1955 to 1972. She was awarded Hon. LLD (Exon) in 1956.

The Duchess of Devonshire had an interest in Jacob sheep and kept a flock at Chatsworth House in Derbyshire. When a breed society, the Jacob Sheep Society, was formed in July 1969, she became its first president. From 1972 onwards, the society published a flock book.

== Marriage and children ==
On 21 April 1917, Lady Mary was married to Edward Cavendish, Marquess of Hartington. Edward was the eldest son of Victor Cavendish, 9th Duke of Devonshire, and his wife, Evelyn Cavendish, Duchess of Devonshire (eldest daughter of Henry Petty-Fitzmaurice, 5th Marquess of Lansdowne). In 1938, he succeeded his father as the 10th Duke of Devonshire. They had five children: William John Robert Cavendish, Marquess of Hartington;Andrew Robert Buxton Cavendish, 11th Duke of Devonshire; Lady Mary Cavendish; Lady Elizabeth Georgiana Alice Cavendish; Lady Anne Evelyn Beatrice Cavendish.

On 26 November 1950, her husband Edward Cavendish, 10th Duke of Devonshire, had a heart attack and died at Compton Place while being attended by John Bodkin Adams, the suspected serial killer. In the process of transferring his assets to his son, the death of the Duke fell 10 weeks prior to the end of a required 5-year period, and his estate was subjected to taxes of 80%.

== Honours ==
She was appointed a Commander of the Order of the British Empire (CBE) in 1946 and a Dame Grand Cross of the Royal Victorian Order (GCVO) in 1955.

Coat of arms of Mary Cavendish, Duchess of Devonshire
Escutcheon Edward Cavendish, 10th Duke of Devonshire (Sable three bucks' heads cabossed Argent) impaling James Gascoyne-Cecil, 4th Marquess of Salisbury (Quarterly 1st & 4th barry of ten Argent and Azure over all six escutcheons Sable three two and one each charged with a lion rampant of the first 2nd & 3rd Argent on a pale Sable a conger's head erased and erect Or charged with an Ermine spot.

== Death ==
The Duchess died in Westminster, London, aged 93, and is buried next to her husband in the churchyard at Edensor, Derbyshire, near Chatsworth.

Court offices
Preceded by —	Mistress of the Robes to Queen Elizabeth II; 1953–1967	Succeeded by Countess of Euston
Academic offices
Preceded by —	Chancellor of the University of Exeter; 1955–1972	Succeeded by The Viscount Amory
