= Kathleen Cavendish, Marchioness of Hartington =

American socialite, sister of John F. Kennedy (1920–1948)

Marchioness of Hartington
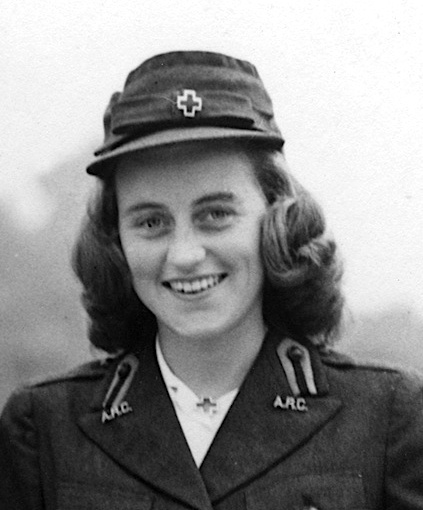
- Kennedy in 1944, when she was a member of the American Red Cross stationed in England

Personal details
- Born: Kathleen Agnes Kennedy; February 20, 1920 Brookline, Massachusetts, U.S.
- Died: May 13, 1948 (aged 28) Saint-Bauzile, Ardèche, France
- Cause of death: Airplane crash
- Resting place: St Peter's Church, Edensor, Derbyshire, England
- Spouse: William Cavendish, Marquess of Hartington (m. 1944; died 1944)
- Parent(s): Joseph P. Kennedy Sr. Rose Fitzgerald
- Relatives: Kennedy family (by birth); Cavendish family (by marriage)
- Education: Riverdale Country School; Noroton Convent of the Sacred Heart; Holy Child Convent
- Alma mater: Queen's College, London; Finch School; Florida Commercial College

Kathleen Agnes Cavendish, Marchioness of Hartington (née Kennedy; February 20, 1920 – May 13, 1948), also known as "Kick" Kennedy, was an American socialite. She was the second daughter of Joseph P. Kennedy Sr. and Rose Fitzgerald, a sister of U.S. President John F. Kennedy and Senators Robert F. Kennedy and Ted Kennedy, and the wife of the Marquess of Hartington, heir apparent to the 10th Duke of Devonshire.

When her father was serving as U.S. Ambassador to the United Kingdom, Kathleen made many friends in London and was the "debutante of 1938". Working with the Red Cross, she began a romantic relationship with Lord Hartington, whom she married in May 1944. He was killed on active service in Belgium only four months later. Kathleen died in a plane crash in 1948, flying to the south of France while on vacation with her new partner, the 8th Earl Fitzwilliam.

== Early life and education ==
Kennedy was born on February 20, 1920, at home in Brookline, Massachusetts, the fourth child and second daughter of Joseph P. Kennedy Sr. and Rose Fitzgerald. She was nicknamed "Kick" because of her "irrepressible nature". Kennedy was especially close to her older brother John known as "Jack". Her other siblings were Joseph Jr., Rosemary, Eunice, Patricia, Robert, known as "Bobby", Jean, and Edward, known as "Ted".

Kennedy was educated at Riverdale Country School in the Riverdale section of the Bronx, New York City. She also attended Noroton Convent of the Sacred Heart in Noroton, Connecticut, and the Holy Child Convent in Neuilly, France. While the Kennedy daughters were not raised to pursue political ambitions like their brothers, they were provided with many of the same educational and social opportunities, owing to their father's powerful financial and political connections and influence. This was particularly the case when President Franklin D. Roosevelt appointed Joseph as United States ambassador to the United Kingdom in 1938.

As a child, Kennedy was very athletic and played football with her brothers. An account cited that this stemmed from the ethos of competition that her father instilled in his young children. They were split into teams and would compete in sports at the family compound in Hyannis Port, Massachusetts. Her optimism and high spirits attracted many suitors, some of whom were Jack's closest friends. Eventually, Kennedy started to date and had her first serious relationship with W. R. Grace and Company heir J. Peter Grace.

== Britain ==
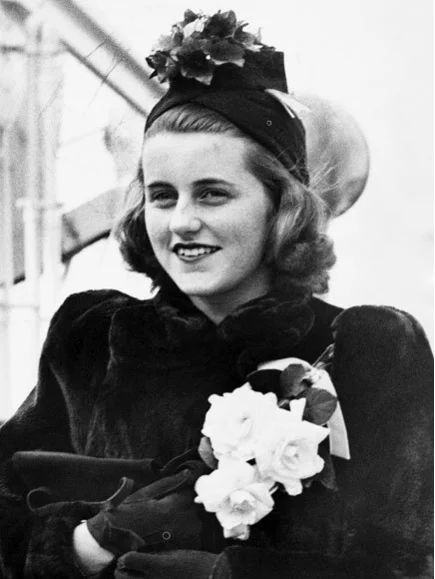
Kennedy in 1938, prior to meeting King George VI and Queen Elizabeth

Kathleen's time in Britain during her father's term as ambassador dramatically influenced the remainder of her life. While living in England, she was educated in London at Queen's College and quickly cultivated a wide circle of friends both male and female in British high society. She dated David Rockefeller and was declared the "debutante of 1938" by the English media when she made her debut at the Queen Charlotte's Ball.

Following the German invasion of Poland and the outbreak of World War II in September 1939, Kick, who was staying at the family home in the south of France, had to rush to England with her friend Janey Kenyon Slaney. The Kennedy family, to save Joseph and daughter Rosemary, returned to the United States. Kathleen, having become very fond of England and the many friends she had made during her two years there, petitioned her parents to remain in London despite the coming danger. However, she was overruled by her father and sailed back home in the early fall of 1939.

After returning to the United States, Kennedy enrolled at the Finch School for a time and then attended Florida Commercial College. In addition to her studies, she began volunteer work for the American Red Cross. In 1941, she decided to leave school and began work as a research assistant for Frank Waldrop, executive editor of the Washington Times-Herald. She later teamed with Inga Arvad, who wrote the "Did You Happen to See....." column, and was eventually given her own column for reviewing films and plays.

== Marriage ==
In 1943, seeking a way to return to England, Kathleen signed up to work in a center for servicemen set up by the Red Cross. During her time in England both before and particularly during the war, she grew increasingly more independent from her family and the Catholic Church, to which the family belonged. During this time, Kennedy began a romantic relationship with politician William Cavendish, Marquess of Hartington (usually known to his family and friends as Billy Hartington). He was the eldest son and heir apparent of the 10th Duke of Devonshire.

The two had met and begun a friendship when she moved to England when her father was appointed American ambassador. Despite objections from her mother, Kennedy and Lord Hartington reunited upon her return to England. Rose especially rejected their relationship because she saw that their marriage would break canon law by allowing Kathleen's children to be raised as Anglicans rather than as Catholics. Rose even tried to manipulate their relationship by keeping Kathleen away from Hartington and postponing a possible wedding. Regardless, Kathleen married Hartington on May 6, 1944, in a civil ceremony at the Caxton Hall Register Office. Kathleen's eldest brother, Joseph P. Kennedy Jr., an officer in the U.S. Navy, to whom she had grown close during the last year of his life, as he was serving in Britain, was the only member of the family to attend the ceremony. Her second-eldest brother, John, was still hospitalized due to a back injury incurred on motor torpedo patrol boat PT-109 in the South Pacific Ocean, and younger brother Robert F. Kennedy was in naval training. Three months later, on August 12, Joe Jr. was killed when his plane exploded over the English Channel during a top-secret bombing mission to Europe.

== Widowhood ==
Kathleen, now Marchioness of Hartington, and Lord Hartington spent less than five weeks together before he went off to fight in France. Four months after their wedding and less than a month after Joe Jr. was killed, Hartington was killed by a sniper during a battle with the Germans in Belgium. With his family's blessing, he was buried close to where he fell. His younger brother Lord Andrew Cavendish, who was married to Deborah Mitford, youngest of the Mitford sisters, thus became the heir apparent to the dukedom, as Billy Hartington had left no heir. From then on, she was called Kathleen, Dowager Marchioness of Hartington.

Popular on the London social circuit and admired by many for her high spirits and wit, Lady Hartington eventually became romantically involved with the 8th Earl Fitzwilliam, who was in the process of divorcing his wife. Once again, Rose Kennedy expressed her disapproval of her daughter's suitor and warned Kathleen that she would be disowned and cut off financially if she married Lord Fitzwilliam. In May 1948, Kathleen learned that her father would be traveling to Paris. In an effort to gain his consent for her upcoming plans to marry Fitzwilliam, she decided to fly to Paris to meet with her father.

== Death ==
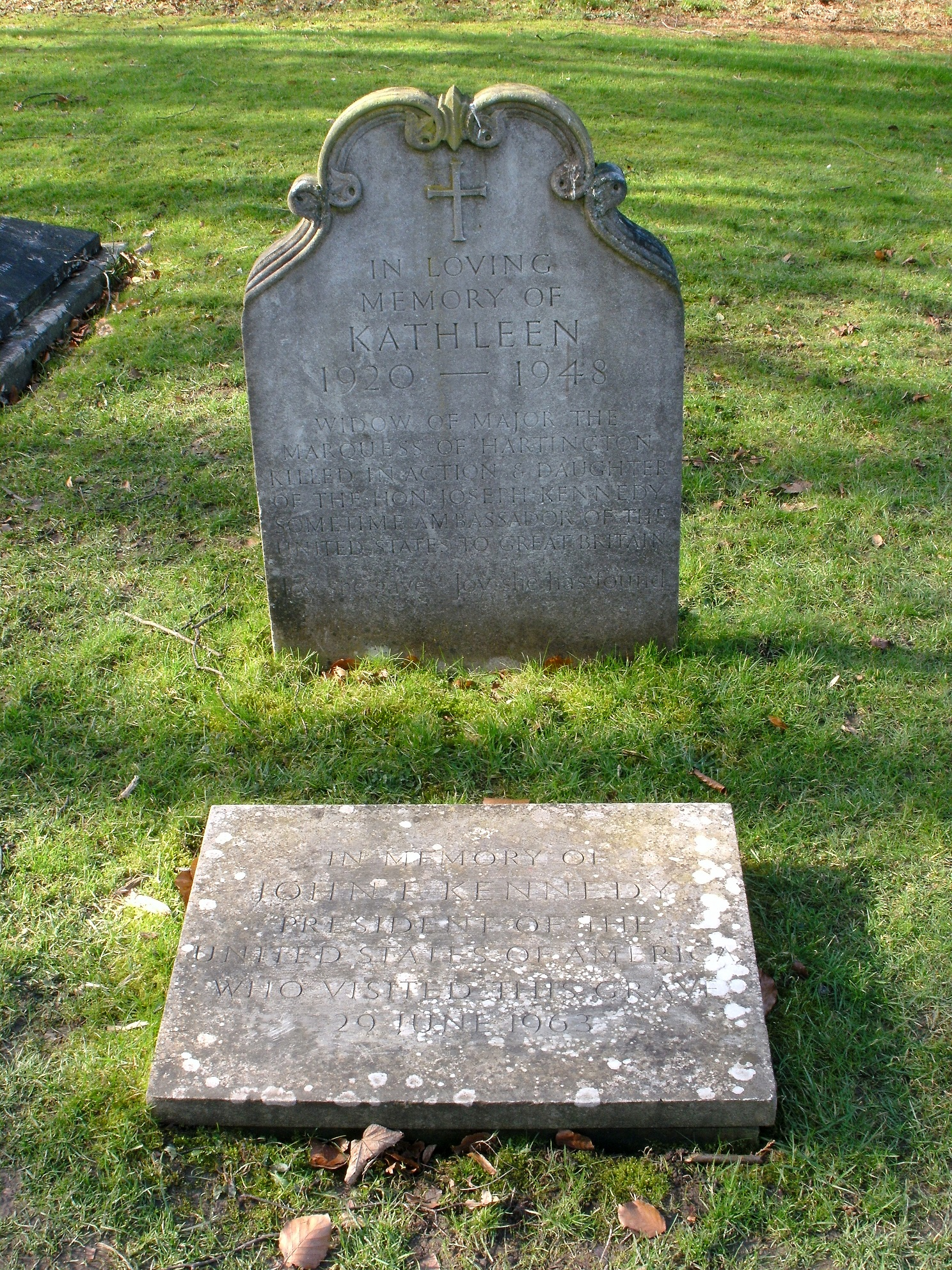
Cavendish's gravesite in St Peter's Churchyard, Edensor, which is marked with a headstone and a plaque in the ground commemorating the visit of 35th U.S. President John F. Kennedy at the gravesite; her gravestone reads, "Joy she gave joy she has found".

On May 13, 1948, Lady Hartington and Lord Fitzwilliam were flying from Paris to the French Riviera for a vacation aboard a de Havilland DH.104 Dove. At 3:30 in the afternoon, their plane took off, reaching an altitude of 10,000 feet (3,000 m). Approximately one hour into the flight, radio contact was lost with the plane when it entered the region near Vienne, which was also close to the center of a storm. The plane's four occupants endured 20 minutes of severe turbulence that bounced their small plane up and down as much as several thousand feet at a time.

When they finally cleared the clouds, they instantly discovered the plane was in a dive and moments away from impact, and they attempted to pull up. The stress of the turbulence, coupled with the sudden change of direction, tore loose one of the wings, followed by both engines and finally the tail. The plane's fuselage then spun into the ground seconds later, coming to rest nose down in a ravine after striking terrain at Plateau du Coiron, near Saint-Bauzile, Ardèche, France. Lady Hartington was killed instantly, along with Fitzwilliam, pilot Peter Townshend, and navigator Arthur Freeman.

Lady Hartington was buried at the Cavendish family burial grounds at St Peter's Churchyard, Edensor outside of Chatsworth, Derbyshire, England. Her father was the only family member to attend the funeral, arranged by the Devonshires. Rose Kennedy refused to attend her daughter's funeral, instead entering a hospital for medical reasons. Her brother Jack was too devastated and could not bring himself to go to the funeral as a result.

== Popular culture ==
The Kennedy Debutante, a novelization of Kennedy's life, was published by Berkley Books in 2018. Written by Kerri Maher, it was well received, including being named a Best Book of the Week by the New York Post.

Kathleen Kennedy is portrayed by Darleen Carr in the 1977 TV movie Young Joe, the Forgotten Kennedy, by Tracy Pollan in the 1990 TV miniseries The Kennedys of Massachusetts and by Robin Tunney in the 1993 TV miniseries JFK: Reckless Youth.

== Legacy ==
The gymnasium at Manhattanville College in Purchase, New York, is named in Kathleen Kennedy's honor. Robert F. Kennedy named his eldest daughter (b. 1951) in memory of his late sister. Likewise, his son Robert F. Kennedy Jr. named his second child, a daughter (b. 1988), in memory of his late aunt.

== See also ==
- Chatsworth House
- Duke of Devonshire
- Kennedy curse
