= 1908 West Derbyshire by-election =

UK Parliamentary by-election

The 1908 West Derbyshire by-election was held on 15 April 1908. The by-election was held due to the succession to the peerage of the incumbent Liberal Unionist MP, Victor Cavendish, who became the ninth Duke of Devonshire. It was retained by the unopposed Liberal Unionist candidate Henry Petty-Fitzmaurice.
