= Fred Inglis =

Frederick Charles Inglis (born 17 May 1937) is Emeritus Professor of Cultural Studies at the University of Sheffield in the UK. Previously Professor of Cultural Studies at the University of Warwick, he has been a member of the School of Social Science at the Institute for Advanced Study, Princeton, Fellow-in-Residence at the Netherlands Institute for Advanced Study, and Visiting Fellow Humanities Research Centre, Australian National University, Canberra.

He was born in Stockton-on-Tees, County Durham, and was educated at the fee-paying Oundle School in Northamptonshire. He graduated from Gonville and Caius College, Cambridge, in 1960 with a degree in English Literature, before studying for his MPhil at Southampton University while employed there as a government research fellow. His two doctorates (PhD, DSc) were awarded by the University of Bristol on the basis of published work.

Inglis has frequently written for The Nation, the New Statesman and The Independent and contributes regularly to BBC Radio. He is a member of the Fabian Society and has stood as a Labour Party candidate for the UK Parliament on four occasions. In 1970 and February 1974 he fought West Derbyshire, going on to contest Cheltenham in October 1974 and Winchester in 1987, but he was beaten by the Conservatives on each occasion.

== Principal publications ==
- History Man: the Life of R. G. Collingwood, Princeton: Princeton University Press, 2009.
- A Short History of Celebrity, Princeton: Princeton University Press, 2010.
- Culture: key concepts in the social sciences, Cambridge and Cambridge MA: Polity Press, 198 pp. 2004.
- People's Witness: the journalist in modern politics, London and New Haven: Yale University Press, 2002, 416pp.
- The Delicious History of the Holiday, London and New York: Routledge, 2000, 206pp + 23 illustrations.
- Clifford Geertz: culture, custom and ethics, Cambridge and Cambridge MA: Polity Press, 2000, 206pp.
- Raymond Williams: the life, London and New York: Routledge, 1995, xx + 332pp.
- Cultural Studies, Oxford and Cambridge MA: Basil Blackwell, 1993, 270pp.
- The Cruel Peace: everyday life and the Cold War, New York: Basic Books, 1991, xx + 402pp, London: Aurum Books, 1992.
- Media Theory, Oxford and Cambridge: Basil Blackwell, 1990, 214pp + tables (translated into Japanese and Portuguese 1993; into Croatian 1997; into Finnish 1998).
- Radical Earnestness: English social theory 1880-1980, Oxford and Cambridge MA: Martin Robertson with Basil Blackwell, 1982, 253pp.
