= Henry Hunloke =

British Conservative politician (1906–1978)

Lieutenant-Colonel Henry Hunloke TD

Member of Parliament for West Derbyshire
- In office 1938–1944
- Preceded by: Marquess of Hartington
- Succeeded by: Charles Frederick White, Jr.

Personal details
- Born: Henry Philip Hunloke; 27 December 1906 Marylebone, London
- Died: 13 January 1978 (aged 71) Marlborough, Wiltshire
- Party: Conservative
- Spouses: Lady Anne Cavendish (m. 1929; div. 1945) Virginia Archer Clive (m. 1945; div. 1972): Ruth Holdsworth
- Relations: John Postle Heseltine (grandfather); Sophia Sidney, Baroness De L'Isle and Dudley (great-grandmother)
- Children: 5
- Parent(s): Philip Hunloke; Sylvia Heseltine

Lieutenant-Colonel Henry Philip Hunloke TD (27 December 1906 – 13 January 1978) was a British Conservative politician.

== Early life ==
Hunloke was born in Marylebone, London, the only son of Philip Hunloke and the former Sylvia Heseltine. He had two siblings, Alberta Diana Hunloke (wife of Sir George Paynter) and Joan Cecil Hunloke (wife of banker Philip Fleming, uncle of Ian Fleming, the creator of James Bond).

His maternal grandfather was the painter and art collector John Postle Heseltine of Walhampton. His paternal grandparents were Capt. Philip Perceval and the former Ernestine Wellington Sidney (a daughter of Sophia Sidney, Baroness De L'Isle and Dudley, herself the eldest illegitimate daughter of William IV of the United Kingdom through his relationship with Dorothea Jordan).

== Career ==
Hunloke was a keen amateur cricketer and played minor counties cricket for Wiltshire on eleven occasions from 1926 to 1928.

Hunloke was elected as a Conservative Member of Parliament for West Derbyshire in 1938, resigning in 1944. He was awarded the Territorial Decoration.

== Personal life ==
On 28 November 1929, he married Lady Anne Cavendish at St Margaret's, Westminster. Lady Anne was the youngest daughter of Victor Cavendish, 9th Duke of Devonshire. Before their divorce in 1945 on the grounds of his adultery, they lived at Montagu Square, London, and had three children:

- Phillipa Victoria Hunloke (1930–2005), who married in 1955 (divorced in 1960) William Astor, 3rd Viscount Astor, a son of Waldorf Astor, 2nd Viscount Astor and Nancy Astor, Viscountess Astor.
- Timothy Henry Hunloke (b. 1932), an officer in the Grenadier Guards.
- Nicholas Victor Hunloke (b. 1939), married Lady Katherine Montagu, a daughter of Victor Montagu, 10th Earl of Sandwich.

After their divorce, his wife remarried to Christopher Holland-Martin MP, and, after his death, the 10th Earl of Sandwich (who was the father of their son's wife). He married again to Virginia Archer Clive, daughter of Percy Clive (a grandson of William Feilding, 7th Earl of Denbigh) and the former Alice Muriel Dallas, on 19 May 1945. They lived at St. Catherine's Lodge in Wokingham and Pendower House in Cornwall. They had two children before their divorce in 1972:

- Clare Hunloke (1947–1964), who died at age 17.
- Sarah Hunloke (b. 1949), who married Antonio Corrêa de Sá, son of José Corrêa de Sá, 2nd Viscount de São Luis.

He later made a third marriage, to Ruth Holdsworth, before he died in Marlborough, Wiltshire on 13 January 1978, aged 71.

Parliament of the United Kingdom
Preceded by Marquess of Hartington	Member of Parliament for West Derbyshire; 1938–1944	Succeeded by Charles Frederick White, Jr.
