= 1938 West Derbyshire by-election =

UK Parliamentary by-election

The 1938 West Derbyshire by-election was held on 2 June 1938. The by-election was held due to the succession to the peerage of the incumbent Conservative MP, Edward Cavendish. It was won by the Conservative candidate Henry Hunloke.

West Derbyshire by-election, 1938
Party	Candidate	Votes	%	±%
Conservative	Henry Hunloke	16,740	48.6	N/A
Labour	Charles Frederick White	11,216	32.5	New
Liberal	Milner Gray	6,515	18.9	New
Majority		5,524	16.1	N/A
Turnout		34,471	79.4	N/A
Conservative hold		Swing	N/A	
