= Lady Elizabeth Cavendish =

British noblewoman and courtier (1926–2018)

Lady Elizabeth Cavendish CVO
- Born: Lady Elizabeth Georgiana Alice Cavendish; 24 April 1926
- Died: 15 September 2018 (aged 92)
- Occupation: Lady-in-waiting to Princess Margaret, Countess of Snowdon
- Partner: John Betjeman
- Parent(s): Edward Cavendish, 10th Duke of Devonshire; Lady Mary Gascoyne-Cecil

Lady Elizabeth Georgiana Alice Cavendish CVO (24 April 1926 – 15 September 2018) was a British noblewoman who was a childhood friend of Queen Elizabeth II and a lady-in-waiting to Princess Margaret from the late 1940s until the latter's death in 2002.

Lady Elizabeth was the daughter of Edward Cavendish, 10th Duke of Devonshire, and his wife, the former Lady Mary Gascoyne-Cecil. She was born three days after Elizabeth (II), in 1926.

It has been suggested that Lady Elizabeth introduced her friend Princess Margaret to Antony Armstrong-Jones in 1951, and although she herself never married, she did form a close romantic relationship with the writer and future poet laureate John Betjeman that same year. Betjeman's daughter Candida Lycett Green had called her her father's "beloved other wife". Lady Elizabeth was one of the godparents of David Armstrong-Jones, 2nd Earl of Snowdon. By royal permission, Lady Elizabeth spoke on the record to Elizabeth II’s official biographer, Ben Pimlott.

When Betjeman died in Cornwall on 19 May 1984, Lady Elizabeth was at his side.

Cavendish was appointed Lieutenant of the Royal Victorian Order (LVO) in 1976 and Commander of the Royal Victorian Order (CVO) in 1997. Lady Elizabeth was a Justice of the Peace in Inner London for many years where she served as a chairman of both the juvenile and adult courts.

Cavendish died on 15 September 2018, at the age of 92.
