= Edward Cavendish, 10th Duke of Devonshire =

British politician (1895–1950)

His Grace The Duke of Devonshire KG MBE TD
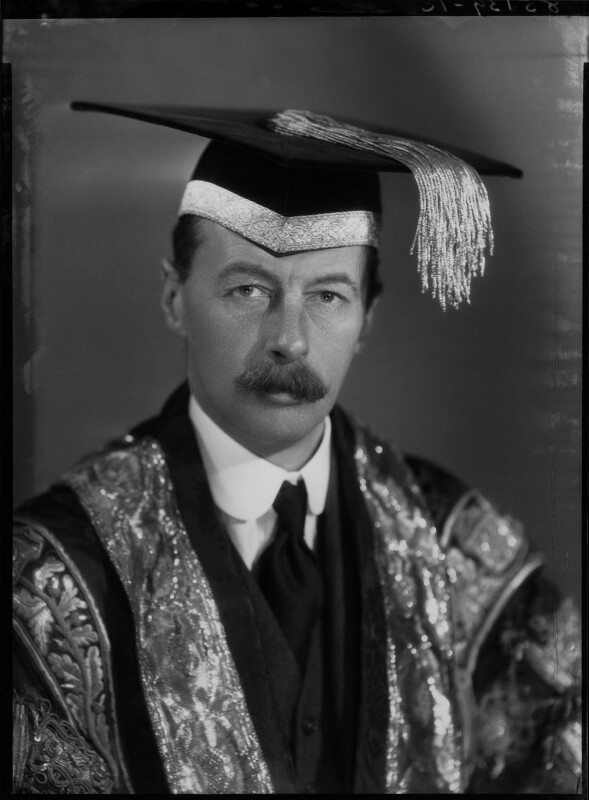
- Cavendish in 1938

Member of the House of Lords
- Lord Temporal
- In office 6 May 1938 – 26 November 1950
- Preceded by: The 9th Duke of Devonshire
- Succeeded by: The 11th Duke of Devonshire

Under-Secretary of State for Dominion Affairs
- In office 1936–1940
- Monarchs: Edward VIII; George VI
- Preceded by: Sir Douglas Hacking, Bt
- Succeeded by: Geoffrey Shakespeare

Under-Secretary of State for India and Burma
- In office 1940–1943
- Monarch: George VI
- Preceded by: Sir Hugh O'Neill, Bt
- Succeeded by: The Earl of Munster

Under-Secretary of State for the Colonies
- In office 1943–1945
- Monarch: George VI
- Preceded by: Harold Macmillan
- Succeeded by: Arthur Creech Jones

Personal details
- Born: Edward William Spencer Cavendish; 6 May 1895 Mayfair, London
- Died: 26 November 1950 (aged 55) Eastbourne
- Party: Conservative
- Spouse: Lady Mary Gascoyne-Cecil (m. 1917)
- Children: William Cavendish, Marquess of Hartington; Andrew Cavendish, 11th Duke of Devonshire; Lady Mary Cavendish; Lady Elizabeth Cavendish; Lady Anne Tree
- Parents: Victor Cavendish, 9th Duke of Devonshire; Lady Evelyn Petty-Fitzmaurice
- Education: Trinity College, Cambridge

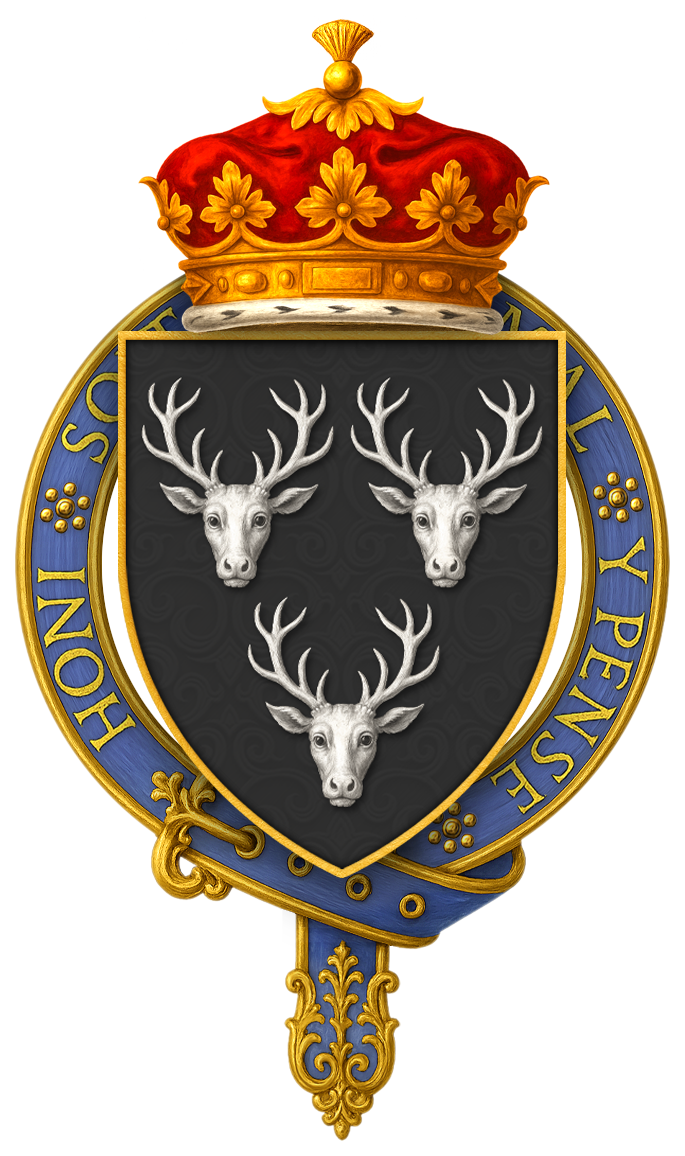
Garter-encircled shield of arms of Edward Cavendish, 10th Duke of Devonshire, KG, MBE, TD

Edward William Spencer Cavendish, 10th Duke of Devonshire (6 May 1895 – 26 November 1950), known as the Marquess of Hartington from 1908 to 1938, was a British politician. He was the head of the Devonshire branch of the House of Cavendish. He had careers with the army and in politics and was a senior freemason. His sudden death, apparently of a heart attack at the age of fifty-five, occurred in the presence of the physician and suspected serial killer John Bodkin Adams.

== Early life ==
Edward was born at 37, Park Lane, Mayfair, (Note: 37 Park Lane in Mayfair is now 117 Park Lane.) the son of Victor Cavendish and his wife, Lady Evelyn Petty-Fitzmaurice. In 1908, his father Victor succeeded as the 9th Duke of Devonshire, thus Edward was styled by the courtesy title Marquess of Hartington. Lord Hartington was educated at Eton College and Trinity College, Cambridge.

He was, after his father's death, the owner of Chatsworth House, and one of the largest private landowners in both Great Britain and Ireland.

== Military career ==
The then Marquess of Hartington began service with the Territorial Army as a second lieutenant in the Derbyshire Yeomanry in 1913.

Mobilised at the outbreak of the First World War, he was an aide-de-camp (ADC) on the Personal Staff at the British Expeditionary Force's General Headquarters. In 1916, when promoted captain, he rejoined his regiment, in Egypt, and served in the latter stages of the Dardanelles campaign. He then returned to France, became attached to Military Intelligence, then to the War Office and the British Military Mission in Paris, and was twice mentioned in despatches. In 1919, he served on the British peace delegation that attended the signing of the Treaty of Versailles and was appointed MBE. He also became a knight of the French Legion of Honour.

He continued serving after the war with his regiment, which became 24 (Derbyshire Yeomanry) Armoured Car Company of the Royal Tank Regiment in 1923. He was promoted major in 1932, and became lieutenant colonel in command in 1935. He was awarded the Territorial Decoration. He was also Honorary Colonel of the 6th Battalion of the Sherwood Foresters from 1917 to 1937, and of its successor, the 40th (Sherwood Foresters) Anti-Aircraft Battalion of the Royal Engineers.

== Political career ==
He unsuccessfully stood as a Conservative parliamentary candidate twice, in the 1918 general election for North East Derbyshire and in 1922 for West Derbyshire, before gaining the latter seat in 1923 and holding it until he succeeded to his father's peerage and entered the House of Lords in 1938. He was subsequently a minister in Winston Churchill's wartime government as a Parliamentary Under Secretary of State, for India and Burma (1940–1943) and for the Colonies (1943–1945).

He also served in Derbyshire local government. He was appointed a JP for the county in 1917, and a Deputy Lieutenant in 1936, ultimately becoming the county's Lord Lieutenant from 1938 until his death. He also served as Mayor of Buxton in 1920–1921.

== Other civil posts ==
He was chairman of the Overseas Settlement Board in 1936 and was High Steward of the University of Cambridge and Chancellor of the University of Leeds from 1938 until 1950. He also had company directorships with The Alliance Insurance Company of Britain and the Bank of Australasia. He served as president of the Zoological Society of London in 1948.

He was a freemason and was Grand Master of the United Grand Lodge of England from 1947 to 1950.

== Marriage and children ==
In 1917, he married Lady Mary Gascoyne-Cecil, granddaughter of Prime Minister Robert Gascoyne-Cecil, 3rd Marquess of Salisbury. They had five children:

- William John Robert Cavendish, Marquess of Hartington (10 December 1917 – 10 September 1944), married Kathleen Kennedy, sister of John F. Kennedy; killed in action in World War II
- Andrew Robert Buxton Cavendish, 11th Duke of Devonshire (2 January 1920 – 3 May 2004), married the Hon. Deborah Freeman-Mitford, youngest daughter of David Freeman-Mitford, 2nd Baron Redesdale
- Lady Mary Cavendish (6 November 1922 – 17 November 1922)
- Lady Elizabeth Georgiana Alice Cavendish (24 April 1926 – 15 September 2018)
- Lady Anne Evelyn Beatrice Cavendish (6 November 1927 – 9 August 2010), a prison visitor; married Michael Lambert Tree

The Duke's sister Dorothy was married to Prime Minister Harold Macmillan. The Duke's younger brother Charles was married to American dancer Adele Astaire, sister of Fred Astaire.

== Death ==
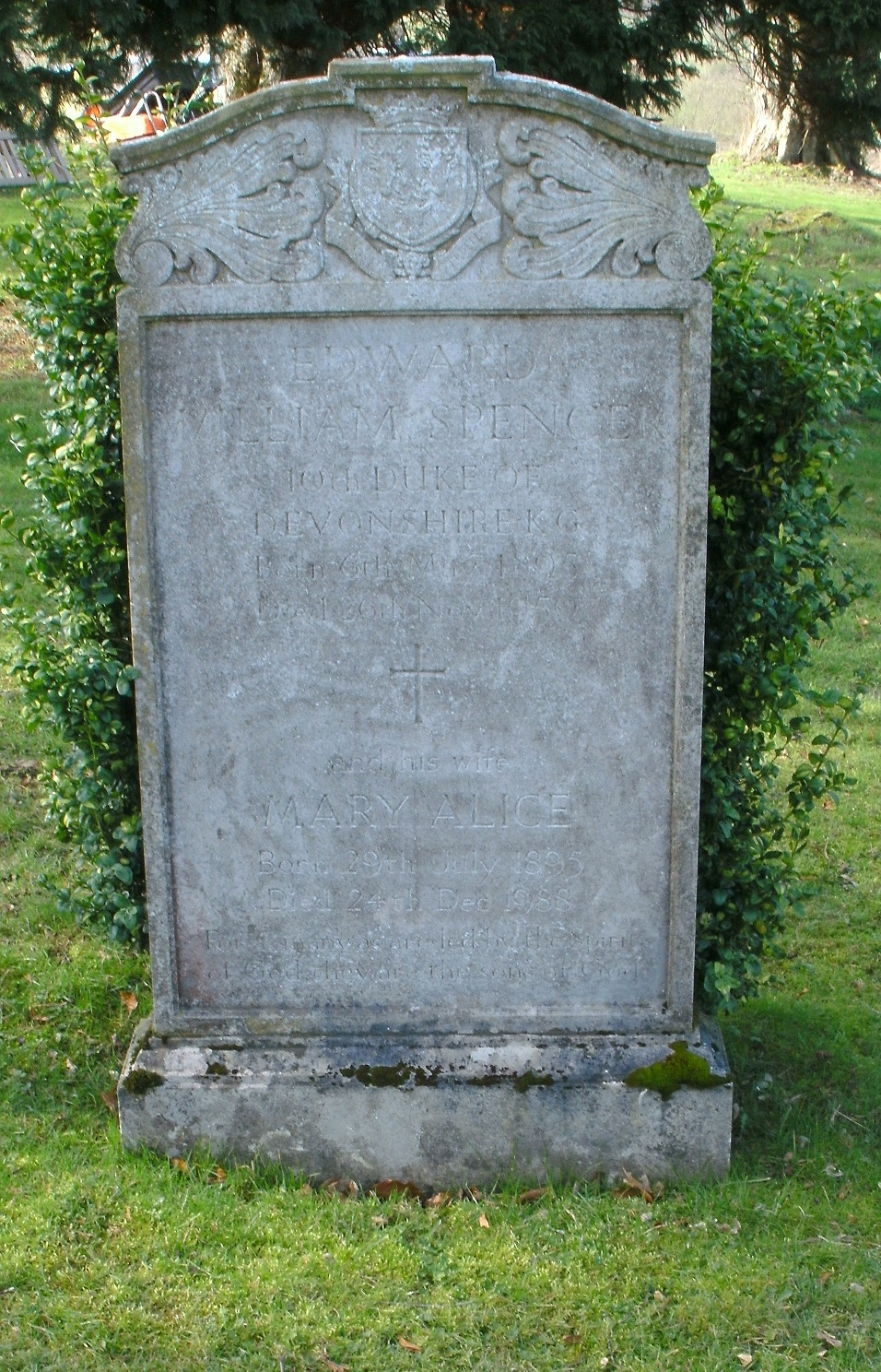
St Peter's Churchyard, Edensor - grave of Edward, 10th Duke of Devonshire, KG, MBE, TD (1895–1950)

On 26 November 1950, he suffered a heart attack and died at his home Compton Place, Eastbourne, in the presence of his general practitioner, John Bodkin Adams, the suspected serial killer. Despite the fact that the duke had not seen a doctor in the 14 days before his death, the coroner was not notified as he should have been. Adams signed the death certificate stating that the Duke died of natural causes.

Thirteen days earlier, Edith Alice Morrell – another patient of Adams – had also died. Historian Pamela Cullen speculates that as the Duke was the head of British freemasonry, Adams – a member of the fundamentalist Plymouth Brethren – would have been motivated to withhold the necessary vital treatment, since the "Grandmaster of England would have been seen by some of the Plymouth Brethren as Satan incarnate". No proper police investigation was ever conducted into the death, but the duke's son, Andrew, later said "it should perhaps be noted that this doctor was not appointed to look after the health of my two younger sisters, who were then in their teens"; Adams had a reputation for grooming older patients in order to extract bequests.

Adams was tried in 1957 for Morrell's murder but controversially acquitted. The prosecutor was Attorney-General Sir Reginald Manningham-Buller, a distant cousin of the Duke (via their shared ancestor, George Cavendish). Cullen has questioned why Manningham-Buller failed to question Adams regarding the Duke's death, and suggests that he was wary of drawing attention to Prime Minister Harold Macmillan (the Duke's brother-in-law) and specifically to his wife who was having an extramarital affair with Robert Boothby at the time.

Home Office pathologist Francis Camps linked Adams to 163 suspicious deaths in total, which would make him a precursor to Harold Shipman.

The Duke's body was buried in the churchyard at Edensor, Derbyshire, near Chatsworth.

== Estate ==
In 1946 the Duke transferred most of his assets to his only surviving son in an attempt to avoid a repeat of the heavy death duties which the 9th Duke had had to pay in 1908. The Duke's surprise death less than four years later meant that his estate had to pay 80% death duties on the value of the entire estate. Had he lived longer, the value assessed to tax would have been progressively reduced to zero. The tax liability led to the transfer of Hardwick Hall to the National Trust, and the sale of many of the Devonshires' accumulated assets, including tens of thousands of acres of land, and many works of art and rare books. Whilst the majority of the Duke's property transferred to the next Duke, his private funds of £796,473 8s. 9d. were willed to his widow Mary Alice, Dowager Duchess of Devonshire.

== Arms ==
Coat of arms of Edward Cavendish, 10th Duke of Devonshire
Crest A serpent nowed proper. Escutcheon Sable three stags' heads caboshed argent. Supporters Two bucks proper, each wreathed round the neck with a chaplet of roses, alternately argent and azure. Motto Cavendo tutus (Secure by caution). Orders The Most Noble Order of the Garter - Knight Companion (KG).

== See also ==
- Gertrude Hullett

== Notes ==
Parliament of the United Kingdom
Preceded by Charles Frederick White	Member of Parliament for West Derbyshire; 1923–1938	Succeeded by Henry Hunloke
Political offices
Preceded by Sir Douglas Hacking, Bt	Under-Secretary of State for Dominion Affairs; 1936–1940	Succeeded by Geoffrey Shakespeare
Preceded by Sir Hugh O'Neill, Bt	Under-Secretary of State for India and Burma; 1940–1943	Succeeded by The Earl of Munster
Preceded by Harold Macmillan	Under-Secretary of State for the Colonies; 1943–1945	Succeeded by Arthur Creech Jones
Honorary titles
Preceded by Victor Cavendish, 9th Duke of Devonshire	Lord Lieutenant of Derbyshire; 1938–1950	Succeeded by Sir Ian Walker-Okeover, Bt
Masonic offices
Preceded by Henry Lascelles, 6th Earl of Harewood	Grand Master of the United Grand Lodge of England; 1947–1950	Succeeded by Roger Lumley, 11th Earl of Scarbrough
Academic offices
Preceded by Victor Cavendish, 9th Duke of Devonshire	Chancellor of the University of Leeds; 1938–1950	Succeeded by Mary, Princess Royal
Peerage of England
Preceded by Victor Cavendish	Duke of Devonshire; 1938–1950; Member of the House of Lords (1938–1950)	Succeeded by Andrew Cavendish
Preceded by Victor Cavendish	Earl of Devonshire; 1938–1950	Succeeded by Andrew Cavendish
Preceded by Victor Cavendish	Baron Cavendish; 1938–1950	Succeeded by Andrew Cavendish
Peerage of the United Kingdom
Preceded by Victor Cavendish	Earl of Burlington; 1938–1950	Succeeded by Andrew Cavendish
Preceded by Victor Cavendish	Baron Cavendish of Keighley; 1938–1950	Succeeded by Andrew Cavendish
