= Andrew Cavendish, 11th Duke of Devonshire =

British politician and duke (1920–2004)

His Grace The Duke of Devonshire KG MC PC DL
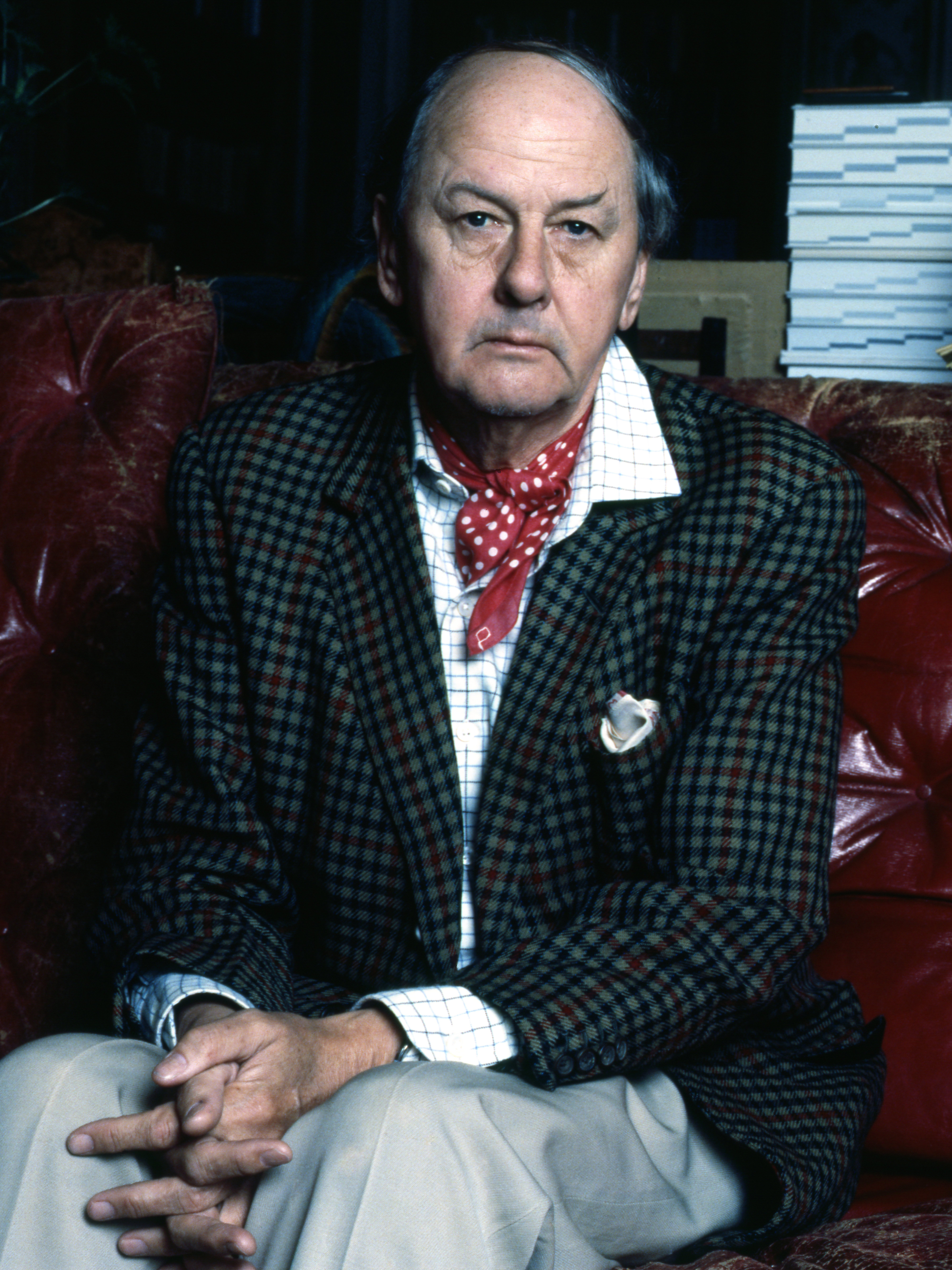
- Portrait by Allan Warren

Minister of State for Commonwealth Relations
- In office 6 September 1962 – 16 October 1964
- Prime Minister: Harold Macmillan; Alec Douglas-Home
- Preceded by: The Lord Alport
- Succeeded by: Cledwyn Hughes

Parliamentary Under-Secretary of State for Commonwealth Relations
- In office 28 October 1960 – 6 September 1962
- Prime Minister: Harold Macmillan
- Preceded by: Richard Thompson
- Succeeded by: John Tilney

Member of the House of Lords
- Lord Temporal
- In office 26 November 1950 – 11 November 1999 as a hereditary peer
- Preceded by: The 10th Duke of Devonshire
- Succeeded by: Seat abolished (Note: Pursuant to the House of Lords Act 1999.)

Personal details
- Born: Andrew Robert Buxton Cavendish; 2 January 1920 London, England
- Died: 3 May 2004 (aged 84) Chatsworth, Derbyshire
- Party: National Liberal (1940s); Conservative (1950–1982); SDP (1982–1988) 'Continuing' SDP (1988–1990); None (1990–2001); UKIP (2001–2004)
- Spouse: Deborah Mitford (m. 1941)
- Children: 7, including Peregrine Cavendish, 12th Duke of Devonshire, and Lady Sophia Topley
- Parent(s): Edward Cavendish, 10th Duke of Devonshire; Lady Mary Gascoyne-Cecil
- Education: Trinity College, Cambridge

Andrew Robert Buxton Cavendish, 11th Duke of Devonshire (2 January 1920 – 3 May 2004), styled Lord Andrew Cavendish until 1944 and Marquess of Hartington from 1944 to 1950, was a British peer and politician. He was a minister in the government of Prime Minister Harold Macmillan (his uncle by marriage), and is also known for opening Chatsworth House to the public.

== Early life ==
Cavendish was the second son of Edward Cavendish, 10th Duke of Devonshire, and Mary Cavendish, Duchess of Devonshire, the former Lady Mary Alice Gascoyne-Cecil, daughter of James Gascoyne-Cecil, 4th Marquess of Salisbury. He was educated at Ludgrove School, Eton College and Trinity College, Cambridge. Growing up, his elder brother, William Cavendish, Marquess of Hartington, was the heir apparent to the dukedom.

== Career ==
=== Military service ===
Cavendish served in the British Army during World War II. Having attended an Officer Cadet Training Unit, he was commissioned into the Coldstream Guards as a second lieutenant on 2 November 1940. On 7 December 1944, while holding the rank of acting captain, he was awarded the Military Cross 'in recognition of gallant and distinguished services in Italy'. The action took place on 27 July 1944 when his company was cut off for 36 hours in heavy combat near Strada, Italy. He held the rank of major at the end of the war.

In later life, he took on a number of honorary positions within the military. On 2 December 1953, he was appointed Honorary Colonel of a Territorial Army unit of the Royal Regiment of Artillery. On 2 October 1981, he was appointed Honorary Colonel of the Manchester and Salford Universities Officers' Training Corps. He relinquished this appointment on 2 January 1985.

=== Political career ===
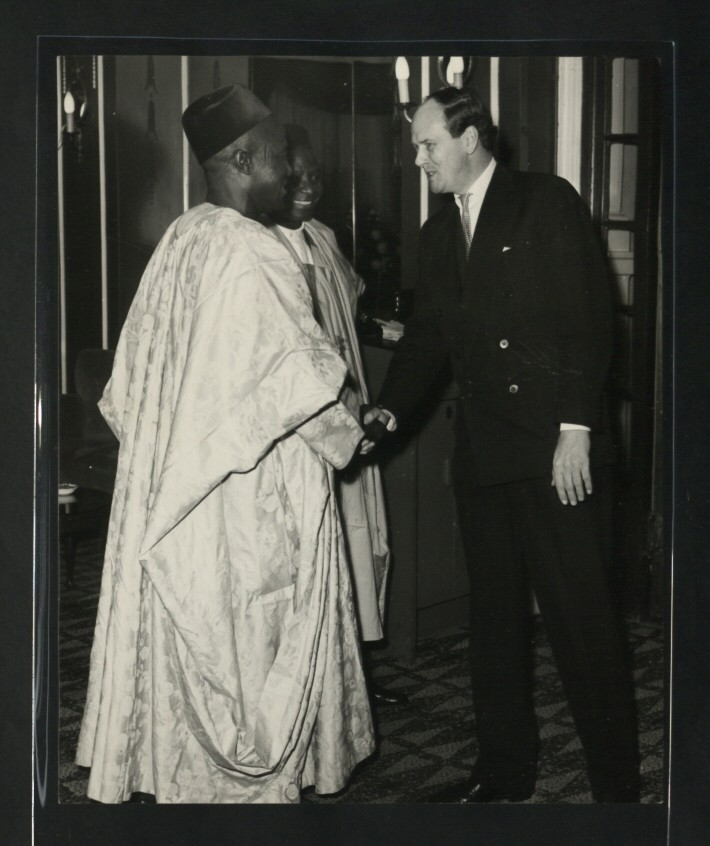
The 11th Duke of Devonshire at a reception given by the Agent-General for Northern Nigeria in the early 1960s

Cavendish, now styled as Marquess of Hartington, ran unsuccessfully as a National Liberal candidate for Chesterfield in the 1945 general election and as a Conservative for the same seat in 1950. He succeeded as 11th Duke of Devonshire in November 1950, and served as Mayor of Buxton from 1952 to 1954. Devonshire served as Parliamentary Under-Secretary for Commonwealth Relations from 1960 to 1962, Minister of State at the Commonwealth Relations Office from 1962 to 1963, and for Colonial Affairs from 1963 to 1964. He once said that these appointments by his uncle, Harold Macmillan, the then-prime minister, were "the greatest act of nepotism ever".

He joined the Social Democratic Party (SDP) in early 1982, having contacted the party's leader Roy Jenkins directly to offer his support soon after the Warrington by-election the previous summer. Latterly a supporter of David Owen – whom he later described as "the best of them" – Devonshire chose to remain with the rump 'continuing' SDP after the majority of the party's members voted to merge with the Liberal Party in 1988. He later sat as a crossbencher during his rare appearances in the House of Lords.

=== Other pursuits ===
The duke followed the family tradition of owning racehorses, the most famous of which was Park Top, the subject of the duke's first published book, A Romance of The Turf: Park Top, which was published in 1976. His autobiography, Accidents of Fortune, was published just before his death in 2004. The duke had many disputes over the years with the ramblers who used the paths near Chatsworth. Eventually though, in 1991, he signed an agreement with the Peak National Park Authority opening 1,300 acres (5 km^{2}) of his estate to walkers. He said that everyone was "welcome in my back garden". The duke's real estate holdings were vast. In addition to Chatsworth he also owned Lismore Castle in Ireland and Bolton Abbey in North Yorkshire. He also owned the bookshop Heywood Hill and the gentleman's club Pratt's.

Devonshire was a major collector of contemporary British art, known especially for his patronage of Lucian Freud. He was one of the founders, and the chief patron of, the Next Century Foundation, in which capacity he hosted the private Chatsworth talks between representatives of the governments of the Arab world and Israel. The duke was listed at number 73 in the Sunday Times Rich List of the richest people in Great Britain in 2004.

== Family ==
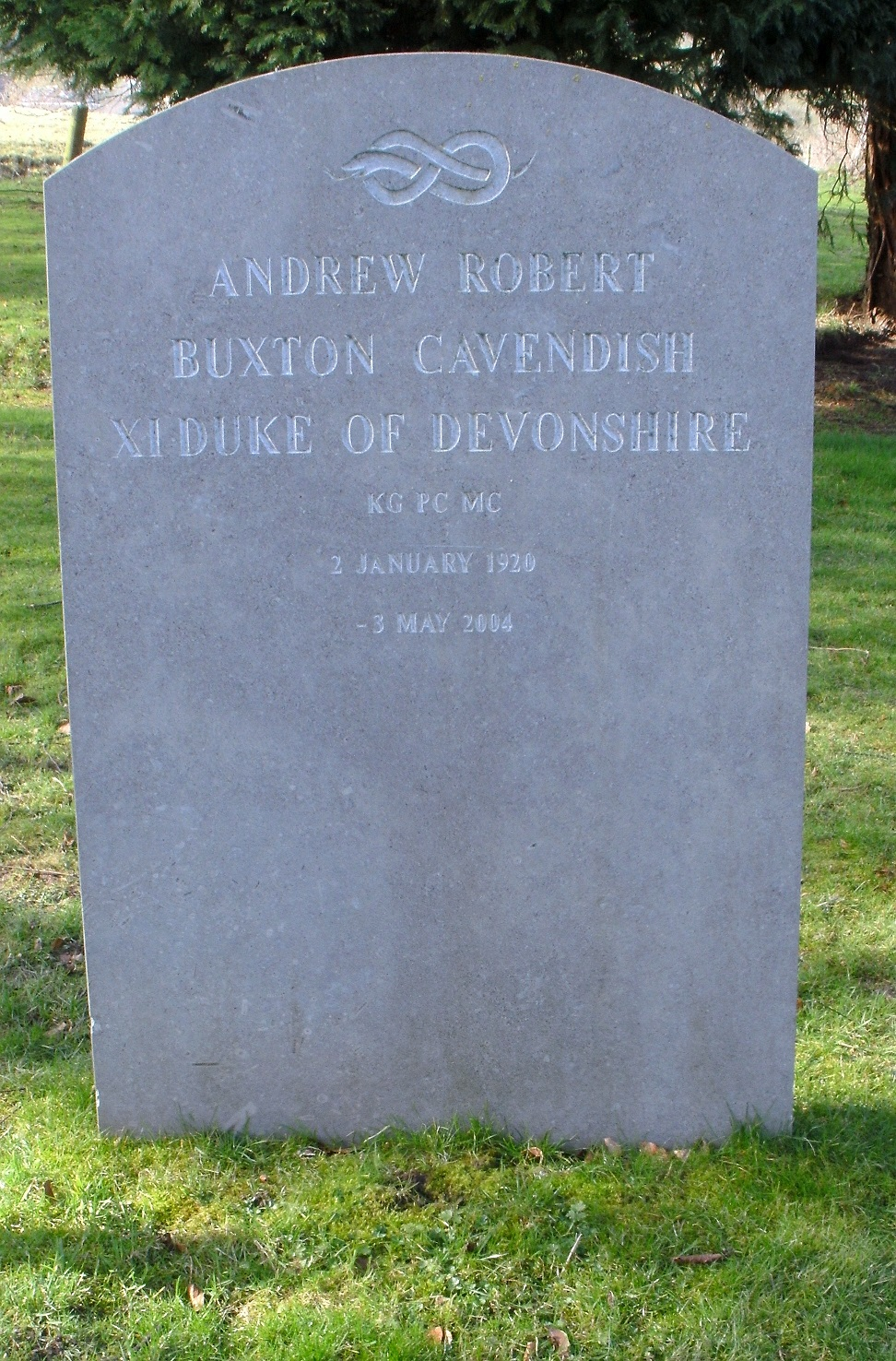
St Peter's Churchyard, Edensor – grave of Andrew Cavendish, 11th Duke of Devonshire KG, MC, PC, DL (1920–2004)

=== Marriage and children ===
In 1941, the then Lord Andrew Cavendish married The Honourable Deborah Freeman-Mitford (31 March 1920 – 24 September 2014), youngest daughter of David Freeman-Mitford, 2nd Baron Redesdale, and one of the Mitford sisters, in the Priory Church of St Bartholomew-the-Great, Smithfield, London.

Devonshire and his wife had seven children, four of whom died in utero or in infancy. The three surviving children were a son, Peregrine Cavendish, 12th Duke of Devonshire, and two daughters, Lady Emma Cavendish and Lady Sophia Topley.

- Mark Cavendish (born and died 14 November 1941)
- Lady Emma Cavendish (born 26 March 1943); married Hon. Tobias Tennant, son of Christopher Tennant, 2nd Baron Glenconner, on 3 September 1963. They have three children (including Stella Tennant) and ten grandchildren
- Peregrine Cavendish, 12th Duke of Devonshire (born 27 April 1944); married Amanda Heywood-Lonsdale on 28 June 1967. They have four children and eight grandchildren.
- Lord Victor Cavendish (born and died 22 May 1947)
- Lady Mary Alice Cavendish (born and died 5 April 1953)
- Lady Sophia Cavendish (born 18 March 1957); married Anthony Murphy on 20 October 1979 and they were divorced in 1987. She married Alastair Morrison, 3rd Baron Margadale, on 19 July 1988 and they were later divorced. They have two children: Hon. Declean Morrison (born 1993) and Hon. Nancy Morrison (born 1995). She married William Topley on 25 November 1999.

In December 1946, the Duchess had a miscarriage; had the child been born, it would have been a twin of Victor Cavendish, born in 1947.

The Duke's extramarital affairs became public after he appeared as a witness at a burglary trial and was forced to admit, under oath, that he was on holiday with one of a series of younger women when the crime occurred at his London home. The Duke, however, claimed that much of his marriage's success was due to the Duchess's tolerance and broadmindedness. The Duchess, as châtelaine, was largely responsible for the success of Chatsworth as a commercial endeavour.

=== Inheritance ===
Devonshire's older brother William, Marquess of Hartington, who would have inherited the dukedom, was killed in combat near the end of the Second World War. With William's death, Andrew became heir and received the courtesy title of Marquess of Hartington, by which he was known from September 1944 until November 1950.

Devonshire's uncle, Lord Charles Cavendish, died aged 38 as a result of alcoholism. Lord Charles's will bequeathed Lismore Castle to Andrew upon the remarriage of Charles's wife, Adele Astaire, in 1947.

The 10th Duke died of a heart attack while visiting Eastbourne in November 1950 and Andrew, who was in Australia at the time, inherited the title. The Duke died while being attended by suspected serial killer John Bodkin Adams, who was his doctor when visiting Eastbourne. No proper police investigation was ever conducted into the death, but Devonshire later said "it should perhaps be noted that this doctor was not appointed to look after the health of my two younger sisters, who were then in their teens"; Adams had a reputation for grooming older patients to extract bequests.

Devonshire inherited the estate but also an inheritance tax bill of £7 million (£207 million in 2025), nearly 80 per cent of the value of the estate. To meet this, the Duke had to sell off many art objects and antiques, including works by Rembrandt, Van Dyck, as well as thousands of acres of land.

The Duke is buried in the churchyard of St Peter's Church, Edensor – in the grounds of Chatsworth.

== Honours ==
In 1996, he was made a Knight Companion of the Garter. He was elected to the American Philosophical Society later that year.

On 10 December 1955, he was made a Grand Cross of the Order of Christ by the Portuguese government.

== Coat of arms ==
Coat of arms of Andrew Cavendish, 11th Duke of Devonshire, KG, MC, PC, DL
Coronet Coronet of a Duke Crest A serpent nowed Vert. Escutcheon Sable three stags' heads cabossed Argent. Supporters Two hinds proper each gorged with a chaplet of roses Argent and Azure alternately barbed Or seeded Vert. Motto CAVENDO TUTUS (Safe through Caution) Orders Order of the Garter Other versions Full achievement of arms: .

== Other ==
The 11^{th} Duke was one of the notables interviewed in the four-part 1997 BBC-Two documentary, “The Aristocracy,” that traced the decline and transformation of the British aristocracy from the late 19th century to the late 20th century. The series also covered the Duke’s development of Chatsworth House as a tourist attraction and a holiday party for the children of the estate.

He once told an interviewer:

"Wonderful things have happened in my life — it's time my son had his turn. When I was young I used to like casinos, fast women and God knows what. Now my idea of Heaven, apart from being at Chatsworth, is to sit in the hall of Brooks's, having tea."

== Bibliography ==
- (writing as The Duke of Devonshire): A Romance of the Turf: Park Top (2000 edition) ISBN 0-7195-5482-9
- (writing as Andrew Devonshire): Accidents of Fortune [Autobiography] (2004) ISBN 0-85955-286-1

== Notes ==
Political offices
Preceded by Richard Thompson	Under-Secretary of State for Commonwealth Relations; 1960–1962; With: Bernard Braine 1961–1962; John Tilney 1962	Succeeded by John Tilney
Preceded by Cuthbert Alport	Minister of State for Commonwealth Relations; 1962–1964	Succeeded by Cledwyn Hughes
Peerage of England
Preceded by Edward Cavendish	Duke of Devonshire; 1950–2004; Member of the House of Lords (1950–2004)	Succeeded by Peregrine Cavendish
Preceded by Edward Cavendish	Earl of Devonshire; 1950–2004	Succeeded by Peregrine Cavendish
Preceded by Edward Cavendish	Baron Cavendish of Hardwick; 1950–2004	Succeeded by Peregrine Cavendish
Peerage of the United Kingdom
Preceded by Edward Cavendish	Earl of Burlington; 1950–2004	Succeeded by Peregrine Cavendish
