= Charles Frederick White =

British politician

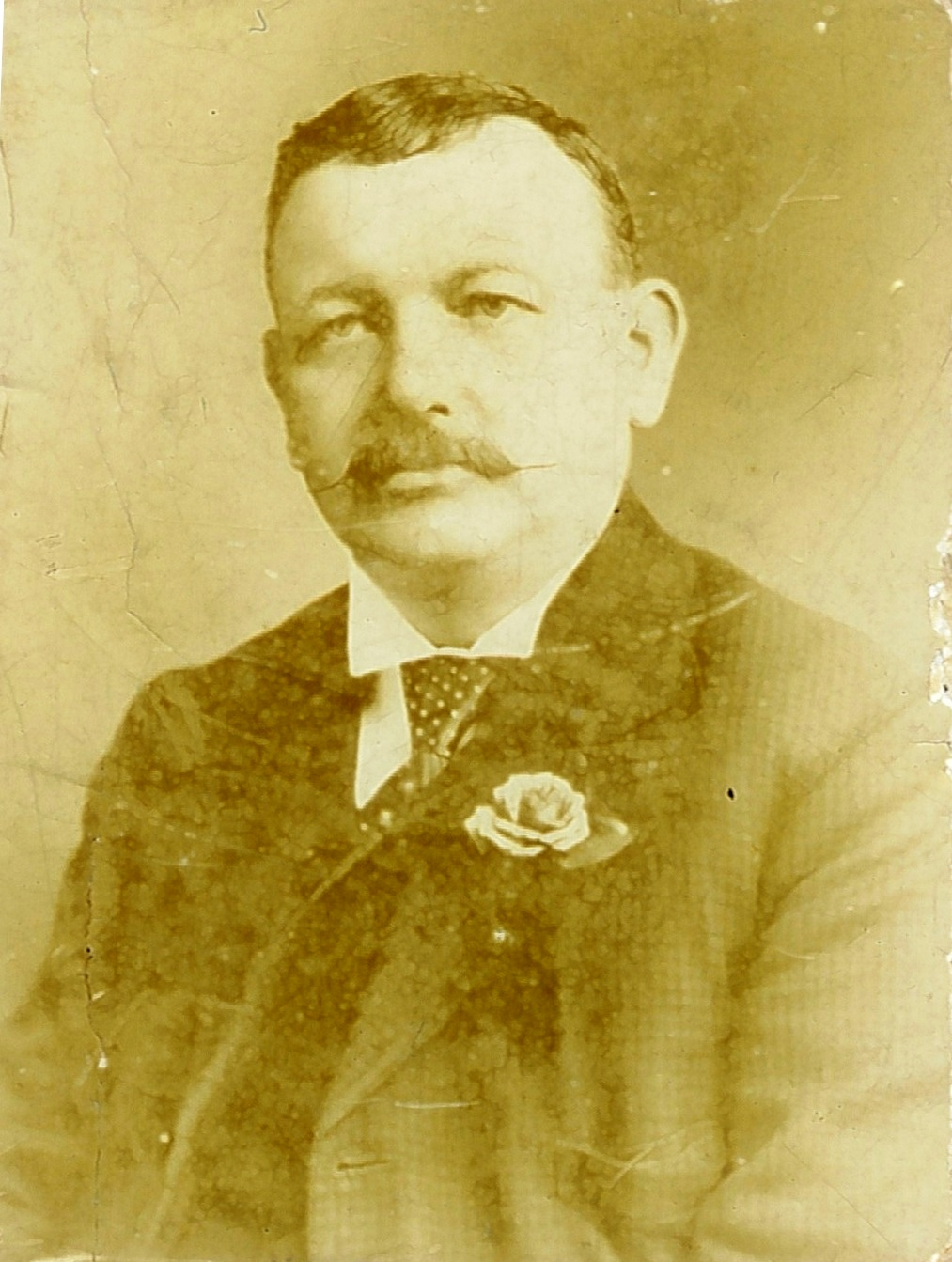
- White in 1909

Member of Parliament for West Derbyshire
- In office 14 December 1918 – 16 November 1923
- Preceded by: Earl of Kerry
- Succeeded by: Marquess of Hartington

Personal details
- Born: 11 March 1863 Tetbury, Gloucestershire, England
- Died: 4 December 1923 (aged 60)
- Party: Liberal
- Spouse: Alice Charlesworth (m. 1881)
- Children: 6

Charles Frederick White (11 March 1863 – 4 December 1923) was an English boot and shoemaker and Liberal Party politician. He was Member of Parliament (MP) for the Western Division of Derbyshire from 1918 to 1923.

== Family and education ==
White was born in Tetbury in Gloucestershire in 1863, the son of Frederick and Ruth White. He was educated privately in Tetbury. In 1881 he married Alice Charlesworth of Bonsall, Derbyshire. They had one son and five daughters. White's son, also called Charles Frederick (1891–1956), inherited his father's political activism, although in the Labour rather than the Liberal interest.

== Career ==
White was originally a boot and shoemaker and dealer by trade but he gave this up to go into politics full-time by becoming a registration and political agent for the Liberal Party in the West Derbyshire area. He also acted as agent for Barnet Kenyon, the Derbyshire Miners' Association candidate at Chesterfield.

== Politics ==
=== Local politics ===
As well as working as a political agent for the Liberal Party, White also went into local government politics. From 1898 to at least 1903 he was a member of Bonsall Urban District Council, while by 1913 he was chairman of the Matlock Bath Urban District Council. He was for four years an elected member of Derbyshire County Council and held the position of magistrate by virtue of being Chairman of a Local Authority.

=== 1910 ===
White contested the West Derbyshire constituency at the general election of December 1910. The West Derbyshire seat and surrounding area had been a family heirloom of the local aristocrats the Cavendish family since the 16th century. Since the modern seat was created in 1885 it had been held solely by members of the Cavendish family. The sitting MP in 1910 was the Earl of Kerry. He had inherited the seat at a by-election in 1908 when he was returned unopposed as a Liberal Unionist. Kerry held the seat against Liberal opposition in January 1910 and then defeated White in December 1910 with a majority of 1,060 votes.

=== 1918 ===
Charles White

In 1918 however, the world turned upside down. Despite the Earl of Kerry's receiving the Coalition coupon which surely ought to have ensured his victory in such a safe Tory seat, he lost to White by a majority of 2,160 votes.

=== 1922–1923 ===
At the 1922 general election, White faced a new Unionist opponent but another member of the Cavendish family, the Marquess of Hartington. In a tight contest White just managed to retain his seat, albeit by the narrow margin of 87 votes – just 0.4% of the total votes cast. White was intending to defend his seat again at the 1923 general election and he was duly nominated as a candidate but he died just before the election took place.

== Death ==
White died of pneumonia on the morning of 4 December 1923, aged 60 years, having been taken ill after a meeting a few days before. His death meant that the election contest in West Derbyshire had to be postponed until 20 December 1923, all other polling having taken place on 6 December. The seat reverted to being the property of the Cavendish family when the Marquess of Hartington gained the seat at the expense of the new Liberal candidate W C Mallison.

Parliament of the United Kingdom
Preceded by The Earl of Kerry	Member of Parliament for Western Division of Derbyshire; 1918 – 1923	Succeeded by the Marquess of Hartington
