= William Cavendish, Marquess of Hartington =

British politician and soldier (1917–1944)

Major Marquess of Hartington

Personal details
- Born: William John Robert Cavendish; 10 December 1917 London, England
- Died: 9 September 1944 (aged 26) Heppen, Belgium
- Cause of death: Killed in action
- Party: Conservative
- Spouse: Kathleen Agnes Kennedy (m. 1944)
- Parents: Edward Cavendish, 10th Duke of Devonshire; Mary Gascoyne-Cecil
- Relatives: Andrew Cavendish, 11th Duke of Devonshire (brother)
- Education: Trinity College, Cambridge

Military service
- Branch/service: British Army
- Rank: Major
- Unit: Coldstream Guards, Guards Armoured Division
- Battles/wars: Second World War: Western Front †

William John Robert Cavendish, Marquess of Hartington (10 December 1917 – 9 September 1944), was a British politician and British Army officer. He was the elder son of Edward Cavendish, 10th Duke of Devonshire, and therefore the heir to the dukedom. He was killed in action in the Second World War during fighting in the Low Countries in September 1944 whilst leading a company of the Coldstream Guards.

== Early life ==
Lord Hartington was born on 10 December 1917 in London, England. He was the elder son of Edward Cavendish, 10th Duke of Devonshire, and his wife, Lady Mary Gascoyne-Cecil. He was educated at Eton and Trinity College, Cambridge.

He was a member of the Conservative Party, and was selected as the official candidate of the Wartime Coalition for the West Derbyshire by-election on 18 February 1944, in the constituency local to Chatsworth. He was faced by Charles Frederick White Jr., who resigned from the Labour Party to run as an Independent candidate, evading the Wartime Coalition's ban on partisan campaigning. West Derbyshire had been held by Conservatives since 1923 (Hartington's father and then his uncle by marriage). In a contentious campaign, White solidly defeated Hartington with 57.7% of the vote to 41.5%.

== Second World War and death ==
He received a commission as an officer into the British Army's Coldstream Guards regiment during the Second World War. In August 1944, during the liberation of Europe in the West from Nazi Germany, Hartington's unit, the 5th Battalion Coldstream Guards, as a part of the Guards Armoured Division, was engaged in heavy fighting in France. In early September 1944, it crossed the River Somme and pushed eastward towards Brussels, where it was one of the first to liberate the city. Of the townsfolk and villagers who turned out and cheered the Allies and, in some cases, decorated their tanks, Hartington wrote to his wife of feeling "so unworthy of it all living as I have in reasonable safety and comfort during these years..... I have a permanent lump in my throat and long for you to be here as it is an experience which few can have and which I would love to share with you."

On 9 September 1944, Hartington was shot dead at the age of 26 by a sniper whilst leading a company trying to capture the town of Heppen in Belgium from troops of the Waffen-SS. He is buried at the Leopoldsburg War Cemetery.

== Personal life ==
He married American socialite Kathleen Kennedy on 6 May 1944 at the Register Office in Chelsea Town Hall on King's Road in London. She was the daughter of former U.S. Ambassador to the United Kingdom Joseph P. Kennedy Sr., and the sister of John, Robert, and Ted Kennedy. The Duke of Devonshire and the bride's eldest brother Joseph P. Kennedy Jr., then a lieutenant in the United States Navy, signed the marriage register, and the Duke of Rutland served as best man. Her mother, Rose, disapproved of the union because the Kennedy family were Catholic and the Dukes of Devonshire were Anglican, and neither would be married in the other's faith.
