= Charles Frederick White (Labour politician) =

English politician

Member of Parliament for West Derbyshire
- In office 17 February 1944 – 3 February 1950
- Preceded by: Henry Hunloke
- Succeeded by: Edward Wakefield

Personal details
- Born: 23 January 1891 Bonsall, Derbyshire,
- Died: 27 November 1956 (aged 65) Matlock, Derbyshire, England
- Party: Labour
- Parent: Charles Frederick White (father)

Charles Frederick White CBE (23 January 1891 – 27 November 1956) was a Labour Party politician in the United Kingdom. He was Member of Parliament (MP) for the West Derbyshire firstly from 1944 to 1945 as an Independent Labour candidate and subsequently from 1945 to 1950 as the official Labour Party candidate. He was the son of Charles Frederick White, who had represented the same constituency for the Liberal Party from 1918 to 1923.

== Family and education ==
White was born in Bonsall in Derbyshire in 1891, the only son of Charles Frederick White and Alice Charlesworth, and had five sisters. In 1915 he married Alice Moore.

His father has been politically active on behalf of the Liberals and had successfully broken the dynastic Conservative stranglehold on the Western Division of Derbyshire parliamentary seat by the Cavendish family from 1918 to his death in 1923 when the constituency returned to the Conservative fold.

== Career ==
=== Registration agent and soldier ===
White worked as a registration agent for his father during his unsuccessful campaign as a Liberal candidate for West Derbyshire in the 1910 General Election.

At the onset of the First World War, he joined the 6th Notts and Derbyshire Battalion of the Territorial Force, a reserve formation of the British Army, in October 1914, gaining promotion to Corporal in November of the same year, and to Sergeant in March 1915, serving in the UK until his discharge from active service in 1917.

Following the war, White again worked as his father's election agent in his successful defence of the West Derbyshire seat in 1922 and during the 1923 campaign for the same seat, which was ended by his father's death.

=== Local politics ===
White inherited his father's political activism and joined the Liberal Party. White's first political post was as a Councillor, being elected to Derbyshire County Council in 1928. In the following year he was elected to Matlock Urban District Council. At the 1929 General Election he stood as Liberal candidate for Hanley, finishing third.

In 1930 White resigned from the Liberal party, and joined Oswald Mosley's New Party for three months soon after it was established, thinking it would be a radical left-wing organisation. In common with many other early supporters, he left as soon as the fascist character of the movement became clear, but this was to become a point of contention during his later political career.

White subsequently joined the Labour party, continuing his municipal activities in the meantime, and he was selected as the Labour prospective parliamentary candidate for West Derbyshire in 1937.

=== National politics ===
==== 1938 ====
In 1938, White stood unsuccessfully as the Labour candidate in a parliamentary by-election for the West Derbyshire constituency, coming second to the Conservative candidate, Henry Philip Hunloke.

==== 1944 ====
In 1944, despite being the official Labour prospective parliamentary candidate at the time the by-election was announced, White broke the convention that existed between the major parties in the UK during the Second World War that by-elections were unopposed and stood as an Independent Labour candidate against the Conservative candidate William Cavendish in the by-election for the West Derbyshire constituency caused by the resignation of the Conservative incumbent. In an acrimonious campaign White pressed for social change, securing the support of local Labour activists, and won with a remarkable swing, polling over four thousand votes more than the second-placed Conservative candidate. Once in Parliament he took the official Labour party whip.

==== 1945-1950 ====
By 1945, White had been reconciled with the official Labour party and stood as the party's candidate in that year's general election. He again won, but by a drastically reduced majority of just 156 votes over his Conservative opponent, William Aitken. White served as the constituency MP until the 1950 general election when he stood down, and the seat reverted to a Conservative MP, Edward Wakefield.

During his time in Parliament, White's limited contributions to debate focused mostly on agricultural and labour issues together with electoral reform. Whilst serving as an MP, White also became Chair of Derbyshire County Council in 1946, a post he held for the next decade.

=== Post 1950 ===
Following his departure from Parliament, White remained active in local and regional politics. As well as being chair of the County Council, in 1951 he was a member of the East Midlands Transport Users Consultative Committee, and was the first chair of the Peak District National Park Board.

== Death ==
White died at Chesterfield Royal Hospital in 1956.

== Recognition ==
White was appointed a CBE in the New Year's Honours list of 1951 in recognition of his political and public works.

In 1956, a secondary school in Matlock was named the Charles White Secondary Modern in recognition of both father & son's contributions to the local area. The school was later merged with another to form the extant Highfields school.

Parliament of the United Kingdom
Preceded by Henry Hunloke	Member of Parliament for Western Division of Derbyshire; 1944 – 1950	Succeeded by Edward Wakefield
