= Victor Cavendish, 9th Duke of Devonshire =

British politician (1868–1938)

Major His Grace The Duke of Devonshire KG GCMG GCVO TD PC JP FRS
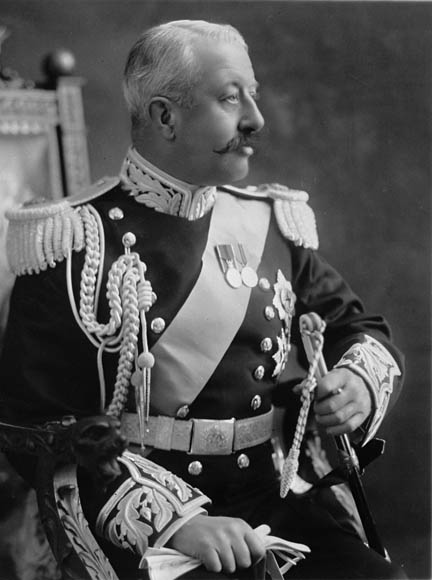
- Devonshire c. 1916–1921

11th Governor General of Canada
- In office 11 November 1916 – 2 August 1921
- Monarch: George V
- Prime Minister: Canadian • Robert Borden • Arthur Meighen; British • H. H. Asquith • David Lloyd George
- Preceded by: Prince Arthur, Duke of Connaught and Strathearn
- Succeeded by: The Lord Byng of Vimy

Secretary of State for the Colonies
- In office 24 October 1922 – 22 January 1924
- Monarch: George V
- Prime Minister: Bonar Law; Stanley Baldwin
- Preceded by: Winston Churchill
- Succeeded by: James Henry Thomas

Civil Lord of the Admiralty
- In office 25 May 1915 – 26 July 1916
- Monarch: George V
- Prime Minister: H. H. Asquith
- Preceded by: George Lambert
- Succeeded by: The Earl of Lytton

Financial Secretary to the Treasury
- In office 9 October 1903 – 5 December 1905
- Monarch: Edward VII
- Prime Minister: Arthur Balfour
- Preceded by: Arthur Elliot
- Succeeded by: Reginald McKenna

Treasurer of the Household
- In office 4 December 1900 – 13 October 1903
- Monarchs: Victoria; Edward VII
- Prime Minister: The Marquess of Salisbury; Arthur Balfour
- Preceded by: The Earl Howe
- Succeeded by: Marquess of Hamilton

Member of the House of Lords
- Lord Temporal
- In office 24 March 1908 – 6 May 1938
- Preceded by: The 8th Duke of Devonshire
- Succeeded by: The 10th Duke of Devonshire

Member of Parliament for West Derbyshire
- In office 2 June 1891 – 24 March 1908
- Preceded by: Lord Edward Cavendish
- Succeeded by: Earl of Kerry

Personal details
- Born: Victor Christian William Cavendish; 31 May 1868 Mayfair, London, England
- Died: 6 May 1938 (aged 69) Chatsworth House, Derbyshire, England
- Party: Liberal Unionist
- Spouse: Lady Evelyn Petty-Fitzmaurice (m. 1892)
- Children: Edward Cavendish, 10th Duke of Devonshire; Lady Maud Cavendish; Lady Blanche Cavendish; Lady Dorothy Macmillan; Rachel Stuart, Viscountess Stuart of Findhorn; Lord Charles Cavendish; Anne Montagu, Countess of Sandwich
- Parents: Lord Edward Cavendish; Emma Lascelles
- Education: Eton College; Trinity College, Cambridge
- Profession: Politician

Military service
- Allegiance: United Kingdom
- Branch/service: British Army
- Years of service: 1890–1911
- Rank: Second Lieutenant; Major
- Unit: Derbyshire Yeomanry

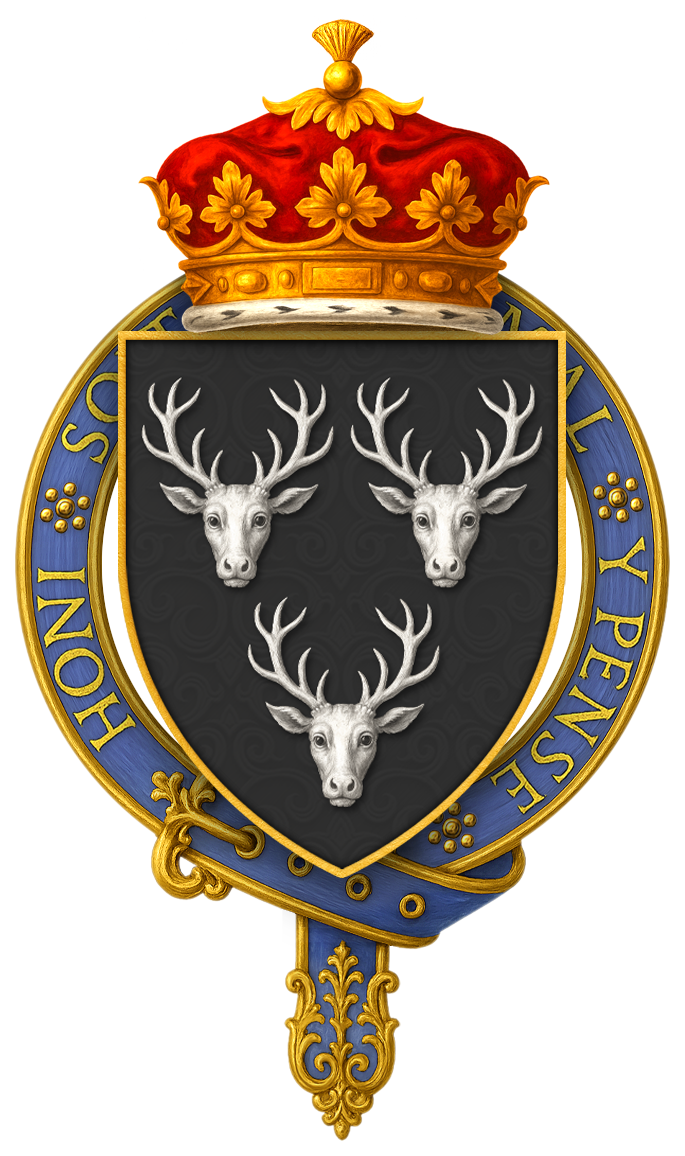
Garter-encircled shield of arms of Victor Cavendish, 9th Duke of Devonshire, KG, as displayed on his Order of the Garter stall plate in St. George's Chapel.

Victor Christian William Cavendish, 9th Duke of Devonshire (31 May 1868 – 6 May 1938), known as Victor Cavendish until 1908, was a British peer and politician who served as Governor General of Canada.

A member of the Cavendish family, Victor Cavendish was the son of Lord Edward Cavendish and nephew of Spencer Cavendish, 8th Duke of Devonshire. He was educated at Eton College and the University of Cambridge. After his father's death in 1891, he entered politics, winning his father's constituency unopposed. He held that seat until he inherited his uncle's dukedom in 1908. Thereafter, he took his place in the House of Lords, while, for a period at the same time, acting as mayor of Eastbourne and Chesterfield. He held various government posts both prior to and after his rise to the peerage. In 1916, King George V appointed him governor general of Canada on the recommendation of Prime Minister H. H. Asquith, replacing Prince Arthur, Duke of Connaught and Strathearn, as viceroy. He occupied that post until succeeded by Lord Byng of Vimy in 1921. The appointment was initially controversial, but by the time of his return to England, the Duke had earned praise for the way in which he carried out his official duties.

Following his tenure as governor general, Devonshire returned to political and diplomatic life, serving as Secretary of State for the Colonies between 1922 and 1924, before retiring to his estate in Derbyshire, where he died on 6 May 1938. He was the last Duke to hold a cabinet post.

The Duke of Devonshire was the father-in-law of Prime Minister of the United Kingdom Harold Macmillan.

== Early life, education and military career ==
Cavendish was born at Devonshire House, Mayfair, London, the eldest son of Lord Edward Cavendish, himself the third son of the 7th Duke of Devonshire, and Emma Lascelles, both the daughter of William Lascelles and Lord Edward's cousin. Cavendish's younger brother was Lord Richard Cavendish and his uncles were Spencer Cavendish, Marquess of Hartington (later the eighth Duke of Devonshire), and Lord Frederick Cavendish.

Cavendish was educated at Eton College before being admitted to Trinity College, Cambridge, on 30 May 1887, where he served as secretary of the Pitt Club. During his years at Cambridge, Cavendish was initiated into Isaac Newton University Lodge. His family was well-known at Cambridge. His grandfather was the Chancellor of the University until 1891. In 1874, William Cavendish, the Seventh Duke of Devonshire provided the funding for the Cavendish Laboratory for Physics and Chemistry at Cambridge. This is one of the most productive and influential labs in the world of natural sciences, leading to multiple Nobel Prizes in the twentieth century. Victor graduated in 1891 with a BA. Thereafter, he studied law and accounting in preparation for government service. He studied law at The Honourable Society of the Inner Temple and accounting at a private firm. He also served part-time with the Derbyshire Yeomanry, into which he was commissioned as a second lieutenant in 1890. He was promoted major in September 1901 and retired from the Yeomanry in 1911.

The younger of his two brothers, John Spencer, died on active service in the First World War.

== Marriage and children ==
On 30 July 1892, Cavendish married Lady Evelyn Petty-FitzMaurice, the elder daughter of Henry Petty-Fitzmaurice, 5th Marquess of Lansdowne, Viceroy of India and former Governor General of Canada. The couple had seven children:

- Edward William Spencer Cavendish, 10th Duke of Devonshire (8 May 1895 – 26 November 1950)
- Lady Maud Louisa Emma Cavendish (20 April 1896 – 30 March 1975), married 1) in 1917 Angus Alexander Mackintosh, who died of Spanish flu in 1918 while serving as a military attaché at the British embassy in Washington. 2) in 1923 Brigadier George Evan Michael Baillie, killed on active service 1941.
- Lady Blanche Katharine Cavendish (2 February 1898 – 1987), married Lt.-Col. Ivan John Murray Cobbold, son of John Dupuis Cobbold and Lady Evelyn Cobbold.
- Lady Dorothy Evelyn Cavendish (28 July 1900 – 21 May 1966), wife of Harold Macmillan, later Prime Minister of the United Kingdom and Earl of Stockton
- Lady Rachel Cavendish (22 January 1902 – 2 October 1977), later Viscountess Stuart of Findhorn.
- Lord Charles Arthur Francis Cavendish (29 August 1905 – 23 March 1944)
- Lady Anne Cavendish (20 August 1909 – 1981), Countess of Sandwich, wife of Henry Hunloke, later of Christopher Holland-Martin, and of Victor Montagu, all MPs (the last also 10th Earl of Sandwich)

Through his children's eventual marriages, Cavendish became the father-in-law of Henry Philip Hunloke; Christopher Holland-Martin; James Stuart, 1st Viscount Stuart of Findhorn; Harold Macmillan; Adele Astaire; and Victor Montagu, 10th Earl of Sandwich.

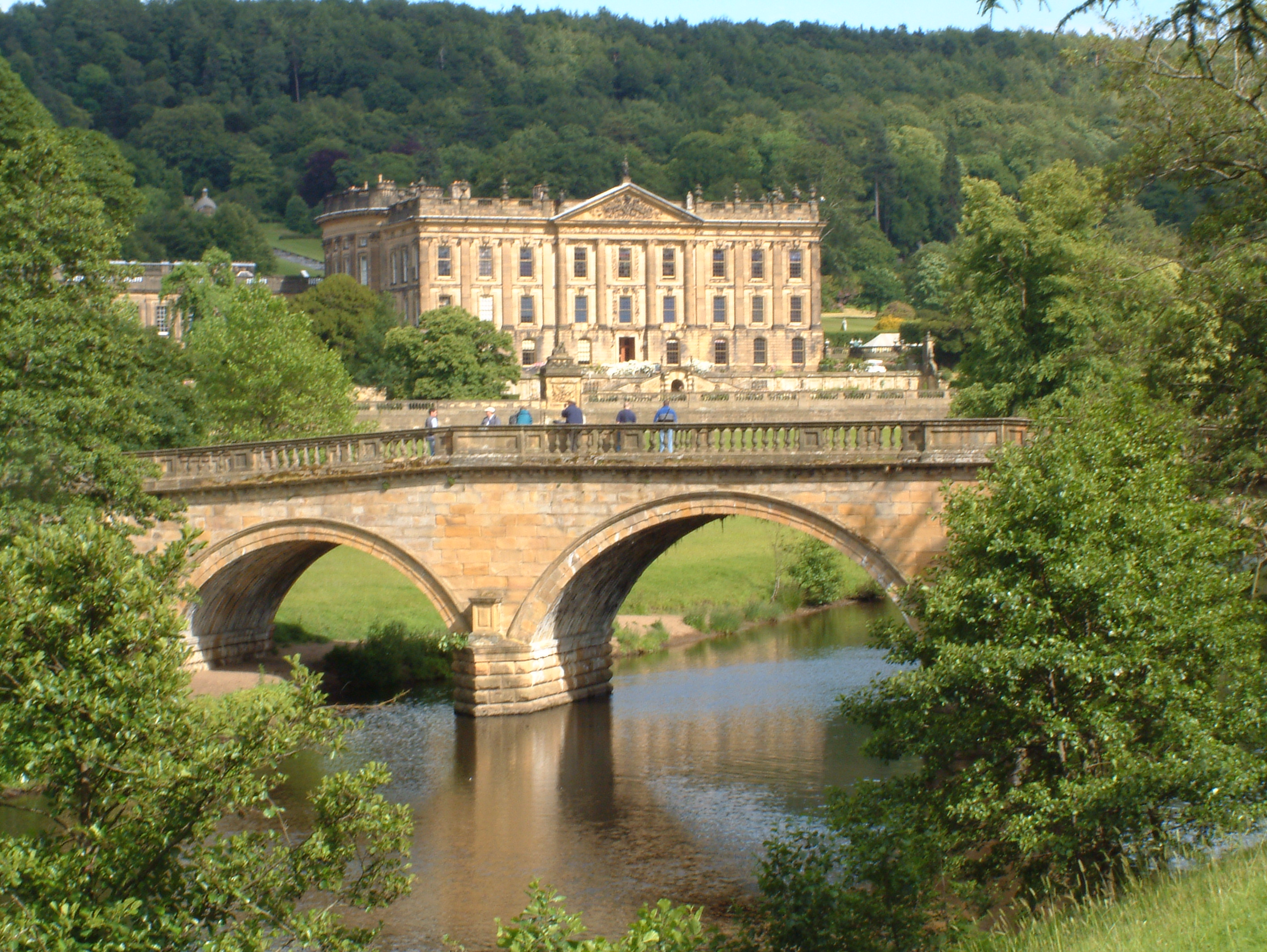
Chatsworth House, which Cavendish inherited upon acceding to the Dukedom of Devonshire in 1908

== Politics and industry ==
In May 1891, shortly before Cavendish graduated from Cambridge, his father, who sat as the Member of Parliament for West Derbyshire, died and Cavendish entered the race for that parliamentary seat and won it. He thus became the youngest member of the British House of Commons at the time.

For 17 years, Cavendish held parliamentary positions. Between 1900 and 1903, he served as Treasurer of the Household, from 1903 to 1905 as Financial Secretary to the Treasury, and on 11 December 1905 he was sworn of the Privy Council. In 1907, he was appointed a deputy lieutenant of Derbyshire.

When he succeeded to his uncle's dukedom on 24 March 1908, Devonshire, as he was thereafter known, was disqualified from holding his seat in the Commons, as he now held a place in the House of Lords. The same year, Devonshire was appointed as Lord Lieutenant of Derbyshire, when he acted as President of the Derbyshire Territorial Force (TF) Association and Honorary Colonel of the 5th (TF) Battalion of the Sherwood Foresters. In 1909 he was made Chancellor of the University of Leeds. He was then elected to two mayoral offices: first to that of Eastbourne, between 1909 and 1910, and then Chesterfield, from 1911 to 1912. In the House of Lords, Devonshire served as Conservative Chief Whip from 1911 and, after the Conservatives joined the government during the First World War, as joint Government Chief Whip in the upper chamber, holding office as Civil Lord of the Admiralty.

He took an active interest in the iron industry and from 1910 to 1912 was the president of the Iron and Steel Institute. The University of Leeds General Reception Committee honoured his presidential years on 30 September 1912 at an event at the hall of the Leeds Philosophical and Literary Society with ensuing tours of nearby foundries including those founded by Robert Middleton and the family of Albert Kitson, 2nd Baron Airedale, both of whom were members of the committee. Kitson was honorary vice-president of the institute from 1911.

During World War I he and the Derbyshire TF Association not only supported the TF battalions of the Sherwood Foresters but also raised a 'Pals battalion' for 'Kitchener's Army', the 16th (Service) Battalion, Sherwood Foresters (Chatsworth Rifles). He also became Honorary Colonel and Commandant of the Derbyshire Volunteer Regiment of the Volunteer Training Corps in 1918.

== Governor General of Canada ==
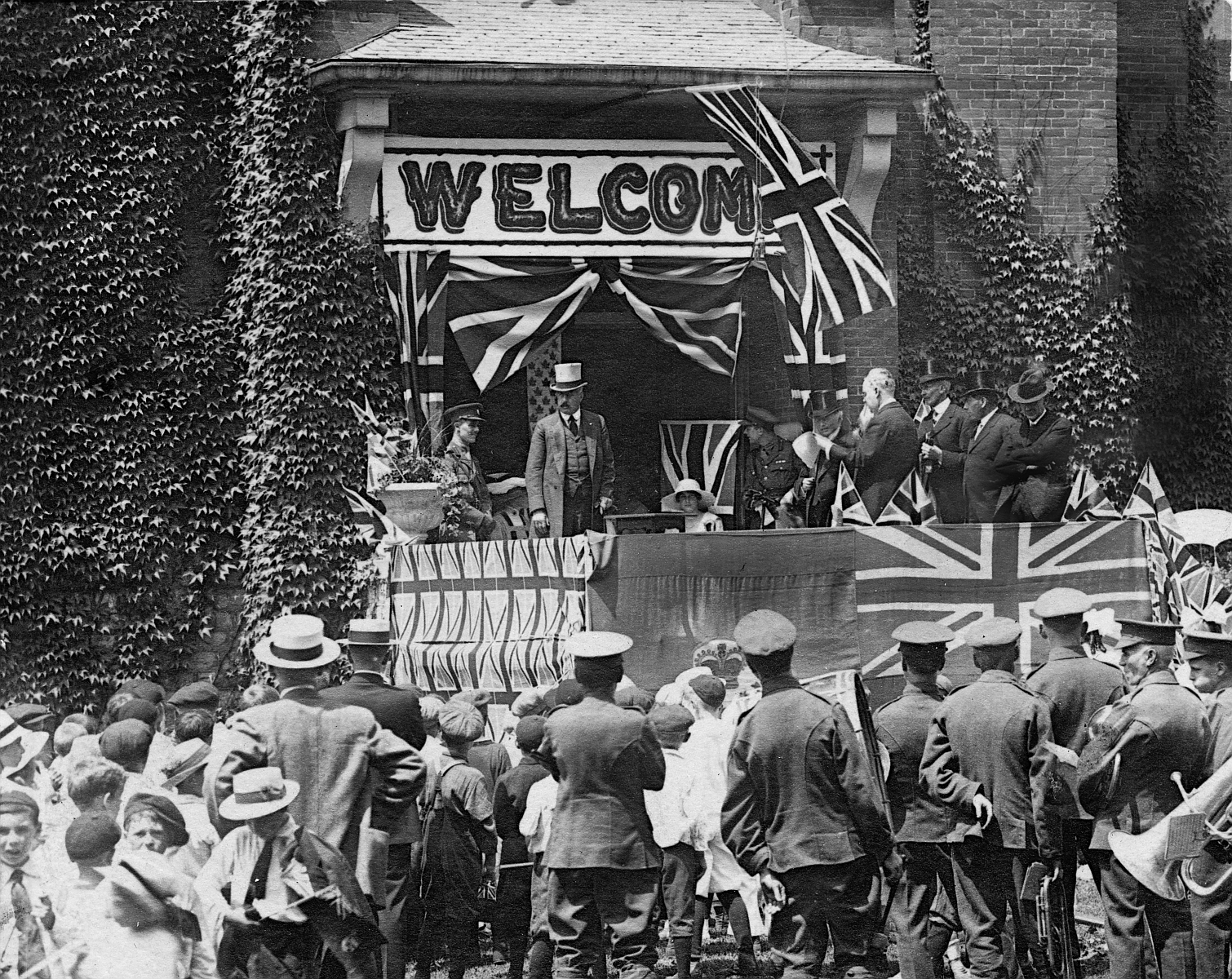
A welcome for Devonshire at Belleville during one of his tours of Canada while Governor General

It was announced on 8 August 1916 that King George V had, by commission under the royal sign-manual and signet, approved the recommendation of his British prime minister, H. H. Asquith, to appoint Devonshire as his representative in Canada. The appointment caused political problems, as Canadian Prime Minister Robert Borden had not been consulted on the matter, contrary to practice that had been well established by that time. Borden thus felt insulted, which led to considerable difficulties at the beginning of Devonshire's tenure after he was sworn in on 11 November 1916 during a ceremony held in Halifax.

In that era, there was social unrest in the country. The women's suffrage movement gaining momentum in Canada, calls were coming out of the prairies for socialist changes to the governmental system and war continued to rage around the world. Canada was providing troops and supplies, and shortly after his installation, acting on the advice of Borden, Devonshire introduced conscription, a decision that was particularly divisive between French and English Canadians and sparked the Conscription Crisis of 1917. The same year, he also travelled to Nova Scotia to survey the damage caused by the Halifax Explosion on 6 December. There, he met with survivors and addressed the women of the Voluntary Aid Detachment.

The Canadian victory in 1917 at the Battle of Vimy Ridge, however, helped fuel Canadian pride and nationalism at home, and the Governor General, while conscious of his role's remaining connection to the British government, used the victory positively and publicly to encourage reconciliation between Canada's two main linguistic groups. At all times, Devonshire was careful to consult with his prime minister and the leaders of His Majesty's Loyal Opposition in Canada on matters related to conscription and the war effort.

Devonshire took an active interest in the lives of Canadians and conducted various tours of the country to meet with them. As a landowner himself, the Governor General was particularly focused on the development of farming in Canada and during his travels. At agricultural and horticultural fairs, shows, and sugaring-off parties in Gatineau, he discussed agricultural issues with farmers and other people in the industry. His speeches often referred to Canada's potential to lead the world in agricultural research and development, and one of his major projects as viceroy was establishing experimental farms, including the Crown's central one in Ottawa. At the same time, Devonshire acted as a patron of the arts.

When not on tour or residing at La Citadelle, the viceregal residence in Quebec City at which the Duke enjoyed spending time, he frequently visited the National Gallery and hosted theatrical performances at Rideau Hall. There, on the grounds of the royal residence, during the winters, the Devonshires also hosted tobogganing and skating parties, as well as hockey matches. Officially, in 1918 Devonshire travelled to the United States to meet President Woodrow Wilson informally, and the following year, he was host to Prince Edward, Prince of Wales, during his first tour of Canada.

By the end of his tenure as Governor General, Devonshire had overcome all of the initial suspicions that had surrounded his appointment, and both men who served as his Canadian prime minister, Borden and Arthur Meighen, came to view him as a personal friend of them and also of Canada. The former said of Devonshire: "No Governor General has come with a more comprehensive grasp of public questions as they touch not only this country and the United Kingdom, but the whole Empire". The Duke left as a mark of his time in Canada the Devonshire Cup, for the annual golf competition of the Canadian Seniors Golf Association, and the Duke of Devonshire Trophy, for the Ottawa Horticultural Society. While in Canada, Devonshire's two aides-de-camp married his daughters.

== Later career ==
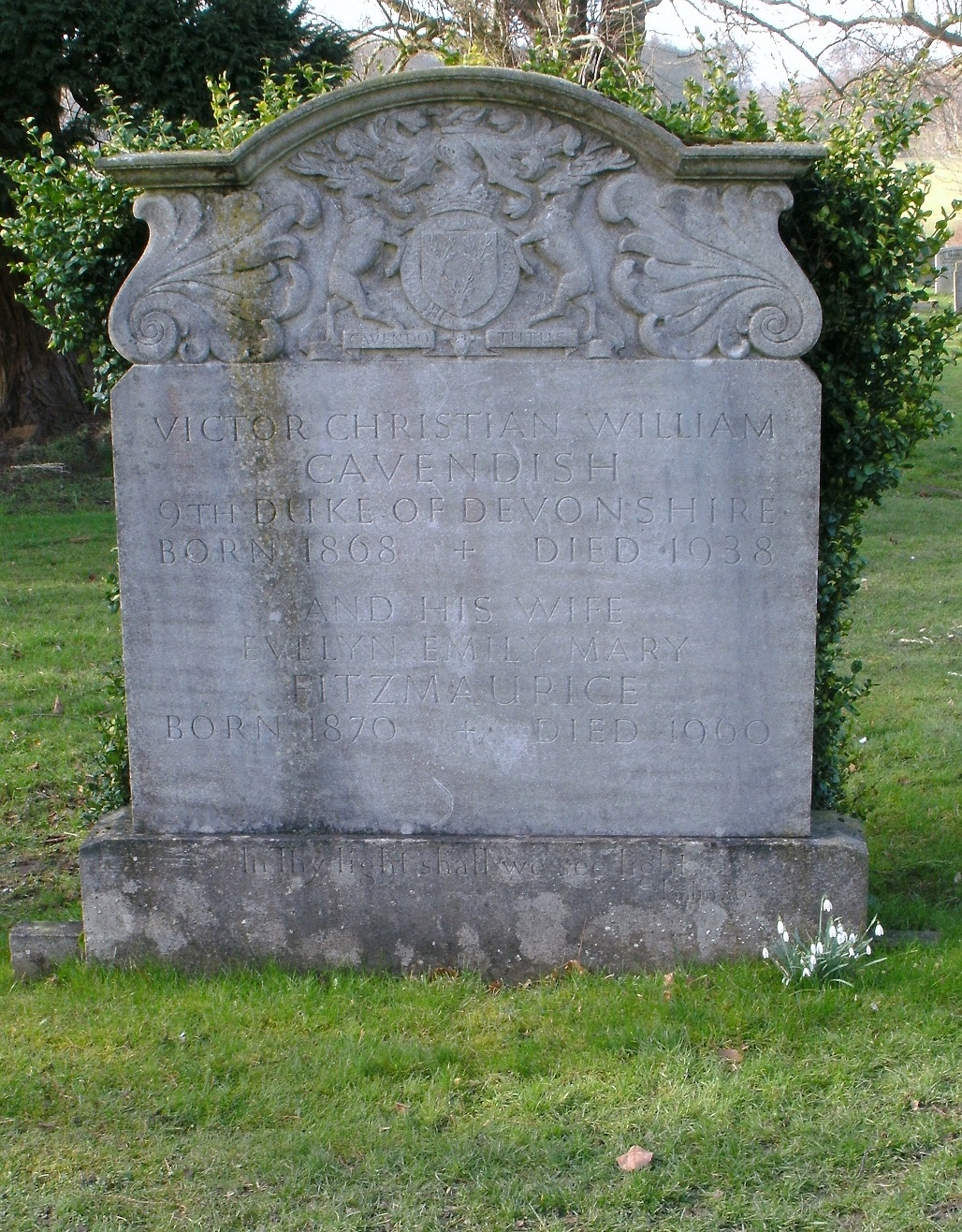
St Peter's Churchyard, Edensor – grave of Victor Cavendish, 9th Duke of Devonshire KG, GCMG, GCVO, TD, PC (1868–1938)

On returning to England, Devonshire worked at the League of Nations before serving from 1922 to 1924 as Secretary of State for the Colonies (with a seat in the Cabinet, while headed by Prime Ministers Bonar Law and Stanley Baldwin). There, he opposed the views of Lord Delamere, the leading white settler in Kenya, who had helped found the Happy Valley set and campaigned for self-government by white settlers. Devonshire advocated protecting the interests of the Africans. The Devonshire White Paper of 1923, which he authored, was cited as a reason why Kenya did not develop as a white minority rule, similar to the model of the Union of South Africa and Southern Rhodesia.

In 1922, he was appointed by King George V to the committee that was charged with looking into how honours were to be bestowed in the United Kingdom.

In 1925, the Cavendish Golf Club was opened in Derbyshire. In 1923, he commissioned the Lido Prize winner Dr. Alister MacKenzie to design the course. MacKenzie graduated from University of Cambridge in 1891 and attended the university at the same time as the future Duke. The land afforded by the Duke at the time of commission was not large. MacKenzie believed that the quality of a hole was not determined by its length. The resulting design is considered one of the finest short courses (less than 6,000 yards) in the United Kingdom. The course takes advantage of the natural features of the area, which is a hallmark of MacKenzie's designs. Augusta National, Cypress Point, Royal Melbourne, Meadow Club, Pasatiempo, and Crystal Downs are other courses designed by the same architect. Cavendish Golf Club is considered by some to be the inspiration for Augusta National, home of the Masters Tournament. In the quiet section of Buxton, the course is home to a variety of wildlife, including deer, hares, buzzards, kestrels, and sparrow hawks.

From 1933 to his death, he was Honorary Colonel of the 24 (Derbyshire Yeomanry) Armoured Car Company, Royal Tank Regiment, in the Territorial Army. He simultaneously continued to run his agricultural land holdings, especially around Chatsworth House, where he died in May 1938.

== Arms ==
Coat of arms of Victor Cavendish, 9th Duke of Devonshire
Crest A serpent nowed proper. Escutcheon Sable three stags' heads caboshed argent. Supporters Dester, A horse argent bridled gules; Sinister, A stag proper. Motto Cavendo tutus (Secure by caution). Orders The Most Noble Order of the Garter - Knight Companion (KG).

== Honours ==
Viceregal styles of The Duke of Devonshire
- Reference style: His Grace; Sa Grâce
- Spoken style: Your Grace; Votre Grâce

Ribbon bars of the Duke of Devonshire

Appointments

- (United Kingdom) 11 December 1905 – 6 May 1938: Member of His Majesty's Most Honourable Privy Council (PC)
- (United Kingdom) 19 August 1912 – 6 May 1938: Knight Grand Cross of the Royal Victorian Order (GCVO)
- (United Kingdom) 28 July 1916 – 6 May 1938: Knight Grand Cross of the Most Distinguished Order of Saint Michael and Saint George (GCMG)
- (United Kingdom) 18 August 1916 – 27 November 1917: Knight of Grace of the Order of St John of Jerusalem (KGStJ)
  - 27 November 1917 – 6 May 1938: Knight of Justice of the Order of St John of Jerusalem (KJStJ)
- 11 November 1916 – 2 August 1921: Chief Scout for Canada
- 11 November 1916 – 6 May 1938: Honorary Member of the Royal Military College of Canada Club
- (England) 1 January 1916 – 6 May 1938: Knight Companion of the Most Noble Order of the Garter (KG)

Medals

- (United Kingdom) 1902: King Edward VII Coronation Medal
- (United Kingdom) 1911: King George V Coronation Medal
- (United Kingdom) 1935: King George V Silver Jubilee Medal
- (United Kingdom) 1937: King George VI Coronation Medal
- (United Kingdom) 1923: Territorial Decoration

=== Honorary military appointments ===
- (Canada) 11 November 1916 – 2 August 1921: Colonel of the Governor General's Horse Guards
- (Canada) 11 November 1916 – 2 August 1921: Colonel of the Governor General's Foot Guards
- (Canada) 11 November 1916 – 2 August 1921: Colonel of the Canadian Grenadier Guards

=== Honorary degrees ===
- (Canada) 1917: University of Alberta, Doctor of Laws (LLD)

=== Honorific eponyms ===
Awards

- Canada: Devonshire Cup
- Ontario: Duke of Devonshire Trophy

Geographic locations

Ottawa, Ontario Devonshire Community Public School

- Saskatchewan: Devonshire Crescent, Imperial

== See also ==
- Bell Memorial
- Duke of Devonshire

Government offices
Preceded by Prince Arthur, Duke of Connaught and Strathearn	Governor General of Canada; 1916–1921	Succeeded by The Lord Byng of Vimy
Political offices
Preceded by The Earl Howe	Treasurer of the Household; 1900–1903	Succeeded by Marquess of Hamilton
Preceded by Arthur Elliot	Financial Secretary to the Treasury; 1903–1905	Succeeded by Reginald McKenna
Preceded by George Lambert	Civil Lord of the Admiralty; 1915–1916	Succeeded by The Earl of Lytton
Preceded by The Lord Colebrooke	Government Chief Whip in the House of Lords; 1915–1916; With: The Lord Colebrooke	Succeeded by The Lord Colebrooke; The Lord Hylton
Preceded by Winston Churchill	Secretary of State for the Colonies; 1922–1924	Succeeded by James Henry Thomas
Parliament of the United Kingdom
Preceded by Lord Edward Cavendish	Member of Parliament for West Derbyshire; 1891–1908	Succeeded by Earl of Kerry
Party political offices
Preceded by The Earl Waldegrave	Conservative Chief Whip in the House of Lords; 1911–1916	Succeeded by The Lord Hylton
Academic offices
Preceded by The Marquess of Ripon	Chancellor of the University of Leeds; 1909–1938	Succeeded by The 10th Duke of Devonshire
Honorary titles
Preceded by The 8th Duke of Devonshire	Lord Lieutenant of Derbyshire; 1908–1938	Succeeded by The 10th Duke of Devonshire
Peerage of England
Preceded by Spencer Cavendish	Duke of Devonshire; 1908–1938	Succeeded by Edward Cavendish
