= Henry Petty-Fitzmaurice, 6th Marquess of Lansdowne =

British soldier and politician (1872–1936)

Lieutenant Colonel The Most Honourable The Marquess of Lansdowne DSO MVO
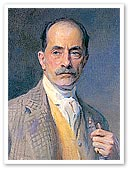

Member of the House of Lords Lord Temporal
- In office 3 June 1927 – 5 March 1936; Hereditary Peerage
- Preceded by: The 5th Marquess of Lansdowne
- Succeeded by: The 7th Marquess of Lansdowne

Senator
- In office 11 December 1922 – 5 June 1929

Member of Parliament for West Derbyshire
- In office 15 April 1908 – 25 November 1918
- Preceded by: Victor Cavendish
- Succeeded by: Charles White

Personal details
- Born: 14 January 1872 London, England
- Died: 5 March 1936 (aged 64) London, England
- Party: Conservative; Liberal Unionist; Independent
- Spouse: Elizabeth Hope (m. 1904)
- Children: 5, including Charles
- Parents: Henry Petty-Fitzmaurice (father); Maud Hamilton (mother)

Lieutenant-Colonel Henry William Edmund Petty-Fitzmaurice, 6th Marquess of Lansdowne, DSO, MVO (14 January 1872 – 5 March 1936), styled Earl of Kerry until 1927, was a British soldier and politician.

== Background ==
Lansdowne was the son of Henry Petty-Fitzmaurice, 5th Marquess of Lansdowne, and his wife, Maud, daughter of James Hamilton, 1st Duke of Abercorn and Lady Louisa Russell.

== Military career ==
Lord Kerry was originally commissioned into a volunteer battalion of the Oxfordshire Light Infantry, but transferred to the regular army as a second lieutenant in the Grenadier Guards on 14 August 1895, and was promoted to lieutenant on 2 March 1898. He served in South Africa during the Second Boer War, where he was from 25 January 1900 a staff officer as an extra aide-de-camp to Lord Roberts, the commander in chief of British Forces in South Africa. For his service in the war, he was awarded the Distinguished Service Order (DSO). On the formation of the Irish Guards in 1900, he transferred to that regiment while still in South Africa, and was promoted captain on 6 October 1900. He resigned in 1906 with the rank of major. He returned to the Army during World War I, reaching the rank of lieutenant colonel.

== Political career ==
Lansdowne was Liberal Unionist and later Conservative member of parliament (MP) for West Derbyshire from 1908 to 1918. He was a member of the Senate of the Irish Free State from 1922 to 1929, to which he was nominated by the executive council. He succeeded his father as Marquess of Lansdowne in 1927, with a seat in the British House of Lords, meaning that he had the unusual distinction of serving in the national legislatures of two different countries at the same time.

== Family ==
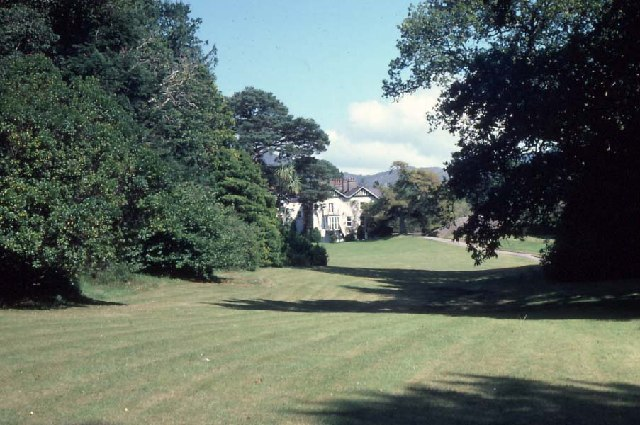
Derreen House and Garden

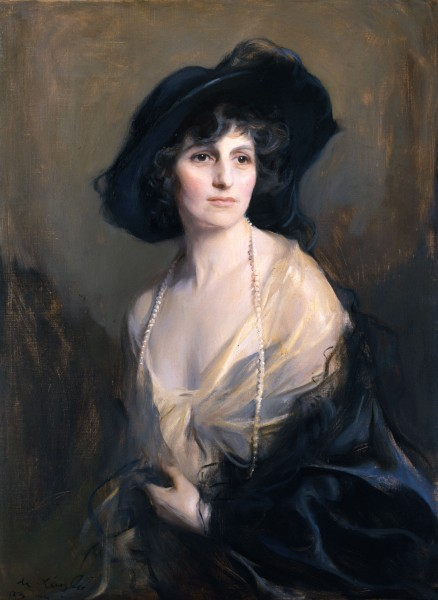
Marchioness of Lansdowne, portrait by Philip de László, 1923

He married Elizabeth Caroline Hope, on 16 February 1904, granddaughter of George William Hope and Sir John Leslie, 1st Baronet. They had five children:

- Katherine Evelyn Constance Petty-Fitzmaurice (1912–1995), married 1933 Edward Clive Bigham, 3rd Viscount Mersey (1906–1979) and had issue, including Richard Bigham, 4th Viscount Mersey. She became 12th Baroness of Nairne after inheriting the title and Derreen House and Gardens (Lauragh, County Kerry) from her brother Charles Petty-Fitzmaurice in 1944.
- Henry Maurice John Petty-Fitzmaurice, Earl of Kerry (1913–1933), died young when he fell in front of a London Underground train at Regent's Park station.
- Charles Petty-Fitzmaurice, 7th Marquess of Lansdowne (1917–1944), killed in action in Italy.
- Lieutenant Lord Edward Norman Petty-Fitzmaurice (1922–1944), killed in action in Normandy.
- Lady Elizabeth Mary Petty-Fitzmaurice (1927–2016), married the late Major Charles William Lambton, grandson of George Lambton, 2nd Earl of Durham, and had issue.

He died in Marylebone, aged 64.

== Arms ==
Coat of arms of Henry Petty-Fitzmaurice, 6th Marquess of Lansdowne
Coronet A Coronet of a Marquess Crest 1st, a beehive beset with bees, diversely volant, proper; 2nd, a centaur drawing a bow and arrow, proper, the part from the waist argent. Escutcheon Quarterly : 1st and 4th Ermine, on a bend, azure a magnetic needle pointing at a polar star, or, (Petty); 2nd and 3rd Argent, a saltier, gules, a chief, ermine (Fitzmaurice). Supporters Two pegasi, ermine; bridled, crined, winged, and unguled, or, each charged on the shoulder with a fleur-de-lis, azure. Motto Virtute non verbis (By courage, not words).

Parliament of the United Kingdom
Preceded by Victor Cavendish	Member of Parliament for West Derbyshire; 1908–1918	Succeeded by Charles White
Peerage of Great Britain
Preceded by Henry Petty-Fitzmaurice	Marquess of Lansdowne; 1927–1936	Succeeded by Charles Petty-Fitzmaurice
