= Fine Cell Work =

Charity working with British prisoners

- Formation: 1995
- Founder: Lady Anne Tree
- Type: Charity
- Headquarters: London
- Services: Education, needlework
- Website: finecellwork.co.uk

Fine Cell Work is a British charity that runs rehabilitation projects in prisons by training prisoners in paid, skilled needlework to be undertaken by them in their cells. It then sells the hand-stitched cushions, quilts and giftware in its online store and through supporter events around the country. Since 2018 the charity has also provided apprenticeships in textiles and mentoring programmes for ex-offenders at a workshop in south London.

== History ==
Fine Cell Work was founded in 1995 by Lady Anne Tree (1927–2010), and led by founding director Katy Emck. It is now run by its managing director, Victoria Gillies, and a staff of fourteen.

Prior to the foundation of the charity, prisoners were unable to receive payment for cell work in the United Kingdom, for which the charity founder, Lady Anne Tree campaigned extensively. In 1992, the law was changed enabling payment to be made to prisoners.

Patrons of the charity include Libby Purves, Dame Judi Dench and The Lord Ramsbotham, former Chief Inspector of Prisons.

In May 2026, Fine Cell Work was granted a royal warrant of appointment by Queen Camilla.

== Operations ==
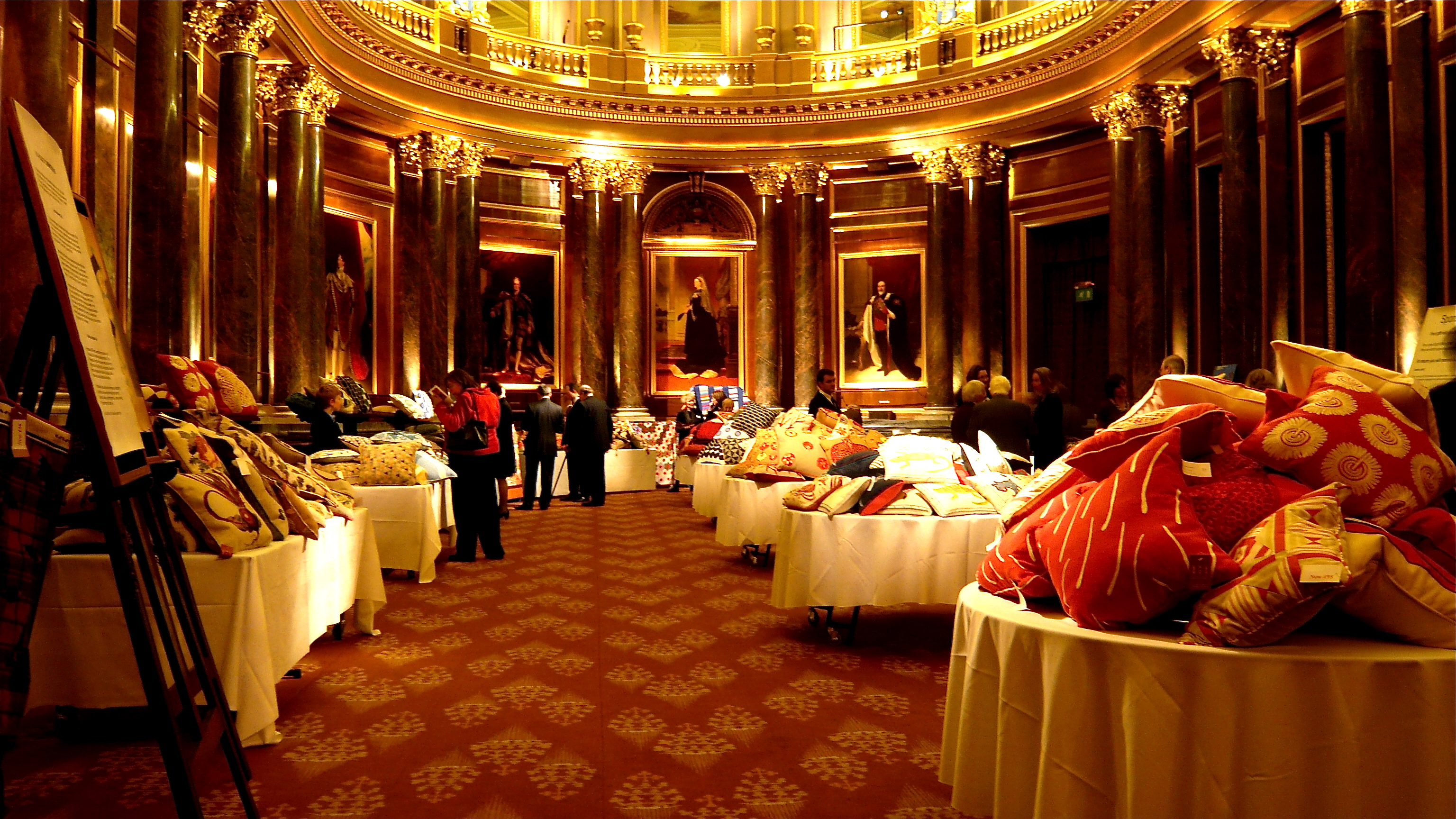
Fine Cell Work charity sale at the Drapers’ Hall, London

As of 2017, Fine Cell Work operated in 32 British prisons and engaged with 550 prisoners a year. This workforce is mostly made up of male prisoners, estimated at 96% male across 32 British prisons. It has the largest workforce of hand stitchers in Europe, working with 270 prisoners at any one time. The stitchers are able to gain a level 2 qualification and save money for their release. There is also an external workshop where FCW graduates can get work experience and be employed in textiles production, sales and stock roles.

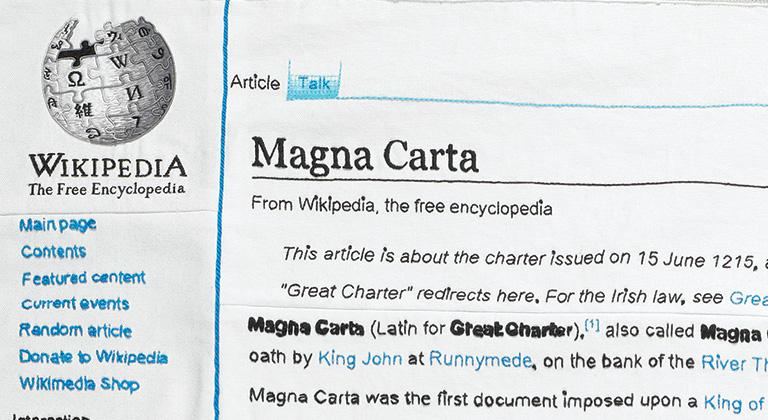
Detail from Magna Carta (An Embroidery) (2015), designed by Cornelia Parker, and stitched in large part by members of Fine Cell Work

Prisoners receive a small payment for the needlework, estimated to be an average of 24 hours of cell work per person per week. In 2016 the approximate combined total earned by the workforce across all prisons was £75,000. The items are then sold online on the charity's website and in exclusive designer shops. Items typically include cushions and Christmas decorations.

Following a grant from the National Lottery, in 2017 Fine Cell Work set up a training workshop in London to help ex-offenders develop skills and further qualifications on release from prison. Needleworkers are given an apprenticeship in all aspects of textile production and distribution and work closely with experienced mentors. The programme is known as Open the Gate and takes place at the charity's hub in south London.

== Collaborations ==
Fine Cell Work has collaborated with a wide variety of designers including Cath Kidston, Cressida Bell, Ben Pentreath, William Yeoward, Margo Selby and Kit Kemp. The products have been sold in the V&A, Conran and Tate Modern shops. Major works have also been commissioned by the V&A for its 2010 exhibition of British Quilts, and by artists including Cornelia Parker and Gavin Turk.

== See also ==
- Storybook Dads
- Koestler Arts
