= Shute House, Donhead St Mary =

House and garden in England

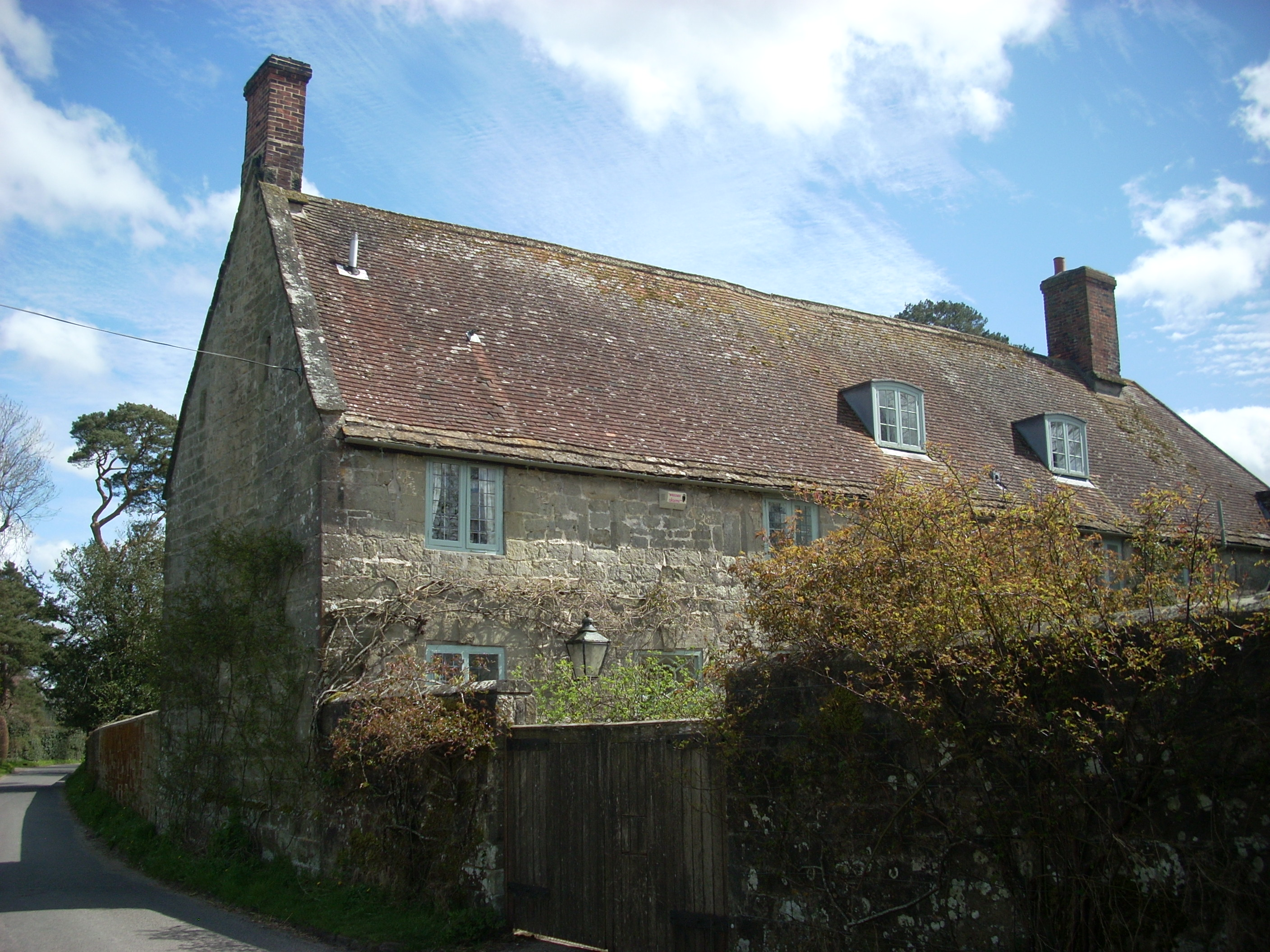

- Location within Wiltshire
- 51.020°N 2.138°W
- Type: House and garden
- Location: Donhead St Mary, Wiltshire, England

Site notes
- Owner: Sir John and Lady Suzy Lewis

National Register of Historic Parks and Gardens
- Official name: Shute House Gardens
- Designated: 18 August 2020
- Reference no.: 1468669

Listed Building – Grade II
- Official name: Shute House, Donhead St Mary
- Designated: 6 January 1966
- Reference no.: 1146075

Shute House, Donhead St Mary, Wiltshire, England is a former rectory, now a private home, notable for its gardens designed by Geoffrey Jellicoe. About 2 1/2 miles (4.0 km) east of Shaftesbury, the house and garden are at the very southern edge of Wiltshire, on the border with Dorset. The house is a Grade II listed building, while the gardens have a higher Grade II* listing on Historic England's Register of Historic Parks and Gardens. They have been described as Jellicoe's finest work. He worked at Shute House between 1969 and 1983 for the then owners, Michael and Anne Tree, returning to revitalise the garden for new owners in the mid-1990s, in what became his final work before his death in 1996.

== History ==
Shute House has a central position in the small village of Donhead St Mary, about 250m northwest of St Mary's Church. A 16th-century rectory house survives as one range of the present house. In the early 18th century, a new range was added, of three bays and faced in ashlar. (Note: Jellicoe was alert to Shute's range of architectural and historical styles, writing, "the house is a complex of history, from the medieval to the Palladian".) In the 1940s, the Church of England sold the rectory and it became a private home. Renamed Shute House in 1955, it was designated a Grade II listed building in 1966.

In 1968, the house was bought by Lady Anne Tree, and her husband, Michael. Lady Anne, a sister of the 11th Duke of Devonshire, was a noted prison reformer and her husband, Michael, was the son of Nancy Lancaster, the interior designer. They had earlier lived at Mereworth Castle in Kent, and had a connection to Geoffrey Jellicoe though work he had undertaken for Nancy and Ronald Tree at Ditchley Park in the 1930s. By the time of his work at Shute House, Jellicoe had become one of England's most successful landscape gardeners. Training originally as an architect, he moved into landscape gardening in the 1930s, helping to establish the Institute of Landscape Architects and becoming the founding president of the International Federation of Landscape Architects. During a 60-year career, he designed a series of major gardens, both in the United Kingdom and worldwide. He also made a significant contribution to landscape gardening theory; exploring, in particular, links between design and the subconscious, in which he was much influenced by the ideas of Carl Jung, and the use of water in design. The joint work Jellicoe wrote with his wife, Susan Pares, Water: The Use of Water in Landscape Architecture, was published while he was engaged at Shute.

== Gardens ==
Ode to Charles Bridgeman,
Your Serpentine is Grand and Fine,
Forgive me when I claim that mine,
Made at Shute in seventy-nine,
is much more Elegant than thine.

— Poem by Jellicoe, written on one of his design sketches for the meadow lake at Shute (Note: When Jellicoe began work at Shute, he had returned to the detailed, architectural draftsmanship of his youth. Michael Spens, in his comprehensive study, The Complete Landscape Designs and Gardens of Geoffrey Jellicoe, reproduces a number of the drawings Jellicoe produced for Shute, including an example from 1985, which he coloured on his return to the gardens in 1993.)

The Trees commissioned Jellicoe to build a series of gardens around the house, which he undertook between 1969 and 1983. The result is reputed to have been Jellicoe's favourite design, and is considered by many horticulturalists to be his finest work. In the 1990s, the house was bought by Sir John and Lady Suzy Lewis, who persuaded Jellicoe to come out of retirement to undertake a restoration of the gardens which had deteriorated. (Note: As well as restoring the gardens, the Lewis' undertook reconstruction of the house, including the building of a new porch. Bridget Cherry, in the revised Wiltshire Pevsner, published in 2002, notes that the porch incorporates a frieze and window surround designed by Robert Adam, and originally at Bowood House.)

The gardens at Shute focus on water. (Note: Jellicoe wrote, "There was never any doubt that it was the thought, presence, action and sound of water that was holding together the competing ideas that had been introduced into the woodlands - ideas remotely associated with Islam, Greece, the Middle Ages, the primeval, and other times and cultures".) A natural spring, a source of the River Nadder, is divided into two channels. One is naturalistic, the other a straight, formal rill in which the water flows over a series of copper ledges, designed to create musical notes. The bubble fountains at the top of the rill are gravity-operated, and were inspired by examples Jellicoe saw in Kashmir. The two channels reunite in a bog garden at the end of the landscape. Jellicoe designed twin grottoes, influenced by William Kent, which flank the channels. Other elements in the garden include reconstructed fish ponds, a canal, a lily pool and a camellia walk. Sculptural components include statuary, (Note: A number of the statues in the garden were bought from the Tree's former home, Mereworth Castle.) bridges and an exedra.

The gardens at Shute House were given Grade II* listed status on 18 August 2020. (Note: Two other works by Jellicoe were recognised by Historic England at the same time as Shute; the Kennedy Memorial landscape at Runneymede and a watercourse at Moreton, Merseyside.) The listing followed a three-year collaboration between Historic England and the Gardens Trust to raise awareness and appreciation of important English gardens designed in the post-war period. The gardens are open for group visits by prior appointment.

== Sources ==
- Pevsner, Nikolaus; Cherry, Bridget (2002). Wiltshire. The Buildings Of England. New Haven, US and London: Yale University Press. ISBN 978-0-300-09659-0. OCLC 228662032.
- Spens, Michael (1994). The Complete Landscape Designs and Gardens of Geoffrey Jellicoe. London: Thames & Hudson. ISBN 978-0-500-01596-4. OCLC 928039933.
