= Martine Rose =

British-Jamaican menswear designer

- Born: 24 November 1980 (age 45); Croydon, England.
- Education: Middlesex University
- Label: Martine Rose
- Website: www.martine-rose.com

Martine Rose (born 24 November 1980) is a British-Jamaican menswear designer and founder of the Martine Rose label. Her designs draw inspiration from her experiences and interest in rave, hip-hop and punk subcultures. In November 2026, she was appointed the Creative Director of Balenciaga.

== Early life and education ==
Rose was born in Croydon, South London in 1980; her family is British and Jamaican. Rose's mother was a nurse and her father was an accountant so she spent much of her time in Tooting with her grandmother and her cousins. After a year at Camberwell College of Arts she enrolled at Middlesex University and graduated in 2002 with a degree in fashion design.

== Career ==
Rose first started a label LMNOP with now-stylist Tamara Rothstein, a friend and frequent collaborator. The line folded in 2005. In 2007 she established her eponymous label focused on menswear.

Since its inception, Rose has been known for showing her collections in non-traditional spaces, including a street market, a community climbing gym, and a cul-de-sac in Camden, London . She has been known to disregard fashion's seasonal calendar and expectations, sometimes because of financial constraints. Some of her collections have been released via short films, digital lookbooks, and Craigslist.

In 2011 she was supported by new talent showcase Fashion East during London Fashion Week. She also collaborated with workwear boots manufacturer CAT on a limited line of boots.

In 2015, when fashion designer Demna Gvasalia joined Balenciaga as creative director, he hired Rose as a consultant, elevating her profile in the fashion industry.

In 2017 she started a multi-year collaboration with Napapijri that ran until 2019, and later was revived in 2025.

In 2018 Rose released a collaboration with Nike. The release included Rose's take on the tracksuit and Nike's Monarch model. She was inspired by English and American sports culture. The collection was released on Craigslist in London and later sold at retailers.

Her AW20 show took place at Torriano Primary School, her daughter's primary school in Kentish Town.

In 2021, the brand accelerator Tomorrow acquired a 60 per cent stake in Martine Rose through a share-swap agreement that also gave Rose an undisclosed interest in Tomorrow. The partnership was intended to help the label expand its supplier network, wholesale distribution and direct-to-consumer business.

In January 2023, Rose was a guest designer at Pitti Uomo in Florence, where she presented her Autumn/Winter 2023 collection. The event marked the first time she had shown a collection outside London.

By June 2023, the company employed 20 people and was carried by approximately 200 retailers.

In 2024 Rose collaborated with Supreme. Supreme later released a second collaboration with her for Fall 2026 collection.

In January 2026, Rose presented her Autumn/Winter 2026 menswear collection during Paris Fashion Week. In March 2026, Rose cancelled production of the collection despite what she described as a successful sales season. Tomorrow Ltd, which held a majority stake in Rose's label, subsequently disputed that production had been cancelled and said that it would proceed as planned. Later that month, Tomorrow Ltd agreed to be sold to Progetto 11, the parent company of Italian e-commerce business The Level Group. The financial terms were not disclosed. The Business of Fashion reported that Rose had previously submitted a bid to regain control of her label, but that the bid had not been accepted by Tomorrow.

In November 2026, Kering announced the appointment of Martine Rose as creative director of Balenciaga, succeeding Pierpaolo Piccioli. She is scheduled to assume the position on 16 November 2026.

== Design ==
As a designer, Rose counts her upbringing around her older British-Jamaican cousins who were into raves, reggae, Lovers rock, punk, and dance music as formative. Rose has been influenced by her own experiences at 90s London raves and her awareness of different subcultures in the city coming together around music. Overall, she considers her Jamaican upbringing as a major influence in her attitude towards fashion design and style.

Rose's label developed a cult following, with her designs featuring exaggerated proportions quickly becoming characteristic of her collections earlier on in her career. While considered a menswear designer, Rose designs her pieces with a broad spectrum of people in mind. Her interest in nightlife and music scenes has led her to use fabrics in menswear that are typically more common in womenswear, like fur, satin and lurex.

== Awards ==
2023: British Menswear Designer of the Year at the Fashion Awards.
