= Joo Yeon Sir =

South Korean musician (born 1990)

- Born: June 29, 1990 (age 35); Seoul, South Korea
- Occupation: Violinist
- Musical career
- Genres: Classical
- Instrument: Violin

Korean name
- Hangul: 서주연
- Hanja: 徐周延
- RR: Seo Juyeon
- MR: Sŏ Chuyŏn
- Website: www.jooyeonsir.com

Joo Yeon Sir (Korean: 서주연; born June 29, 1990) is a South Korean-born British violinist and composer.

Sir was born in Seoul, South Korea. Sir was educated at the Purcell School and at the Royal College of Music, London, where she studied with Dr. Felix Andrievsky. Sir has performed as recitalist, chamber musician, and soloist with orchestras at various venues including the Royal Albert Hall, Royal Festival Hall, Wales Millennium Centre, Barbican Hall, Wigmore Hall, Liverpool Symphony Hall, London Arts Club, Fairfield Halls, the Foundling Museum, and St James's Palace in the presence of Prince Charles. She has appeared as soloist with the Royal Philharmonic, Philharmonia, and Bournemouth Symphony orchestras as well as with her regular recital partners Irina Andrievsky (piano) and Laura Snowden (guitar). Her recordings have been regularly featured on the BBC, Classic FM, Scala, RTÉ, and France Musique radio stations.

In 2006, at the age of sixteen, Sir became the Overall Grand Prix Laureate at Nedyalka Simeonova International Violin Competition in Haskovo, Bulgaria, where her gala performance was broadcast on Radio Bulgaria (BNR). Sir is also recipient of Royal Philharmonic Society's Emily Anderson Prize 2007, MBF Music Education Award 2008, and the Second Prize at Windsor Festival International String Competition 2008, as the youngest finalist. In 2014, Sir was awarded the Royal College of Music's President's Award and the prestigious The Arts Club Karl Jenkins Classical Music Award.

As a composer, Joo Yeon Sir has won the First Prize and the title of BBC/The Guardian Young Composer of the Year 2005 at the age of fourteen for her composition Conflict in Time, which has been performed at Wigmore Hall, Cadogan Hall by Endymion and has been broadcast on BBC Radio 3. Her projects have been performed at the "Birtwistle Games" Festival at the South Bank Centre and her work, "Cold Dark Matter - an exploded view" for orchestra, inspired by British sculptor Cornelia Parker, was premiered at the Queen Elizabeth Hall, South Bank Centre in February 2007. In 2018, she was commissioned to write a work for solo violin, My Dear Bessie, based on the love letters of Chris Barker and Bessie Moore during the Second World War. Sir has also collaborated with contemporary composers, notably Sir Karl Jenkins, who composed Chatterbox! and Lament for the Valley especially for her.

== Discography ==
Date	Album	Works	Label
2022	Solitude	Henrich Ignaz Franz Biber, Passacaglia in G Minor Niccolò Paganini, Caprice No. 10 in G Minor, Op. 1 Niccolò Paganini, Caprice No. 24 in a Minor, Op. 1 Fritz Kreisler, Recitativo and Scherzo-caprice, Op. 6 Joo Yeon Sir, My Dear Bessie Roxanna Panufnik, Hora Bessarabia Fazil Say, Cleopatra Laura Snowden, Through the Fog Eugène Ysaÿe, Sonata No. 6 in E Major, Op. 27, No. 6	Rubicon
2018	Chaconnes, Divertimento & Rhapsodies	Johann Sebastian Bach (arr. Mendelssohn), Chaconne from Partita for solo violin No. 2 in D minor BMW 1004 Tomaso Antonio Vitali (arr. Charlier), Chaconne in G minor Igor Stravinsky, Divertimento, Suite from Le Baiser de la fée Béla Bartók, Rhapsody No. 1 BB 94 Pancho Vladigerov, Bulgarian Rhapsody 'Vardar' Mario Castelnuovo-Tedesco (arr. Heifetz), Concert-Rhapsodie Figaro on Rossini's 'Largo al factotum' from Il barbiere di Siviglia	Rubicon
2017	Suites & Fantasies	Alfred Schnittke, Suite in Old Style Manuel de Falla, Suite populaire espagnole Benjamin Britten, Suite Op. 6 Darius Milhaud, Cinéma-Fantasie after Le Boeuf sur le toit, Op. 58b Igor Frolov, Concert Fantasy on Themes from Gershwin's Porgy and Bess, Op. 19	Rubicon
2016	Cantata Memoria: For the Children	Karl Jenkins, Cantata Memoria: For the Children	Deutsche Grammophon
