= Leonard Lewis (barrister) =

British Queen's Counsel and politician

Isaiah Leonard Lewis (11 May 1909 – 2 February 1994) was a British Queen's Counsel and politician.

Lewis attended Hackney Downs School, then St John's College, Cambridge, at which he was the youngest Wrangler in 30 years. He then studied at the University of London, before becoming a barrister at Middle Temple, in 1932.

A supporter of the Labour Party, Lewis was active in the Society of Labour Lawyers, and served as an alderman on Battersea Metropolitan Borough Council. At the 1935 UK general election, he stood in Reigate, taking 26% of the vote against a single opponent.

Lewis served in the Royal Air Force during World War II. After the war, he returned to law, and also stood in the 1951 UK general election in Brentford and Chiswick, taking a close second place, with 48% of the vote.

Lewis became a Queen's Counsel in 1969, and retired in 1982. His son, John Lewis, became a solicitor and businessperson.
