= Storybook Dads =

British charity for prisoners and their children

- Formation: 2003; 23 years ago (Note: Formation variously given as 2002, 2004 (BBC) and 2003 (Huffington Post and charity's own website))
- Founder: Sharon Berry
- Founded at: HMP Dartmoor
- Headquarters: HMP Channings Wood
- Location: Denbury, Devon
- Key people: Patrons: Julia Donaldson; Terry Waite
- Website: www.storybookdads.org.uk

Storybook Dads is a non-profit charity in the UK founded by Sharon Berry and first launched in HM Prison Dartmoor in 2003. The charity enables serving prisoners and detainees to record bed time stories which can then be sent home to their children, and aims to maintain connections between serving prisoners and their families. In women's institutions the project operates under the name Storybook Mums.

By 2019 the scheme was in place in about 100 British prisons, including women's prisons and has been adopted by members of the Royal Air Force and Royal Navy on active service abroad. The charity's headquarters is in HMP Channings Wood in Devon, and has inspired similar programmes in other countries, such as the United States, Canada, Australia, Denmark, Hungary, Poland and New Zealand.

== History ==
Berry began the project in 2002 while she was working at BBC Radio Devon and was visiting HMP Channings Wood to help set up a radio station within the prison with the prison's writer-in-residence. Berry then began working at HMP Dartmoor teaching further education in the prison education department where the idea grew from her working on recordings at home in her own time to setting up a registered charity. The scheme was initially difficult to set up because of restrictions on bringing recording equipment and storage cards into secure units. The project originally ran from an empty cell inside the prison but after a few years Berry and the volunteers were given an office in the prison education department which was officially opened by Princess Anne in 2007. In 2010 Berry received an OBE for services to children and families. Storybook Dads aims to engage prisoners in maintaining contact with some of the 200,000 children who are affected each year by having a parent in prison. By 2019 Storybook Dads was reported as operating in around 100 prisons and reaching 20,000 children annually, and in 2017 it was reported 5000 families benefited from a Christmas period initiative.

With the possible closure of HMP Dartmoor, in 2015 Storybook Dads moved to HMP Channings Wood with an increased staff of 18.

Patrons of Storybook Dads are children's author Julia Donaldson and humanitarian and author Terry Waite.

== Storytelling ==
The bookreading recording can be carried out by volunteers from the charity, library or education staff, members of the chaplaincy department, the Offender Management Unit or pact. Readers will read aloud from books and may use puppets or toys to animate the story. One prisoner at HMP Dartmoor explained "It’s really weird at first, sitting there reading a story to camera with a toy monkey on your shoulder.” Readings can be edited to remove mistakes or prompting help for people with reading difficulties, effects and music may also be added. Recordings were originally made on MiniDisc recorders. At HMP Channings Wood, where the charity is based, trained editors (from the prison population) then edit and convert these audio or video recordings onto CD and DVD. The recording is then sent to the child with a personal message.

Some additional elements and adaptations to the process have been locally introduced. At HMP Lowdham Grange some prisoners have used the scheme to gain accreditation in video editing to increase job opportunities on release. At HM Prison Hollesley Bay prisoner and child can use activity sheets to support the reading on subjects such as 'memories' or 'hopes' which are then converted into a book, called Me and My Dad by the prisoner.

In 2018 the Bedtime Stories programme, run by Stratford Literary Festival in conjunction with Storybook Mums and Dads, ran workshops to help inmates write stories for children which they then either sent or read and recorded to their children outside.

== Impact ==
According to statistics gathered by the Learning and Work Institute, 95% of prisoners who took part and 92% of family respondents reported that the Storybook Dads project had improved the relationship with the child. At HMP Greenock a report produced by Her Majesty's Inspectorate of Education in Scotland indicated the scheme was of a high quality and that "Positive feedback from children had increased prisoners’ self-esteem and presented them with an opportunity to reflect upon their parenting skills." Research from King's College London in 2014 identified that while caution needs to be exercised in evaluating self-reported feedback, prisoners report increased creativity and children increased well-being. However the report identified methodological flaws because evaluating its impact relies on children's feedback being provided by the home carer who may not have a positive relationship with the prisoner, and no quantitative measurements of literacy or recidivism have been made. The Me and My Dad project aims to address some of these issues but has not yet been independently evaluated. The report also identified that there were positive benefits to reengaging prisoners with the education system and the programme, being privately funded, was not subject to the problems associated with budgetary cuts and competitive tendering.

In 2012 Storybook Dads won an award for e-inclusion from the European Commission.

In 2017 Liz Truss identified Storybook Dads in a discussion at the House of Commons as part of a reading of the Prisons and Courts Bill 2016-17, stating the importance of such charities in rehabilitating offenders and preventing reoffending. The Guardian questioned whether the new bill would lead to any practical opportunities of funding for such charities or whether they would be expected to continue to make up the deficit between government proposed rehabilition strategies and the actual prisoner's experience inside.

== Awards ==
- 2005: Butler Trust award
- 2005: Home Office Justice Award, individual category, Outstanding contribution to working with offenders
- 2006: Public servant of the year award, breaking new ground category
- 2007: The Guardian Public Services award (children's services category)
- 2007: National Health and Social Care award
- 2008: Third Sector Excellence Award
- 2011: Chris Dredger for Storybook Dads, Talk Talk’s ‘Digital Heroes’ Award
- 2012: European Commission e-inclusion award
- 2014: Children and Young People CYP Now award, charity of the year
- 2016: Criminal Justice Alliance award for most inspiring organisation

== See also ==
- Koestler Trust
- Prison Advice and Care Trust (PACT)
