= Koestler Arts =

UK charity for prisoners, detainees and ex-offenders

- Named after: Arthur Koestler
- Formation: 1962; 64 years ago
- Registration no.: 1105759
- Headquarters: Koestler Arts Centre
- Location: HMP Wormwood Scrubs
- Key people: Fiona Curran, Chief Executive
- Website: www.koestlerarts.org.uk

Koestler Arts (formerly The Koestler Trust) is a charity that helps ex-offenders, secure patients and detainees in the UK to express themselves creatively. It promotes the arts in prisons, secure hospitals, immigration centres and in the community, encouraging creativity and the acquisition of new skills as a means to rehabilitation. The Koestler Awards were founded in 1962 and the organisation became a charitable trust in 1969 following a bequest from the British-Hungarian author, Arthur Koestler.

== Koestler's prison experience ==
Koestler had been detained in three jails in separate countries. In Spain, he was sentenced to death in 1936 for espionage under Francisco Franco's regime. He witnessed many executions, and was held in solitary confinement. He was arrested in France a few years later and held in the Le Vernet Internment Camp for subversion. He was released and fled to England, where he was held at Pentonville as a suspected illegal immigrant.

== Creation of the Koestler Trust ==
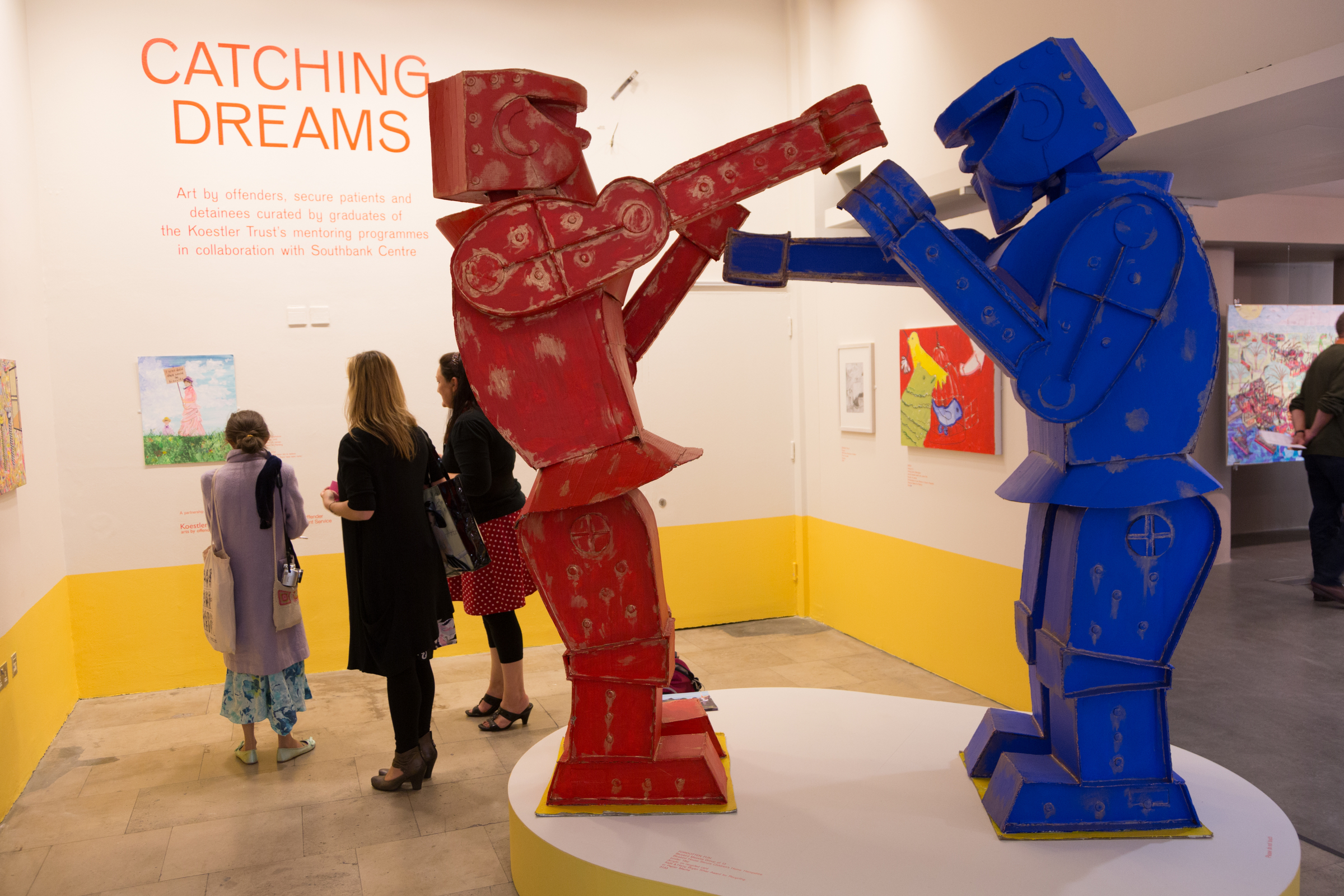
Catching Dreams-254

Koestler's experiences in prison led him to write Darkness at Noon and newspaper articles campaigning for the abolition of capital punishment in the 1950s. He also tried to change the experience of incarceration, stating that in prison, "the main problem is apathy, depression and gradual dehumanisation. The spark dies." Koestler spoke of being intellectually understimulated and terrorized in prison, and wanted to provide "an imaginative and exciting way to stimulate as far as possible and in as many cases as possible the mind and spirit of the prisoner."

In 1962, Koestler arranged the Arthur Koestler Award through the Home Office of the United Kingdom, to award monetary prizes for artistic achievement to prisoners, detainees, and psychiatric patients. Following a donation from Koestler, it became a charitable trust in 1969. Koestler gave a further bequest of £10,000 on his death. The trust became Koestler Arts in 2019.

== Koestler Arts today ==
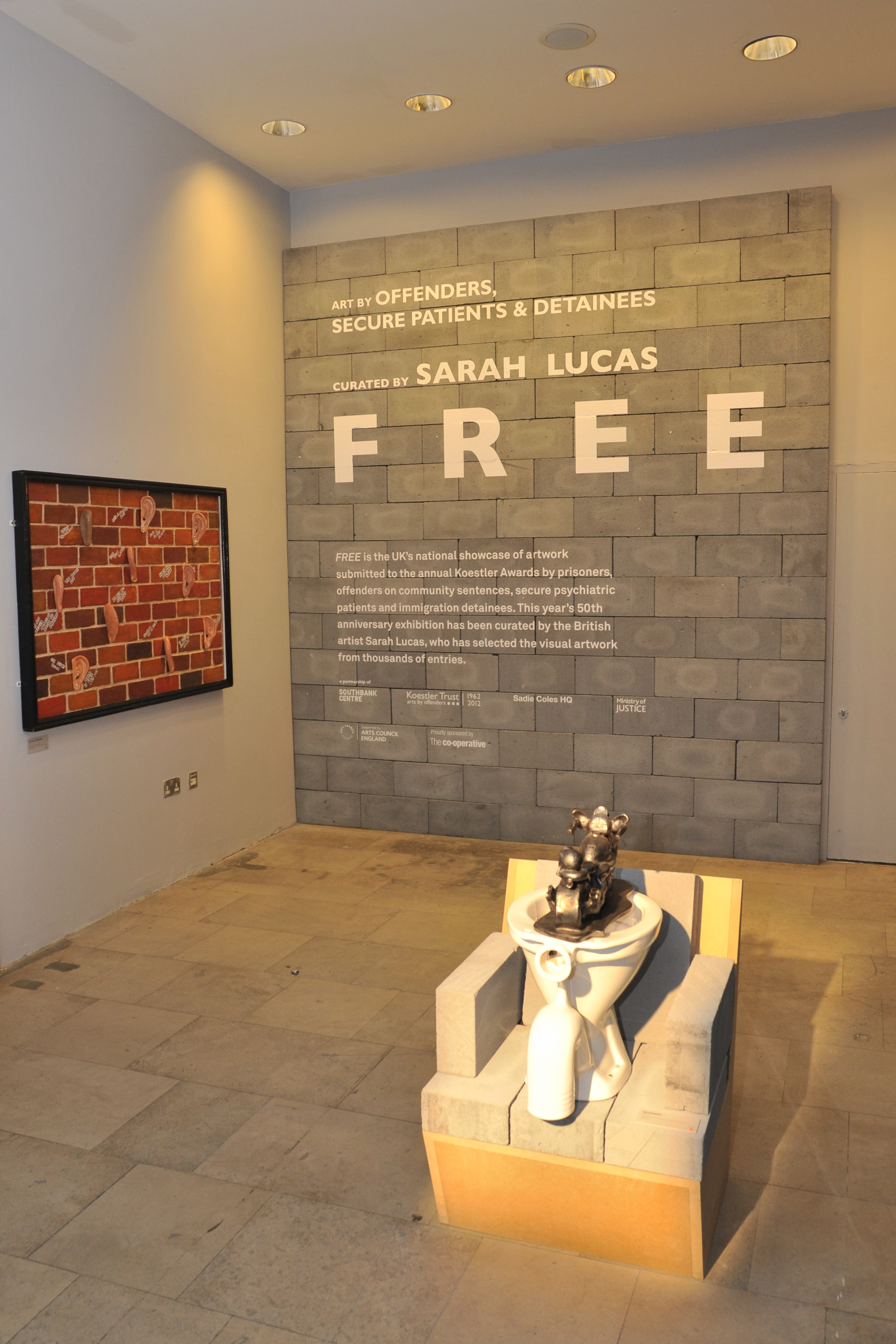
FREE, 2012 exhibition of entries to the Koestler Awards, curated by Sarah Lucas

Today the Koestler Awards cover more than 50 artforms, across music, writing, crafts, design, performance and fine art. Each category is judged by panels of experts from the art world. All entrants receive a certificate and written feedback on their work, and each category is judged by panels of experts from the art world, with prizes ranging from £25 to £100 (as of the 2018 awards). In descending order, prize tiers are usually platinum, gold, silver and bronze, with a special youth award, first-time participant, commended and highly commended awards also available.

An annual exhibition programme is curated separately and held at London's Southbank Centre. Recent curators of the UK exhibition include Grayson Perry, Sarah Lucas, Anthony Gormley, Speech Debelle and Jeremy Deller as well as victims of crime, magistrates, women prisoners and ex-prisoners. In 2017, British sculptor Anthony Gormley said,

I want to celebrate this great resource: the imaginations of the 85,000 prisoners currently in UK prisons and those in secure establishments. Art is a place in which you can do what you like; it need not be for or about anyone else but the artist. In the words of one prisoner, "in our minds we can always be free".

The charity also holds locally focused exhibitions - recent shows include Snail Porridge at Castlefield Gallery in Manchester (2014) curated by Bob and Roberta Smith, Release at Glasgow's Tramway (arts centre), curated by Kibble Secure Centre and the first exhibition in the south east of England held at Turner Contemporary gallery and curated by ex-offenders themselves. The charity has also held exhibitions as part of the annual Edinburgh Festival which involved work from people in Scottish prisons and secure units.

Koestler Arts also runs mentoring programmes for people who wish to continue in the arts after release from prison or other secure settings. Artwork by the prisoners and others is available for sale direct to the public through the trust's exhibitions, with proceeds split between the Artists (50%), Victim Support (25%) and the charity (25%). Individual donors and businesses may also sponsor an award within the Koestler judging categories.

Koestler Arts is funded by grants from the National Offender Management Service (NOMS), as part of HM Prison and Probation Service, Arts Council England and donations from many private individuals, organisations and businesses.

== Koestler Arts annual national exhibition ==
Each year the charity holds an annual award exhibition at the Southbank Centre, London, for which a themed category is suggested for prisoners to submit art works during the preceding months. In recent years the themed category has also had an independent judge and award. Submitted works are given a "K number" for purposes of exhibition and sale, the location the artwork was submitted from is publicly displayed with any title or age category, but names are removed (although first names can be added on request). Not all submissions are available for sale depending on the preference of the artist.

For the 2018 exhibition around 220 art works were exhibited at the Southbank Centre show, which included art, sculpture, creative crafts, printmaking, written and spoken word, music and film. Exhibition titles, curators and themes for recent years are listed below:

- 2011: Art by Offenders, judged by Magistrates' Association, with guidance from Grayson Perry, Emma Bridgewater and Will Self
  The theme was "help!" and the theme category was judged by journalist Jeremy Paxman
- 2012: Free, curated by artist Sarah Lucas.
  The theme was "50", to acknowledge the 50th anniversary of Koestler Trust
- 2013: The Strength and Vulnerability bunker, curated by rapper Speech Debelle.
  The theme was "forgiveness" and the theme category was judged by theatre director Jude Kelly
- 2014: Catching Dreams, curated by previous Koestler award entrants.
  The theme was "dreams" and the category awarded by Olympic athlete Katherine Grainger
- 2015: Re:Form, curated by Southbank Centre and the Koestler Trust, including Jeremy Deller, Carol Ann Duffy, Speech Debelle and Hot Chip.
  The theme was "journey" and the theme category was voted by social media followers
- 2016: We Are All Human, curated by poet Benjamin Zephaniah.
  The theme was "comfort" and the theme category was voted by social media followers
- 2017: Inside, curated by sculptor Anthony Gormley.
  The theme was "inside" and the theme category was also judged by Gormley
- 2018: I'm Still Here, curated by families who have a relative in prison
  The theme was "connections" and the theme category was judged by actor Reggie Yates
- 2019: Another Me, curated by Soweto Kinch.

== See also ==
- Fine Cell Work
- Howard League for Penal Reform
- Prison Advice and Care Trust (PACT)
- Prison Radio Association
- Storybook Dads
