= Magna Carta (An Embroidery) =

2015 embroidery artwork by Cornelia Parker

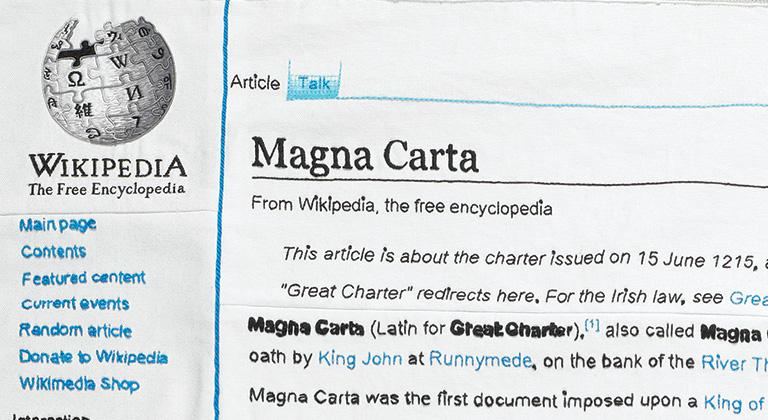
- Detail of the top left of Magna Carta (An Embroidery)
- Artist: Cornelia Parker
- Year: 2015
- Type: Embroidery
- Subject: The Magna Carta English Wikipedia article as of 15 June 2014
- Dimensions: 1.5 m × 13 m (4.9 ft × 43 ft)

Documentary film on the making of Magna Carta (An Embroidery)

Magna Carta (An Embroidery) is a 2015 work by English installation artist Cornelia Parker. It is an embroidered representation of the complete text and images of an online encyclopedia article for Magna Carta, as it appeared on the English Wikipedia on 15 June 2014, the 799th anniversary of the document.

== Execution ==
The hand-stitched embroidery is 1.5 metres (4.9 ft) wide and nearly 13 metres (43 ft) long. It is a response to the legacy of Magna Carta in the digital era and Parker has referred to it as "a snapshot of where the debate is right now", the result of all open edits by English Wikipedians up to that date. It was commissioned by the Ruskin School of Art at the University of Oxford in partnership with the British Library, after being chosen from proposals from a shortlist of artists in February 2014.

Parker used a screenshot from the 15 June 2014 English Wikipedia article for Magna Carta and printed it onto fabric. Like English Wikipedia, the embroidery was created through the collaboration of many individuals. It was divided in 87 sections and sent to 200 individuals who each hand-stitched portions of the artwork. She sought the collaboration of people and groups that have been affected by and associated with Magna Carta. The majority of the text was sewn by prisoners. Members of the Embroiderers' Guild stitched the images, with at least one embroiderer selected from each region of the UK. Many celebrities and public figures also contributed, stitching phrases or words of special significance to them. Parker has represented the work as "Echoing the communal activity that resulted in the Bayeux Tapestry, but on this occasion placing more emphasis on the word rather than the image, I wanted to create an artwork that is a contemporary interpretation of Magna Carta."

The work includes a tea stain from a prisoner and a spot of blood from Guardian editor Alan Rusbridger, who accidentally pricked his finger while sewing.

== Embroiderers ==
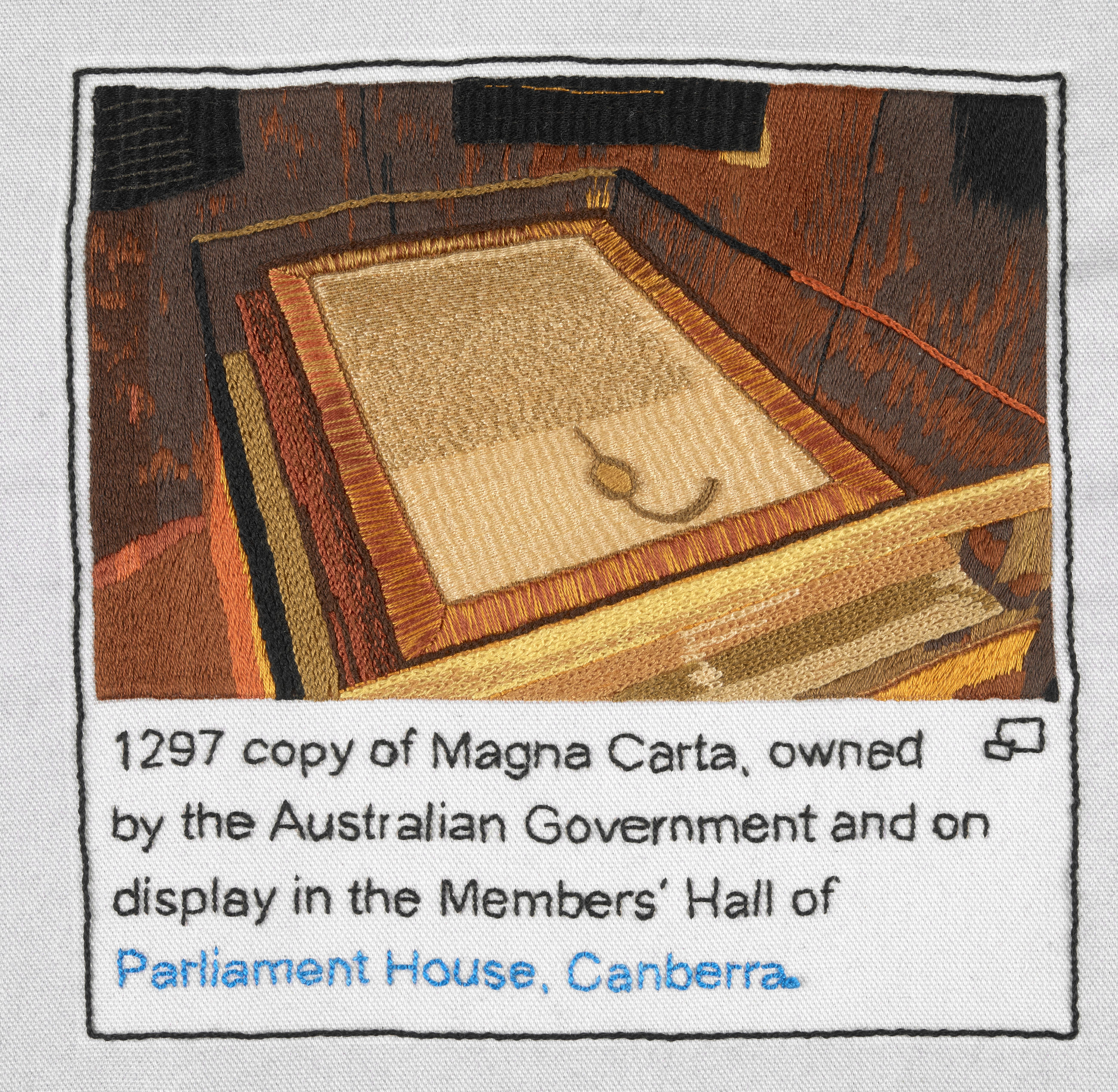
Detail of the work reproducing an image of the 1297 copy of Magna Carta on display in the Members' Hall of Parliament House, Canberra, Australia

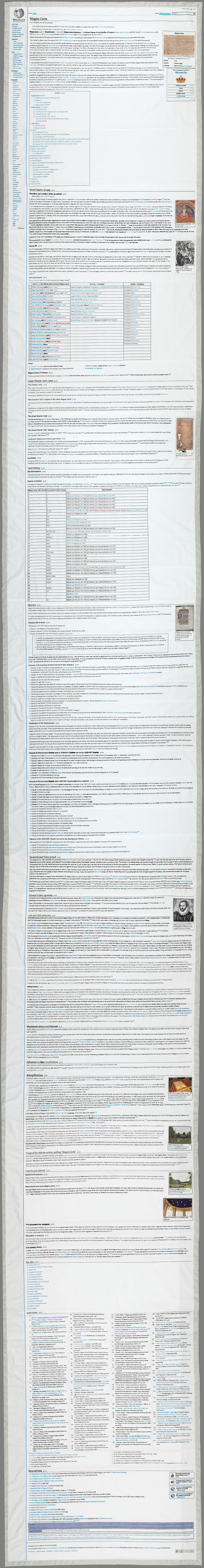
The entire embroidery

Parker invited some 200 people to hand-stitch portions of the work including prison inmates, civil rights campaigners, MPs, lawyers, barons and artists. Much of the work was done by 36 prisoners from 13 different prisons in England, under the supervision of the social enterprise Fine Cell Work. Members of the Embroiderers' Guild contributed the images as did students from the Royal School of Needlework and the London embroidery company Hand & Lock.

Six students from La Retraite Roman Catholic Girls' School, London were the youngest contributors to the work.

Parker invited royalty to contribute to the work, but they declined. She said that right-wing people were more likely to decline; both Gordon Brown and Alex Salmond also declined to contribute.

List of contributors

- Julian Assange – "freedom"
- Mary Beard
- Shami Chakrabarti – "Charter of Liberties"
- Kenneth Clarke
- Jarvis Cocker – "common people" for the song of the same name
- Brian Eno – "in perpetuity"
- Anthea Godfrey (Embroiderers' Guild) – image of Pope Innocent III
- Antony Gormley
- Germaine Greer
- Igor Judge, Baron Judge and Lady Judith Judge – "Habeas Corpus"
- Christopher Le Brun – "folio"
- Doreen Lawrence, Baroness Lawrence of Clarendon – "justice", "denial" and "delay"
- Caroline Lucas
- Eliza Manningham-Buller – "freedom"
- James McNeill QC – "Eden"
- Caitlin Moran
- Cornelia Parker – "prerogative"
- Janet Payne (Embroiderers' Guild) – image of John of England signing Magna Carta
- Philip Pullman – "Oxford"
- Alan Rusbridger – "contemporary political relevance"
- Edward Snowden – "liberty"
- Clive Stafford Smith – stitched his contribution while visiting a client at the Guantanamo Bay detention camp
- Peter Tatchell – "democracy" (shared with Parker)
- Jimmy Wales – "user's manual"
- Sayeeda Warsi, Baroness Warsi – "freedom"
- Baroness Shirley Williams
- Students from La Retraite Roman Catholic Girls' School – "Salisbury Cathedral", "Durham Cathedral", "South Africa" and "Australia"

== Display ==
Magna Carta (An Embroidery) formed part of an exhibition celebrating the 800th anniversary of Magna Carta. It was displayed in the Entrance Hall of the British Library from 15 May to 24 July 2015, at the Whitworth Art Gallery, Manchester, August – November 2016, and in the Blackwell Hall of the Bodleian Library, Oxford, 11 November 2015 – 3 January 2016, touring other United Kingdom locations in the rest of 2016 and 2017. In 2022 it was exhibited at Tate Britain as part of an exhibition of Cornelia Parker's work. From 15 May to 17 September 2023 it was displayed as part of the exhibition To Be Free: Art and Liberty at Salisbury Cathedral.
