= Higher Wincombe =

Hamlet in Wiltshire, England

Coordinates: 51°00′53″N 2°10′45″W

Higher Wincombe is a farm and small hamlet in the parish of Donhead St Mary, Wiltshire, England. It lies at the transition point between the plateau of Shaftesbury and the head of the Nadder Valley, just beyond the north-east edge of the town of Shaftesbury, Dorset, and within the Cranborne Chase and West Wiltshire Downs National Landscape.

== History ==
There was a hamlet called Wincombe by the later 18th century, which was recorded as Higher Wincombe when it was surveyed by the Ordnance Survey in 1886. Wincombe farm was built in the second half of the 18th century (although the barn may have been built in the earlier part of that century) and was enlarged in the 19th century.

The properties of the hamlet were subject to a number of name changes between 1990 and 1992 with Higher Wincombe Farm Cottages being converted into one property and renamed Higher Wincombe Farm, the farmhouse as was being renamed Higher Wincombe House, the annex to the farmhouse, which was also known as the Barn House, being renamed Old Wincombe Farm, and lastly the barn being converted into residential use and named Old Wincombe Barn.

Over the years, the lanes to the east which joined Higher Wincombe to Donhead St Mary and other hamlets in the parish have been downgraded to bridleways. The hamlet is now only accessible via Wincombe Lane – a private road and bridleway – from Shaftesbury. The lane had an avenue of beech trees, established for over 200 years, until they were felled in the 1970s.

== Military sites ==
Part of the land of Higher Wincombe Farm, shouldering the border with Dorset, was requisitioned in 1943 by the Ministry of Works for the war effort and became the Wincombe Y Station which was at first operated by the General Post Office (GPO). Prior to this there was an RAF Home Defence Unit (HDU) operating on the land, under the control of 26 Group No.363 Wireless Unit, West Kingsdown. RAF Home Defence Units were the cover name for RAF Y Service. HDUs dealt primarily with intercepting Luftwaffe aircraft VHF voice communications, primarily in fighters. It is likely that this HDU became obsolete as Luftwaffe traffic inland decreased after the Battle of Britain.

Harold Charles Kenworthy (1892–1987), the head of Government Communications Wireless Station (GCWS) at Knockholt in Kent, reported that in July 1943 it became necessary to consider the expansion of the Foreign Office Y Service to monitor Japanese and German Morse signals. Tests were undertaken at several locations with the observations favouring Wincombe. In addition, observations were noted relating to German non-Morse traffic known as Tunny. Equipment was specially made and taken to Wincombe, where control and circuit lines were connected through to Knockholt. Initially, staff occupied ex-RAF huts and continued to do so until the main building was completed in the early part of 1944, when a special section was taken over and better gear installed, together with a four-channel V/F to Knockholt.

The original location of the Y station was immediately east of the farmyard at the edge of the ancient woodland known as The Great Hanging; the site was captured by Ordnance Survey aerial photography in 1945. It was later moved south on the farmland into more substantial buildings, some of them still standing and in use by a commercial creamery. In 1950, plans were submitted for a purpose-built wireless array by the Ministry of Works and discussed by the Mere and Tisbury Rural District Council, who raised no objection. A report of the meeting also noted that the Ministry would be purchasing the balance of Higher Wincombe Farm, which they felt would be uneconomical for farming.

From the 1950s to 1983 the site was operated by the National Security Agency (NSA) of the United States in conjunction with GCHQ. The site was also known as RAF Wincombe, and for a time came under RAF Upper Heyford as part of the United States Air Force in the United Kingdom. The USAF designated Higher Wincombe as a Radio Beacon Site; it was also known as Operating Location-J (OL-J) of the European Communications Area and housed Detachment 4. After the closure of operations in 1977, the decommissioning of the site took a number of years with the site's last elements being handed over in July 1983. The hamlet's properties had been returned to private residences in 1980. During the decommissioning of the site, Shaftesbury Town Council wrote to RAF Croughton in April 1982 regarding the non-functional red light on the radio mast. Their concerns remained unanswered, and in October 1982 they resolved to take the matter up with the Property Services Agency as the mast was only a short flight from Compton Abbas Airfield.
