= Sharon Berry =

British charity founder

Sharon Berry OBE is the founder and CEO of Storybook Dads, a nonprofit charity based in the UK.
