= Lady Anne Tree =

British philanthropist (1927-2010)

- Born: Lady Anne Evelyn Beatrice Cavendish; 6 November 1927; Belgravia, London, England
- Died: 9 August 2010 (aged 82); Compton Abbas, Dorset, England
- Occupations: Philanthropist, prison visitor, prisoner rights activist
- Known for: Founder of the charity Fine Cell Work
- Spouse: Michael Lambert Tree (m. 1949; died 1999)
- Children: 2, including Isabella
- Parent(s): Edward Cavendish, 10th Duke of Devonshire; Lady Mary Gascoyne-Cecil
- Relatives: William Cavendish, Marquess of Hartington (brother); Andrew Cavendish, 11th Duke of Devonshire (brother); Lady Mary Cavendish (sister); Lady Elizabeth Cavendish (sister); James Gascoyne-Cecil, 4th Marquess of Salisbury (grandfather); Ronald Tree (father-in-law); Nancy Lancaster (mother-in-law); Kathleen Kennedy Cavendish (sister-in-law); Deborah Mitford (sister-in-law)

Lady Anne Evelyn Beatrice Tree (née Cavendish; 6 November 1927 – 9 August 2010) was a British philanthropist, prison visitor, and prisoner rights activist. In 1995 she founded the charity Fine Cell Work, which gives prisoners the opportunity to do worthwhile work and acquire job skills for their life after prison.

== Early life ==
She was born Lady Anne Evelyn Beatrice Cavendish on 6 November 1927 at 2 Upper Belgrave Street, London, the fourth child of Edward Cavendish, 10th Duke of Devonshire (1895–1950), and his wife, Lady Mary Gascoyne-Cecil (1895–1988), granddaughter of Prime Minister Robert Gascoyne-Cecil, 3rd Marquess of Salisbury.

== Career ==
She first wanted to be a prison visitor at the age of 14, and took up this role from 1949 until 1974, although she struggled at first to gain access to women's prisons, so resorted to extensive letter writing and using her wide network of friends and relations. One of the prisoners she regularly visited was the murderer Myra Hindley, whom she introduced to Lord Longford; he later argued for her release.

Lady Anne became very aware of how boring and pointless life in prison could seem, and in 1995 founded the charity Fine Cell Work, which gives men and women in prison the opportunity to create intricately detailed cushion covers, wall hangings and rugs. She was keen on embroidery and needlework herself, and was confident that men would enjoy it too. The designs are created by leading fashion designers, and the skilled work can be rewarding, and may lead to paid work on release.

== Personal life ==
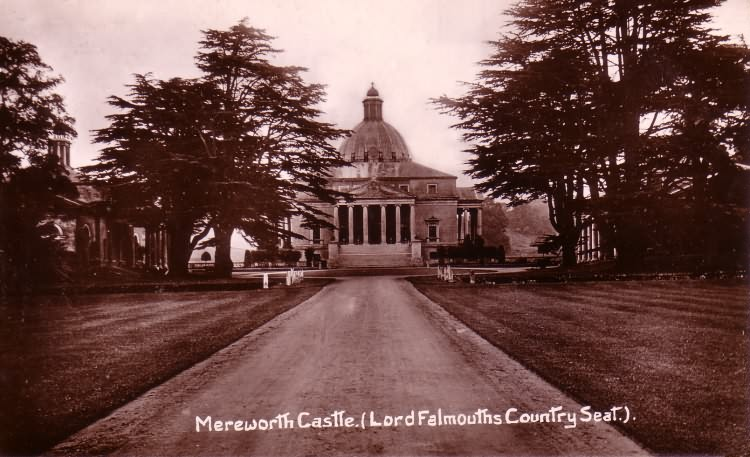
Mereworth Castle, a postcard sent in 1911

On 3 November 1949, she married the artist Michael Lambert Tree (1921–1999), son of the politician Ronald Tree and his wife Nancy Lancaster, a partner in the furnishings company Colefax and Fowler. They had two adopted daughters, including the writer and activist for rewilding the English landscape, Isabella Tree.

After the death of his uncle, Peter Beatty, on 26 October 1949, Tree inherited Mereworth Castle, Kent, where they lived subsequently. In 1968 the Trees bought Shute House, near Shaftesbury in Dorset, where they commissioned Geoffrey Jellicoe to design a notable garden.

== Later life ==
On 9 August 2010, she died of lung cancer at her home, Lower Lane House in Compton Abbas, Dorset.
