= Donhead St Mary =

Village in Wiltshire, England

Coordinates: 51.019°N 2.134°W

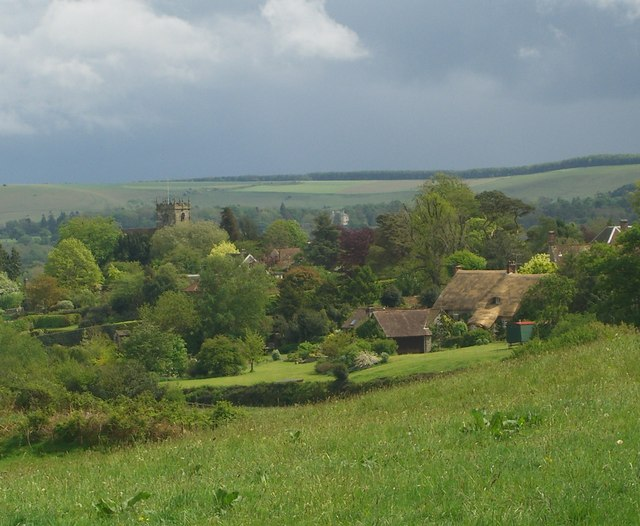

- Location within Wiltshire
- Population: 1,155 (in 2011)
- OS grid reference: ST907244
- Civil parish: Donhead St Mary
- Unitary authority: Wiltshire
- Ceremonial county: Wiltshire
- Region: South West
- Country: England
- Sovereign state: United Kingdom
- Post town: Shaftesbury
- Postcode district: SP7
- Dialling code: 01747
- Police: Wiltshire
- Fire: Dorset and Wiltshire
- Ambulance: South Western
- UK Parliament: Salisbury
- Website: Parish Council

Donhead St Mary is a village and civil parish in southwest Wiltshire, England, on the county border with Dorset. The village lies about 2 1/2 miles (4.0 km) east of the Dorset town of Shaftesbury and stands on high ground above the River Nadder, which rises in the parish.

In the south of the parish, on the A30 Salisbury-Shaftesbury road, are the village of Ludwell and its neighbouring hamlet of Birdbush; Charlton hamlet is south of the road. To the north are the hamlets of Coombe, comprising Higher Coombe, Middle Coombe and Lower Coombe. In the north-west of the parish, near Shaftesbury, is the hamlet of Higher Wincombe.

== History ==
Castle Rings, an Iron Age hillfort, is in the far north of the parish. A Roman road between Bath and Badbury Rings ran north–south through the parish, past the future sites of St Mary's church and Ludwell village.

Donhead St Mary and its neighbour Donhead St Andrew were once part of a single Donhead estate which belonged to Shaftesbury Abbey. In the 11th century the boundary between the two parishes was drawn, and in the 12th century each had a church.

Donhead Hall, a Grade II* listed country house south of the village, was built in 1724 for Godfrey Huckle (later Kneller; died 1781), a grandson of the portrait painter Sir Godfrey Kneller. The Baroque curves of its design are similar to those of Thomas Archer's Chettle House, not far away in Dorset.

In 1842 a National School was built close to St John's church, replacing an earlier school; it closed in 1876 after the opening of a new school at Ludwell, which continues in use as Ludwell Community Primary School.

In 1875 another National School was built near St Mary's Church, replacing an earlier school of 1840. This school closed in 1922 and its pupils transferred to Ludwell. The building became the village hall.

In 1945 a private Roman Catholic day and boarding school for girls, known as St Mary's School, Shaftesbury, opened at Coombe House, Higher Coombe. It closed in 2020.

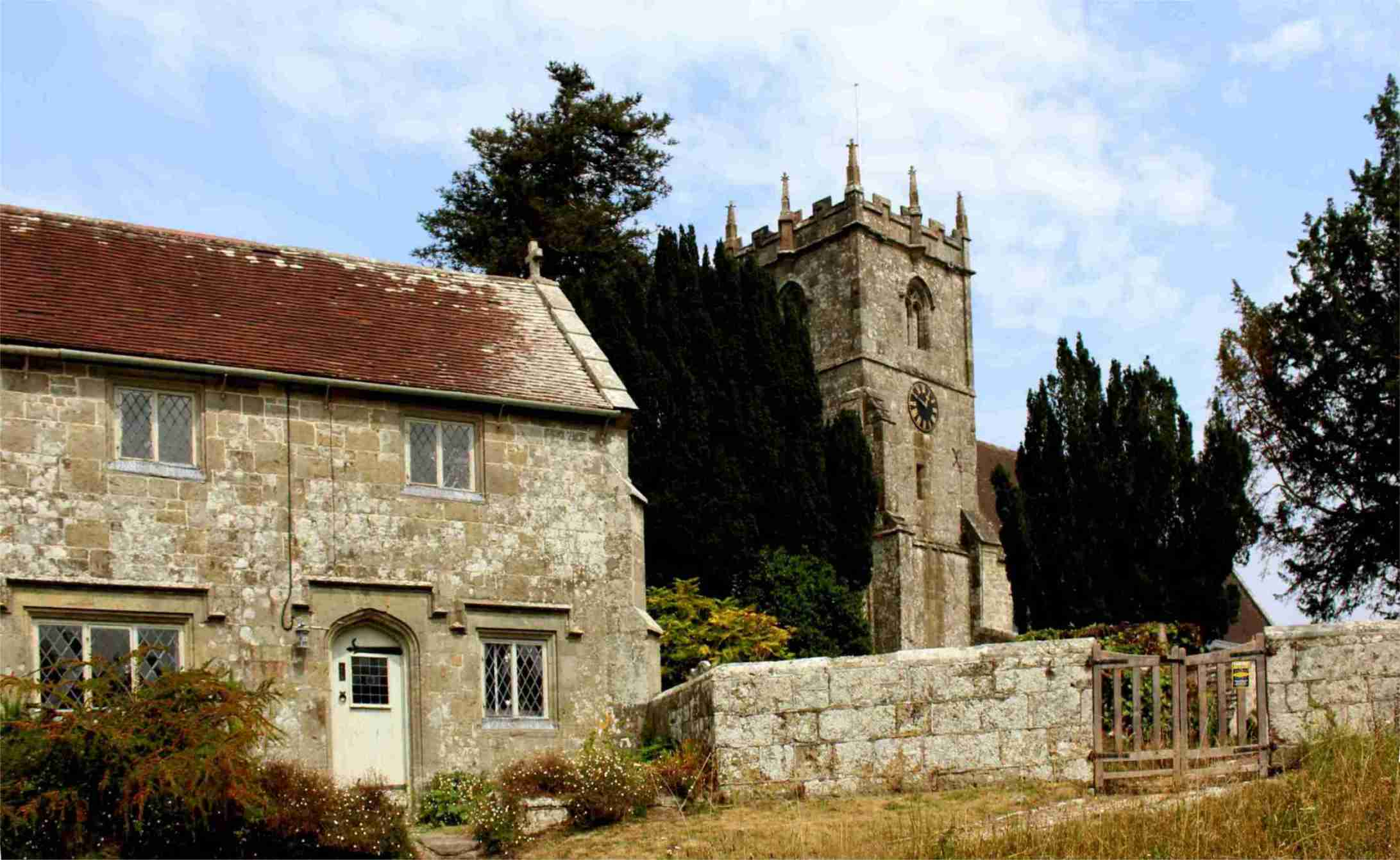
St Mary's church Donhead, from the SW taken from the village road

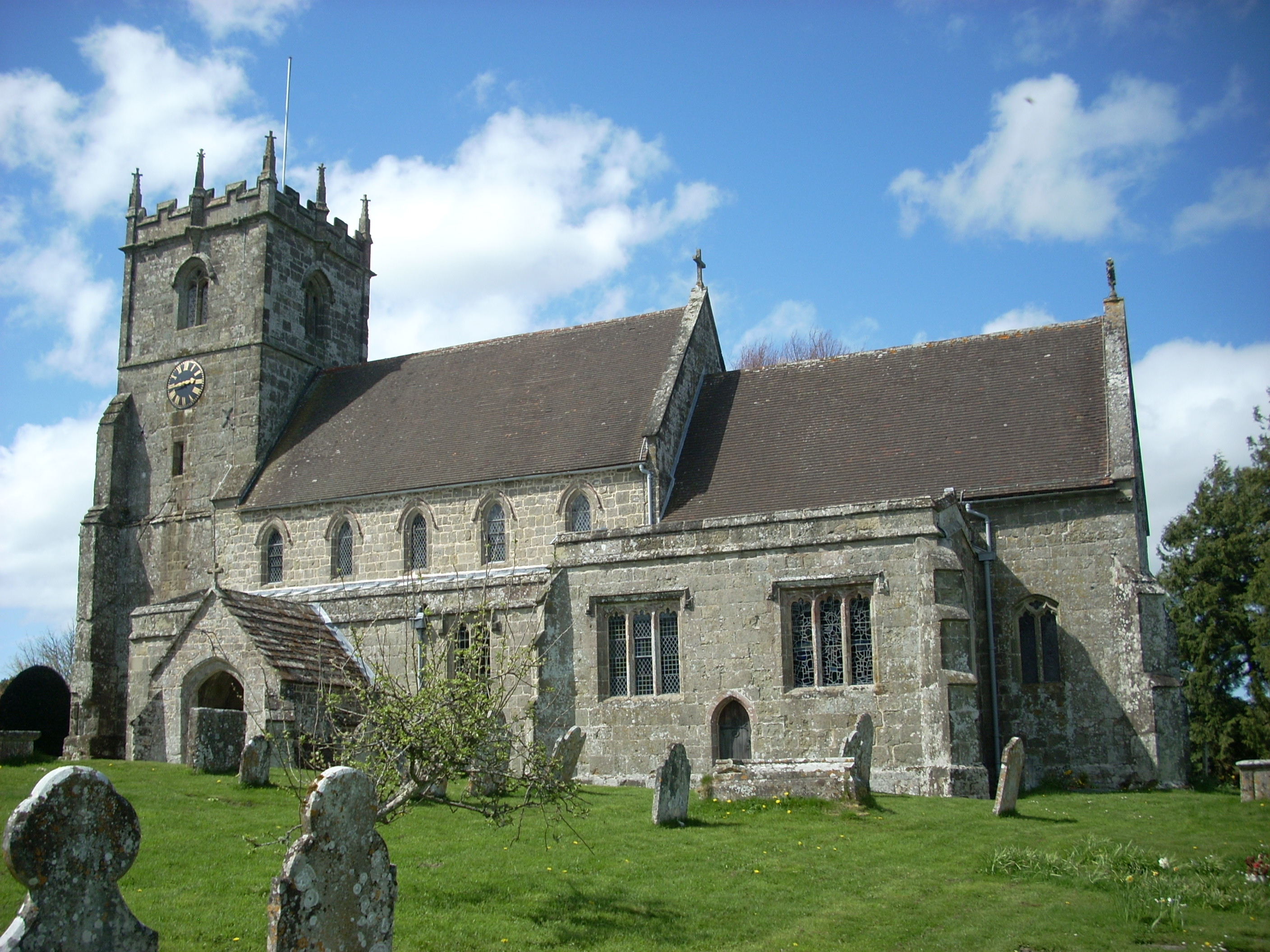
St Mary's Church, Donhead, from the graveyard

== Religious sites ==
=== Parish church ===
In the 12th century the Church of England parish church of St Mary the Virgin was small and without aisles. Later in that century the south aisle was added, and in the 13th the nave gained a clerestory. In the 14th century the south porch was added, and most of the tower is from the 15th century. In 1966 the church was designated as Grade I listed. In 1980 the benefice was united with Donhead St Andrew and Charlton; today the parish is part of the Benefice of St Bartholomew.

The former rectory, now named Shute House, is a Grade II listed building. The gardens surrounding the house were designed by Geoffrey Jellicoe and are Grade II* listed on the Historic England's Register of Historic Parks and Gardens.

=== Others ===
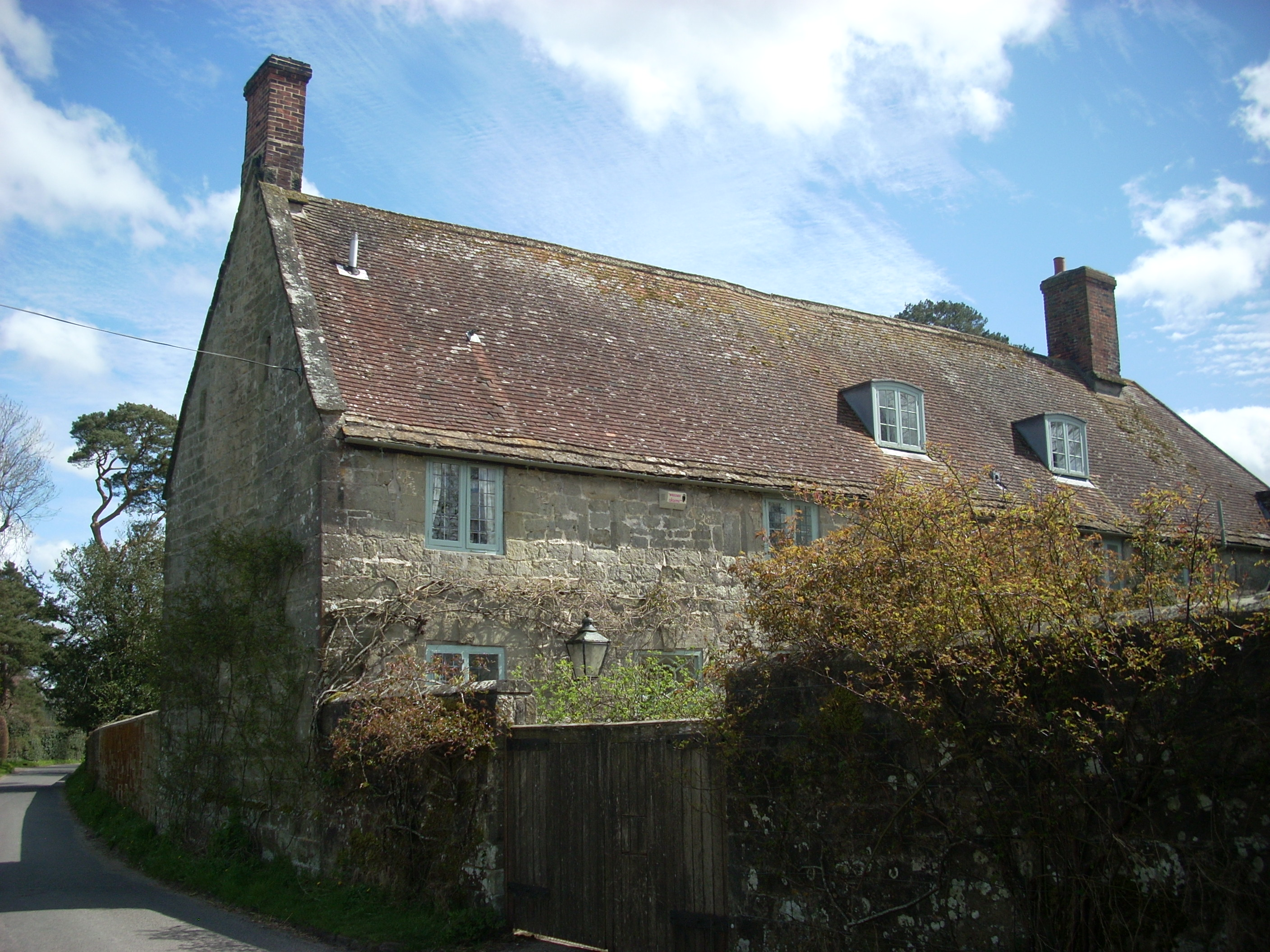
Shute House, the former rectory

There was a chapel at Charlton from the 14th century. In 1839 it was replaced by the church of St John the Baptist, built near the main road to be accessible from Ludwell and the Coombes. The church is in Neo-Norman style with a two-tower west facade.

A Wesleyan Methodist church was built in the south of Donhead St Mary village in 1837, and rebuilt in 1868. This was part of the Shaftesbury and Gillingham Wesleyan Methodist Circuit, and later the North Dorset Circuit. The church closed in 2007 and is now a private home. Primitive Methodists built a chapel at Ludwell in or before 1861, which closed c. 1965.

== Local government ==
Donhead St Mary is a civil parish with an elected parish council. It is in the area of the Wiltshire Council unitary authority, responsible for most significant local government functions.
