= Castle Rings, Wiltshire =

Iron Age hillfort in Wiltshire, England

Castle Rings
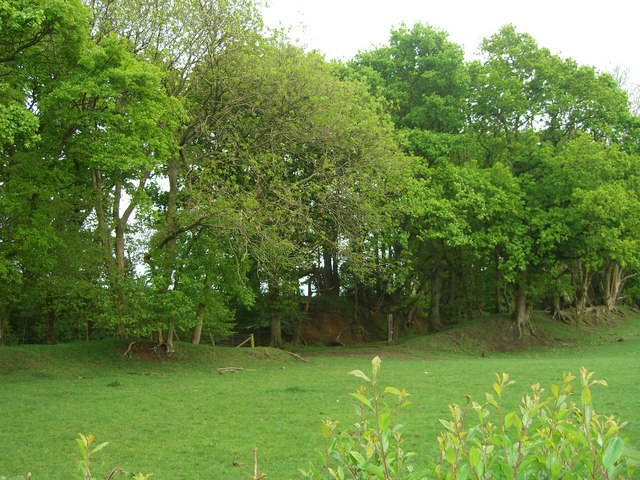
- Ditch and rampart of Castle Rings

- Location within Wiltshire

General information
- Architectural style: Iron Age hill fort
- Location: Donhead St Mary, England
- Coordinates: 51.025046°N 2.160424°W

Technical details
- Size: 12.8 acres (5.2 ha)

Castle Rings is a univallate hill fort in the parish of Donhead St Mary in Wiltshire, England. The site is a Scheduled Ancient Monument. Castle Rings has been dated to the Iron Age and is at an altitude of 228 metres (748 ft) upon Upper Greensand sandstone beds. The bulk of the fort enclosure lies within the boundaries of Donhead St Mary parish but some of the outlying earthworks are in the neighbouring Sedgehill and Semley parish. In the mid-1980s a metal detectorist unearthed a hoard of stater coins of the Durotriges tribe within the hill fort.

Lady Theodora Grosvenor described the fort in her 1867 book Motcombe, Past and Present:

...a fine encampment, enclosing a space of about 12 acres, and considered to have been originally British, which exists within the angle where the roads from Semley Church and Donhead to Shaftesbury unite by Wincombe Lodge. It bears the name of Castle Rings, and its embankments and ditches are strongly defined, though, from being overgrown with copse-wood, seldom observed.

— Lady Theodora Grosvenor, Motcombe, Past and Present 1867, pp. 78-79

== Physical characteristics ==
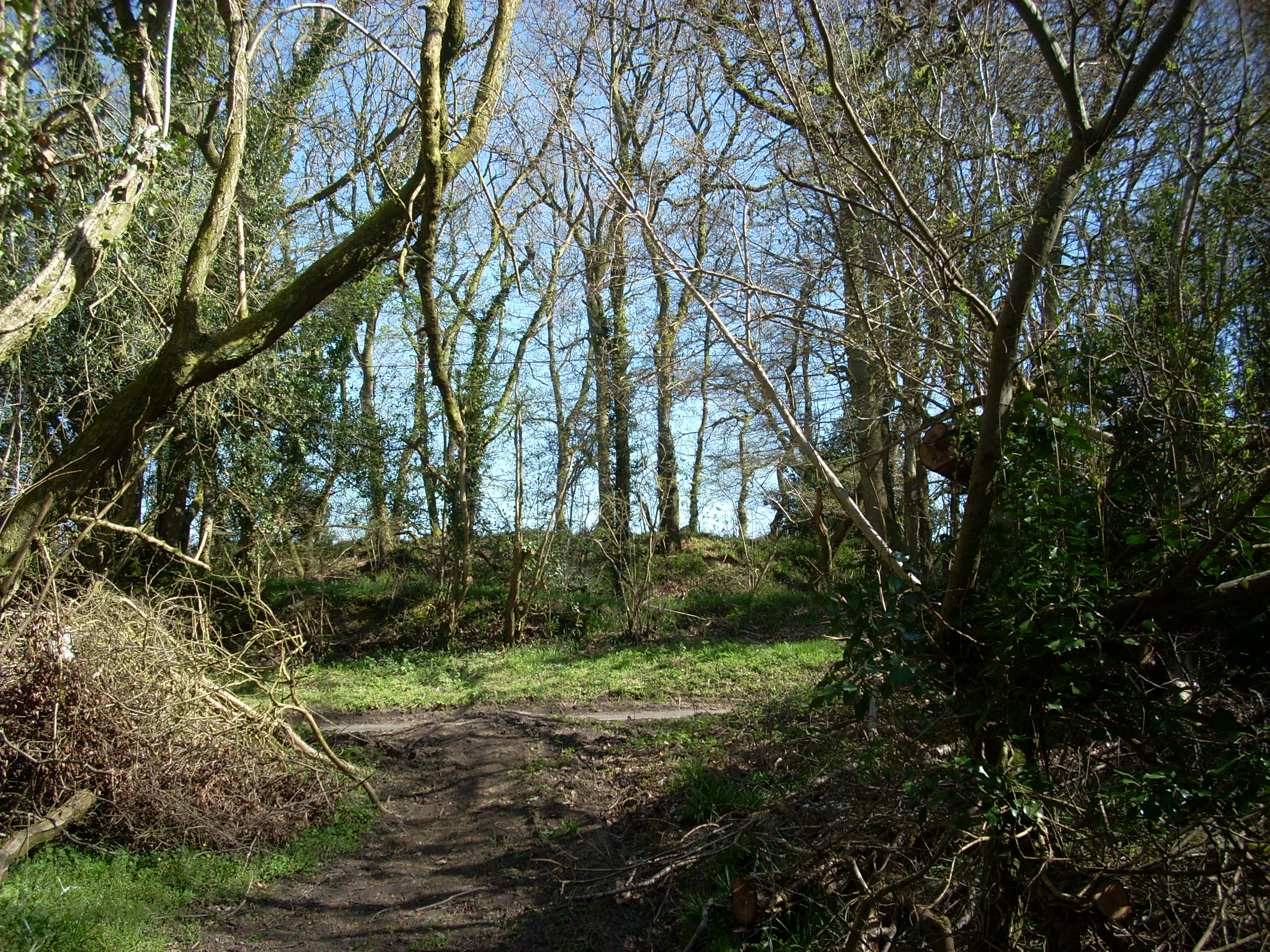
Exterior of rampart on the north side

The rampart of the fort stands 2.8 metres (9.2 ft) high with a 0.4-metre (1.3 ft) deep ditch; the ditch is set between double earth banks. The ditch averages 16 metres (52 ft) wide and varies in depth to a maximum of 4.4 metres (14 ft). The inner rampart has an average width of 8 metres (26 ft) and stands 1.9 metres (6.2 ft) above the internal surface level of the fort.

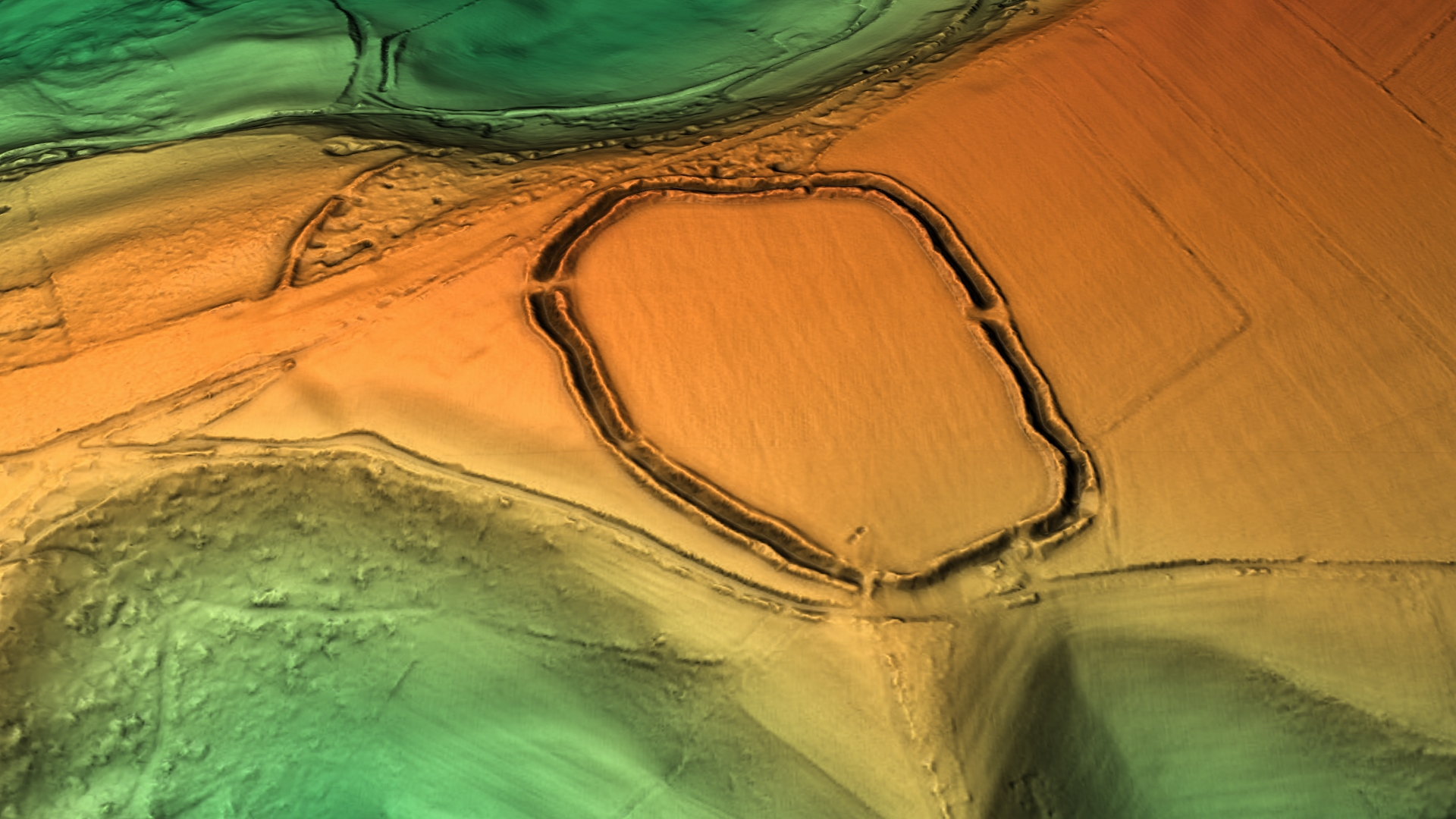
3D view of the digital terrain model

The fort measures 320 by 200 metres (1,050 by 660 ft) (NS by EW), enclosing an area of 5.2 hectares (12.8 acres). There is a counter-scarp bank that averages 5 metres (16 ft) wide and varies in height from 3.1 metres (10 ft) at the southwest to between 0.8 and 1.5 metres (2.6 and 4.9 ft) at the northeast; at the southwest this bank is high enough to give the impression of a bivallate fort. There are four gaps in the ramparts, one in each of the cardinal directions, but it is not known if these were original entrances to the fort. The east and west gaps are suspected of being the original entrances while the narrower gaps on the north and south sides are thought to be modern field entrances. The roughly oval rampart of the fort is overgrown with trees and bushes. The interior of Castle Rings is flat and used for pasture; there is no visible evidence of Iron Age occupation.

=== Western outlier ===
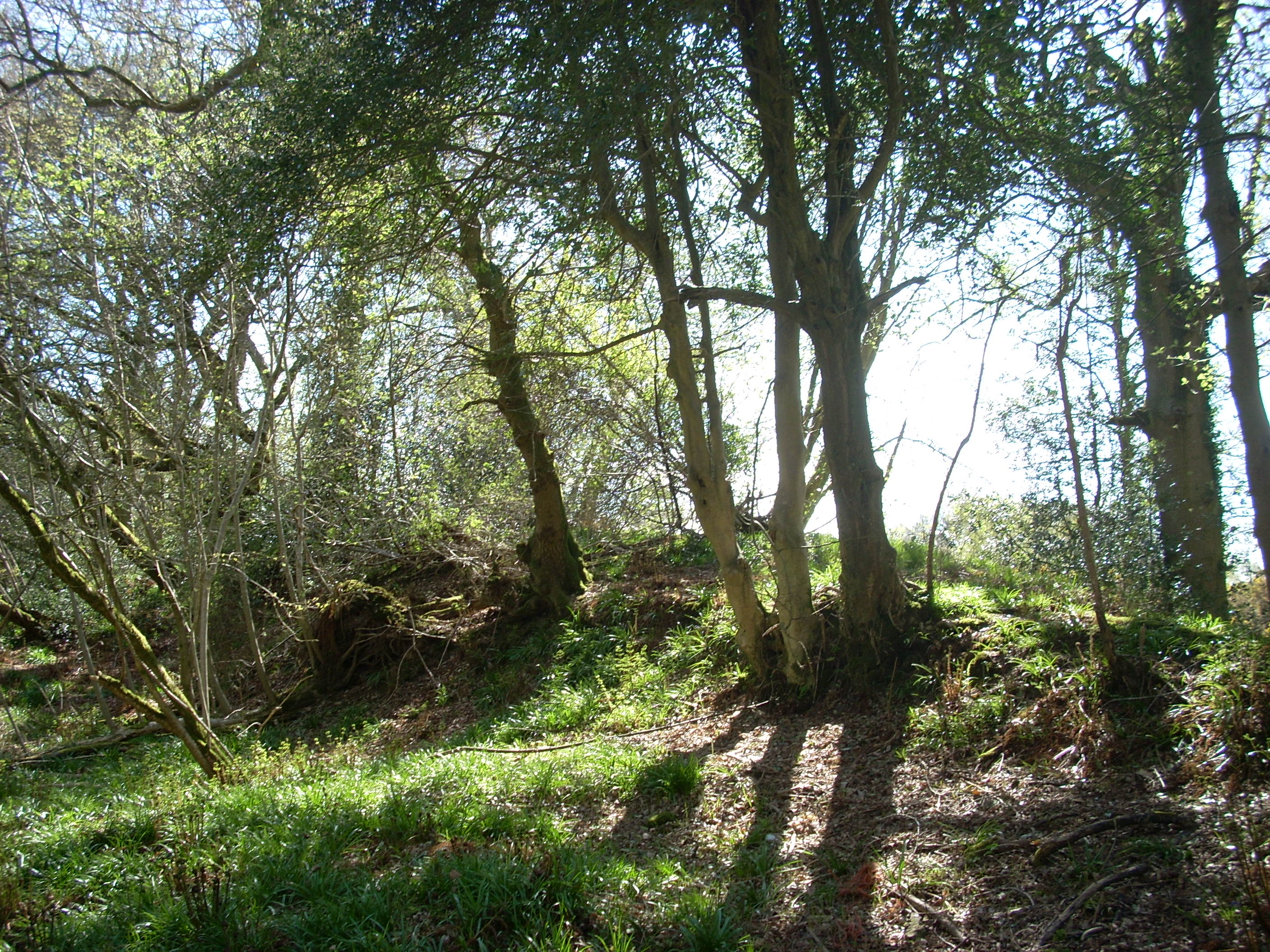
Outlying earthwork in Crates Wood

An outlying earthwork lies approximately 150 metres (490 ft) to the west of the main rampart; it crosses the ridge in a north–south direction, ending at natural scarp slopes in both directions. It extends in a curve for 340 metres (1,120 ft), running almost parallel to the rampart of the fort.

The outlier extends across fields but is more clearly marked towards the north end within Crates Wood where it reaches a maximum height of 2.8 metres (9.2 ft), with a 0.4-metre (1.3 ft) deep ditch on its west side. The bank is up to 6 metres (20 ft) wide and the ditch measures 3 to 5 metres (9.8 to 16.4 ft) wide. On its east side the earthwork's scarp stands 1.8 metres (5.9 ft) high and forms a field boundary. At the south end where it crosses fields the bank is much reduced by ploughing, with a maximum height of 0.6 metres (2.0 ft) and traces of a ploughed-out ditch.

== Coin find ==
A metal detectorist recovered a hoard of stater coins from within Castle Rings and was subsequently fined for looting a Scheduled Ancient Monument. The coins, which are attributed to the Durotriges, are now in the collection of the British Museum. They were dug up on 13 October 1985 with twelve ceramic fragments; 88 coins were found in all, some 30 of these were said to be contained within the broken pottery. The finds were handed over to the police and on 17 February 1987 were declared treasure trove by an inquest, which found that the metal detectorist had excavated a 30-centimetre (1 ft) deep hole into the upper section of the outer bank and therefore the find fell within the bounds of the scheduled monument. The finder was prosecuted under the Ancient Monuments and Archaeological Areas Act 1979; he was found guilty and fined £100 (equivalent to £355 in modern currency). The find was offered for sale to the Salisbury and South Wiltshire Museum, which refused the purchase on the grounds that it neither wished to financially reward a looter nor acquire looted artefacts. In the event, the British Museum paid the finder an amount considerably greater than the fine in order to acquire the hoard and prevent it being returned to the finder; it held that the academic value of the collected hoard outweighed the concerns regarding its acquisition.

The ceramic fragments formed a small necked beaker manufactured on a potter's wheel some time after AD 80 and is of a Roman type dated to after AD 200. The pottery also contained highly corroded remnants of bronze, copper and silver. The coins have been dated to between 60 and 20 BC; there is therefore a mismatch between the late date of the pottery and the pre-Roman coins found within it. It has been suggested that the vessel originally contained a small hoard of mixed metal artefacts but how the Iron Age Durotrigian coins ended up in the Romano-British hoard cannot be explained.

== Notes ==
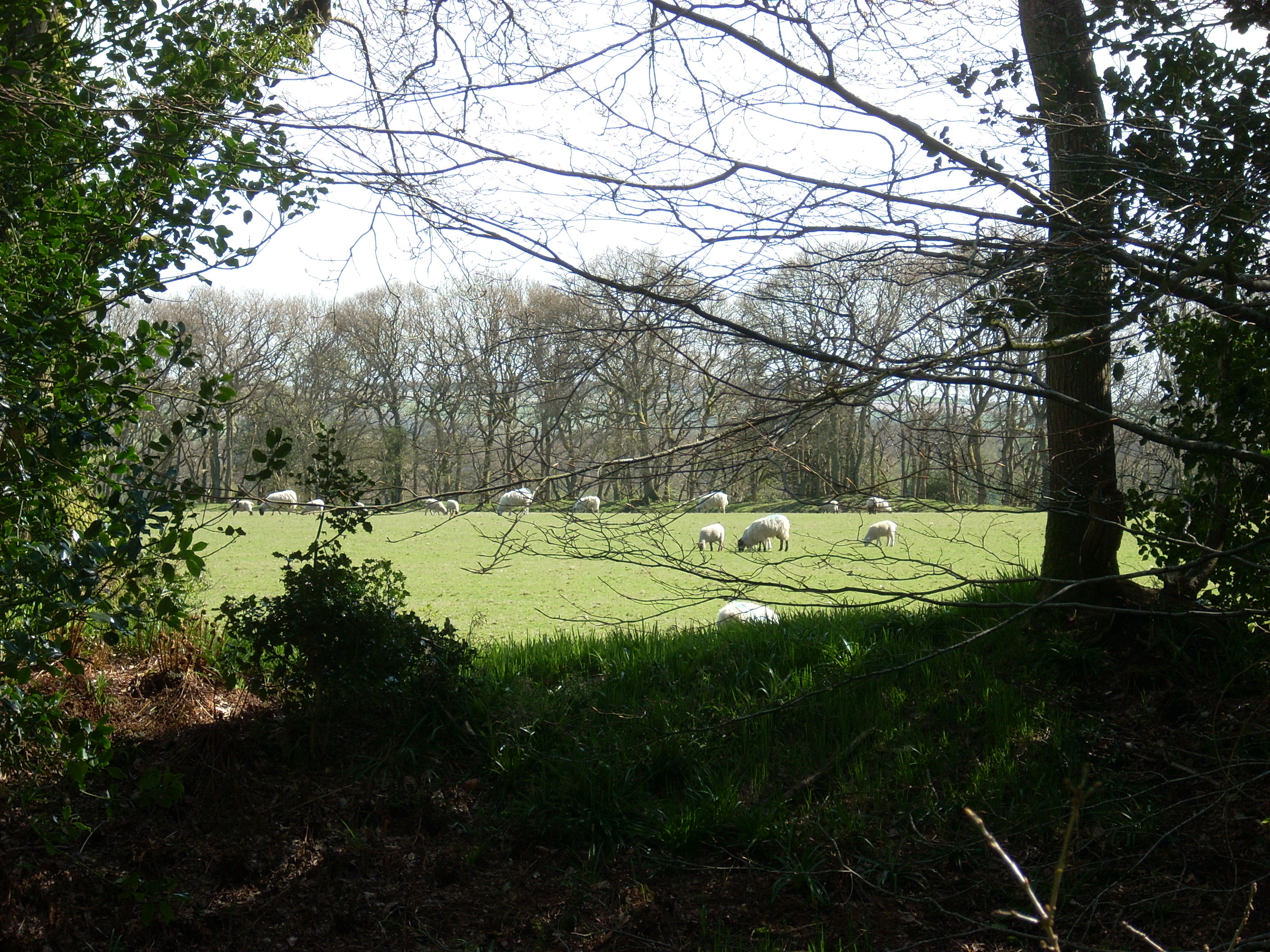
View across the interior of Castle Rings from the north rampart to the south
