= Cornelia Parker =

British artist (born 1956)

Cornelia Parker CBE RA
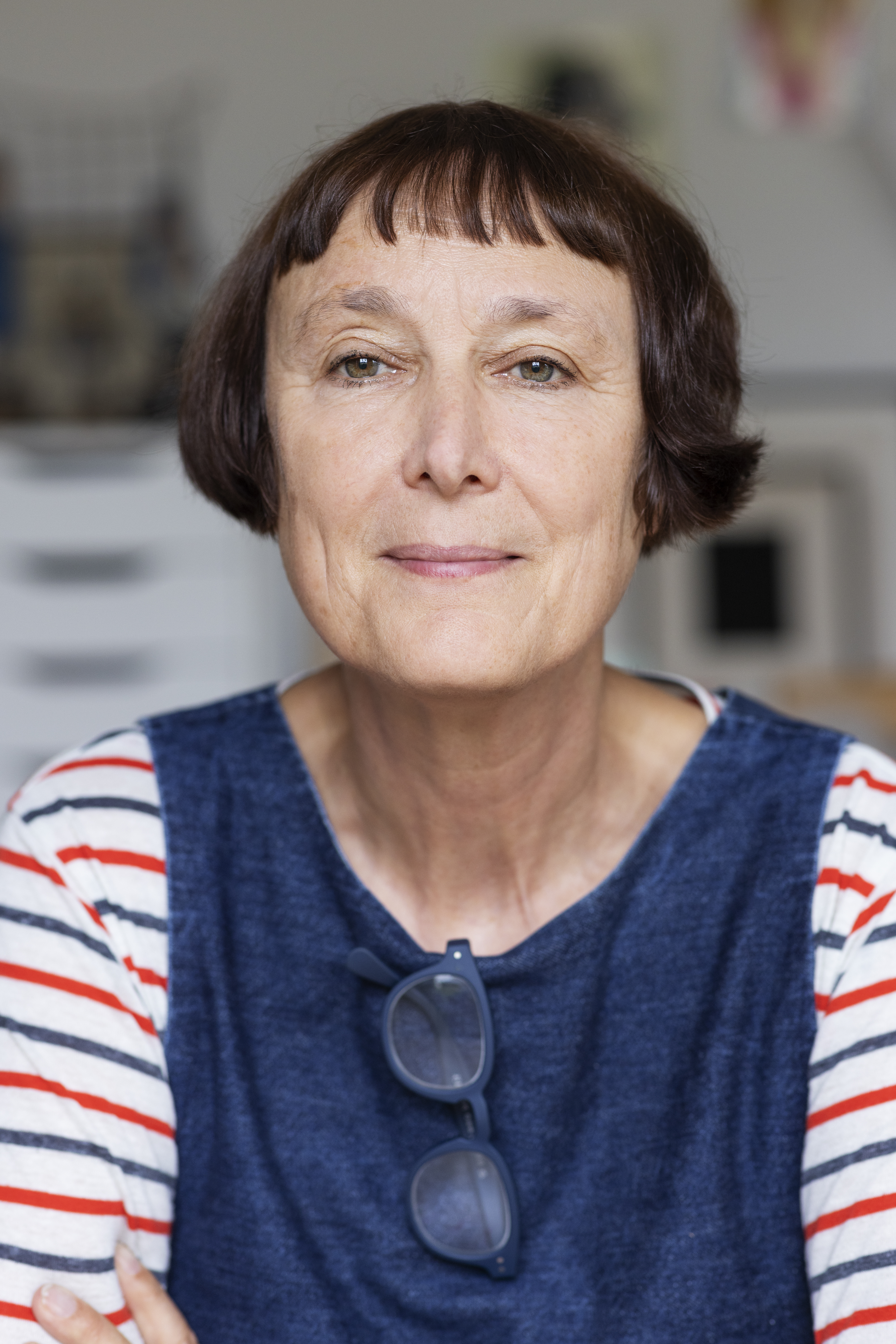
- Parker in 2023
- Born: 14 July 1956 (age 70); Cheshire, England
- Education: Gloucestershire College of Art and Design; Wolverhampton Polytechnic; University of Reading
- Known for: Conceptual art, installation art, sculpture
- Notable work: Cold Dark Matter: An Exploded View (1991); The Maybe (1995)

Cornelia Ann Parker CBE RA (born 14 July 1956) is an English visual artist, best known for her sculpture and installation art.

== Early life and education ==
Parker was born in 1956 in Cheshire, England. Her family lived on a smallholding. She described her childhood as very unhappy, living with her schizophrenic mother and her violent father. Her mother was hospitalised several times during Parker's childhood. Parker has two sisters. Her father wanted a boy, and co-opted her into being like a boy. Her German mother was a nurse in the Luftwaffe during the Second World War; her British grandfather fought in the Battle of the Somme in the First World War. Parker's mother was Catholic, so they would regularly go to high mass as children.

Aged 15, Parker visited the Tate with school, which was a formative experience for her in deciding her career. At the time, Parker's father wanted her to leave school and go to work in a factory.

Parker studied at the Gloucestershire College of Art and Design (1974–1975) and Wolverhampton Polytechnic (1975–1978). She originally thought she wanted to be a painter, but then realised she wanted to do sculpture, so shifted her focus. Marcel Duchamp was a big influence for her, as well as the Arte Povera movement. She received her MFA from Reading University in 1982 and honorary doctorates from the University of Wolverhampton in 2000, the University of Birmingham (2005), the University of Gloucestershire (2008) and the University of Manchester (2017).

Parker moved to London in 1984, first to Leytonstone. She squatted in a house, and later got taken on by a housing cooperation and lived in Leytonstone for ten years.

== Career ==
In 1997, Parker was shortlisted for the Turner Prize along with Christine Borland, Angela Bulloch, and Gillian Wearing (who won the prize). She was nominated for her series Avoided Objects.

Parker was Honorary Professor at the University of Manchester 2015–2018 and between 2016 and 2019 was Visiting Fellow at Lady Margaret Hall, Oxford. She was appointed Honorary Fellow at Trinity Hall, Cambridge in 2020.

Cornelia Parker's first solo museum exhibition was at the Institute of Contemporary Art, Boston in 2000.

In 2001, Parker was invited to make a piece for the New British Galleries at the V&A. She made Breathless II using squashed defunct instruments that would make up a brass band, and suspended them. She wanted to "rob them of their breath, because they were already breathless, but then to elevate them again and give them a new life again as a ceiling rose".

In 2009, for the opening of Jupiter Artland, a sculpture park near Edinburgh, Parker created a firework display titled Nocturne: A Moon Landing containing a lunar meteorite. Therefore, the moon "landed on Jupiter". The following year Parker made Landscape with Gun and Tree for Jupiter Artland, a nine-metre-tall cast iron and Corten steel shotgun leaning against a tree. It was inspired by the painting Mr and Mrs Andrews by Thomas Gainsborough, where Mr Andrews poses with a gun slung over his arm. The shotgun used in the piece is a facsimile of the one owned by Robert Wilson, one of the founders of Jupiter Artland.

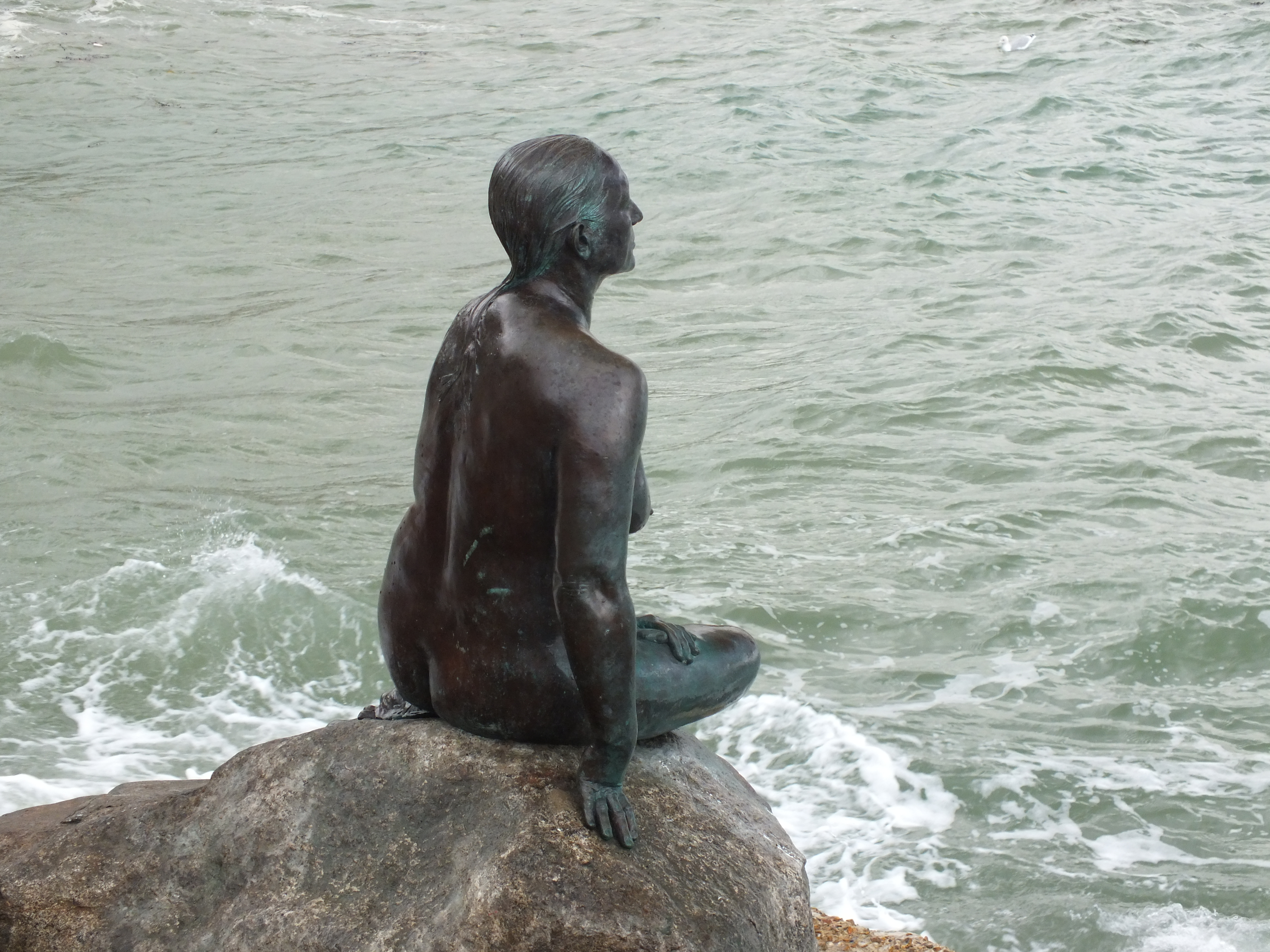
Folkestone Harbour Mermaid

For the Folkestone Triennial in 2011, Parker created The Folkestone Mermaid, her version of one of the popular tourist attractions in Copenhagen, The Little Mermaid. Through a process of open submission, Parker chose Georgina Baker, 38 year old mother of two, Folkestone born and bred. Unlike the idealised Copenhagen version, this is a life-size, life-cast sculpture, celebrating womankind.

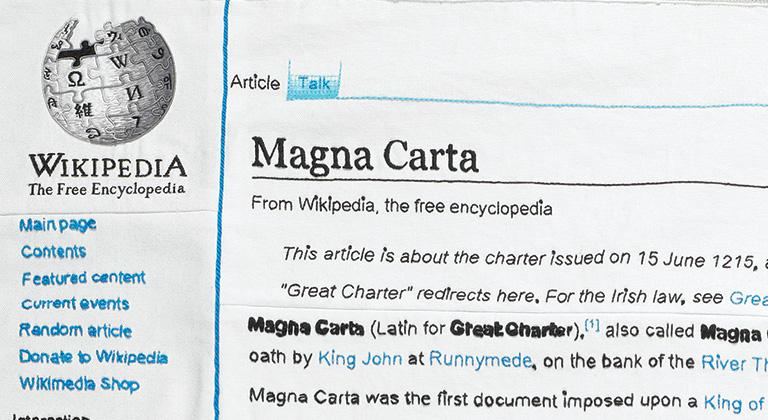
The top-left corner of Magna Carta (An Embroidery)

To celebrate the 800th anniversary of Magna Carta, Parker created Magna Carta (An Embroidery), a hand-embroidered representation of the Wikipedia article on Magna Carta as it was on 15 June 2014, completed in 2015. Embroiderers included members of the Embroiderers Guild, HM prisoners, Peers, MP's, judges, human rights lawyers, a US ambassador and his staff, and various public figures including Edward Snowden, Julian Assange, Jimmy Wales, Jarvis Cocker and Doreen Lawrence. The work was displayed at the British Library.

Parker presented One More Time, a Terrace Wires commission for St Pancras International Station, London, co-presented by HS1 Ltd. and the Royal Academy of Arts.

Parker continued her work as a curator for the Found exhibition for The Foundling Museum, which incorporated sixty-eight artists from an array of creative disciplines, as well as contributing her own piece, A Little Drop of Gin. This limited-edition print, nicknamed 'mother's ruin', was a photogravure using a 1750s gin glass and droppings of gin. Parker was named Artist of the Year in the 2016 Apollo Awards for her involvement and contributions in the art world.

On 1 May 2017, Parker was chosen as the official Election Artist for the 2017 United Kingdom general election; she was the first woman to take on that role. In this role she observed the election campaign leading up to the vote on 8 June, and was required to produce a piece of art in response. Parker created two films and a series of 14 photographic works as a result of this commission, which were previewed on BBC Newsnight on 2 February 2018 and made available online via the UK Parliament website prior to an exhibition in Westminster Hall.

In 2017, Parker made a series of blackboard drawings with the collaboration of 5- to 10-year-old schoolchildren from Torriano Primary School. The children were asked by the artist to copy out news headlines collected from various UK and US newspapers. "At that age, children have a barely formed view of the news and world affairs—they don't yet have a vote, but the political turmoil unfolding in their young lives will have a profound effect on their futures."

In 2019, Parker had a survey exhibition at Museum of Contemporary Art, Sydney for the Tenth Sydney International Art Series.

In May 2022, Parker exhibited 100 artworks at Tate Britain in her largest solo exhibition to date. She showed several of her films, Chomskian Abstract 2007, Made in Bethlehem 2012, War Machine 2015, American Gothic 2016, Left, Right & Centre 2017, Election Abstract 2018, Thatcher’s Finger 2018 and Flag 2022. Tabish Khan, reviewing the exhibition for Culture Whisper, said "Conceptual art can often be seen as abstruse but Cornelia Parker is able to make it accessible and playful, yet she also adds a level of intelligent rigour to her work that challenges us to think about the wider world we live in. It’s precisely what conceptual art should be."

In May 2023, her photograph "Snap" was used as the cover artwork for the Peter Gabriel song "Four Kinds of Horses".

In November 2024, Parker's glass rendition of the chandelier featured in Van Eyck's The Arnolfini Portrait was suspended in the Procuratie Vecchie in St Mark's Square, Venice. This work was created as part of Murano Illumina il Mondo (“Murano Lights Up the World”) and was the first time in living memory that artworks were permitted to be displayed in the colonnade.

== Work ==
=== Large-scale installations ===
Parker is best known for large-scale installations such as Cold Dark Matter: An Exploded View (1991) – first shown at the Chisenhale Gallery, East London, and later shown at the Tate Gallery. For this, she had a garden shed blown up by the British Army at the Army School of Ammunition at Banbury. She then suspended the fragments on wires as if suspending the explosion process in time. In the centre was a light which cast the shadows of the wood on the walls of the room. The work inspired an orchestral composition of the same name by Joo Yeon Sir.

In 1997, Parker's Turner Prize exhibition showed Mass (Colder Darker Matter) (1997), consisting of suspended charred remains of a church that had been struck by lightening in Texas. Eight years later, Parker made a companion piece "Anti-Mass" (2005), using charcoal from a black congregation church in Kentucky, which had been destroyed by arson. Hanging Fire (Suspected Arson) (1999) is another example of Parker's suspended sculptures, featuring charred remains of an actual case of suspected arson.

Subconscious of a Monument (2005) is composed of fragments of dry soil suspended on wires from the gallery ceiling. These lumps are the now-desiccated clay which was removed from beneath the Leaning Tower of Pisa in order to prevent its collapse.

In 2016, Parker became the first female artist to be commissioned to create a new work for the Roof Garden of the Met in New York. Transitional Object (PsychoBarn) is a scaled-down replica of the house from the 1960 Hitchcock film Psycho and was constructed using a salvaged red barn. Originally it was going to be an American red barn. Then she looked at Edward Hopper's A House by the Railroad, which Hitchcock had based the house in Psycho on. It is the facade of the building.

=== The Maybe (1995) ===
The Maybe (1995) at the Serpentine Gallery, London, was a performance piece conceived by Tilda Swinton, who lay, apparently asleep, inside a vitrine. She asked Parker to collaborate with her on the project, and to create an installation in which she could sleep. Swinton's original idea was to lie in state dressed as Snow White in a glass coffin, but through the collaboration with Parker the idea evolved into her appearing as herself and not as an actor posing as a fictional character.

Parker filled the Serpentine with glass cases containing relics that belonged to famous historical figures, such as the pillow and blanket from Freud's couch, Mrs. Simpson's ice skates, Charles Dickens' quill pen and Queen Victoria's stocking.

Parker saw the exhibition as being about mortality.

A version of the piece was later re-performed in Rome (1996) and then MoMA, New York (2013) without Parker's involvement.

=== Use of historical artworks ===
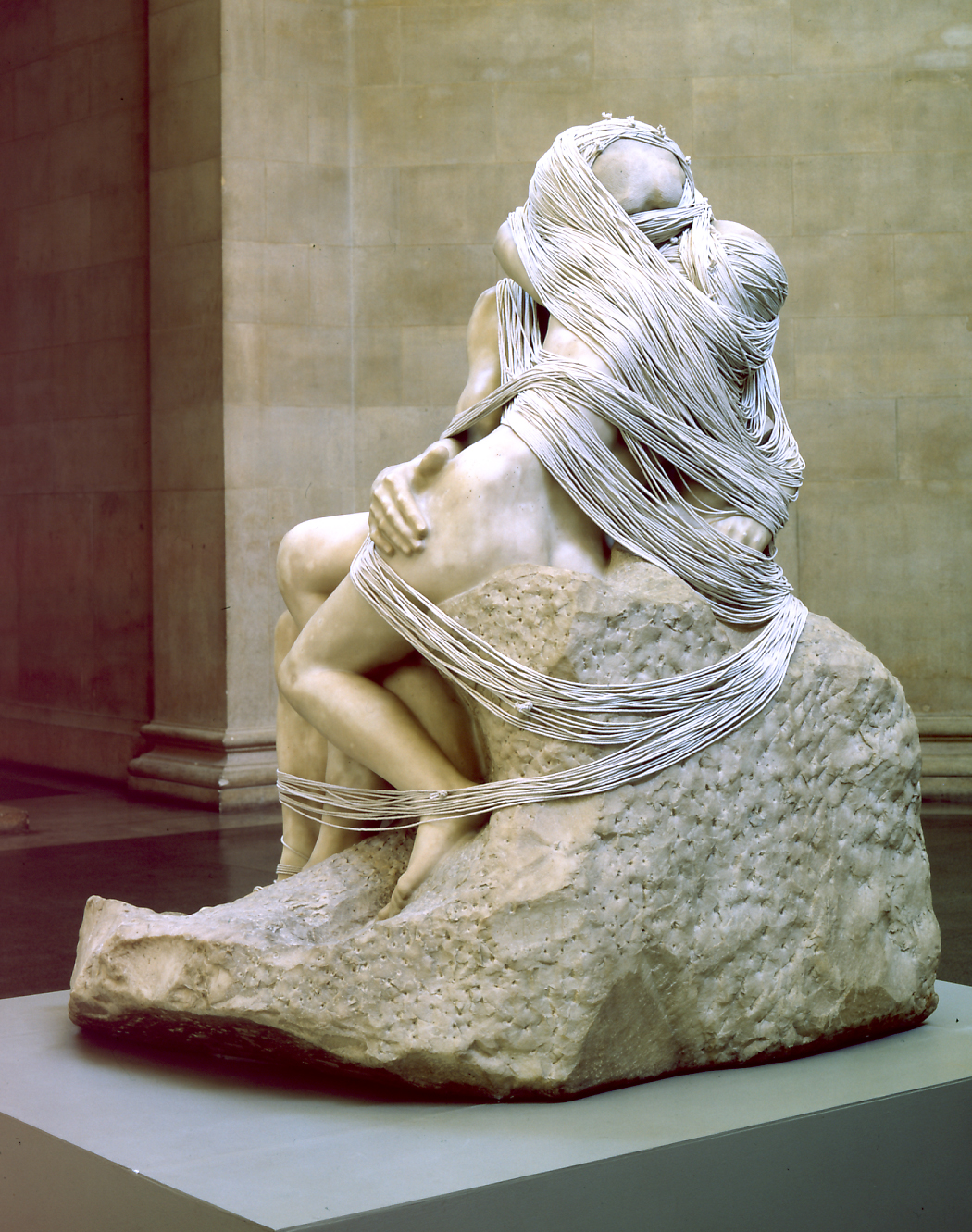
The Distance (A Kiss With String Attached), 2003

Parker has made interventions involving historical artworks. In 1998, in her solo show at the Serpentine Gallery she exhibited the backs of Turner paintings (Room for Margins) as works in their own right.

In 2023, Parker wrapped Rodin's The Kiss sculpture in Tate Britain with a mile of string (2003) as her contribution to the Tate Triennial Days Like These at Tate Britain. The intervention was titled The Distance (A Kiss With String Attached). She re-staged this piece as part of her mid-career retrospective at the Whitworth Art Gallery, Manchester, in 2015 and at Tate Britain in 2022.

=== Avoided Objects ===
Avoided Object is an ongoing series of smaller works which have been developed in liaison with various institutions, including the Royal Armouries, British Police Forces, Colt Firearms and Madame Tussauds.

These "avoided" objects have often had their identities transformed by being burned, shot, squashed, stretched, drawn, exploded, cut, or simply dropped off cliffs. Cartoon deaths have long held a fascination for Parker: "Tom being run over by a steamroller or Jerry riddled with bullet holes." Sometimes the object's demise has been orchestrated, or it may have occurred accidentally or by natural causes. According to Parker:

They might be 'preempted' objects that have not yet achieved a fully formed identity, having been plucked prematurely from the production line like Embryo Firearms 1995. They may not even be classified as objects: things like cracks, creases, shadows, dust or dirt The Negative of Whispers 1997: Earplugs made with fluff gathered in the Whispering Gallery, St Paul's Cathedral). Or they might be those territories you want to avoid psychologically, such as the backs, underbellies or tarnished surfaces of things."

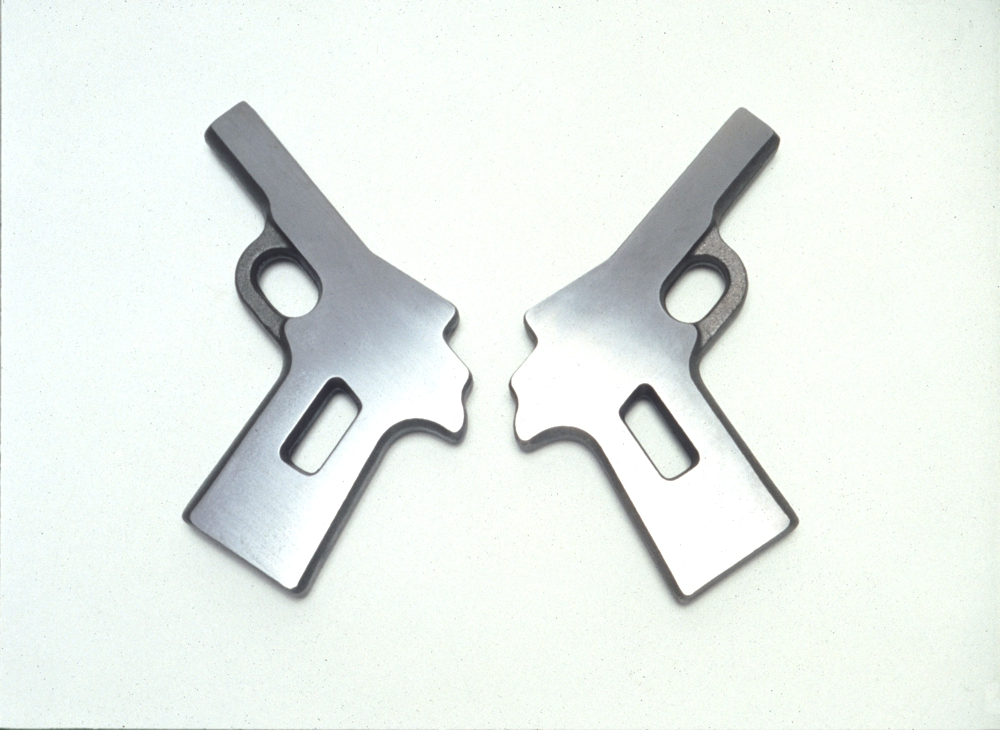
Embryo Firearms, 1995. Colt 45 guns in the earliest stage of production

At Colt Firearms, a firearms factory in Connecticut, she asked the ballistics experts to shoot pearls into a suit and money into a dress with a shot gun. She also saw the production of firearms whilst there, which prompted her to create Embryo Firearms, which are the early stage of a firearm being made, and finished.

The Negative of Whispers was made for Rebecca Stevens, the first British woman to climb Everest.

In her work Pornographic Drawings (1997), Parker used ink made by the artist who used solvent to dissolve (pornographic) video tape, confiscated by HM Customs and Excise.

I resurrect things that have been killed off... My work is all about the potential of materials—even when it looks like they've lost all possibilities.

== Exhibitions ==
| Year | Title | Location | City | Notes | Ref. |
|---|---|---|---|---|---|
| 1991 | Cold Dark Matter: An Exploded View | Chisenhale Gallery | London | | |
| 1995 | The Maybe | Serpentine Gallery | London | | |
| 1997 | Turner Prize | Tate | London | | |
| 2000 | Hanging Fire (Suspected Arson) | Institute of Contemporary Art | Boston | | |
| 2019 | Cornelia Parker | MCA | Sydney | Survey | |
| 2022 | Cornelia Parker | Tate Britain | London | Survey | |

== Curation ==
In 2011, Parker curated an exhibition titled Richard Of York Gave Battle In Vain for the Collections Gallery at the Whitechapel Gallery in London using selected works from the Government Art Collection arranged as a colour spectrum.

For the Royal Academy Summer Exhibition in 2014, Parker curated the Black and White Room which included a number of well-known artists who she thought should be future Royal Academicians.

In 2016, as part of her Hogarth Fellowship at the Foundling Museum, Parker curated a group exhibition titled FOUND presenting works from over sixty artists from a range of creative disciplines, asked to respond to the theme of "found", reflecting on the museum's heritage.

== Honours and recognition ==
Royal honours:

- Officer of the Order of the British Empire (OBE) in the 2010 Birthday Honours.
- Commander of the Order of the British Empire (CBE) in the 2022 Birthday Honours for services to the arts.

Honorary doctorates:

- 2000 – University of Wolverhampton
- 2005 – University of Birmingham
- 2008 – University of Gloucestershire
- 2017 – University of Manchester

Other honours and awards:

- 2010 – Royal Academician, Royal Academy of Arts, London
- 2016 – Artist of the Year Apollo Award. Other shortlisted artists were Carmen Herrera, David Hockney, Ragnar Kjartansson, Jannis Kounellis and Helen Marten.

== Media appearances ==
Parker has appeared in the following television programmes:

- 2013 – What Do Artists Do All Day?, a BBC Scotland production for BBC Four. In the programme she talks about her life and work.
- 2015 – Brilliant Ideas, Bloomberg TV. She discusses her inspirations and some of her work.
- 2016 – Imagine: Danger! Cornelia Parker, BBC One.
- 2016 – Gaga for Dada, a programme to mark the 100th anniversary of Dada, presented by Vic Reeves.
- 2016 – Bricks!, BBC Four. Broadcast on 21 September, marking the 40th anniversary of Carl Andre's sculpture Equivalent VIII, better known as "The Tate Bricks".
- 2013 – Christmas special of University Challenge, for University of Reading.

Radio:

- 21 February 2003 – Desert Island Disks, BBC Radio 4.

== Politics ==
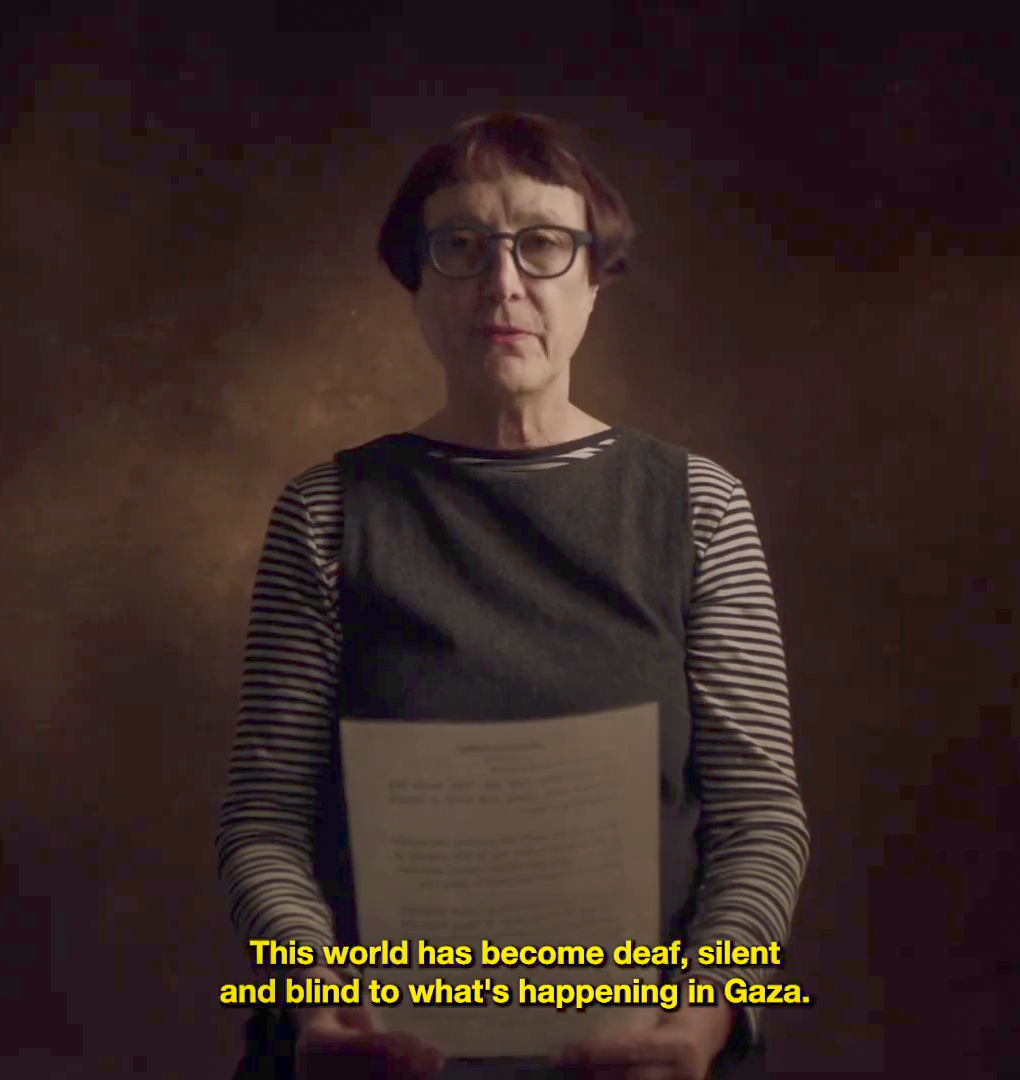
Parker participating in a plea to end the Gaza genocide in 2024

In politics, prior to the 2015 general election, she was one of several celebrities who endorsed the parliamentary candidacy of the Green Party's Caroline Lucas.

In 2024, Parker participated in a plea to end the Gaza genocide.

== Personal life ==
Parker met her former husband, Jeff McMillan, in 1997 when he was living and working in San Antonio. Parker had been looking for something that had been struck by lightning in Texas. She took charcoal from a church that had been struck, and McMillan helped her gather and suspend it. By the end of the project, they had become a couple. In August 1998, they were married on the Brooklyn Bridge at sunset.

Parker and McMillan did not plan to have children, but Parker became pregnant aged 45. Their daughter, Lily, was born in 2001.

Parker's parents both died in 2007.

Parker lives and works in London.

== See also ==
- Art of the United Kingdom
- Book Works
