= Laura Snowden =

British-French classical guitarist and composer

Laura Snowden (born 18 May 1989) is a British-French classical guitarist and composer. She is widely regarded as one of the leading classical guitarists of her generation since being handpicked by Julian Bream to continue his legacy of performing new commissions by leading contemporary composers, including Julian Anderson and Olli Mustonen .

== Education ==
Snowden was educated at the Yehudi Menuhin School where she studied guitar with Richard Wright, she was the first guitarist to graduate from the Menuhin School. Following this she studied at the Royal College of Music with Wright and Gary Ryan.

== Professional career ==
Snowden's 2015 Wigmore Hall debut was highly praised by critics;

Graham Wade, writing in Classical Guitar Magazine stated - "Snowden is not only an excellent guitarist who is technically virtuosic, but also a true musician whose interpretative capabilities are profound and exciting."

Erica Jeal, writing in The Guardian, noted how Snowden "held the Wigmore Hall rapt with a performance of unassuming poise and intensity"

She made her US debut in 2019 at the 27th Long Island Guitar Festival and her Asian debut at the 2017 Altamira Hong Kong International Guitar Symposium and Competition.

In 2019 she made her Irish debut at the Farmleigh Music and Arts Festival at the invitation of composer/guitarist Dave Flynn.

In 2020 Tonebase released a performance video of Snowden's interpretation of Benjamin Britten's Nocturnal, recorded at Britten's former home, the Red House in Aldeburgh.

Snowden performs in the folk group Tir Eolas, who were invited by John Williams to perform at Shakespeare's Globe Theatre.

Snowden is also an award-winning composer whose work has been commissioned and performed internationally and featured on BBC Radio 3.

== Awards ==
A scholar of the Julian Bream Trust, Snowden's awards include;

- Royal College of Music Guitar Prize
- 2012 Ligita International Guitar Duo Competition (with Tom Ellis)
- 2014 Ivor Mairants Guitar Award
- 2015 Alienor International Harpsichord Composition Competition Award
- Volos International Guitar Composition Competition, First Prize
