= Torriano Primary School =

Location
- Torriano Avenue; Kentish Town, London, NW5 2SJ; England
- Coordinates: 51.549736°N 0.132521°W

Information
- Type: Community Primary school
- Established: 1910
- Local authority: Camden
- Department for Education URN: 100023 Tables
- Ofsted: Reports
- Chair of governors: Luca Salice
- Head of School: Helen Bruckdorfer
- Gender: Coeducational
- Age: 3 to 11
- Website: www.torriano.camden.sch.uk

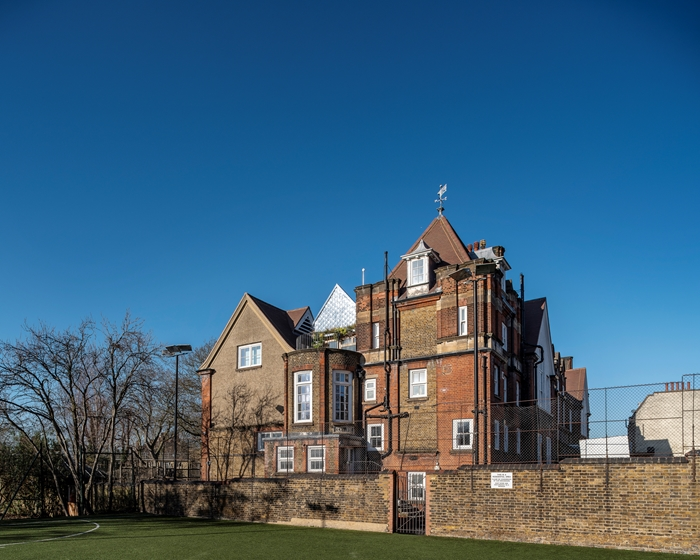
Torriano Primary School. The silver triangle on the roof is the STEM lab.

Torriano Primary School is a community primary school in Kentish Town, London. The school was founded in 2015 following the merger of the previous Torriano Junior School with Torriano Infants School. It is rated Outstanding by Ofsted. Torriano has inherited from its predecessor a partnership with Netley Primary School that was set up in 2012. Torriano Primary School is in a federation with Brecknock Primary School.

== Buildings and grounds ==
The oldest building is the Junior building which used to host the entire school. Edwardian in character, it was opened in 1910, a few years after the abolition of the London School Board and the transfer of its responsibilities to the London County Council. Pevsner comments 'Roughcast gables in an Arts and Crafts spirit'. The Infant building is a low-rise 1960s construction. The Infants' library was designed by local firm AY Architects and completed in 2013. The Gatehouse building was designed by Cullinan Studio and completed in 2010. The school grounds contain play areas designed by Erect Architecture dubbed Earthling Kingdom and Cloud Kingdom.

The most recent addition is the Science, technology, engineering, and mathematics activity lab, designed by Hayhurst & Co Architects which was a RIBA London Award winner in 2019 and won the RIBA London Small Project of the Year Award 2019 and was displayed as part of Open House London.

== History ==
Torriano Primary School was the result of a merger between Torriano Junior School and Torriano Infants' School. Previous notable headteachers included Ros Pomeyie at Torriano Infants; and Dilys Brotia OBE, Laurence Harding and Bavaani Nanthabalan at Torriano Junior School. Torriano Junior School was three times rated Outstanding by Ofsted, in 2000, 2005 and 2009. Torriano Infants School had also been an Outstanding school but was downgraded by Ofsted in 2014. The merged school retained the rating of the previous Junior School.

The school notable for its long tradition of democratic change, as shown in the Pathe News film "We Want A Zebra!" (1962). In 2017, artist Cornelia Parker made a series of blackboard drawings with the collaboration of 5-10 year-olds from the school. The children were asked to copy out news headlines collected from various UK and US newspapers. 'At that age, children have a barely formed view of the news and world affairs - they don't yet have a vote, but the political turmoil unfolding in their young lives will have a profound effect on their futures'. From September 2018 to July 2019, the school took part in a pilot study to improve gender equality through education.

== Awards ==
Torriano is a Rights Respecting School; its predecessor achieved level 1 in 2009 and level 2 in 2011. It was invited to join the London Schools' Gold Club for 2013/14 and for 2015/16. It achieved Eco-School Silver standard in 2012. Torriano is also part of the Camden Primary Partnership, a Teaching School Alliance. Torriano Infants and Torriano Junior Schools had both achieved the Healthy Schools Bronze award in 2013.

== Notable alumni ==
Actor Daniel Kaluuya was educated at the school.
