= Margo Selby =

British textile artist

- Born: 1977 (age 48–49); Eastbourne, England
- Education: Chelsea College of Arts; Royal College of Art
- Known for: Textile art

Margo Selby is an English textile artist and the author of books on textile design. She has a workshop in Whitstable, Kent.

She was also an actress in the 1990s, best known for her role as Julie Corrigan in Grange Hill, from 1990 to 1996.

== Early life ==
Selby was born in Eastbourne, East Sussex. Selby graduated with a Bachelor of Arts (BA) from Chelsea College of Arts and a Master of Arts (MA) from the Royal College of Art.

== Work ==
One of Britains "best and most successful weavers", Selby is known for her vibrant colours and three-dimensional, textured designs, and produces cushions, rugs and other home accessories with strong graphics and patterns. She creates home goods as well as large commissions. She hand weaves when designing new fabrics, and then after many iterations evaluates whether the fabric can be produced industrially.

Selby is interested in "the structure and sense of purpose afforded by the rigour and discipline of textile craft skills", and has talked about this at conferences.

Selby has emphasised sustainability in her work, using time-honoured techniques to manage resources and reuse any leftover materials. Her work has been commissioned by the Royal Opera House.

== Books ==
- Selby, Margo (2011), Contemporary weaving patterns, A. & C. Black Publishers Limited, Wikidata Q124694667
- Selby, Margo (2012). Color and Texture in Weaving: 150 Contemporary Designs. Interweave Press. ISBN 978-1-59668-372-3. OL 25231413M. Wikidata Q124694691.
