= HM Prison Channings Wood =

Men's prison in Devon, England

HMP Channings Wood
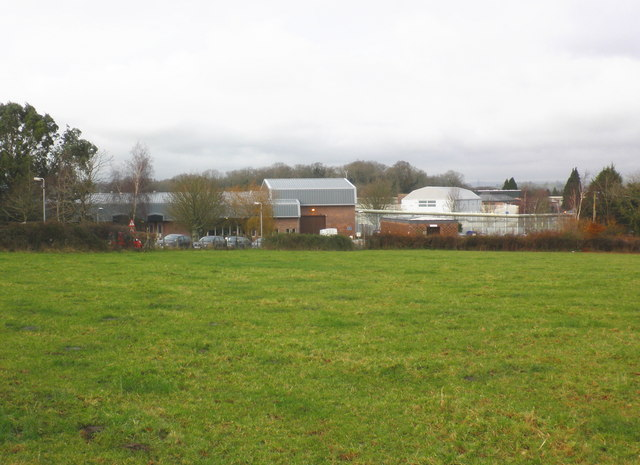
- HM Prison, Channings Wood

- Location in Devon
- Location: Ogwell, Devon; 50.5116°N 3.6528°W
- Security class: Adult Male/Category C
- Population: 731 (April 2008)
- Opened: 1974
- Managed by: HM Prison Services
- Governor: Huw Sullivan
- Website: Channings Wood at justice.gov.uk

HM Prison Channings Wood is a Category C men's prison, located in the parish of Ogwell (near Newton Abbot) in Devon, England. The prison is operated by His Majesty's Prison Service.

== History ==
The United States Army built a camp in Ogwell and shooting range in Denbury in the run up to the invasion of Europe in 1944. The site was taken over by the Royal Corps of Signals junior training Regiment. The construction of Channings Wood Prison began on the former Ministry of Defence site in 1973, by a combination of contract and prison labour. The prison officially opened in July 1974, although some of the wooden huts remained in use whilst building and landscaping continued into the eighties.

From the 1990s Channings Wood gained a reputation for pioneering therapeutic work to reform sex offenders and drug addicts. This was confirmed in a report by His Majesty's Chief Inspector of Prisons in April 2003, however the report noted that overcrowding at Channings Wood was putting this good work at risk. Further accommodation was constructed at the prison in 2003.

Channings Wood was praised again in a report in 2005 which highlighted the prison's education programme, accommodation and levels of safety. However, a year later ten inmates staged a rooftop protest at the prison for 28 hours. The prisoners were "protesting about their food being cooked by prisoners on the sex offender registry." The protest ended peacefully.

A new 64-bed unit was opened at Channings Wood in 2007. The new wing houses the specialist Therapeutic Community which tackles drug misuse issues amongst prisoners.

In 2024, Channings Wood started another expansion with new facilities being constructed. These are due to be completed around 2026.

== The prison today ==
Channings Wood Prison houses offenders serving a wide range of sentence lengths, and predominantly receives new arrivals from local prisons across the South West Area. Two of the residential living blocks at the prison make up the Vulnerable Prisoners Unit which specialises in delivering Sex Offender Treatment Programmes.

The prison provides educational courses to prisoners, include Barbering, Business Studies, Catering, Industrial Cleaning, Creative Media Studies, Customer Services, Driving Theory, Dry-Lining, Electrical Installation, ESOL, Food Hygiene, Fork Lift Driving, Horticulture, Information Technology, Painting and Decorating, Physical Education and Yoga. It also offers employment opportunities.

The prison offers a gym and league sports. The prison chaplaincy offers a chapel and multi-faith room to inmates and staff at the prison.

== Notable inmates ==
=== Former inmates ===
- Luke McCormick
- Harry Roberts

=== Current inmates ===
- Paul Gadd (Gary Glitter)
