= John Lewis (businessman) =

British businessman (born 1940)

Sir John Henry James Lewis, OBE (born 1940) is a British businessman, solicitor and charity executive. He has been chairman of Photo-Me International since 2010 and the Attingham Trust since 1990.

== Early life and education ==
Born in 1940, Lewis is the son of Leonard Lewis, QC, and his wife Rita. He attended the independent boarding school Shrewsbury School and then University College London, graduating from the latter with a law degree.

== Career ==
=== Law and business ===
Lewis was admitted a solicitor in 1966; he became a partner at Lewis Lewis and Co., which merged with Jacques and Co. to form Lewis and Jacques before merging finally in 1995 into Eversheds, where Lewis was a consultant between 1995 and 2020. Lewis was also chairman of Cliveden Plc between 1984 and 2002, and has been chairman of Photo-Me International since 2010, having joined its board of directors in 2008.

=== Public and charitable service ===
Lewis served on the British Tourist Authority's board in the 1990s. He has been chairman of the Attingham Trust since 1990 and the Public Monuments and Sculpture Association since 2013. He chaired the Wallace Collection between 1997 and 2004, and the Hertford House Trust for ten years until 2014, and has been a trustee for a number of charitable foundations relating to art and the preservation of historic buildings or gardens.

== Honours and awards ==
Lewis was appointed an Officer of the Order of the British Empire (OBE) in 2004 for "services to Arts" in connection with work with the Wallace Collection. He was knighted in the 2019 New Year Honours for "services to the Arts and Philanthropy".
