= St Peter's Church, Edensor =

Coordinates: 53°13′32.04″N 1°37′33.56″W

St Peter’s Church, Edensor
- St Peter’s Church, Edensor
- OS grid reference: SK 25067 69901
- Location: 1 Jap Lane, Edensor, Bakewell DE45 1PH
- Country: England
- Denomination: Church of England
- Churchmanship: High Church

History
- Dedication: St Peter

Architecture
- Heritage designation: Grade I listed
- Architect: Sir George Gilbert Scott
- Completed: 1867

Administration
- Diocese: Diocese of Derby
- Archdeaconry: Derbyshire Peaks and Dales
- Deanery: Bakewell and Eyam

Clergy
- Vicar: Mark Griffin

St Peter's Church, Edensor, is a Grade I listed Anglican church in Edensor, Derbyshire. St Peter's is the closest parish church in the Church of England to Chatsworth House, home of the Dukes of Devonshire, most of whom are buried in the churchyard. St Peter's is in a joint parish with St Anne's Church, Beeley.

The historic listing summary for the church states that it was built in the 12th century, modified in the 15th and "rebuilt in 1867 by Sir George Gilbert Scott".

== Church ==
=== History ===
The original village of Edensor was located immediately next to Chatsworth House, but between 1838 and 1842 the 6th Duke of Devonshire had it demolished so it would be out of sight over a hill. The planning of the new village and the parish church was overseen by Joseph Paxton. The church was built for the 7th Duke of Devonshire. Consecrated in 1870, St Peter's comprises a west steeple, nave with aisles, chancel, north vestry and south east chapel.

A 2020 report states that the current church with its 166-feet-high spire, designed by George Gilbert Scott, was not built until about 25 years after the village was completed. It was a "replacement for the original squat-towered church that had occupied the site previously". Derbyshire Council states that "Edensor Church was taken down and rebuilt in 1867, incorporating some of the old Norman" church. Another source specifies that "very little remains of the Norman church".

The Council's research indicates that "the remains of two piscinas have been preserved" but does not state whether they are from the Norman era. Two features may be from that earlier church: "The nave is separated from the aisles by four pointed arches on each side, four of which belonged to the old church. The porch also, with some restoration, is a remnant of that edifice".

=== Memorials ===
- The Cavendish Memorial, a magnificent early-17th-century church monument to Henry (died 1616) and William (died 1625), commemorates the sons of Sir William Cavendish and Bess of Hardwick. The younger William was the 1st Earl of Devonshire.
- The Barker family memorial commemorates a family member who fought aboard HMS Swiftsure in the Battle of Trafalgar.
- Brass memorial to John Beton (died 1570), a servant of Mary, Queen of Scots.
- Grave of Kathleen Cavendish, Marchioness of Hartington (née Kennedy, 1920–1948). Her grave is marked with a headstone; a plaque in the ground commemorates the visit on 29 June 1963 of her brother, U.S. President John F. Kennedy, to the gravesite.
- Tablet to Andrew Cavendish, 11th Duke of Devonshire (d. 2004), erected to commemorate his jubilee.
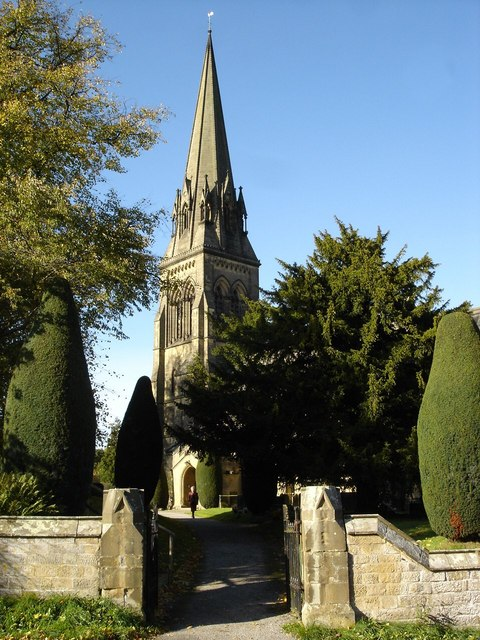
Churchyard

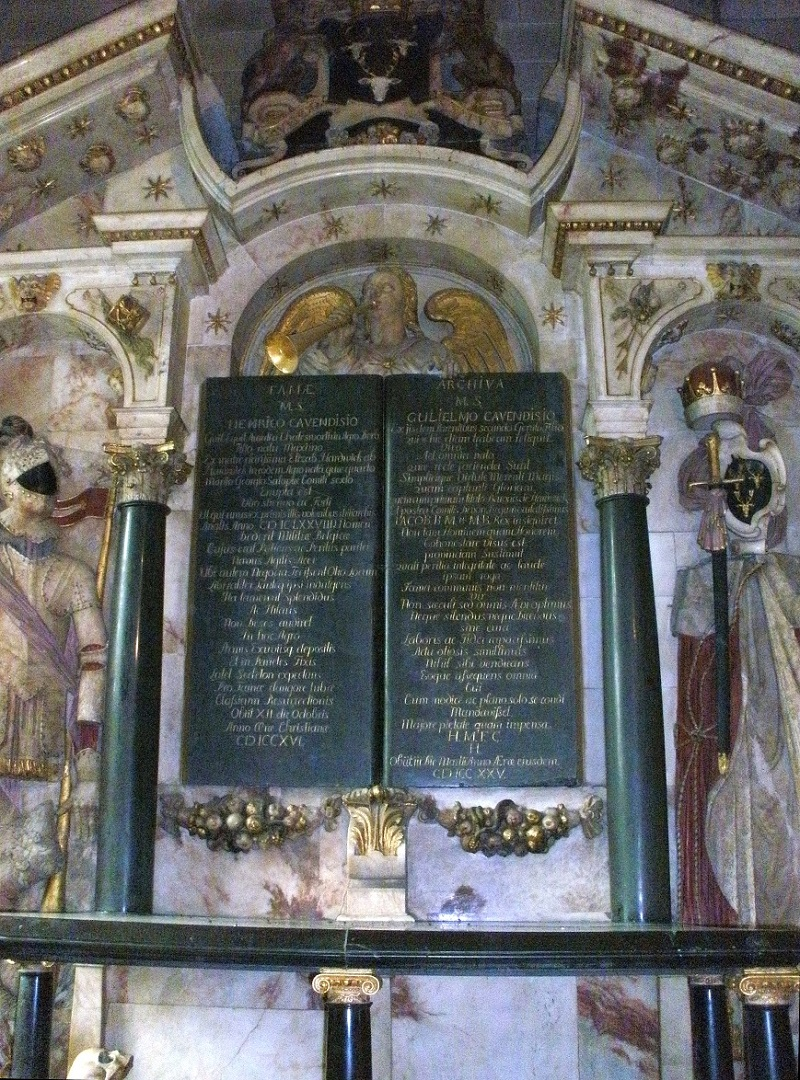
Cavendish Memorial

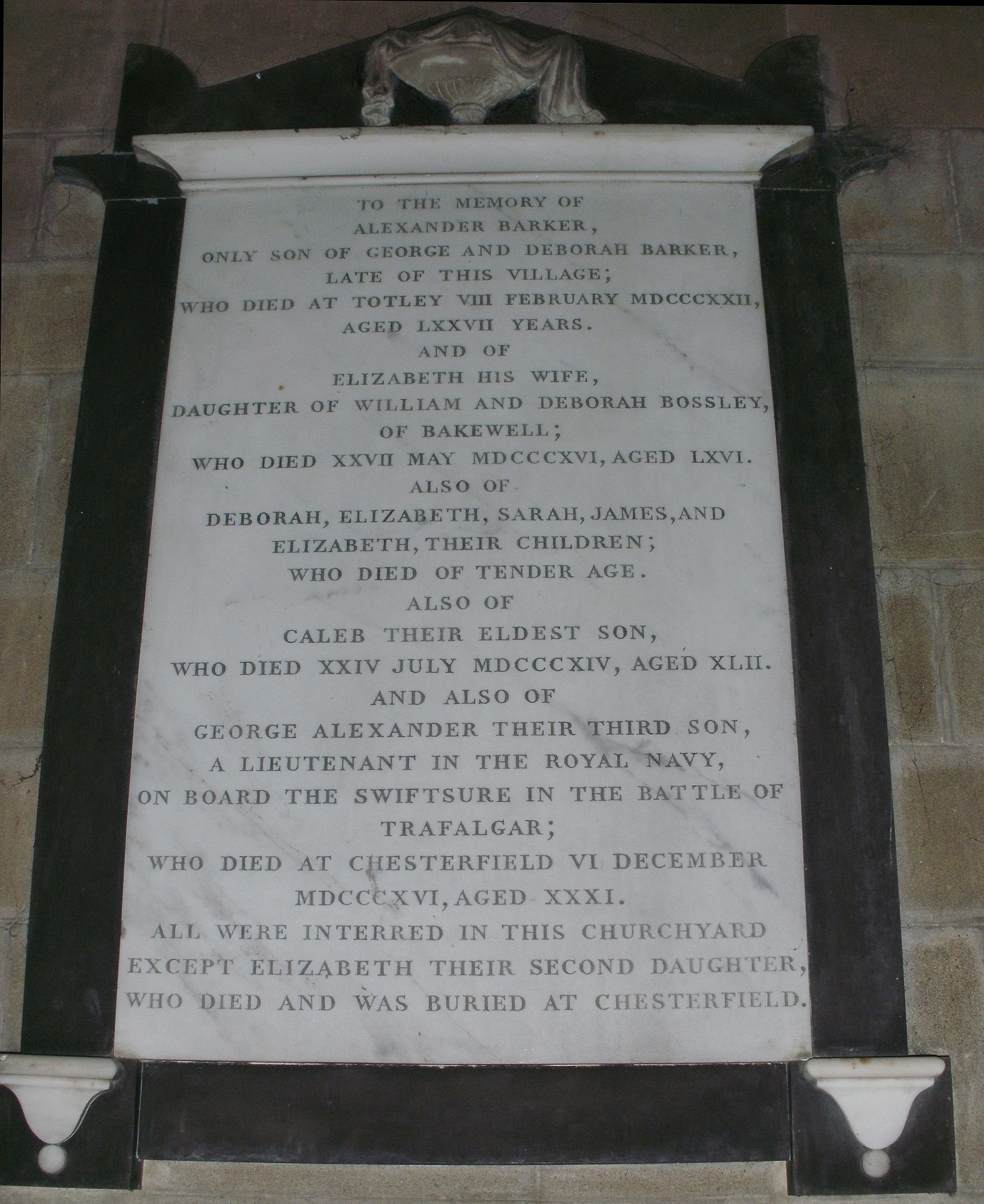
Barker memorial

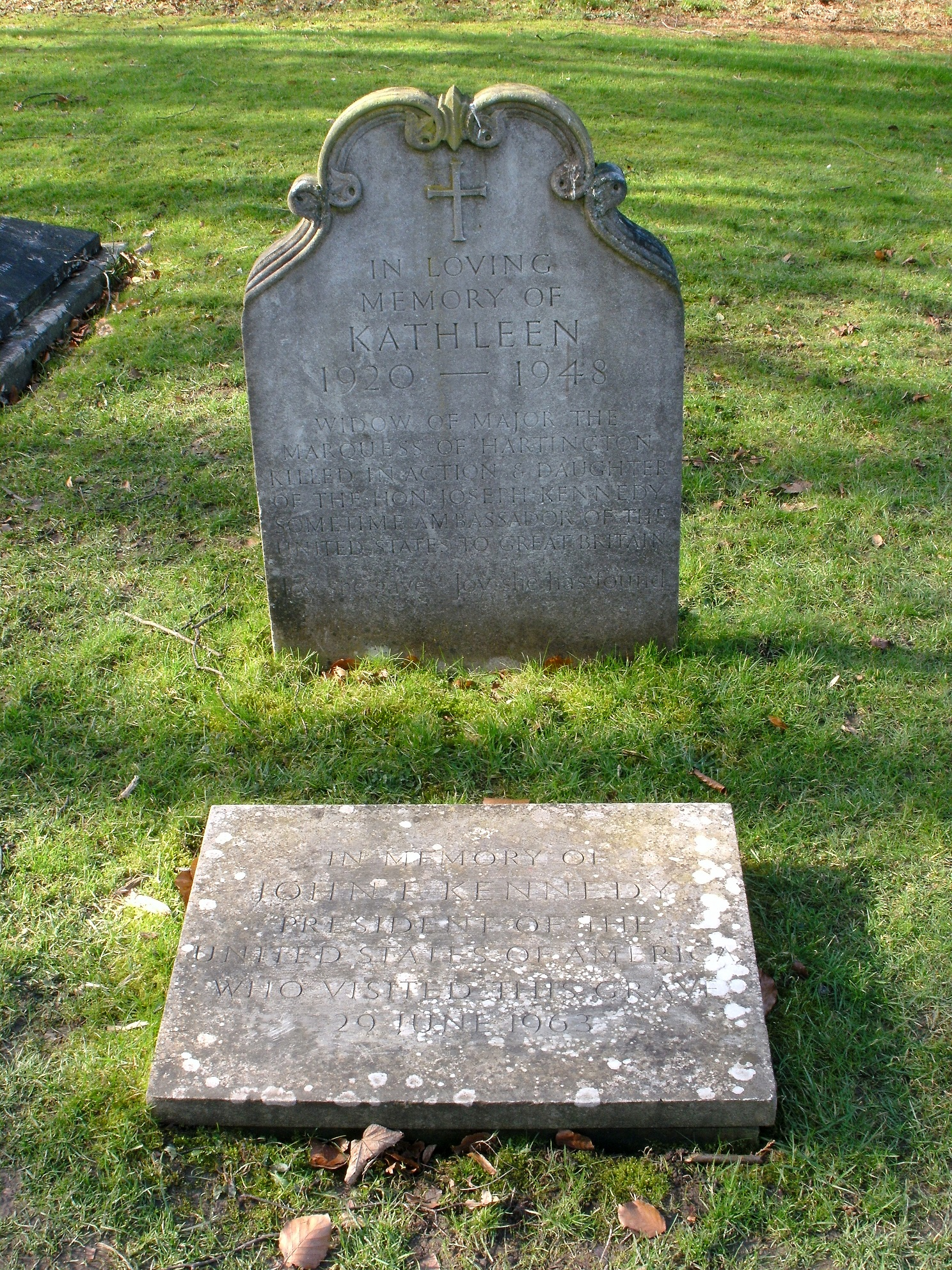
Grave of Kathleen Cavendish, Marchioness of Hartington. On her gravestone, it says "Joy she gave joy she has found"

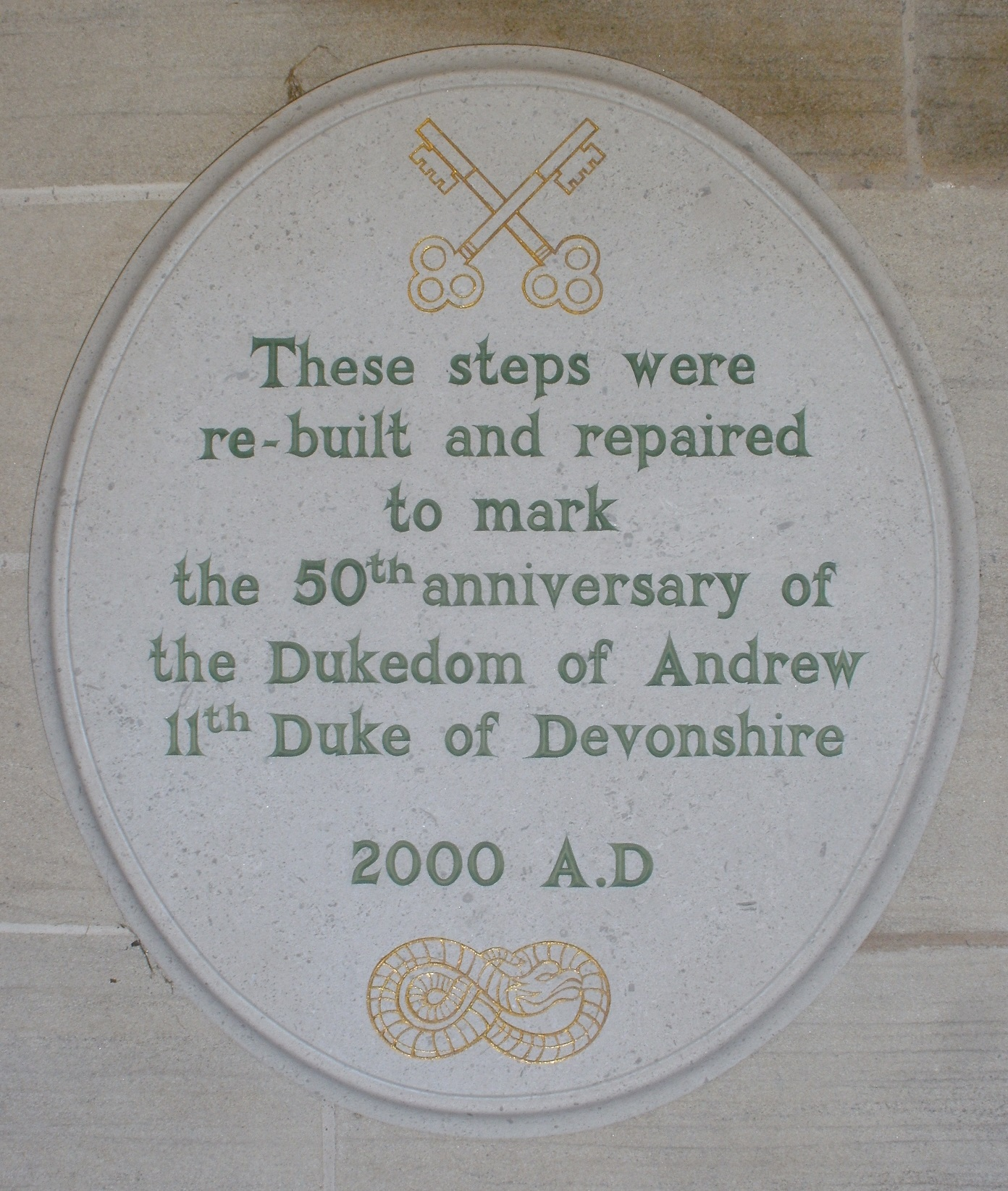
Jubilee tablet to Andrew Cavendish, 11th Duke of Devonshire

=== Stained glass ===
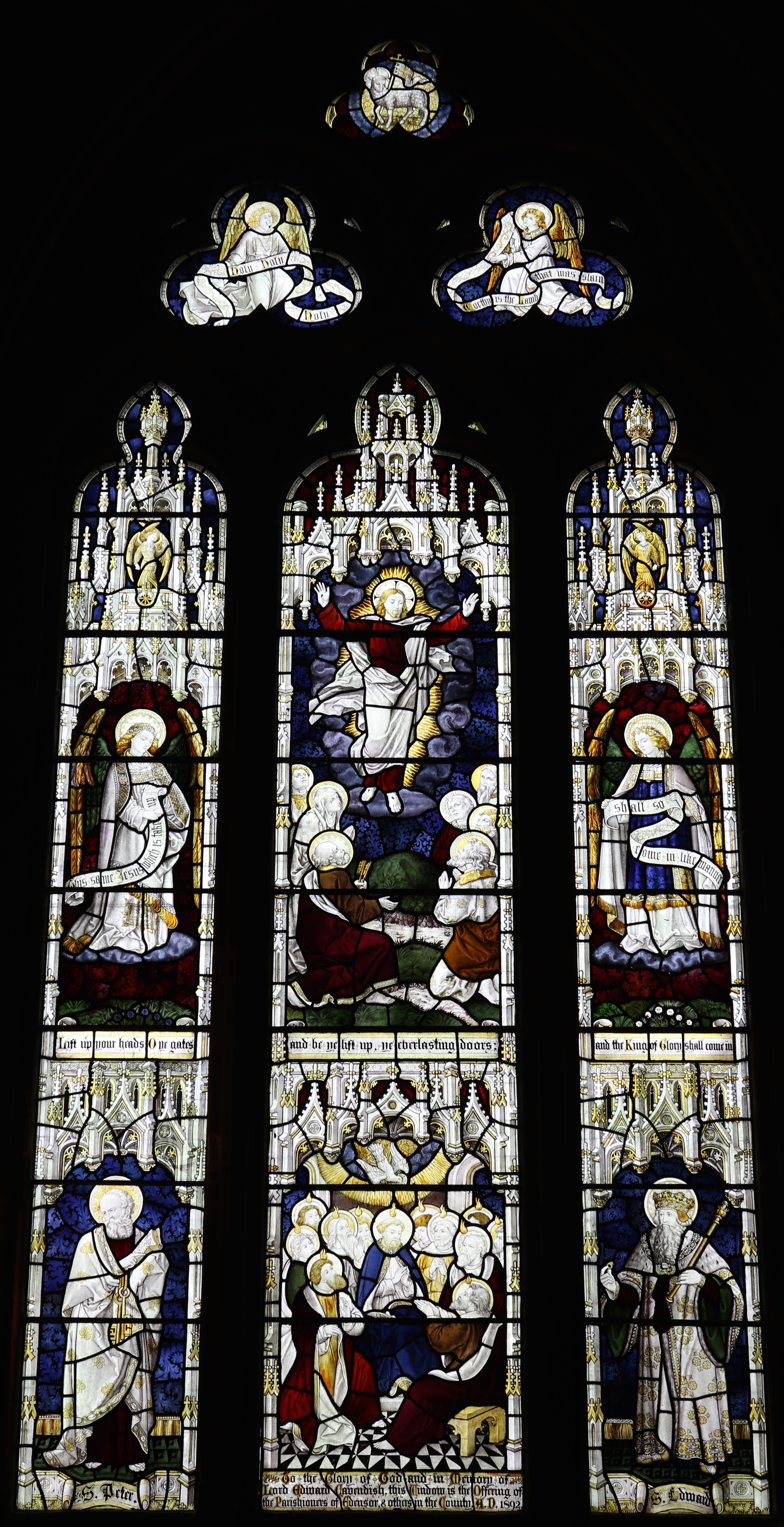
East window in memory of Lord Edward Cavendish. By Burlison and Grylls dating from 1892.

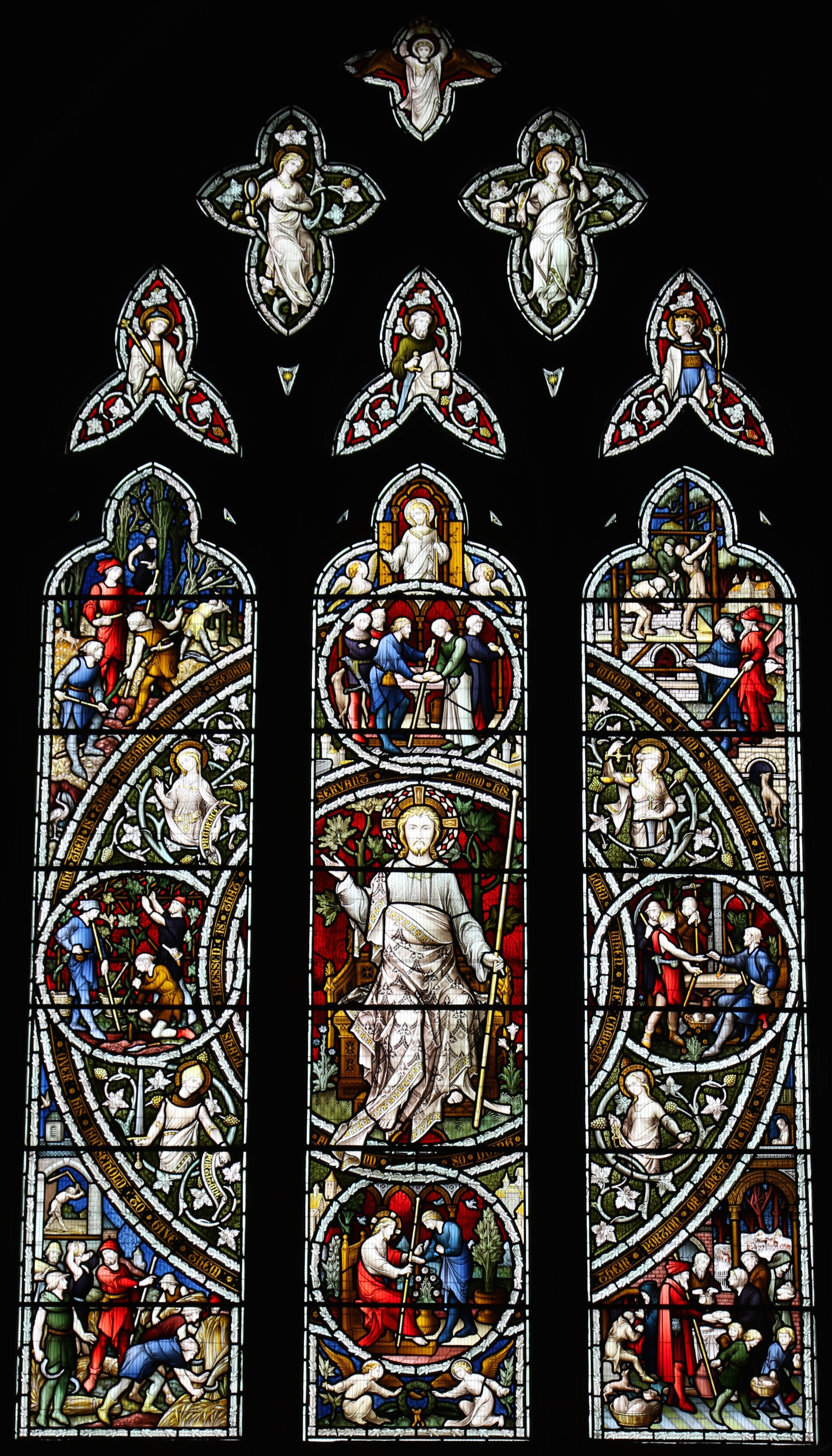
West window in memory of John Cottingham, steward to the 7th Duke of Devonshire. The window depicts the virtues of a good steward. By Hardman & Co. dating from 1879.

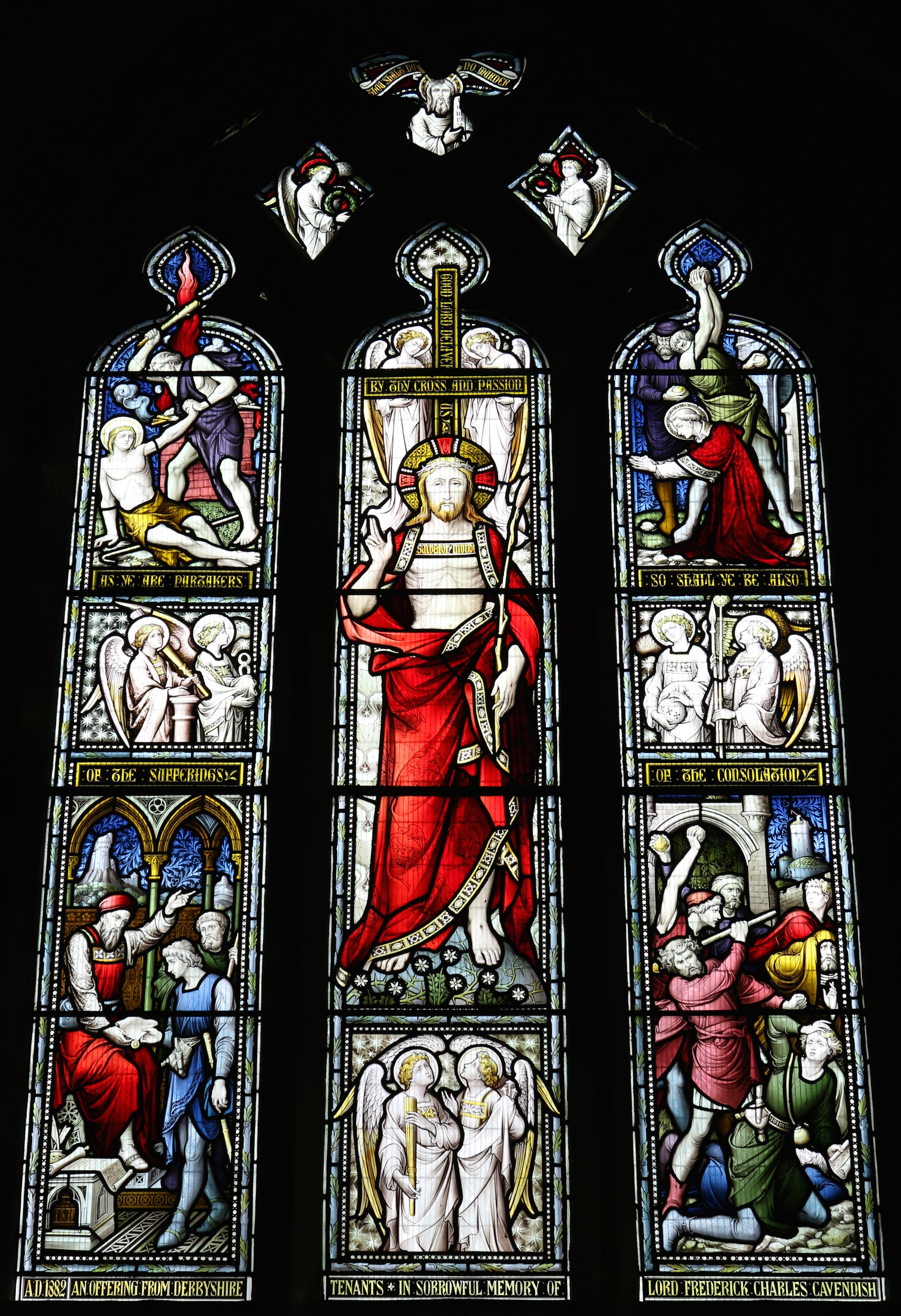
Chapel window in memory of Lord Frederick Charles Cavendish. By Hardman & Co. dating from 1882

=== Organ ===
The pipe organ was built by Bishop and Son and dates from 1873. A specification of the organ can be found on the National Pipe Organ Register.

==== Organists ====
- Richard Sedding ca. 1853
- Miss Forrester ca. 1870
- Albert Ernest Wragg 1879 - 1929 (previously organist of Stannington Church)
- T.H. Mosley 1929 - 1932 (afterwards organist of All Saints' Church, Bakewell, Derbyshire)
- Herbert Pilkington 1932 - 1942 (formerly organist of Beeley Wesleyan Methodist Church)
- A. Morrey 1942 - ???? (formerly organist of Christ Church, Normacot)

== Churchyard ==
Sir Joseph Paxton (d. 1865) is buried in St Peter's churchyard, as are most Dukes of Devonshire and their families, including U.S. President John F. Kennedy's sister Kathleen, who was married to the 10th Duke's eldest son. Kennedy visited the grave during his presidency. Members of the Cavendish family buried here include:

- William Cavendish, 6th Duke of Devonshire (1790–1858), founder of modern-day Edensor
- Lord Frederick Charles Cavendish (1836–1882)
- Lucy Caroline, Lady Frederick Cavendish (1841–1925)
- William Cavendish, 7th Duke of Devonshire (1808–1891)
- Spencer Cavendish, 8th Duke of Devonshire (1833–1908)
- Victor Cavendish, 9th Duke of Devonshire (1868–1938)
- Edward Cavendish, 10th Duke of Devonshire (1895–1950)
- Andrew Cavendish, 11th Duke of Devonshire (1920–2004)
- Deborah Cavendish, Duchess of Devonshire (1920–2014)

Their graves can be found on the highest spot of the churchyard in the Cavendish family plot.

The churchyard also contains three Commonwealth service war graves of World War I: a British soldier, a British sailor and a Canadian Army officer.

== See also ==
- Grade I listed churches in Derbyshire
- Grade I listed buildings in Derbyshire
- Listed buildings in Edensor
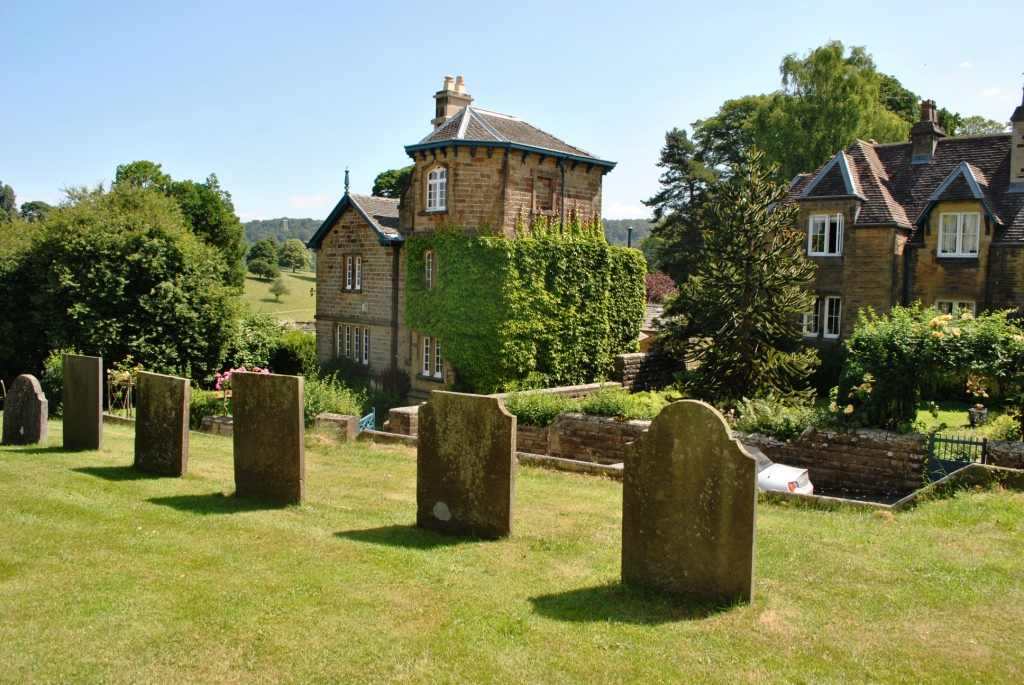
St Peter's churchyard

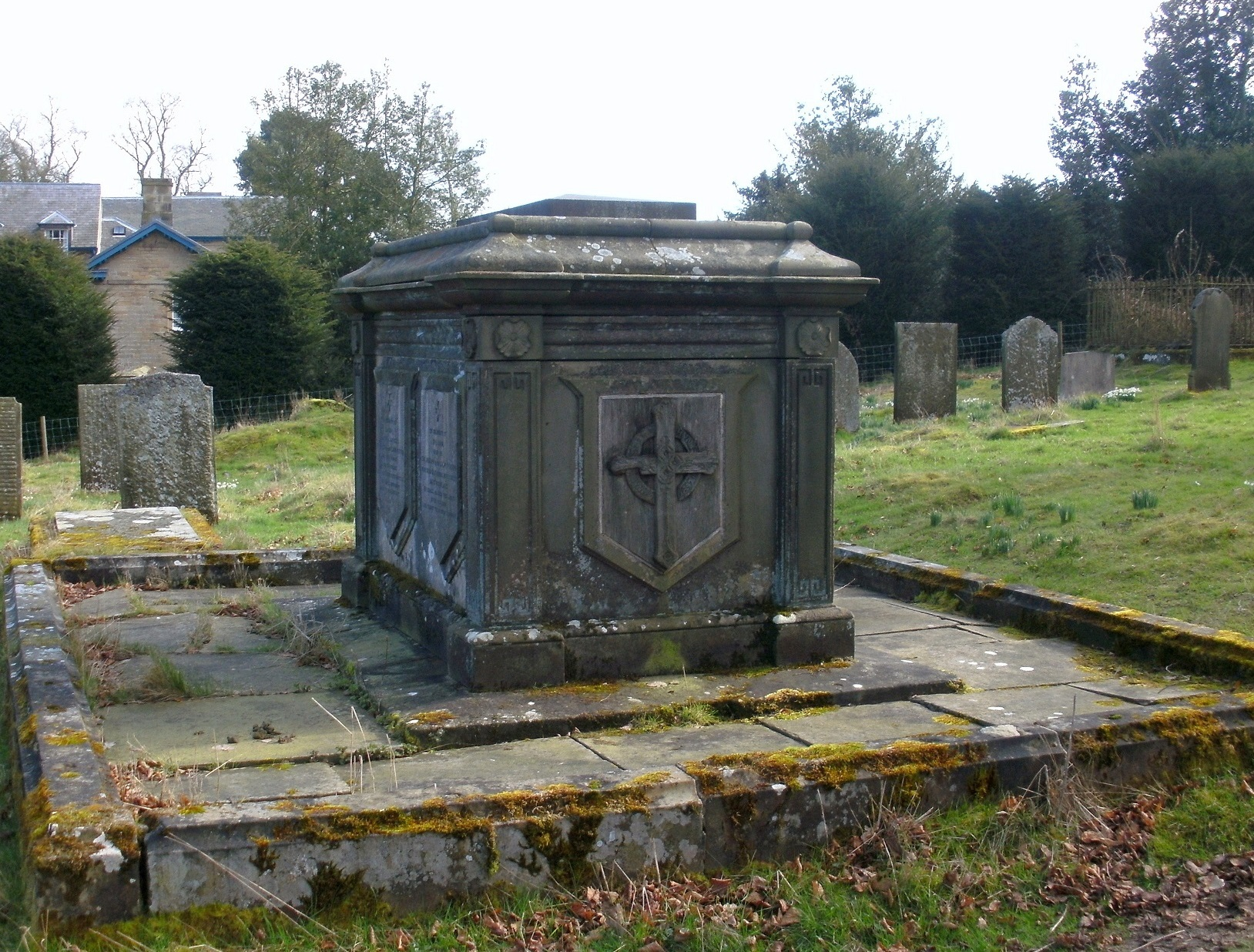
Grave of Sir Joseph Paxton

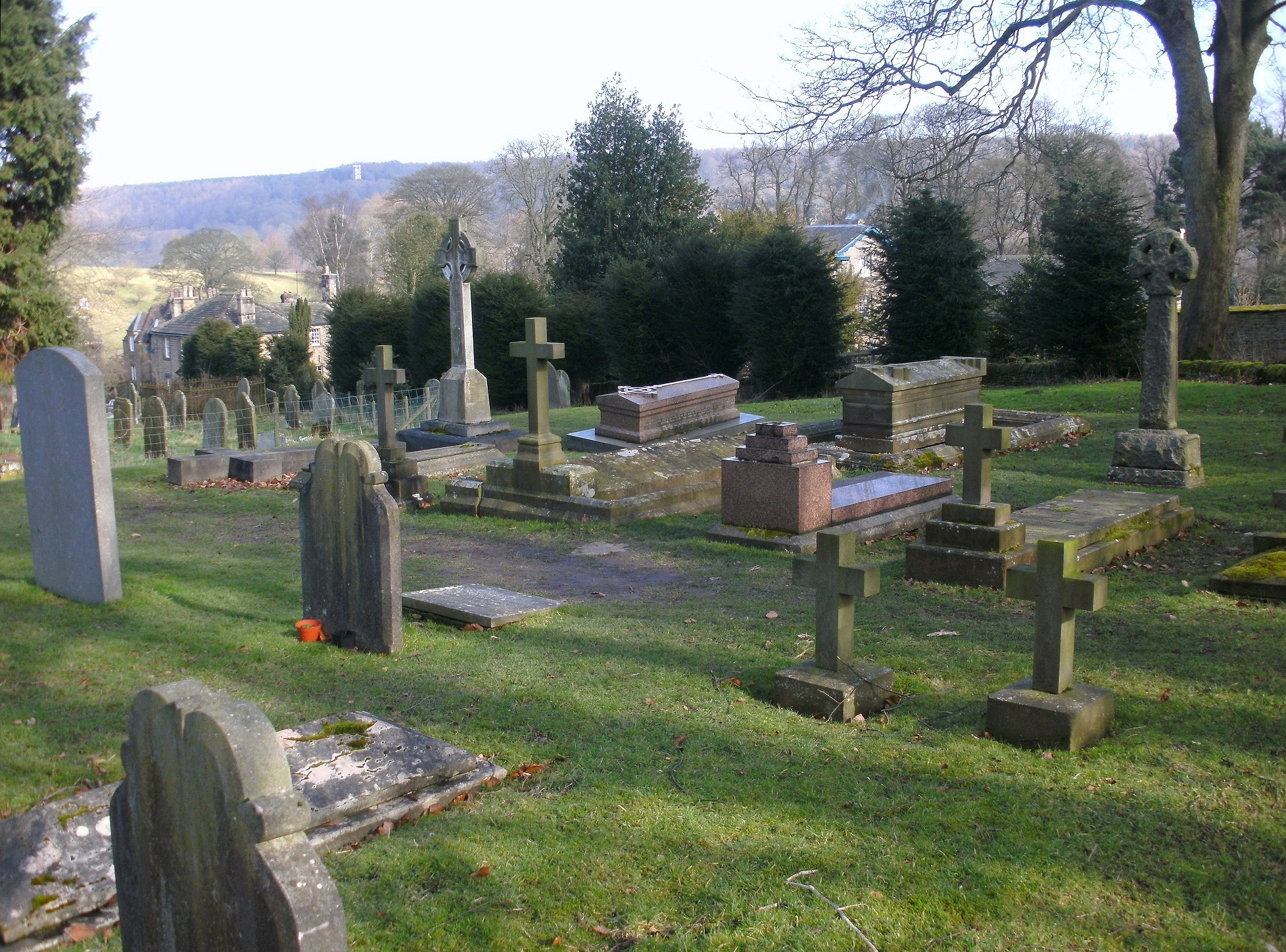
Cavendish family plot with the graves of the Dukes of Devonshire

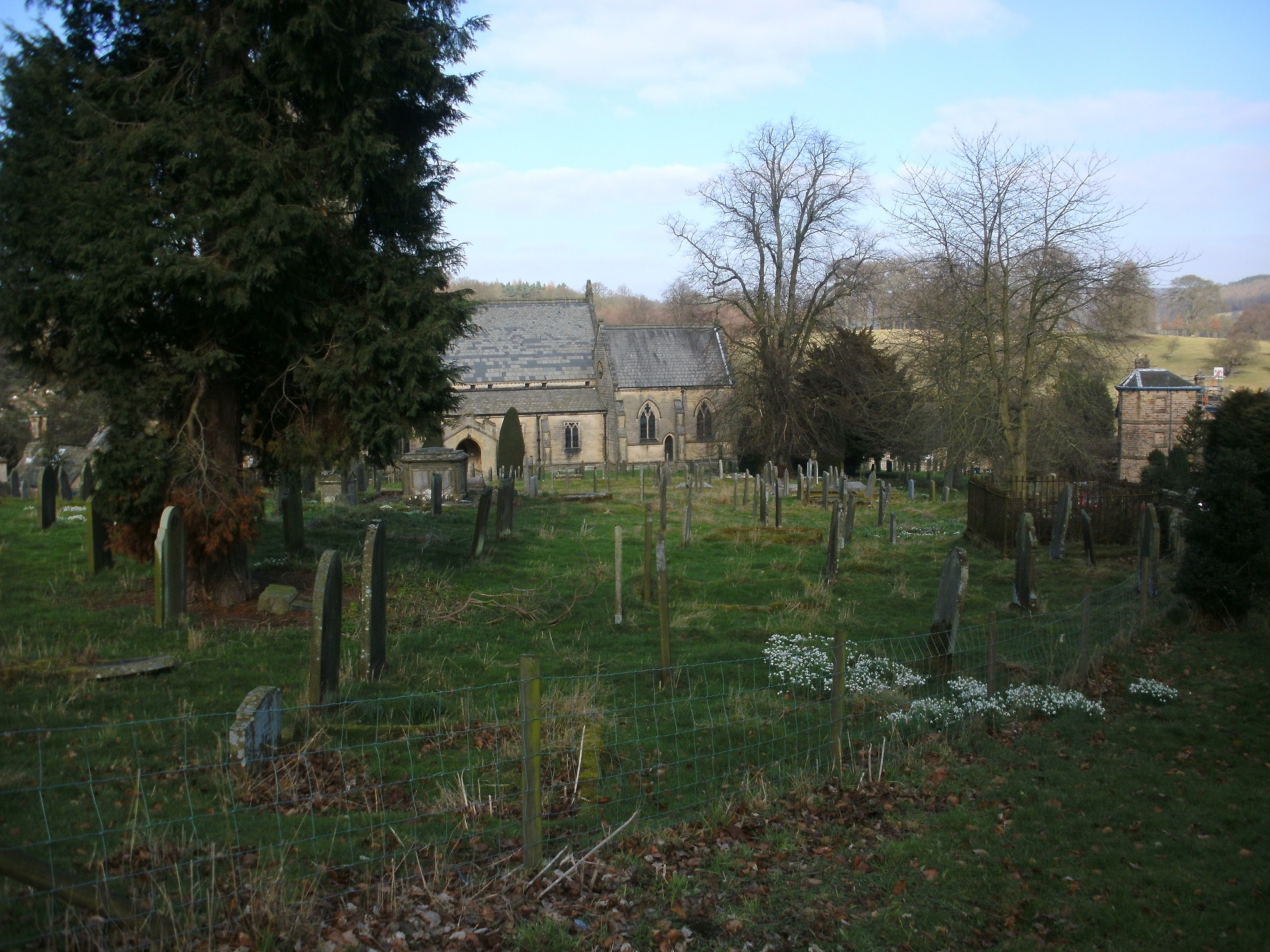
View from the Cavendish family plot down to the church
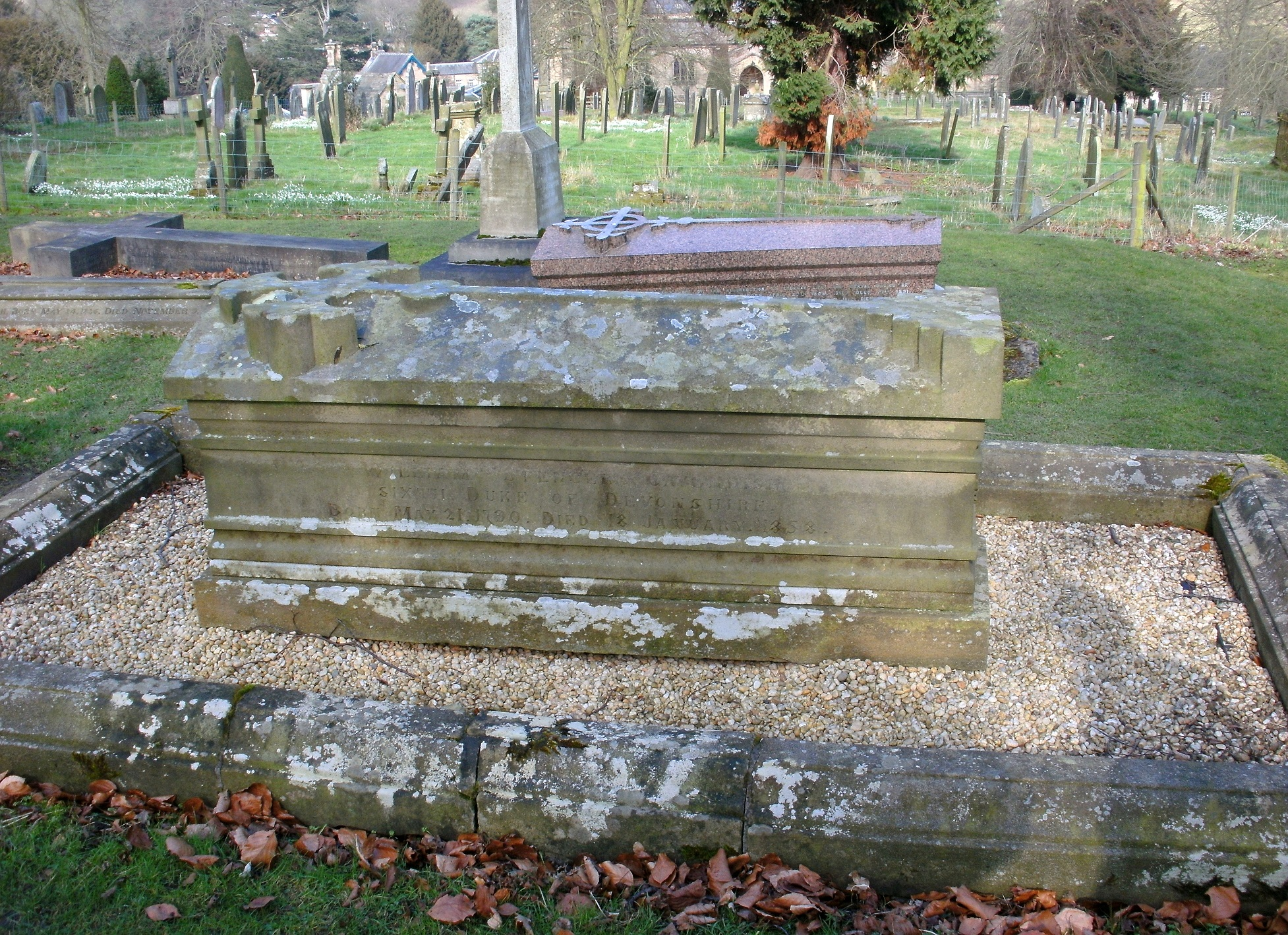
Grave of the 6th Duke (d. 1858)

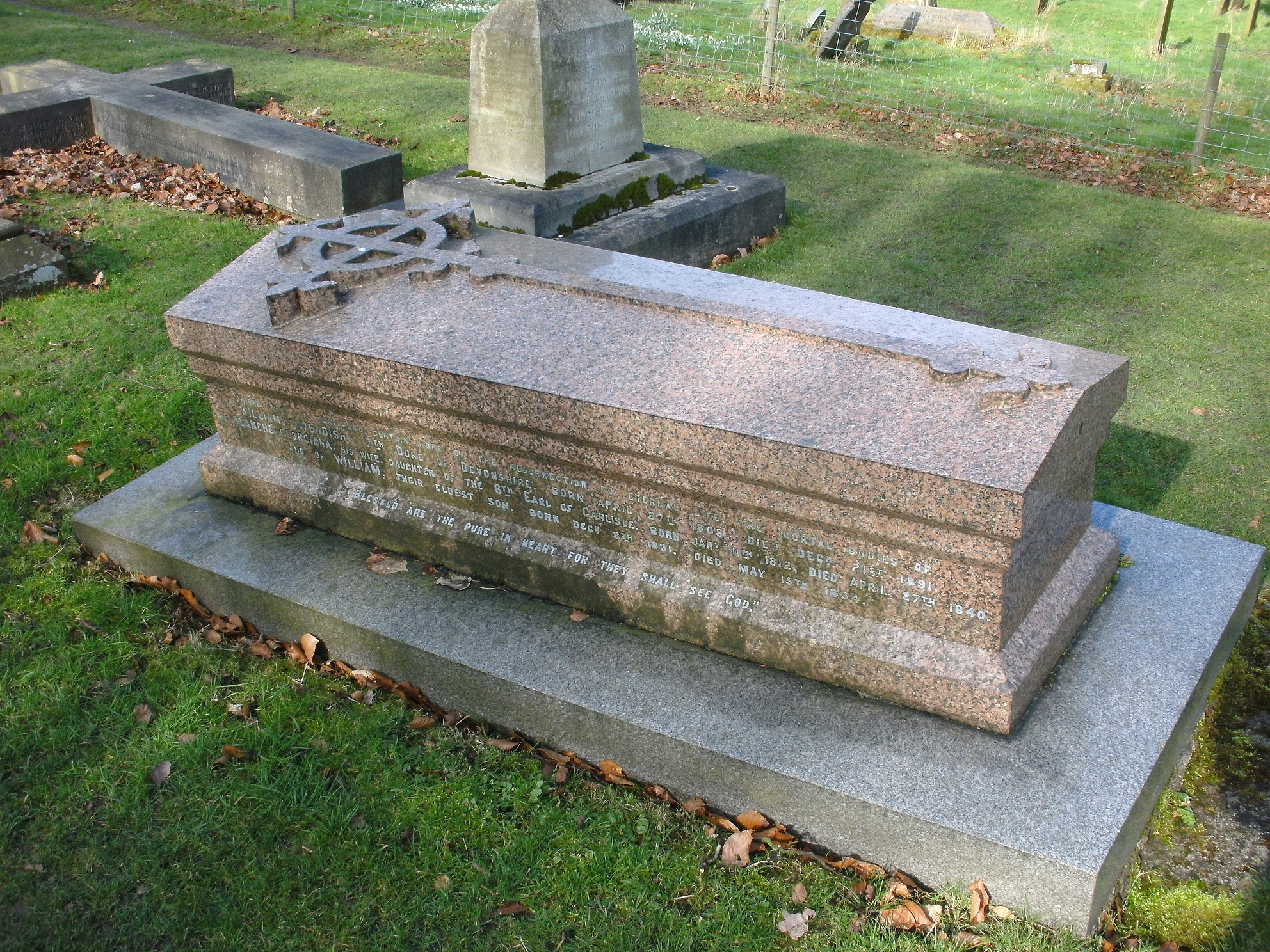
Grave of the 7th Duke (d. 1891)

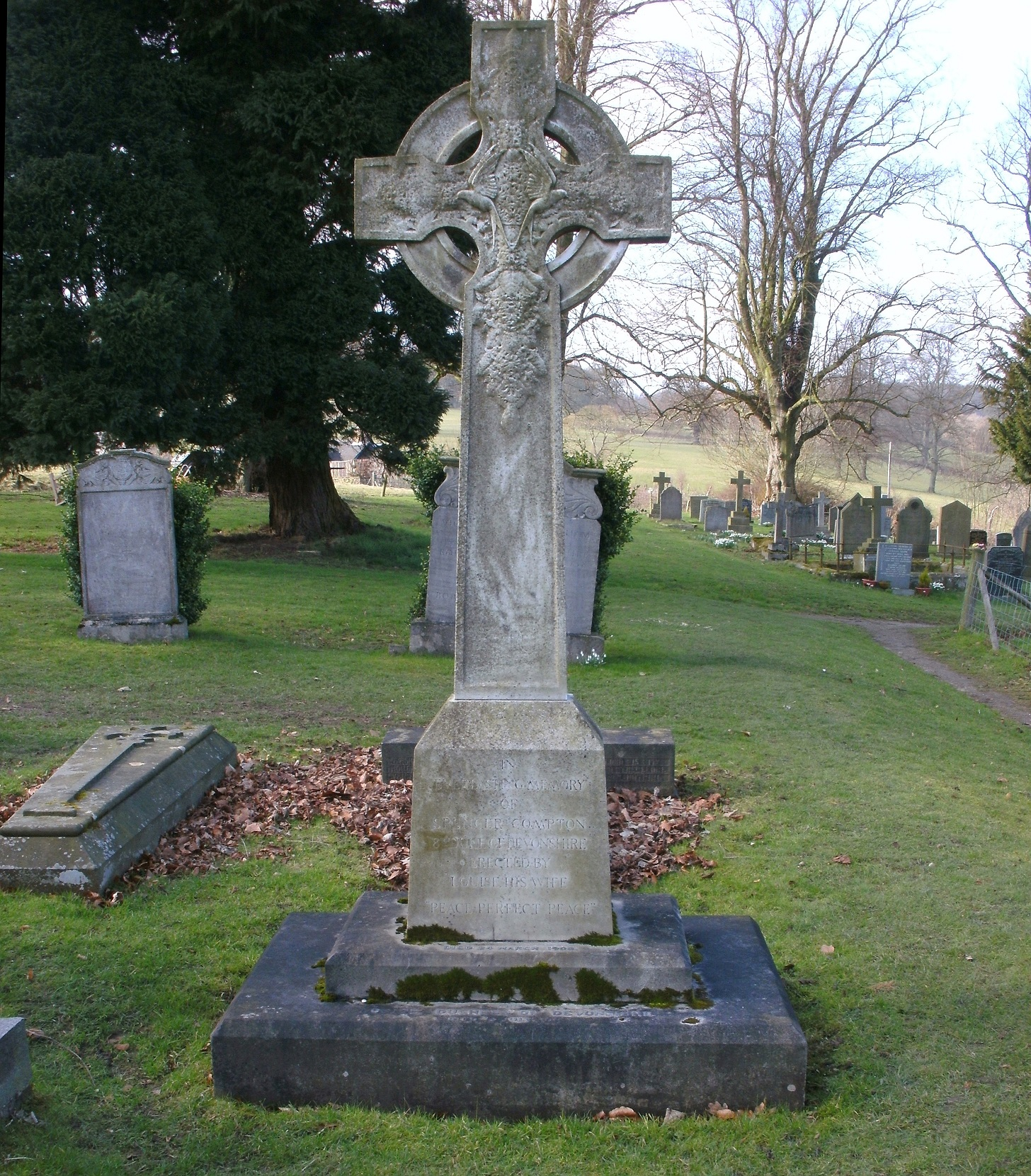
Grave of the 8th Duke (d. 1908)

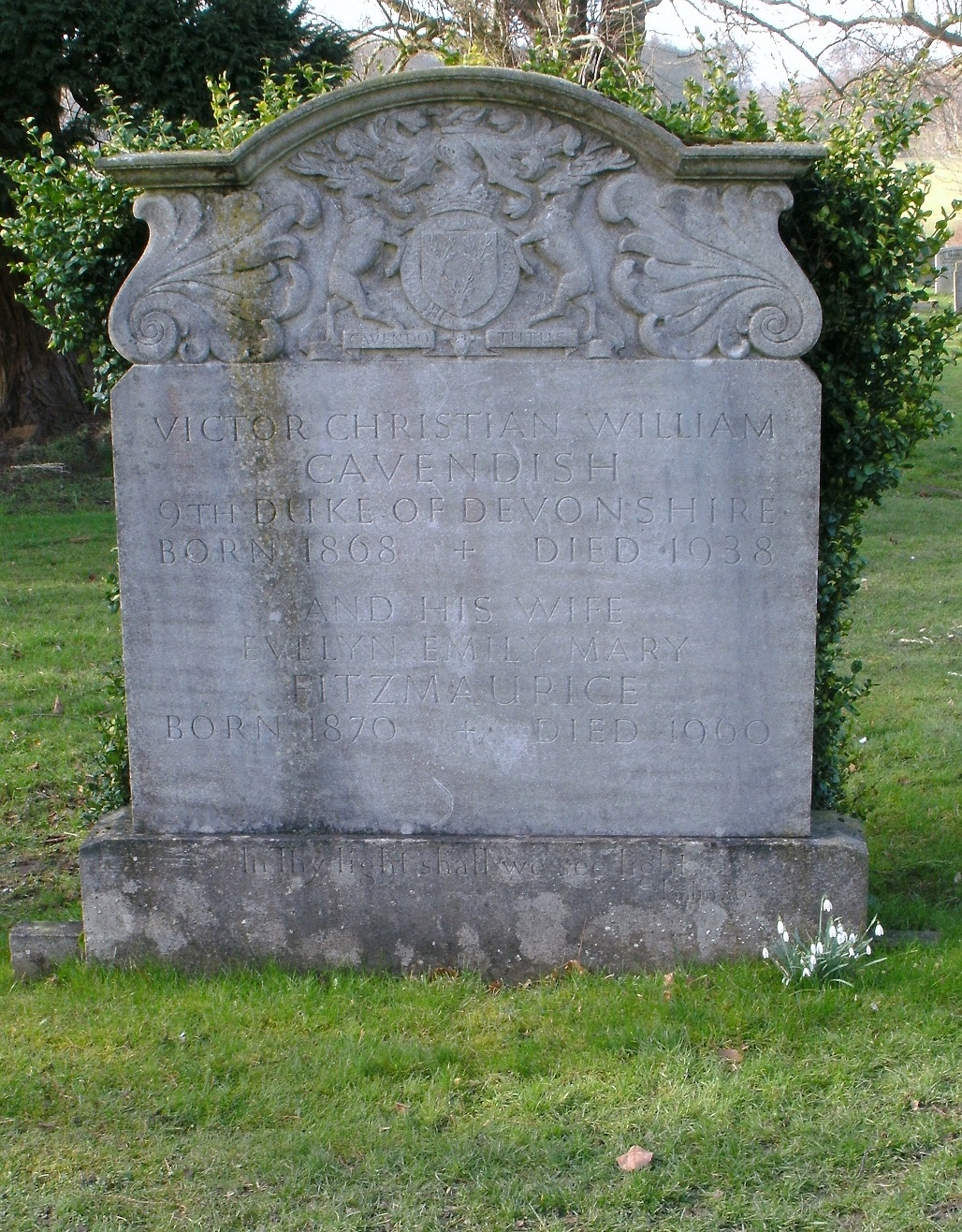
Grave of the 9th Duke (d. 1938)

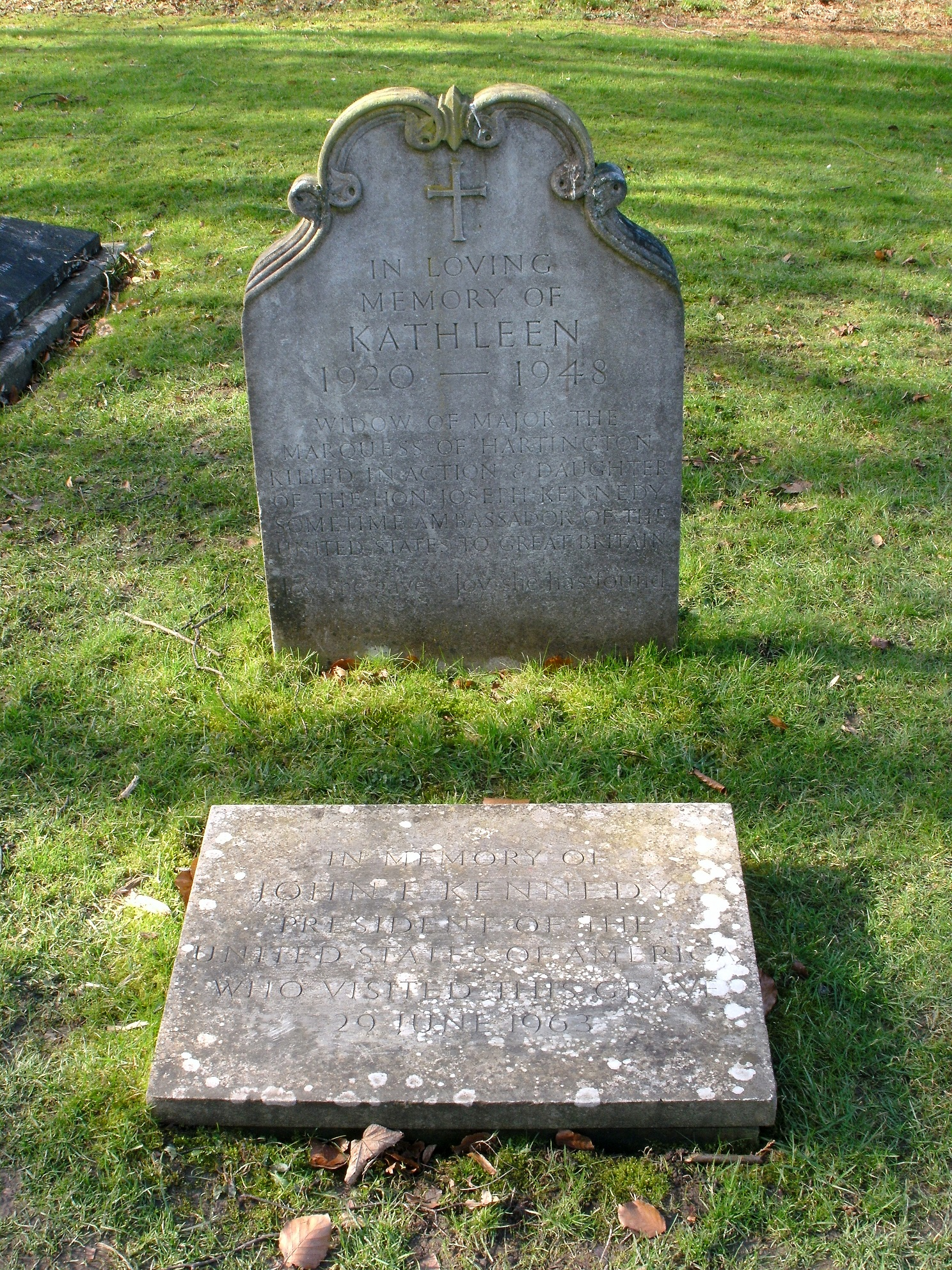
Grave of Kathleen Cavendish, Marchioness of Hartington (née Kennedy, 1920–1948)

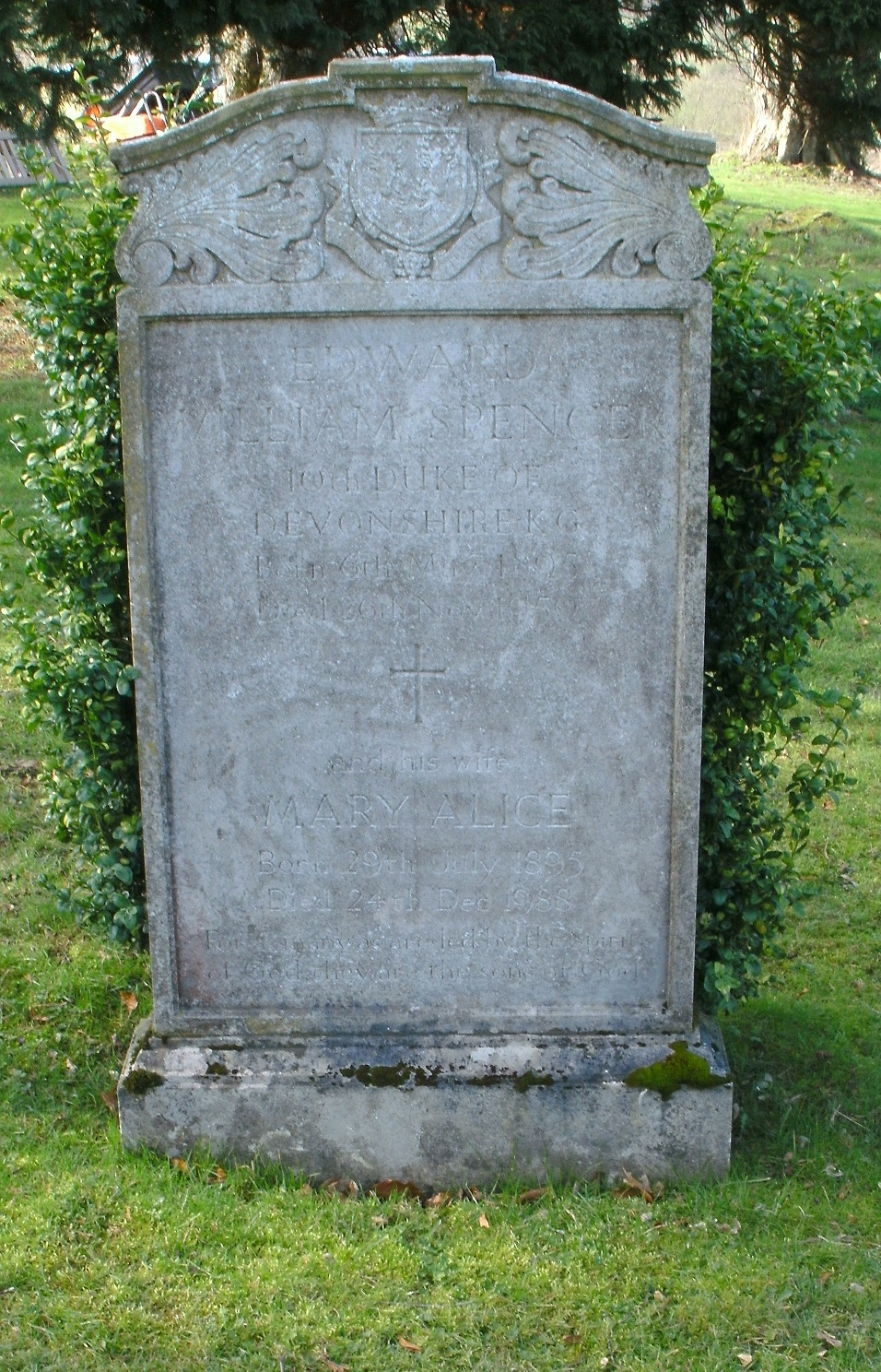
Grave of the 10th Duke (d. 1950)

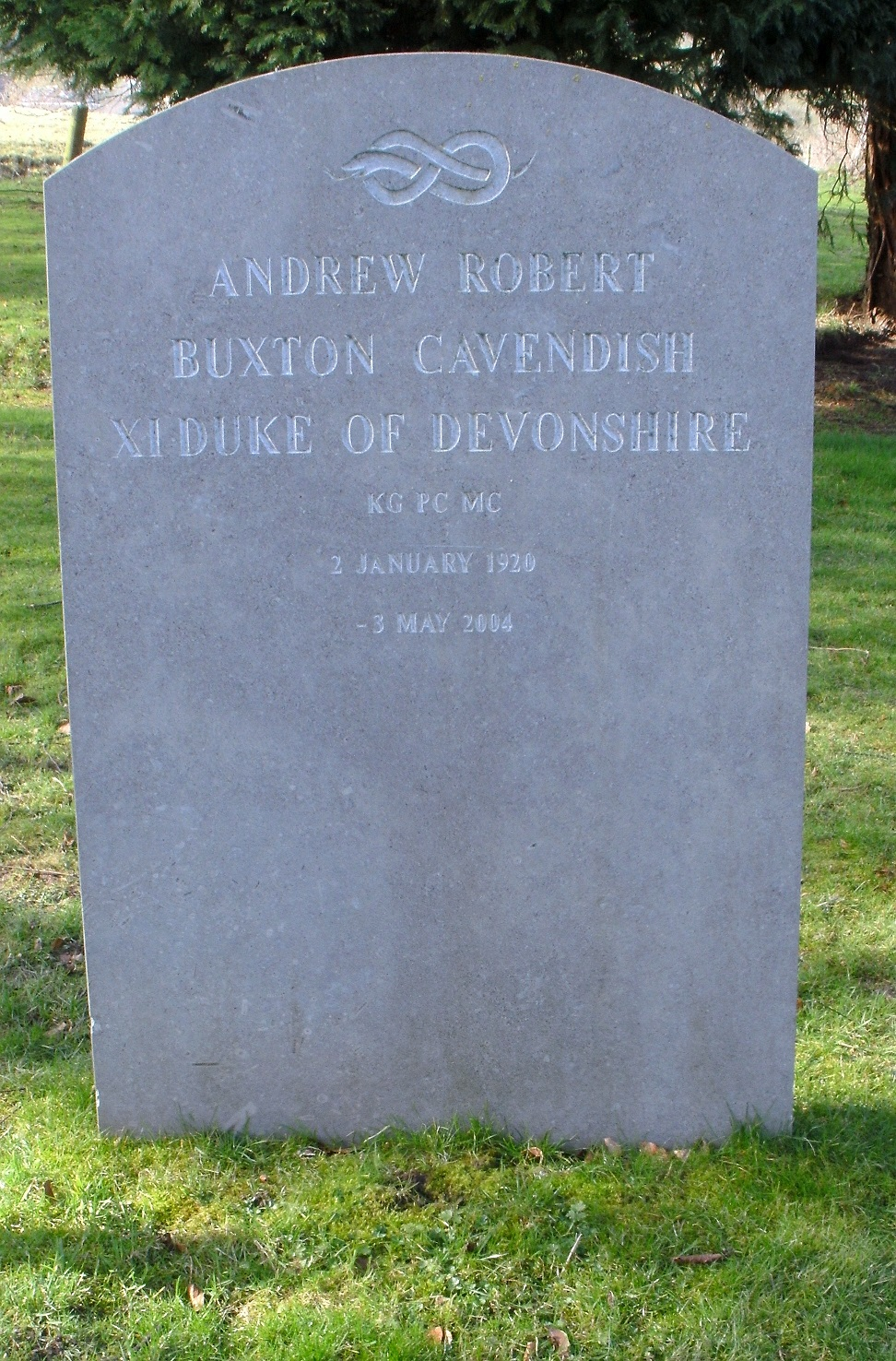
Grave of the 11th Duke (d. 2004)
