= Edensor =

Village in Derbyshire, England

Coordinates: 53.227°N 1.625°W

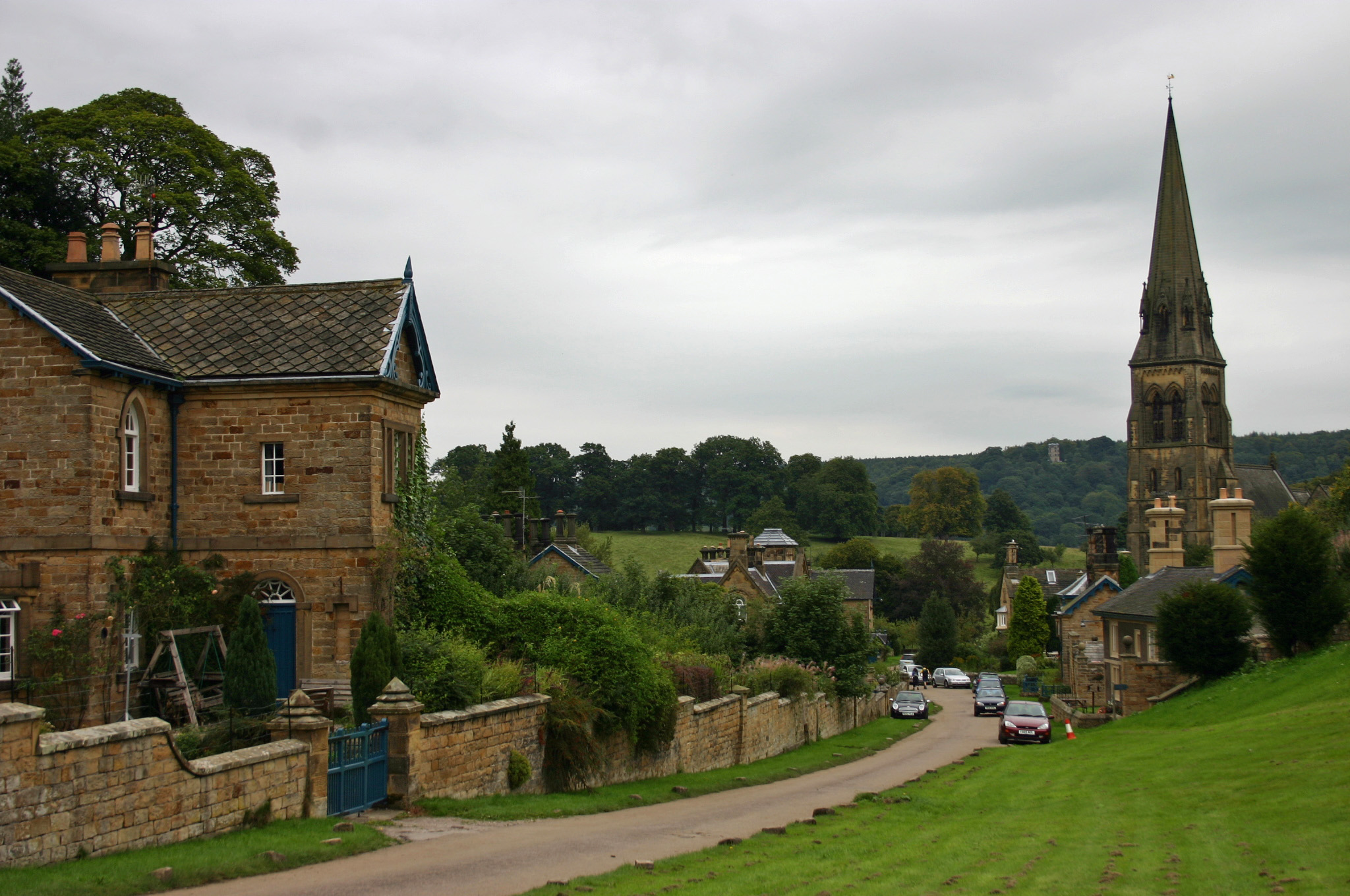
- Edensor

- Location within Derbyshire
- Population: 145 (2011)
- OS grid reference: SK251700
- District: Derbyshire Dales
- Shire county: Derbyshire
- Region: East Midlands
- Country: England
- Sovereign state: United Kingdom
- Post town: BAKEWELL
- Postcode district: DE45
- Dialling code: 01629
- Police: Derbyshire
- Fire: Derbyshire
- Ambulance: East Midlands
- UK Parliament: Derbyshire Dales

Edensor (pronounced /ˈɛnzər/) is a village and civil parish in Derbyshire, England. The population of the civil parish at the 2011 census was 145.

Much of the village is privately owned by the Cavendish family, as the Dukes of Devonshire. Most of the deceased of the family are buried in the churchyard of St Peter's Church.

== History ==
A village near this location was included in the Domesday Book of 1086. At that time, it was owned by Henry de Ferrers and included ten villagers plus seven "smallholders". One report describes the area in the early 1700s as: "it straggled across towards the river Derwent in front of Chatsworth, skirting the hill opposite the village known as 'The Crobbs'."

In 1762 the 4th Duke of Devonshire of Chatsworth House arranged for the demolition of several buildings because they intruded on his view of the parkland that had been created by Capability Brown. In the 1800s, a new road was being built and the Duke arranged to have the rest of the village removed. A new village was constructed in a project managed by Sir Joseph Paxton; the earlier vicarage and an existing 18th-century inn were moved to the new site. One building of the old village, Park Cottage, was not removed. A church existed here in the 1100s but it was rebuilt and increased in size in the mid-1800s.

A report published in 1870 stated that the village was "a pretty place of villa-cottages" and had a post office and an inn, as well as 123 houses". The population of the township, including the village, was 592.

In 2019 some 575 people worked on the Chatsworth Estate which included the village. This area has been the home of the Cavendish family since 1549.

By the mid-1800s, Edensor was considered to be a "model village"; "rules were being enforced to preserve the appearance of the settlement". The Chatsworth Estate office occupies a "fine brick building" which was built as an inn for visitors to Chatsworth in the 18th century and attributed to James Paine. As of 2021, 50 of the buildings in the village are listed buildings, all Grade II (with a few at Grade II*) except for the Church of St Peter which is Grade I Listed.

The village forms part of the Chatsworth Estate; the ownership is held by The Chatsworth House Trust on behalf of the Cavendish family.

== St Peter's Church ==
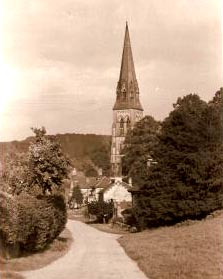
The church, circa 1870s)

St Peter's is the parish church in the Church of England. It is in a joint parish with St Anne's Church, Beeley. Sir Joseph Paxton (d. 1865) is buried in St Peter's churchyard, as are most Dukes of Devonshire and their families.

A 2020 report states that the current church with its 166-foot-high (51 m) spire, designed by George Gilbert Scott, was not built until about 25 years after the village was completed. It was a "replacement for the original squat-towered church that had occupied the site previously". Derbyshire Council states that "Edensor Church was taken down and rebuilt in 1867, incorporating some of the old Norman" church. Another source specifies that "very little remains of the Norman church".

The historic listing summary for the Church of St Peter provides less of an explanation. It simply states that St Peter's was built in the 12th century, modified in the 15th and "rebuilt in 1867".

== Dunsa ==
The hamlet of Dunsa lies to the northwest of Edensor at grid reference SK245704.

== Gallery ==
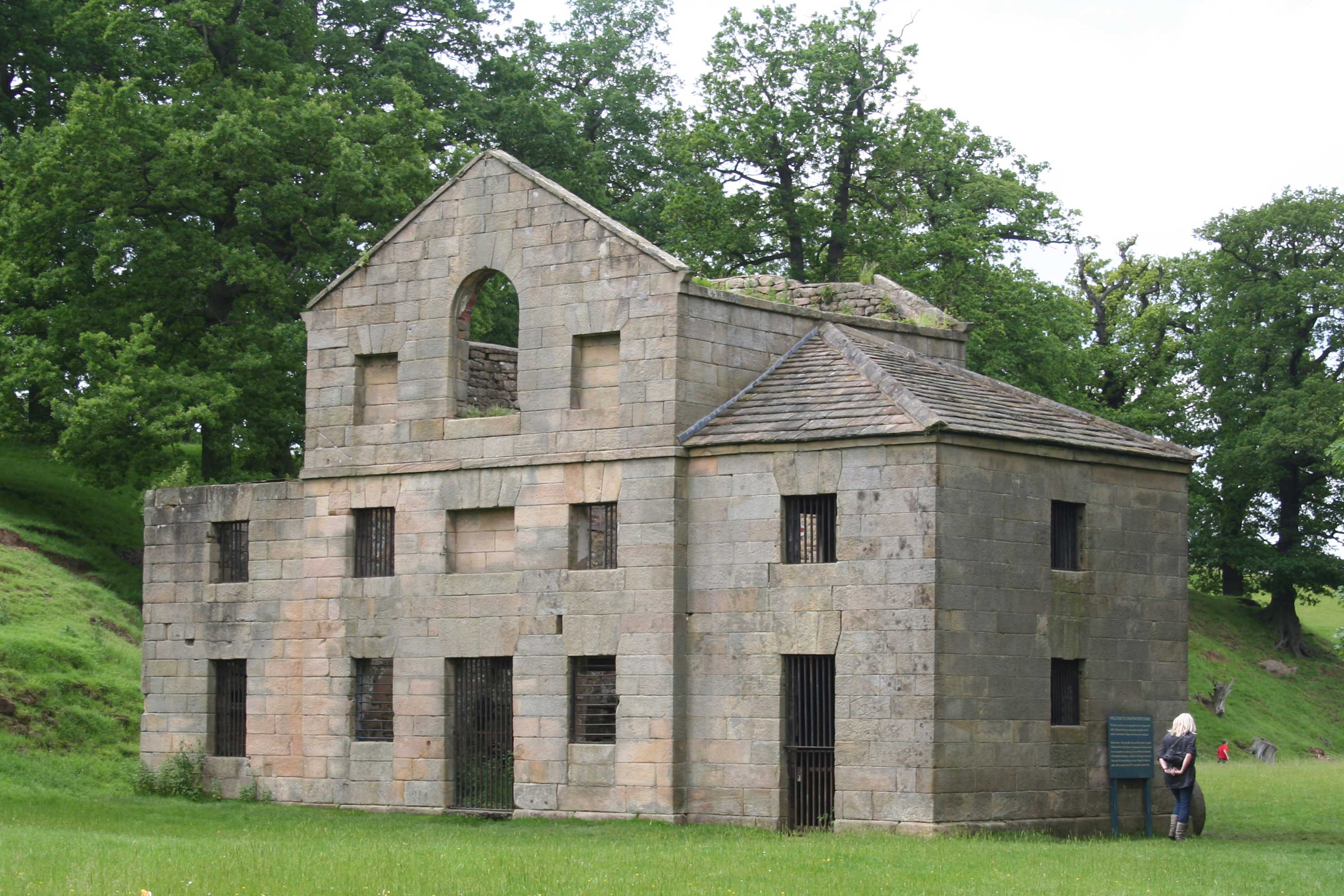
Edensor Mill, Grade II listed, built in 1762

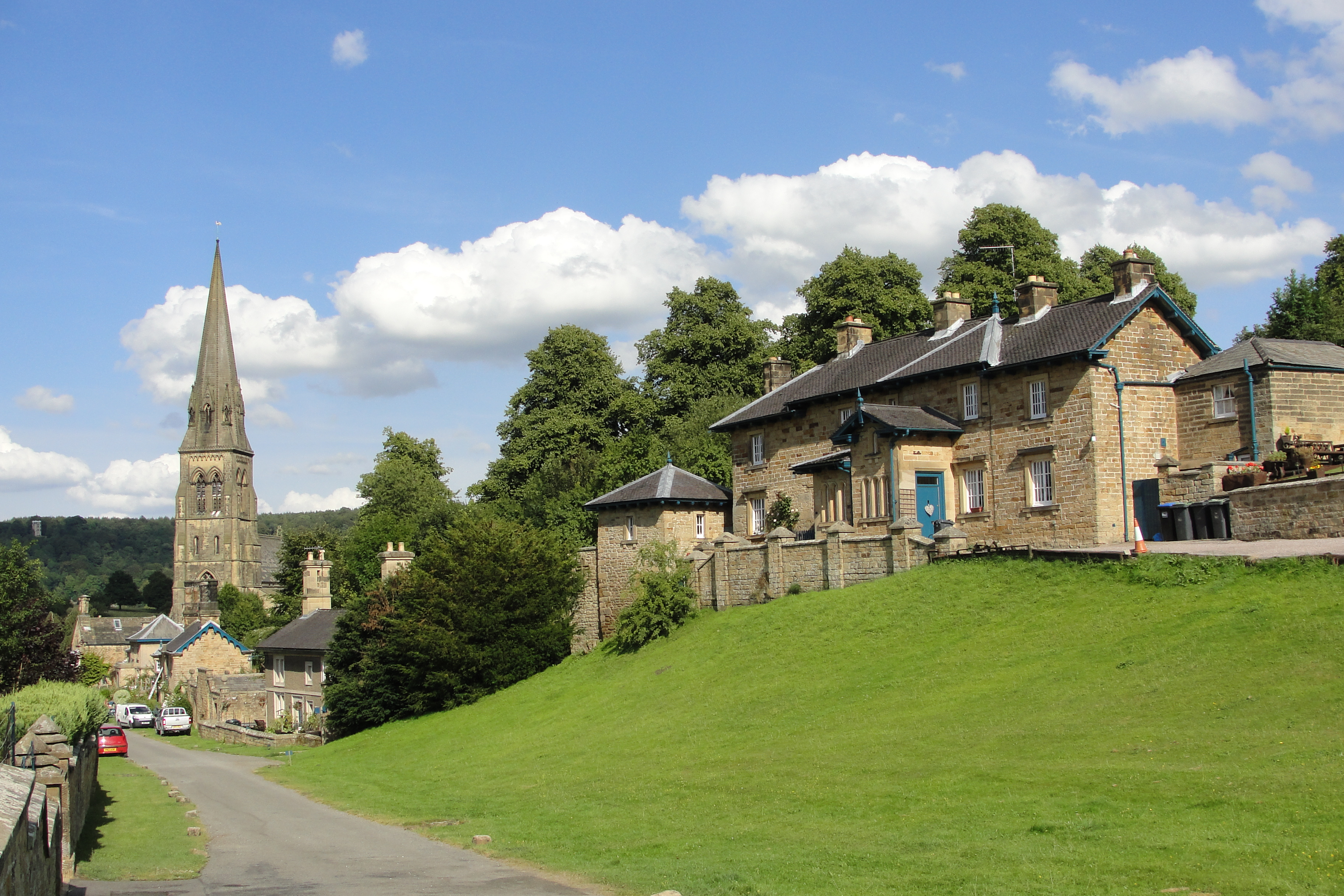
Edensor, Chatsworth Estate

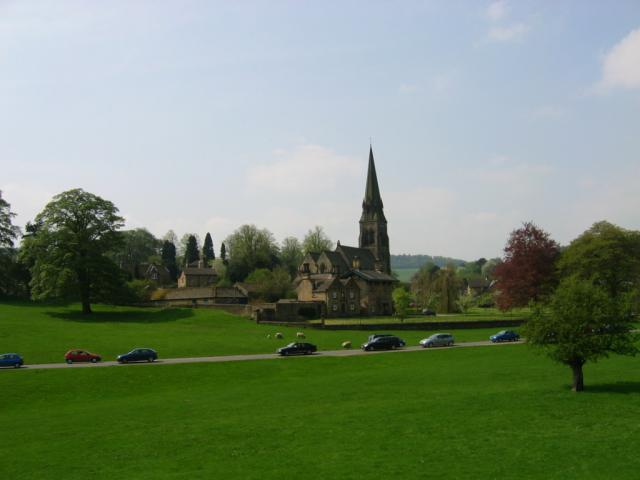
Approaching from Chatsworth

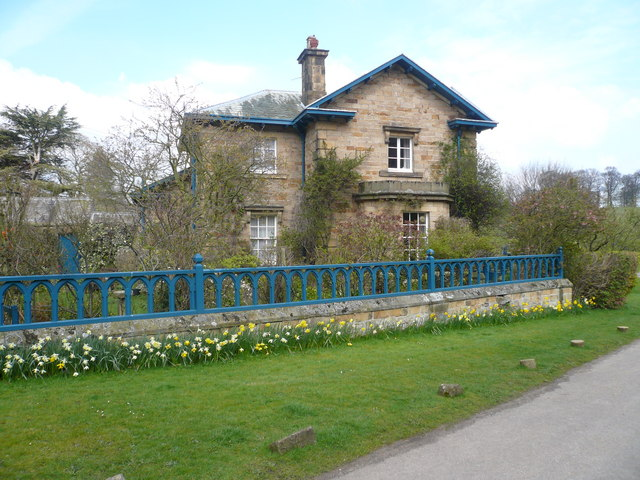
Village scene

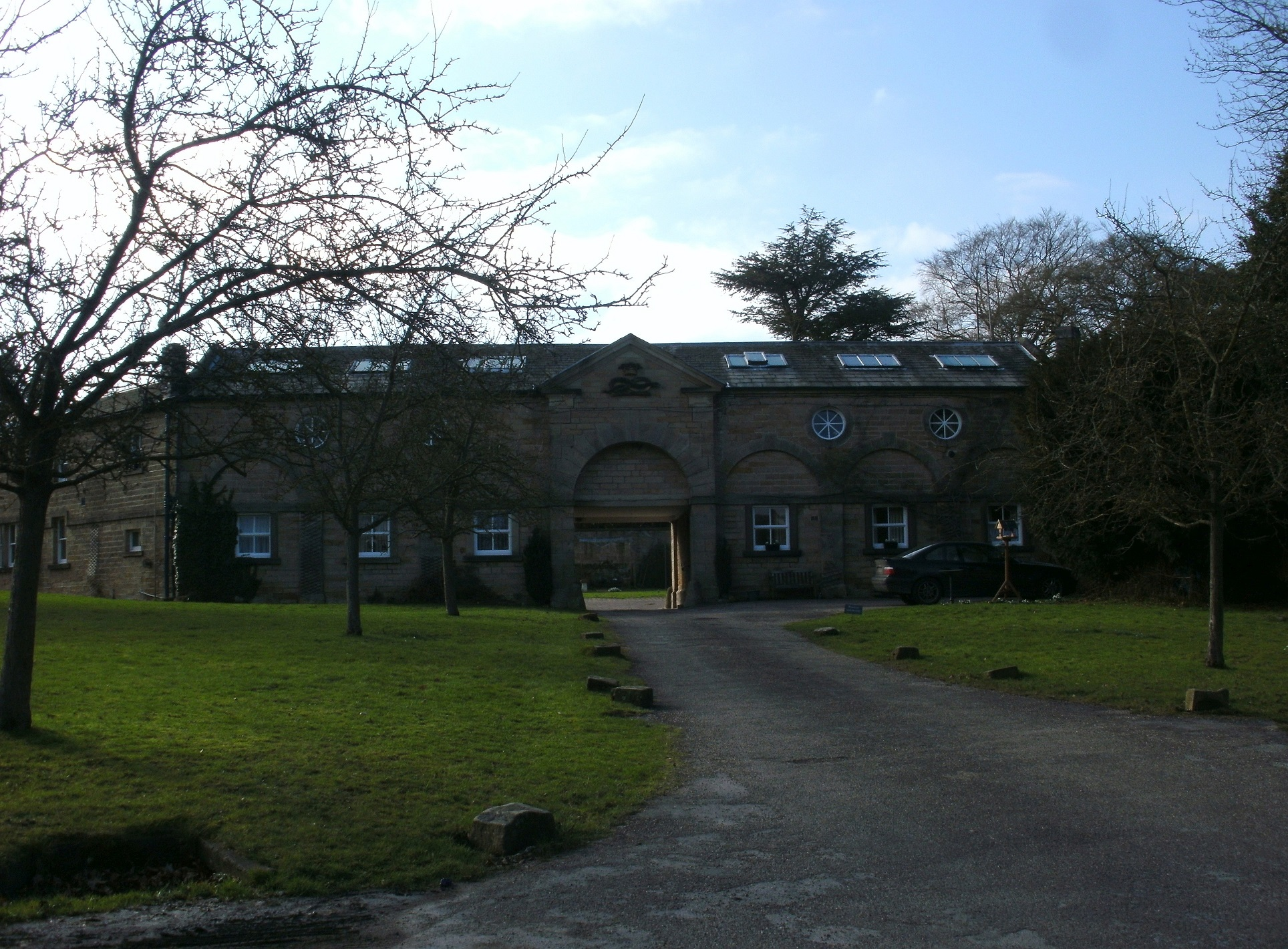
Devonshire building

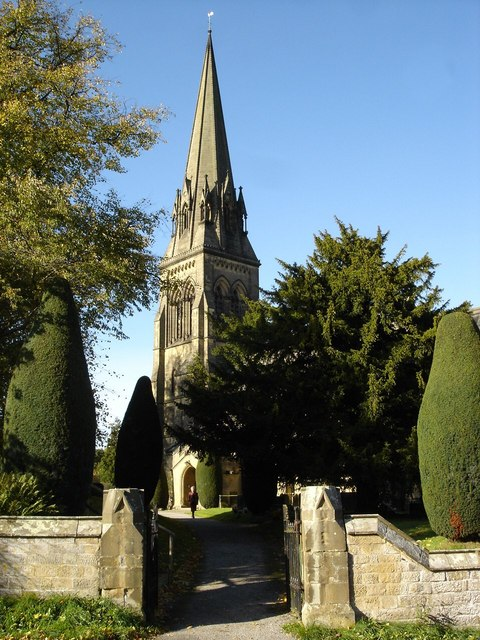
St Peter's Church

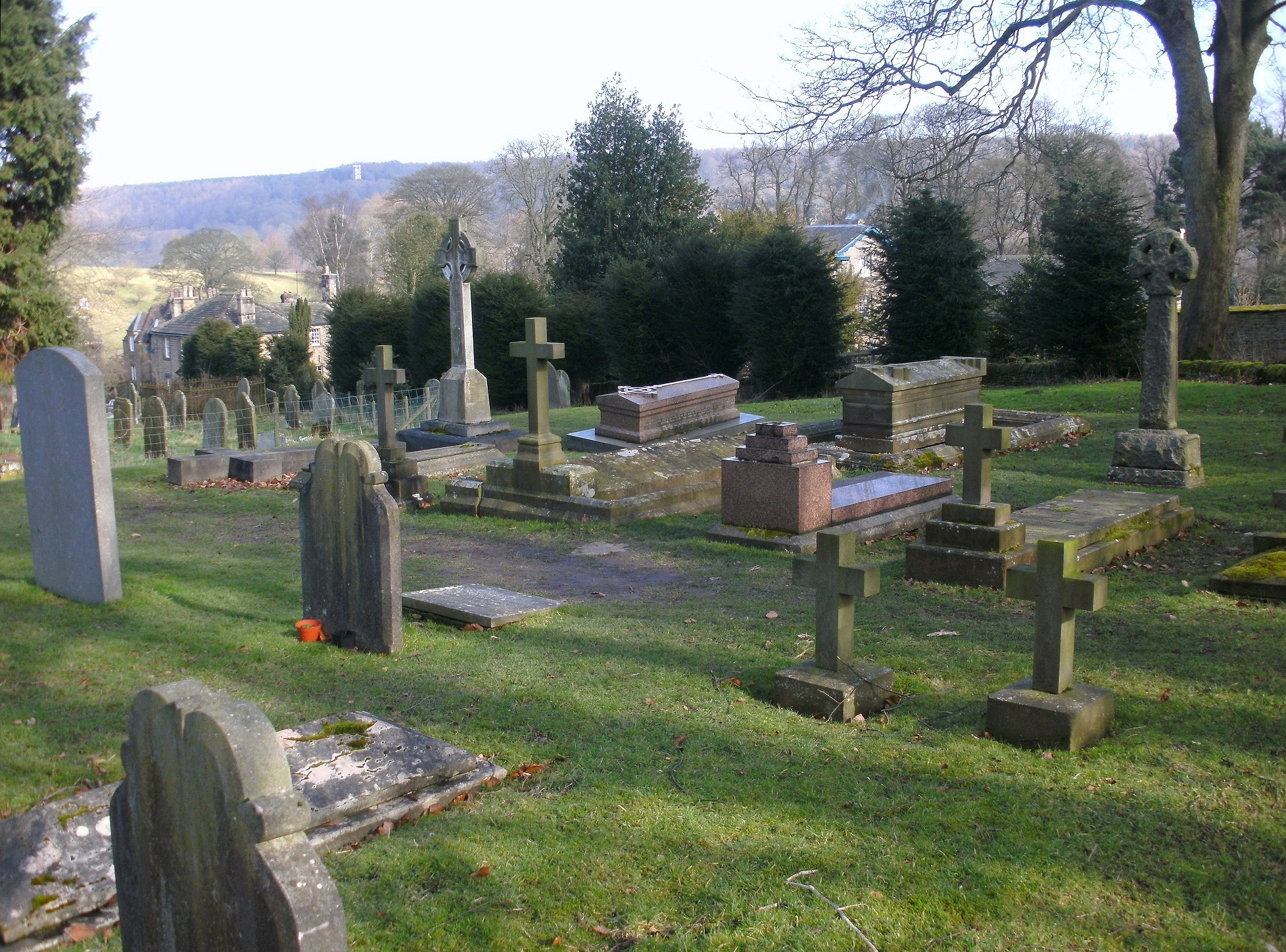
Cavendish family plot with the graves of the Dukes of Devonshire

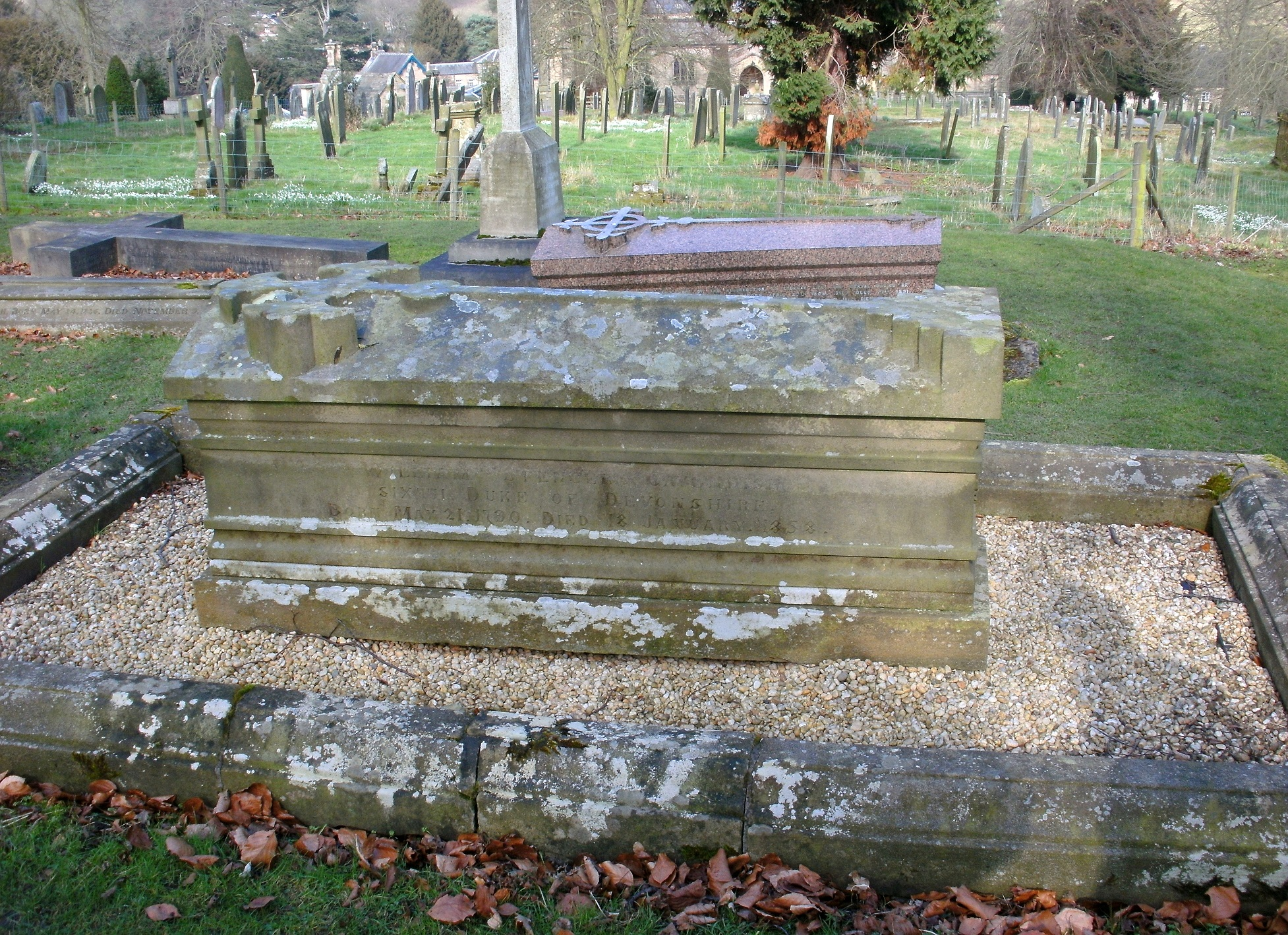
Grave of the 6th Duke of Devonshire (d. 1858), founder of modern-day Edensor

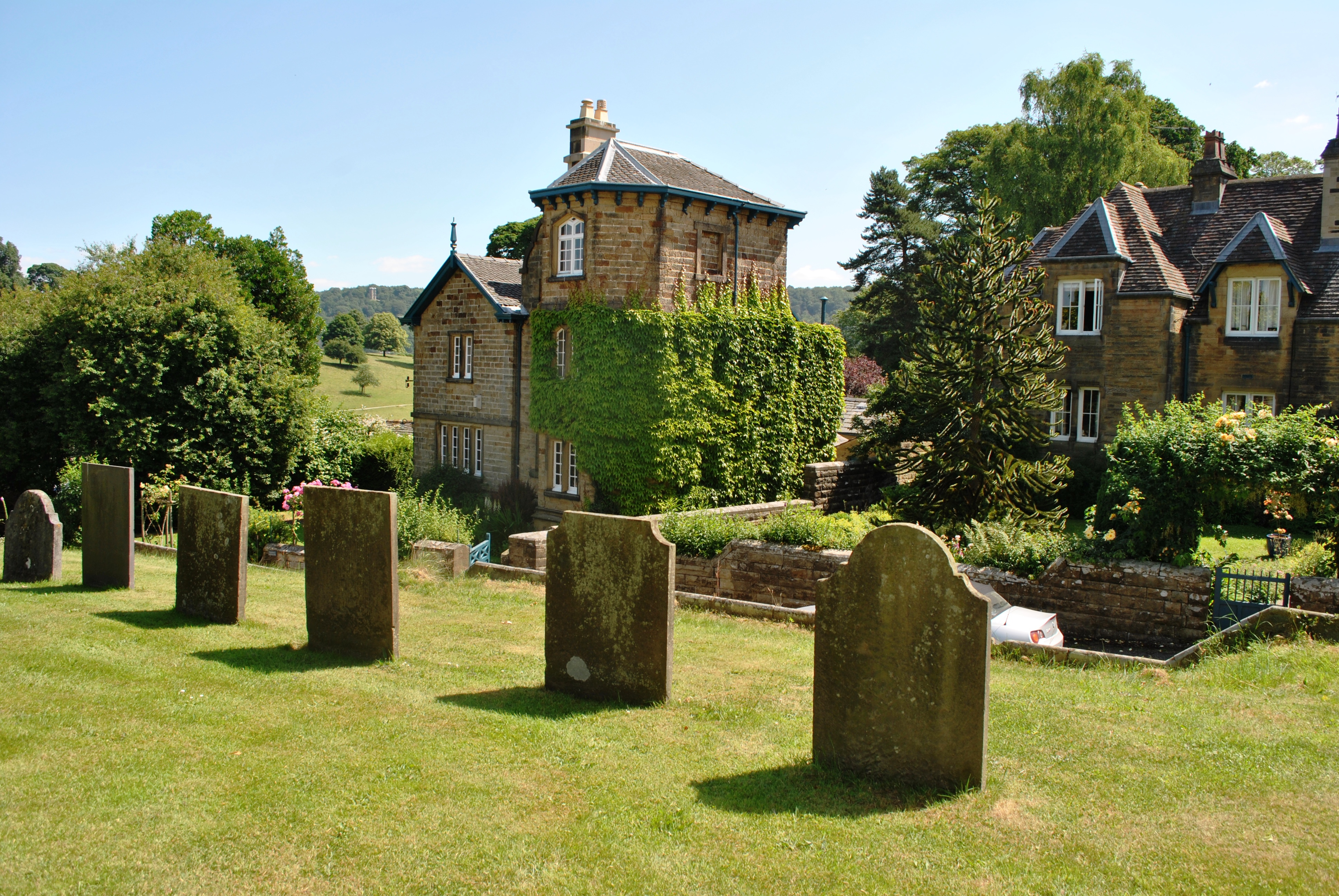

== See also ==
- Listed buildings in Edensor
- Beeley – another Chatsworth estate village
- Pilsley – also a Chatsworth estate village
- Milton Abbas – a village in Dorset that was moved by a landowner
