= Listed buildings in Edensor =

Edensor is a civil parish in the Derbyshire Dales district of Derbyshire, England. The parish contains 50 listed buildings that are recorded on the National Heritage List for England. Of these, one is listed at Grade I, the highest of the three grades, six are at Grade II*, the middle grade, and the others are at Grade II, the lowest grade. The parish contains the model village of Edensor, which was created by Joseph Paxton for the 6th Duke of Devonshire, and the surrounding area. Most of the listed buildings are houses, cottages and associated structures, mainly within the village. The other listed buildings include a church, a cross and a tomb in the churchyard, a guidestone, a bridge, a former cotton mill, a hotel and a stable block converted for other uses, an ornamental fountain, a water trough, the wall and railings enclosing the village, and a telephone kiosk.

== Key ==
| Grade | Criteria |
|---|---|
| I | Buildings of exceptional interest, sometimes considered to be internationally important |
| II* | Particularly important buildings of more than special interest |
| II | Buildings of national importance and special interest |

== Buildings ==
| Name and location | Photograph | Date | Notes | Grade |
|---|---|---|---|---|
| St Peter's Church; 53.22562°N 1.62604°W | | 12th century | The church was largely rebuilt in 1864–70 by George Gilbert Scott, retaining some earlier features. It is built in sandstone with Westmorland slate roofs, and consists of a nave with a south clerestory, north and south aisles, north and south porches, a chancel with a north vestry and southeast chapel, and a west steeple. The steeple has a tower with four stages, angle buttresses, a southeast stair turret, a three-light west window, lancet windows, and a clock face. The bell openings are paired, above them is an arched corbel table, and a broach spire with canopied niches, and lucarnes with gables and pinnacles. | I |
| Churchyard cross and sundial 53.22544°N 1.62577°W | | 14th century | The cross and sundial are in the churchyard of St Peter's Church. The structure is in sandstone, and has a square plan. It consists of the base of a medieval cross on three steps, on which is a Tuscan column with a sundial on the top. | II |
| Calton Lees House; 53.20943°N 1.61571°W | | 17th century (possible) | The house is in sandstone with sill and lintel bands and a stone slate roof. There are two storeys, a T-shaped plan and a symmetrical north front of five bays. The central doorway has a moulded eaved surround, a rectangular fanlight with a mullion, and a hood mould. The windows are sashes, and in the rear wing is a massive cruck truss. | II |
| Post Office and cottage 53.22579°N 1.62517°W | — | 17th century | A pair of cottages that were remodelled in about 1830–40, they are in sandstone, and have a tile roof with coped gables, plain kneelers, and ball finials. There are two storeys and an irregular front of four bays. Most of the windows are casements, and there is a round window, two bay windows, mullioned windows, and a gabled half-dormer. | II |
| Thatch Meadow; 53.24065°N 1.62675°W | | 17th century (possible) | The cottage is in sandstone with quoins, and a roof of thatch and stone slate. There are two storeys and three bays. On the front is an off-centre porch, and the windows are mullioned. | II |
| Guidestone; 53.22391°N 1.64873°W | | 1709 | The guidestone at a road junction is in sandstone. It consists of a square post inscribed with pointing hands, and indicating the roads to Bakewell and to Chesterfield. | II |
| Italian Villa; 53.22598°N 1.62489°W | | Early 18th century | The house, which was remodelled in about 1830–40, is in sandstone on a chamfered plinth, with quoins, and an overhanging Welsh slate roof on massive paired wooden brackets. It is in Swiss chalet style. There are three storeys, and a north front of three bays. The central doorway has an architrave, and is flanked by cross casement windows with moulded surrounds. In front is an open timber porch with a balustrade. The central bay in the middle floor contains a blocked doorway with a moulded architrave and a segmental pediment, and the windows in the outer bays of both floors have moulded surrounds and two lights with mullions. | II* |
| Calton Lees Farmhouse; 53.20966°N 1.61653°W | | 18th century | The farmhouse is in sandstone with quoins and a Welsh slate roof. There are two storeys, two bays, and a lower bay to the left. The doorway has a moulded surround, some of the windows are mullioned with moulded surrounds, and the others are sashes. | II |
| Moor View, Calton Lees; 53.20944°N 1.61644°W | | 18th century | A sandstone cottage with a sill band and a Welsh slate roof. There are two storeys, two bays, and a recessed bay on the left. The doorway has stone jambs and a lintel, and the windows are mullioned with two lights. | II |
| Park View; 53.22595°N 1.62472°W | | 18th century | The house, which was remodelled in about 1830–40, is in sandstone on a chamfered plinth, with quoins, and a stone slate roof with coped gables and moulded kneelers. There are two storeys, three bays, and two gables on the front. Steps lead up to the central doorway that has a moulded architrave and a bracketed hood mould. The windows are cross windows with moulded surrounds, those in the upper floor with Gothic glazing and stepped hood moulds. Above, in the centre, is a shield in relief, there is a similar shield in the left gable, and in the right gable is a blind Gothic niche. | II |
| The Old Vicarage; 53.22480°N 1.62543°W | — | 18th century | A house, remodelled and converted into a vicarage in 1838, and later two houses. It is in sandstone with floor bands, and a Welsh slate roof with overhanging eaves on paired brackets. There are two and three storeys, and an irregular front of six bays. The porch has a moulded shouldered arch, a keystone, and a moulded cornice, and the windows in the house are sashes. In the right return is a full-height canted bay window. | II |
| One Arch Bridge; 53.21243°N 1.61106°W | | 1759–60 | The bridge, which was designed by James Paine, carries the B6012 road over the River Derwent. It is in sandstone and consists of a single round arch with a hood mould. On each bank is a triangular buttress, and the parapet has a plain band and chamfered coping, rising to the centre. The bridge is flanked by walls, the northeast wall containing a doorway with a rusticated surround. | II* |
| Edensor Mill; 53.21533°N 1.61325°W | | 1761–62 | A cotton mill designed by James Paine, now a ruin. It is in sandstone, with the remaining roof in stone slate. There are five bays, the middle three bays projecting and gabled, with three storeys, and the outer bays with two storeys. The upper window in the middle bay has a round arch, and all the other windows and the doorways have flat heads and wedge lintels. | II |
| Bridge House; 53.21237°N 1.61188°W | | Late 18th century | The house is in sandstone with sill bands, and a roof of Welsh slate and stone slate with coped gables and moulded kneelers. There are two storeys, an irregular north front of four bays, and a single-storey gatekeeper's lodge. On the front is a doorway with a plain surround, and a canted bay window. The other windows are sashes, and on the east front are twin gables. | II |
| Park Rangers House; 53.22896°N 1.62676°W | — | Late 18th century | The house is in sandstone with a hipped Welsh slate roof. There are two storeys and five bays, the middle bay projecting, with a pediment containing an oculus over the middle three bays. The outer bays contain blind round-arched panels with an impost band, and a balustraded parapet. In the middle bay is a doorway with a fanlight flanked by round-arched sash windows, and in the upper floor is a sash window, a casement window, and oculi. The other bays contain sash windows, in the ground floor with round-arched heads and in the upper floor with segmental heads. | II |
| Chatsworth Estate Office and Village Institute; 53.22827°N 1.62674°W | | 1776–77 | A hotel designed by Joseph Pickford, enlarged in 1912, and converted for other uses. It is in red brick, on a stone plinth, with a sill band, a dentilled cornice, a moulded cornice, and hipped and gabled Welsh slate roofs. The original part has a symmetrical front of five bays, the outer bays projecting under pediments, and with two storeys. The middle three bays have two storeys and attics, and contain a central porch with Tuscan Doric columns, and paired pilasters. The doorway has a round-arched head, a traceried fanlight, and reindeer heads in the spandrels. In the lower floor of the outer bays are Venetian windows with keystones, and the windows elsewhere are sashes. The pavilion later added to the left is rendered, and has pilasters, a moulded parapet, partly balustraded, and a pyramidal roof. It contains a round-arched doorway and oculi. | II* |
| Cavendish Flats; 53.22638°N 1.62590°W | | Early 19th century | A stable block converted into flats, it is in sandstone, and has Welsh slate roofs with coped gables and moulded kneelers. There are two storeys, and three canted ranges. The central range has quoins, and contains an arcade of seven round arches. The middle bay projects under an open pediment on pilasters with triglyphs, and contains a crest. The bay has a round-arched carriage entrance with a blind tympanum, the flanking arches have an impost band forming lintels to casement windows, and above are two circular windows. | II |
| Dunsa Kennel Cottages and outbuildings 53.22934°N 1.63227°W | — | Early 19th century | A row of cottages with ranges of farm buildings at the rear. They are in sandstone with quoins, and stone slate roofs with coped gables and moulded kneelers. The cottages have two storeys and a front of six bays. The openings consist of doorways with quoined surrounds, sash windows, and a casement window. At the rear is a long range of former cart sheds, with the openings blocked, and a two-storey range at right angles to them, containing cart entrances with keystones, and doorways. | II |
| Park House; 53.22586°N 1.62233°W | | Early 19th century | A sandstone house that has a tile roof with coped gables and plain kneelers. There are two storeys and two bays. The central doorway has a bracketed hood, and the windows are sashes. | II |
| The Vicarage; 53.22514°N 1.62547°W | — | Early 19th century | The vicarage is in sandstone with angle quoins, a sill band, and a hipped stone slate roof. There are two storeys and three bays. The central doorway has a moulded surround, a semicircular fanlight, and a pediment, and the windows are sashes. | II |
| 1 and 2 Daisy Bank, wall and outbuilding 53.22499°N 1.62809°W | | c. 1830–40 | A pair of houses incorporating earlier material, in Italianate style. They are in sandstone with a tile roof, hipped and gabled, on timber brackets. There are two storeys, and an irregular north front with five bays. On the front are two projecting bays, gabled with decorative bargeboards and finials, the right bay taller. Each bay contains a triple window with round-arched lights, and a single light above in the right bay. Elsewhere there are casement windows, those in the ground floor with hood moulds. To the north is a retaining wall containing seven piers with pyramidal caps, and a square outhouse with a pyramidal roof. | II |
| Bank Top; 53.22501°N 1.62957°W | — | c. 1830–40 | A sandstone cottage that has an overhanging Welsh slate roof with decorative brackets. There is a single storey, an L-shaped plan, and a front of two bays, the left bay projecting and gabled. In the angle is a latticework timber porch, and the windows are cross windows. | II |
| Barbrook Cottage; 53.22481°N 1.62917°W | | c. 1830–40 | The house is in sandstone, and has a Welsh slate roof with overhanging gables, decorative bargeboards, and gableted timber finials. There are two storeys, two bays, and a recessed bay on the right. The doorway has a bracketed stone hood with decorative scrollwork and two carved heads, and above it is a sunken panel with a shield in relief. Most of the windows are casements with hood moulds, and in the right bay is a window with pointed arched lights. The north gable end has a doorway with a pointed head. | II |
| Church View and walls 53.22589°N 1.62642°W | | c. 1830–40 | A sandstone house with quoins, and a tile roof with coped gables, moulded kneelers, finials, and decorative bargeboards. There is a T-shaped plan with two and three storeys. On the south front is a gabled porch and a verandah, and windows with pointed arches. The east front has a bay window with a moulded parapet, and on this front the windows are mullioned. Attached to the house are low coped walls with square piers and a Gothic timber fence. | II |
| Deerlands, Coombe Cottage and Guide Cottage; 53.22562°N 1.62651°W | | c. 1830–40 | A group of three sandstone cottages, partly rendered, with hipped and gabled roofs in Welsh slate, stone slate, and tile, with coped gables and moulded kneelers. They are in two and three storeys and have an irregular plan and elevations. The doorways have moulded surrounds, most of the windows are casements, and there is a canted oriel window, and a gabled half-dormer with decorative bargeboards. | II |
| School House and walls 53.22602°N 1.62616°W | | c. 1830–40 | A sandstone house on a plinth, with quoins, and a Welsh slate roof with overhanging bracketed eaves. There are two storeys and three bays, the left bay projecting under a gable with an open pediment. In the middle bay is a porch with a cornice and blocking course. The ground floor windows are sashes with bracketed hoods, and in the upper floor are casement windows, the one in the left bay with a bracketed hood. In the south front is a pedimented gable and a canted bay window. At the northeast corner is a round-arched doorway, and a low coped wall with square piers, to the south with a Gothic timber fence. | II |
| Shepherds Cottage; 53.22523°N 1.62775°W | — | c. 1830–40 | The house is in sandstone with floor and eaves bands, and a tile roof with gables and decorative bargeboards. There are two storeys and three bays. The doorway and the windows, most of which are mullioned, have moulded surrounds. | II |
| Sunny Bank and Rose Cottage; 53.22554°N 1.62780°W | | c. 1830–40 | A pair of sandstone houses with banded quoins and a stone slate roof. There are two storeys and three bays. In the centre is a porch with banded rustication, and a coped gable with plain kneelers and a finial. It has a shallow segmental-arched entrance and an impost band. The windows are sashes with raised blocks in the jambs. | II |
| The Bungalow; 53.22481°N 1.62852°W | | c. 1830–40 | A cottage in sandstone that has a stone slate roof with timber bargeboards and moulded finials. There is a single storey and two gabled bays, the angles cut away and carried on stone piers. On the left is a porch, and the windows are cross windows. | II |
| The Cottage, Hollybush Cottage and wall 53.22543°N 1.62711°W | | c. 1830–40 | A pair of sandstone cottages with a floor band, a moulded eaves cornice, and a tile roof with decorative overhanging gables. There are two storeys and three bays, the left bay recessed, and a single-storey bay to the right. The doorway has a triangular head, and above it is a single-light window with stepped corbelling below and a stepped parapet above, and the flanking windows are mullioned. In the left bay is a canted oriel window on a moulded bracket, and with a hipped roof and a finial. On the east front is a bay window with buttresses and scrolled brackets above. The stone garden wall has a decorative wooden fence. | II |
| The Lodge; 53.22752°N 1.62627°W | | c. 1830–40 | The lodge is in sandstone with a floor band, and a hipped tile roof overhanging on brackets, and is in Italianate style. There are two storeys, an L-shaped plan, and a front of three bays. The left bay projects and contains a bay window, and all the windows have round-arched lights. In the angle is a porch with moulded imposts, and a doorway with massive jambs and lintel. | II |
| House north of The Yews; 53.22545°N 1.62519°W | — | c. 1830–40 | The house is in sandstone on a moulded plinth, with floor bands, bracketed eaves, a tile roof, and three bays. The left bay is broad with two storeys, it has a gable with a finial, and contains mullioned windows. The middle bay is narrow and recessed, and has two storeys, and a pointed shaped gable. It contains a staircase lancet window, and a rectangular window above. The right bay has a three-storey canted bay window and a hipped roof. To the north is a single-storey porch and sash windows. | II |
| Top House; 53.22455°N 1.63081°W | — | c. 1830–40 | A sandstone house in Italianate style, with bands, and a stone slate roof, hipped to the east, and overhanging on paired brackets. There are two storeys and a flat-roofed porch on the left, ending in a pier with a pyramidal cap. To the right are windows with three round-arched lights, and at the right end is a polygonal bay with square and round-arched windows. | II |
| Tudor Lodge; 53.22742°N 1.62670°W | | 1837 | A house designed by Jeffrey Wyatville, and completed by Joseph Paxton in 1839, it is in close studded timber framing with brick infill on a chamfered sandstone plinth, and has a stone slate roof with decorative fretted bargeboards and finials. There are two storeys and an irregular T-shaped plan, including a cross-wing with a jettied upper storey. The doorway has a quoined surround and a lintel, and the windows are casements, some with mullions, and some in half-dormers. | II* |
| Rock Villa; 53.22522°N 1.62857°W | | 1839 | A sandstone house with a floor band, and an overhanging tile roof on paired timber brackets. There are two storeys and three bays, the middle bay projecting with a moulded cornice and a gable with decorative bargeboards. In the ground floor is a round-arched casement window with a fanlight, flanked by blind lancet windows, above which is a tripartite window. In the left return is a round-arched doorway with a fanlight. The left bay contains a round-arched window in the upper floor and a window with a flat head in the upper floor, and on the left return is a canted bay window with an embattled parapet. | II |
| Edensor House; 53.22636°N 1.62731°W | — | c. 1840 | A sandstone house with quoins, a floor band, a hipped Welsh slate roof with bracketed eaves, and two storeys. The entrance front has a full-height canted bay window, a square rusticated porch with a cornice and blocking course, and a doorway with a rectangular fanlight. The garden front has three bays, and contains a canted bay window and sash windows, most with hood moulds. To the south is a service wing. | II |
| Norman Villa and walls 53.22564°N 1.62722°W | | c. 1840 | A house in sandstone with moulded floor and eaves bands in the form of arched corbel tables with roundels, and a tile roof with moulded gable copings, plain kneelers, stepped corbels, and square finials. There are two storeys, and the southwest front contains a canted bay window with a corbel table, and above it is a round-arched window and a gable. To the right is a flat-roofed porch with two moulded round arches and a circular column with a scalloped capital. In the northeast angle is a square tower, with blind panels in the lower stage, arcades in the top stage, and a pyramidal roof. Enclosing the rear courtyard is a tall wall containing pilaster buttresses with pyramidal caps. | II* |
| Ornamental Fountain, wall and railings 53.22594°N 1.62512°W | | 1840 | The fountain is in Norman style. In the centre is a projecting block with pseudo-machicolation and a moulded parapet. It contains a round arch within which is a spout in the form of a wild man in relief, and in front is a moulded semicircular basin. In the wall to the right is a corbelled-out square turret with a pyramidal cap, and to the left is a square tower-like bay with two blind arched windows. Above the central block is a square tower with a pyramidal cap. There are flanking walls, and those to the north have railings and angle piers with pyramidal caps. | II |
| The Gate House and railings 53.22653°N 1.62535°W | | 1842 | A lodge in sandstone with an embattled parapet, an octagonal tower, and angle turrets. There are one and two storeys, and an irregular plan with a front of three bays. Steps lead up to a doorway in the tower that has a chamfered surround and a hood mould, and in the tower are casement windows, blind windows, and arrow slits. Elsewhere, there are more casement windows, some with hood moulds, a window with a pointed arch, and a Tudor arched window with Y-tracery. In front of the building is a low coped wall with iron railings. | II* |
| Wall and railings, Edensor Village; 53.22628°N 1.62474°W | | c. 1842 | The wall and railings extend from the entrance to the village, enclosing its north end. The wall is low and in sandstone with chamfered copings, and the railings are in wrought iron with spear heads. Flanking the entrance to the village are square panelled and rusticated piers with moulded capitals and pyramidal caps. | II |
| Dunsa House; 53.22866°N 1.63050°W | | c. 1848 | The house, designed by Joseph Paxton in Italianate style, is in sandstone with hipped and gabled roofs in Welsh slate. There are two storeys, a three-storey tower, and a west front of four irregular bays. The tower has banded pilasters, in the ground floor is a rectangular window with an architrave and a segmental pediment, the middle floor has a round-arched window, and in the top floor are three arched lights, over which is a moulded cornice and parapet. | II |
| Water trough 53.21302°N 1.61316°W | — | Mid 19th century | The water trough is on the west side of the B6012 road, and is in sandstone. There is a long retaining wall with rounded copings, and it forms a recess in the centre. This contains a canted trough with moulding, and a spout for the fountain. | II |
| Russian Cottage; 53.21506°N 1.62799°W | | 1855 | A copy of a model Russian cottage, it is in sandstone, and timber in the form of horizontal logs, and has a stone slate roof. There is a cruciform plan, with the north arm in stone and the others in timber. Three arms have gables with elaborately fretted bargeboards and pendants. The windows are paired casements with dentilled pediments and decorative aprons. In an angle is a lean-to porch with a balustrade. | II |
| The Yews; 53.22526°N 1.62525°W | — | c. 1860 | A row of three cottages in sandstone on a chamfered plinth, with hipped tile roofs, and in Gothic style. There are two storeys and an irregular front of six bays. The porch has a chamfered segment pointed-arched entrance. The windows are casements, and some are mullioned; those in the upper floor are in half-dormers, the outer ones with hipped roofs, and the middle ones with half-hipped roofs. | II |
| Chest tomb 53.22507°N 1.62626°W | | c. 1865 | The chest tomb in the churchyard of St Peter's Church is to the memory of Joseph Paxton and members of his family. It is in sandstone and limestone, and consists of a rectangular chest with angle pilasters and a moulded top. On the tomb is moulded decoration and inscriptions on shields. | II |
| 1 and 2 Teapot Row; 53.22771°N 1.62754°W | — | 1912 | A pair of cottages in sandstone with quoins, and broad sweeping stone slate roofs with coped gables and moulded kneelers. There are two storeys and eight bays, the outer bays projecting under a gable and with a single storey. The outer bays contain doorways with four-centred arched heads and hood moulds on brackets. The windows are mullioned and have hood moulds, and in front of the centre bays is a verandah. | II |
| 3 Teapot Row; 53.22787°N 1.62779°W | — | 1912 | A cottage in sandstone with quoins, and a stone slate roof with coped gables and moulded kneelers. There are two storeys and two bays, and a single-storey lean-to on the east side. The right bay is gabled and projecting, and contains mullioned windows with hood moulds. The roof of the left bay sweeps down to a single storey with a parapet, and contains a doorway with a four-centred arched head and a bracketed hood. | II |
| 4 Teapot Row; 53.22798°N 1.62798°W | — | 1912 | A cottage in sandstone with quoins, and a stone slate roof with coped gables and moulded kneelers. There are two storeys and two bays, and a single-storey lean-to on the east side. The right bay is gabled and projecting, and contains mullioned windows with hood moulds. The roof of the left bay sweeps down to a single storey with a parapet, and contains a doorway with a four-centred arched head and a bracketed hood. | II |
| Moor View, Edensor; 53.22476°N 1.63047°W | | c. 1912 | The house is in sandstone with a tile roof, and is in Arts and Crafts style. There are two storeys and five bays, the outer and centre bays gabled, and the centre bay projecting. In the fourth bay is a porch with a flat roof, and the windows are casements. In the centre gable is a slit vent, and the outer bays contain decorative stone lozenge panels. | II |
| Telephone kiosk 53.22566°N 1.62508°W | | 1935 | The K6 type telephone kiosk opposite the post office was designed by Giles Gilbert Scott. Constructed in cast iron with a square plan and a dome, it has three unperforated crowns in the top panels. | II |
