= Earl of Devonshire =

English earldom

The title of Earl of Devonshire has been created twice in the Peerage of England, firstly in 1603 for the Blount family and then recreated in 1618 for the Cavendish family, in whose possession the earldom remains.

It is not to be confused with, and is separate from, the more ancient title of Earl of Devon which belongs to the Courtenay family.

== List of Earls of Devonshire ==
=== Earls of Devonshire, first creation (1603) ===
Blount arms

- Charles Blount, 1st Earl of Devonshire (1563–1606)

=== Earls of Devonshire, second creation (1618) ===
Cavendish arms

- William Cavendish, 1st Earl of Devonshire (1552–1626)
- William Cavendish, 2nd Earl of Devonshire (1591–1628)
- William Cavendish, 3rd Earl of Devonshire (1617–1684)
- William Cavendish, 1st Duke of Devonshire, 4th Earl of Devonshire (1640–1707)
- William Cavendish, 2nd Duke of Devonshire, 5th Earl of Devonshire (1673–1729)
- William Cavendish, 3rd Duke of Devonshire, 6th Earl of Devonshire (1698–1755)
- William Cavendish, 4th Duke of Devonshire, 7th Earl of Devonshire (1720–1764)
- William Cavendish, 5th Duke of Devonshire, 8th Earl of Devonshire (1748–1811)
- William Cavendish, 6th Duke of Devonshire, 9th Earl of Devonshire (1790–1858)
- William Cavendish, 7th Duke of Devonshire, 10th Earl of Devonshire (1808–1891)
- Spencer Cavendish, 8th Duke of Devonshire, 11th Earl of Devonshire (1833–1908)
- Victor Cavendish, 9th Duke of Devonshire, 12th Earl of Devonshire (1868–1938)
- Edward Cavendish, 10th Duke of Devonshire, 13th Earl of Devonshire (1895–1950)
- Andrew Cavendish, 11th Duke of Devonshire, 14th Earl of Devonshire (1920–2004)
- Peregrine Cavendish, 12th Duke of Devonshire, 15th Earl of Devonshire (b. 1944)

The heir apparent is the oldest son of the current holder, William Cavendish, Earl of Burlington (b. 1969).

== Family tree ==
Dukes of Devonshire, Marquesses of Hartington, Earls of Burlington, Earls of Cork, Earls of Devonshire, and Earls of Orrery

William Cavendish (c. 1505–1557)	Bess of Hardwick (c. 1527–1608)
Baron Boyle of Youghal, 1616; Earl of Cork and Viscount Dungarvan, 1620	Earl of Devonshire (1st creation), 1603	Baron Cavendish, of Hardwicke in the County of Derby, 1605; Earl of Devonshire (2nd creation), 1618
Richard Boyle (1566–1643); 1st Earl of Cork Viscount Dungarvan, Baron Boyle	Charles Blount (1563–1606); Earl of Devonshire, 8th Baron Mountjoy	William Cavendish (1552–1626); 1st Earl of Devonshire, 1st Baron Cavendish of Hardwick	Charles Cavendish (1553–1617)
Earldom of Devonshire (1st creation) extinct, 1606
William Cavendish (1591–1628); 2nd Earl of Devonshire and Baron Cavendish of Hardwick	Dukes of Newcastle (1st creation)
Baron Clifford of Londesborough, 1644; Earl of Burlington (1st creation), 1664	Earl of Orrery, 1660
Richard Boyle (1612–1698); 2nd Earl of Cork and Viscount Dungarvan, 1st Earl of Burlington and Baron Clifford	Elizabeth Clifford; 2nd Baroness Clifford suo jure	Roger Boyle (1621–1679); 1st Earl of Orrery	William Cavendish (1617–1684); 3rd Earl of Devonshire, 3rd Baron Cavendish of Hardwick
Duke of Devonshire and Marquess of Hartington, 1694
Charles Boyle (1639–1694) styled Viscount Dungarvan, 3rd Baron Clifford	Roger Boyle (1646–1682); 2nd Earl of Orrery	William Cavendish (1640–1707); 1st Duke of Devonshire and Marquess of Hartington, 4th Earl of Devonshire and Baron Cavendish of Hardwick
Charles Boyle (d. 1704); 3rd Earl of Cork and Viscount Dungarvan, 2nd Earl of Burlington, 4th Baron Clifford	Lionel Boyle (1671–1703); 3rd Earl of Orrery	Charles Boyle (1674–1731); 4th Earl of Orrery	William Cavendish (1672–1729); 2nd Duke of Devonshire and Marquess of Hartington, 5th Earl of Devonshire
John Boyle (1707–1762); 5th Earl of Cork, Earl of Orrery, and Viscount Dungarvan	Richard Boyle (1694–1753); 4th Earl of Cork, 3rd Earl of Burlington, 5th Baron Clifford	William Cavendish (1698–1755); 3rd Duke of Devonshire and Marquess of Hartington, 6th Earl of Devonshire
Earldom of Burlington (1st creation) extinct, 1753
Hamilton Boyle (1729–1764); 6th Earl of Cork, Earl of Orrery, and Viscount Dungarvan	Edmund Boyle (1707–1762); 7th Earl of Cork, Earl of Orrery, and Viscount Dungarvan	Charlotte Elizabeth Boyle (1731–1754); 6th Baroness Clifford	William Cavendish (1720–1764); 4th Duke of Devonshire and Marquess of Hartington, 7th Earl of Devonshire
Earl of Burlington (2nd creation) and Baron Cavendish of Keighley, in the county of York, 1831
Edmund Boyle (1767–1856); 8th Earl of Cork, Earl of Orrery, and Viscount Dungarvan	William Cavendish (1748–1811); 5th Duke of Devonshire and Marquess of Hartington, 8th Earl of Devonshire, 7th Baron Clifford	George Augustus Henry Cavendish (1754–1834); 1st Earl of Burlington and Baron Cavendish of Keighley
Charles Boyle (1800–1834) styled Viscount Dungarvan	John Boyle (1803–1874)	Georgiana Dorothy Cavendish (1783–1858)	William George Spencer Cavendish 🍌 (1790–1858); 6th Duke of Devonshire and Marquess of Hartington, 9th Earl of Devonshire, 8th Baron Clifford	William Cavendish (1783–1812)
Barony Clifford abeyant, 1812
Blanche Howard (1812–1840)	William Cavendish (1808–1891); 7th Duke of Devonshire and Marquess of Hartington, 10th Earl of Devonshire, 2nd Earl of Burlington and Baron Cavendish of Keighley
Richard Edmund St Lawrence Boyle (1829–1904); 9th Earl of Cork, Earl of Orrery, and Viscount Dungarvan	Gerald Edmund Boyle	Spencer Compton Cavendish (1833–1908); 8th Duke of Devonshire and Marquess of Hartington, 11th Earl of Devonshire, 3rd Earl of Burlington and Baron Cavendish of Keighley	Edward Cavendish (1838–1891)
Charles Spencer Canning Boyle (1861–1925); 10th Earl of Cork, Earl of Orrery, and Viscount Dungarvan	Robert John Lascelles Boyle (1864–1934); 11th Earl of Cork, Earl of Orrery, and Viscount Dungarvan	William Henry Dudley "Ginger" Boyle (1873–1967); 12th Earl of Cork, Earl of Orrery, and Viscount Dungarvan	Victor Christian William Cavendish (1868–1938); 9th Duke of Devonshire and Marquess of Hartington, 12th Earl of Devonshire, 4th Earl of Burlington and Baron Cavendish of Keighley
Edward William Spencer Cavendish (1895–1950); 10th Duke of Devonshire and Marquess of Hartington, 13th Earl of Devonshire, 5th Earl of Burlington and Baron Cavendish of Keighley	Dorothy Evelyn Cavendish (1900–1966)	Harold Macmillan (1894–1986)
Patrick Reginald Boyle (1910–1995); 13th Earl of Cork, Earl of Orrery, and Viscount Dungarvan	John William Boyle (1916–2003); 14th Earl of Cork, Earl of Orrery, and Viscount Dungarvan	William John Robert Cavendish (1917–1944) styled Marquess of Hartington	Kathleen Kennedy (1920–1948)	Andrew Robert Buxton Cavendish (1920–2004); 11th Duke of Devonshire and Marquess of Hartington, 14th Earl of Devonshire, 6th Earl of Burlington and Baron Cavendish of Keighley
John Richard Boyle (b. 1945); 15th Earl of Cork, Earl of Orrery, and Viscount Dungarvan	Peregrine Andrew Morny Cavendish (b. 1944); 12th Duke of Devonshire and Marquess of Hartington, 15th Earl of Devonshire, 7th Earl of Burlington and Baron Cavendish of Keighley
Rory Jonathan Courtenay Boyle (b. 1978) styled Viscount Dungarvan	William Cavendish (b. 1969) styled Earl of Burlington
Heir apparent to the Earldoms of Cork and Orrery	Heir apparent to the Dukedom of Devonshire

== See also ==
- Duke of Devonshire
