= Duke of Devonshire =

Title in the Peerage of England

Dukedom of Devonshire
- Sable three bucks' heads cabossed argent
- Creation date: 12 May 1694
- Created by: William III and Mary II
- Peerage: Peerage of England
- First holder: William Cavendish, 4th Earl of Devonshire
- Present holder: Peregrine Cavendish, 12th Duke
- Heir apparent: William Cavendish, Earl of Burlington
- Remainder to: the 1st Duke's heirs male of the body lawfully begotten
- Subsidiary titles: Marquess of Hartington; Earl of Devonshire; Earl of Burlington (from 1858); Baron Clifford (1764–1858); Baron Cavendish; Baron Cavendish of Keighley (from 1858)
- Seats: Chatsworth House; Bolton Abbey; Lismore Castle
- Former seats: Londesborough Hall; Hardwick Hall; Chiswick House; Devonshire House; Burlington House
- Motto: Cavendo Tutus ("Safe through Caution")

Duke of Devonshire is a title in the Peerage of England, held by the senior branch of the Cavendish family. It was created by William III in 1694 for the 4th Earl of Devonshire in recognition of his support during the Glorious Revolution. Many of the holders of the title have been prominent in British political life over the last three centuries, particularly the 4th Duke, who served briefly as Prime Minister during the Seven Years’ War.

== History ==
Although the Cavendish family estates are centred in Derbyshire, they hold the titles of "Duke of Devonshire" and their subsidiary title of earldom of Devonshire (neither peerage is related to the ancient title of Earl of Devon). The first Earl may have chosen "Devonshire" simply because places and lands he was associated with were already attached to existing peerages. The title remains associated with "Devonshire" even though in modern usage it is the county of Devon. Another reason for the choice of a non-local or regional name was to avoid antagonising the powerful Stanley family from the Midlands who had strong associations with Derbyshire since their ancestors had been gifted estates in the county by William the Conqueror, and they had also been the Earls of Derby since the late 15th century. (See British peerage ranks.)

Every Duke of Devonshire has so far been appointed a Knight Companion of the Order of the Garter, except (as of 2023) the present one.

=== Cavendish knights, and the 1st Earl of Devonshire ===
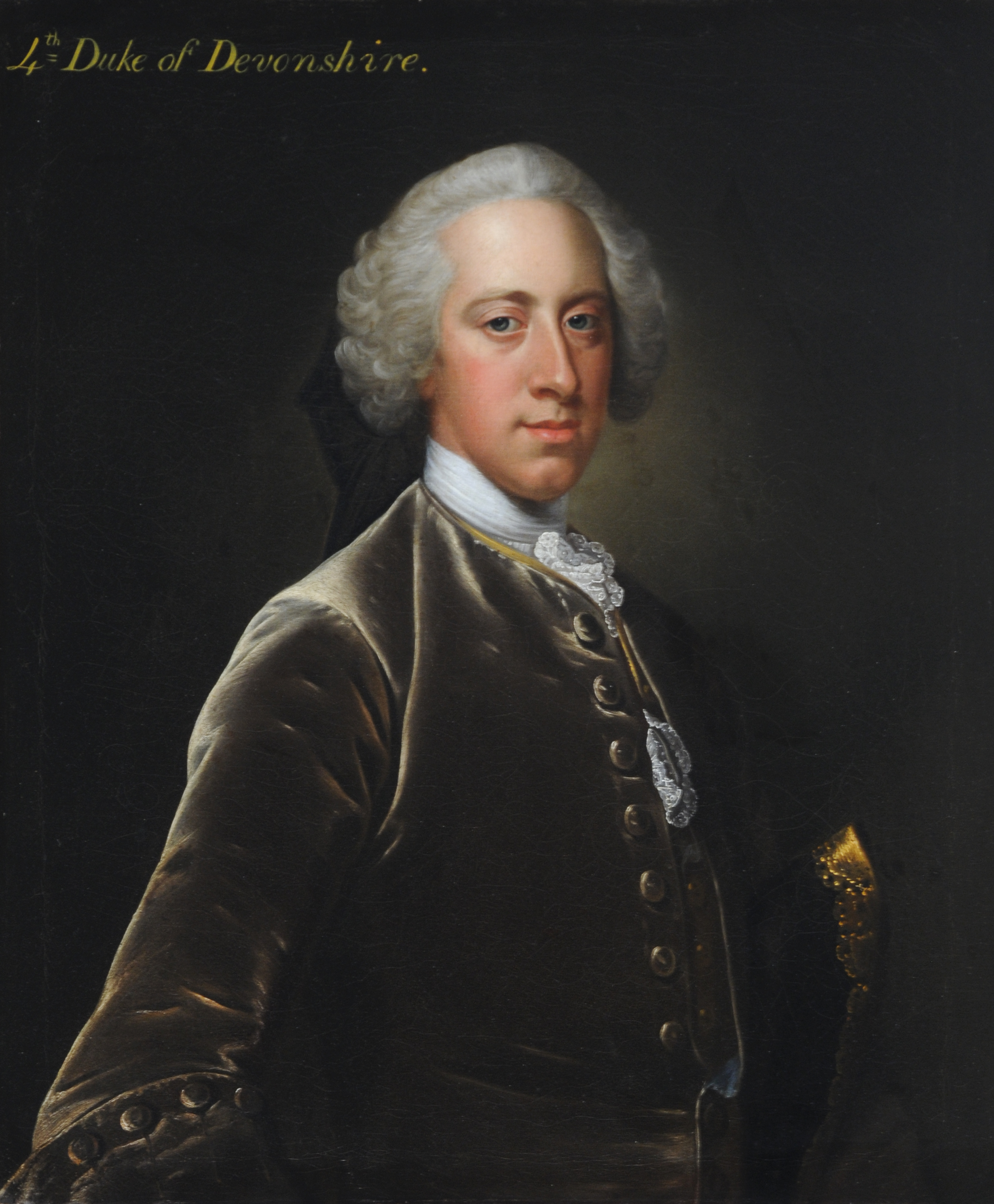
William Cavendish, 4th Duke of Devonshire briefly Prime Minister between 1756 and 1757.

The Cavendish family descends from Sir John Cavendish, who took his name from the village of Cavendish, Suffolk, where he held an estate in the 14th century. He served as Chief Justice of the King's Bench from 1372 to 1381, and was killed in the Peasants' Revolt in 1381. Two of his great-grandsons were George Cavendish, Cardinal Thomas Wolsey's biographer, and George's younger brother Sir William Cavendish. Sir William gained great wealth from his position in the Exchequer and also (allegedly) from unfairly taking advantage of the dissolution of the Monasteries. He married (1547) as his third wife the famous Bess of Hardwick, with whom he had eight children. One of their sons, Sir Charles Cavendish (1553–1617), was the father of William Cavendish, 1st Duke of Newcastle-upon-Tyne (1592–1676; see Duke of Newcastle-upon-Tyne for more information on this branch of the family), while another son, Henry Cavendish, was the ancestor of the Barons Waterpark. Yet another son, William Cavendish (1552–1626), was a politician and a supporter of the colonization of Virginia. In 1605 he was raised to the peerage as Baron Cavendish, of Hardwicke in the County of Derby, and in 1618 he was further honoured when he was made Earl of Devonshire. Both titles are in the Peerage of England.

=== The 2nd Earl of Devonshire and the first five Dukes of Devonshire ===
He was succeeded by his eldest son, William Cavendish, 2nd Earl of Devonshire, who served as Lord-Lieutenant of Derbyshire and was a patron of the philosopher Thomas Hobbes (1588–1679). On his early death in 1628 the titles passed to his son, William Cavendish, 3rd Earl of Devonshire, who also served as Lord-Lieutenant of Derbyshire. He was succeeded by his son, the fourth Earl. He was a strong supporter of the Glorious Revolution of 1688 and later served under William III and Mary II as Lord Steward of the Household. In 1694 he was created Marquess of Hartington and Duke of Devonshire in the Peerage of England. He was succeeded by his eldest son, the second Duke, who held political office as Lord President of the Council and Lord Privy Seal and was also Lord-Lieutenant of Devonshire. His eldest son, the third Duke, served as Lord Privy Seal, as Lord Steward of the Household and (from 1737 to 1745) as Lord-Lieutenant of Ireland.

On his death the titles passed to his eldest son, the fourth Duke, who was a prominent politician. He was summoned to the House of Lords through a writ of acceleration in his father's junior title of Baron Cavendish, of Hardwicke in 1751 and served as First Lord of the Treasury and titular Prime Minister of Great Britain from 1756 to 1757. Devonshire married Charlotte Boyle, 6th Baroness Clifford, daughter of the famous architect Richard Boyle, 3rd Earl of Burlington (on whose death in 1753 the earldom of Burlington became extinct). Their third and youngest son Lord George Cavendish was recreated Earl of Burlington in 1831. Devonshire was succeeded by his eldest son, William Cavendish, who became the fifth Duke of Devonshire. He had already succeeded his mother as seventh Baron Clifford in 1754. He served as Lord-Lieutenant of Derbyshire from 1782 to 1811 but is best remembered for his first marriage (1774) to Lady Georgiana Spencer (1757–1806), the celebrated beauty and society hostess.

=== The sixth, seventh and eighth Dukes ===
Their only son, the sixth Duke, served as Lord Chamberlain of the Household from 1827 to 1828 and from 1830 to 1834. Known as the "Bachelor Duke", he never married and on his death in 1858 the barony of Clifford fell into abeyance between his sisters. He was succeeded in the other titles by his first cousin once removed, the second Earl of Burlington, who became the seventh Duke (see the Earl of Burlington for earlier history of this branch of the family). He was the son of William Cavendish, eldest son of the aforementioned first Earl of Burlington, youngest son of the fourth Duke. He was Lord-Lieutenant of Lancashire and Derbyshire and Chancellor of the University of London and of the University of Cambridge. He was succeeded by his second, but eldest surviving son, the eighth Duke. The eighth Duke was a noted statesman and the most famous member of the Cavendish family. Known under his courtesy title of Marquess of Hartington until 1891, he held political office for a period spanning 40 years, notably as Secretary of State for India and as Secretary of State for War, and three times declined to become Prime Minister. He married Louise, Dowager Duchess of Manchester, who became known as the "Double Duchess".

=== The ninth, tenth and eleventh Dukes ===
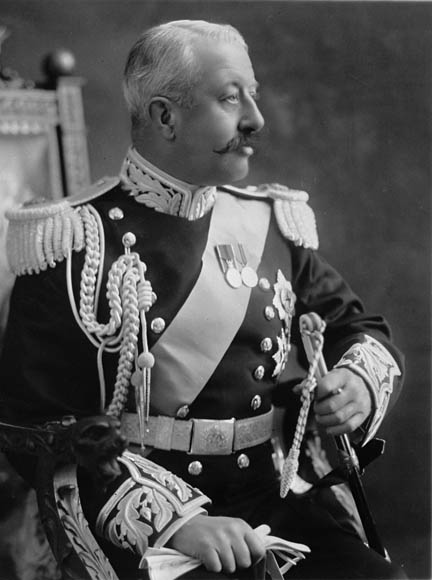
Victor Cavendish, 9th Duke of Devonshire, in uniform as Governor General of Canada (c.1916–1921)

Devonshire died childless and was succeeded by his nephew, the ninth Duke. He was the eldest son of Lord Edward Cavendish, third son of the seventh Duke. He was a Conservative politician and served as Governor General of Canada from 1918 to 1921 and as Secretary of State for the Colonies from 1922 to 1923.

His elder son, the tenth Duke, also a Conservative politician, served as Under-Secretary of State for Dominion Affairs, as Under-Secretary of State for India and Burma and as Under-Secretary of State for the Colonies. He married Lady Mary Gascoyne-Cecil, who was Mistress of the Robes to Queen Elizabeth II from 1953 to 1966. Their elder son and heir apparent William Cavendish, Marquess of Hartington, married Kathleen Kennedy, daughter of Joseph Kennedy and sister of the future President of the United States, John Fitzgerald Kennedy. Lord Hartington was killed in the Second World War in 1944 shortly after the marriage. The couple had no children.

Devonshire was therefore succeeded by his second and only surviving son, the eleventh Duke. He sat on the Conservative benches in the House of Lords and held political office (under his uncle Harold Macmillan and later under Alec Douglas-Home) from 1960 to 1964. Devonshire married the Hon. Deborah Mitford, the youngest of the famous Mitford sisters. As of 2022, the titles are held by their second and only surviving son, Peregrine Cavendish, 12th Duke of Devonshire, who succeeded in 2004.

The ninth and tenth dukes both served as Chancellor of the University of Leeds.

=== Other notable members of the Cavendish family ===
Numerous other members of the Cavendish family have also gained distinction. Lord Henry Cavendish (1673–1700), second son of the first Duke, was Member of Parliament for Derby. Lord James Cavendish (died 1751), third son of the first Duke, also represented this constituency in the House of Commons. Lord Charles Cavendish (1704–1783), second son of the second Duke, was a politician and scientist. His son Henry Cavendish (1731–1810) was an influential scientist noted for his discovery of hydrogen. Lord James Cavendish (1701–1741), third son of the second Duke, was a soldier and briefly represented Malton in Parliament. Lord George Cavendish (died 1794), second son of the third Duke, was a long-standing Member of Parliament and served as Comptroller of the Household from 1761 to 1762. Lord Frederick Cavendish, third son of the third Duke, was a Field Marshal in the Army. Lord John Cavendish, fourth son of the third Duke, was a politician and served as Chancellor of the Exchequer in 1782 and 1783.

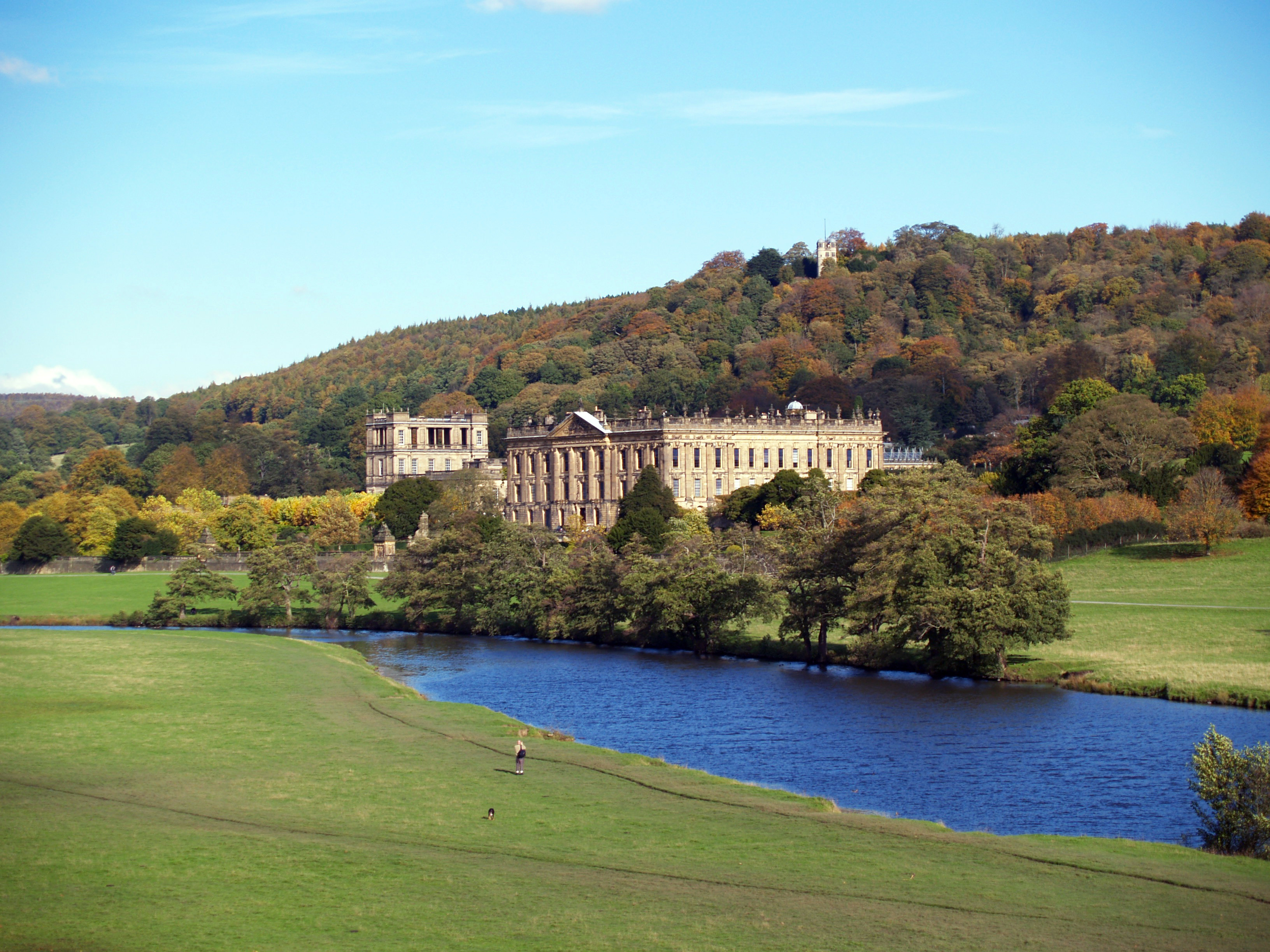
Chatsworth House, the ancestral seat of the Dukes of Devonshire

Lord Richard Cavendish, second son of the fourth Duke, represented Lancaster and Derbyshire in the House of Commons. Lady Dorothy Cavendish, daughter of the fourth Duke, married Prime Minister William Cavendish-Bentinck, 3rd Duke of Portland (who assumed the additional surname of Cavendish). Augustus Clifford, illegitimate son by the fifth Duke and his mistress and later second wife Elizabeth Hervey, was a naval commander and was created a baronet in 1838 (see Clifford baronets). William Cavendish, eldest son of the first Earl of Burlington and father of the seventh Duke, represented Aylesbury and Derby in Parliament. George Henry Compton Cavendish, second son of the first Earl of Burlington, was Member of Parliament for Aylesbury. The Hon. Henry Frederick Compton Cavendish, third son of the first Earl of Burlington, was a general in the Army. The Hon. Charles Compton Cavendish, fourth son of the first Earl of Burlington, was created Baron Chesham in 1858.

Lord Frederick Cavendish, third son of the seventh Duke, was a Liberal politician. He had just been appointed Chief Secretary for Ireland in 1882 when he was assassinated by nationalists in Phoenix Park, Dublin. His wife Lady Frederick (Lucy) Cavendish was a pioneer of women's education. Lord Edward Cavendish, fourth and youngest son of the seventh Duke, sat as Member of Parliament for several constituencies. His second son Lord Richard Cavendish represented North Lonsdale in Parliament. In 1911 he was one of the proposed recipients of peerages in case the Bill that was to become the Parliament Act 1911 was not accepted by the House of Lords. His grandson Hugh Cavendish was created a life peer as Baron Cavendish of Furness in 1990. Lady Dorothy Cavendish, daughter of the ninth Duke, was the wife of Prime Minister Harold Macmillan.

=== Courtesy titles ===
The Duke of Devonshire's eldest son may use the courtesy title Marquess of Hartington, whilst the eldest son of the eldest son may use the title Earl of Burlington, and his eldest son may use the title Lord Cavendish.

== Residences and estates ==
=== Country seats ===
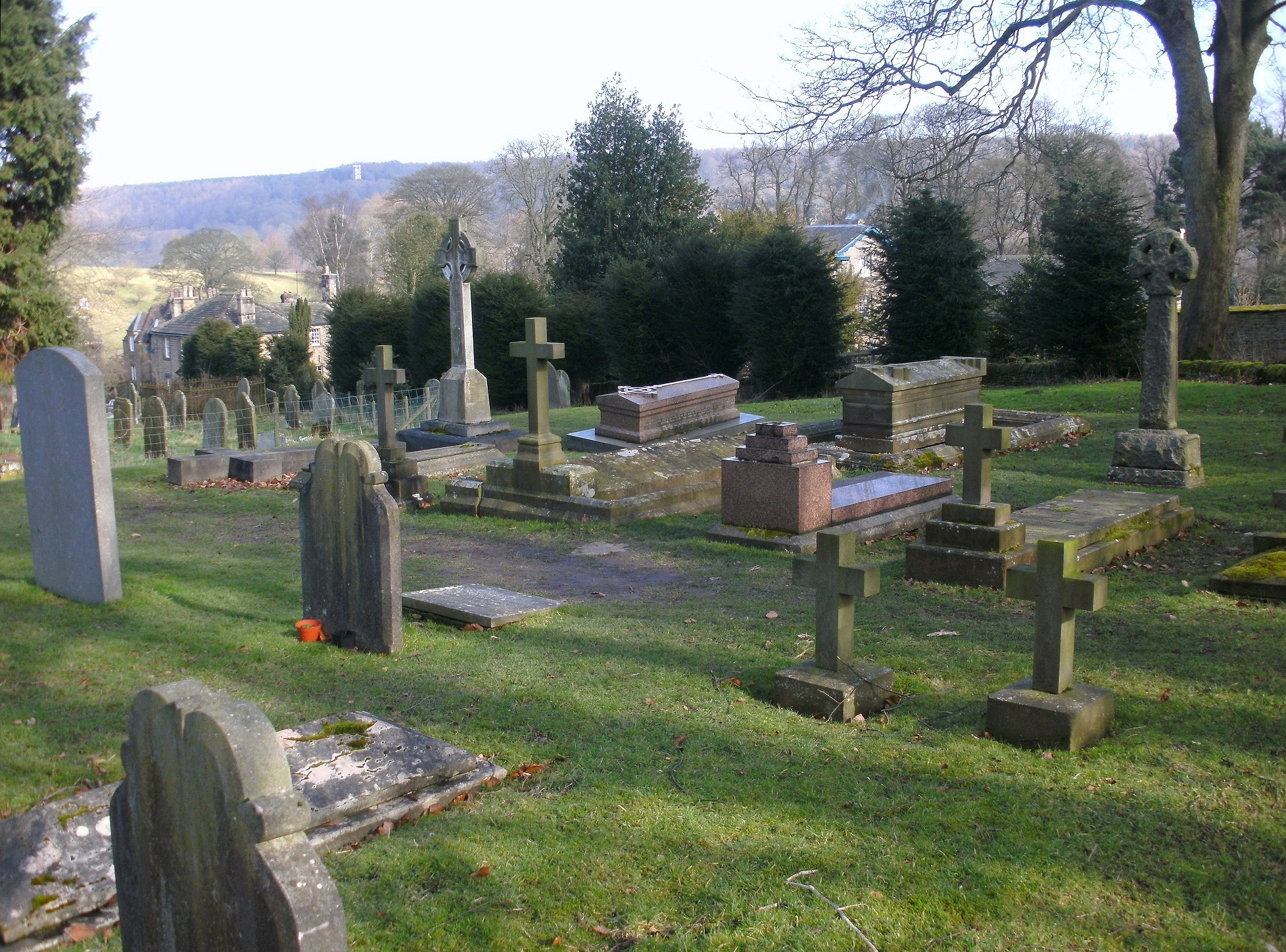
St Peter's Church, Edensor, Cavendish family plot with the graves of the Dukes of Devonshire

The family seats are Chatsworth House in Derbyshire, Bolton Abbey in North Yorkshire, and Lismore Castle in County Waterford, in the Republic of Ireland. Compton Place in Eastbourne belongs to the family (which developed Eastbourne as a seaside resort in the 19th century) but is let. In 1908 Holker Hall, then in Lancashire, now in Cumbria, was left to a junior branch of the family. The family previously owned Londesborough Hall, Yorkshire; Hardwick Hall, Derbyshire; Chiswick House, Middlesex.

The traditional burial place of the Dukes of Devonshire is at St Peter's Church, Edensor, in the closest village to Chatsworth House. The ducal graves can be found on the highest spot of Edensor's churchyard in the Cavendish family plot.

=== Estates ===
In the 1883 edition of John Bateman's The Great Landowners of Great Britain and Ireland, William Cavendish, 7th Duke of Devonshire's estates were recorded as spanning 198,572 acres across England and Ireland, including 89,462 acres in Derbyshire (a portion of which was owned by the Duke's son Lord Hartington), 32,550 acres in County Cork, 27,483 acres in County Waterford, 19,239 acres in the West Riding of Yorkshire, 12,681 acres in Lancashire, 11,062 acres in Sussex, 3,014 acres in Somerset, 1,392 acres in Lincolnshire, 983 acres in Cumberland, 524 acres in Middlesex, 125 acres in Nottinghamshire, 28 acres in Cheshire, 26 acres in Staffordshire, and 3 acres in County Tipperary, which produced a combined annual income of £180,750.

In 1907 Spencer Cavendish, 8th Duke of Devonshire was recorded as being the owner of approximlately 192,000 acres across the British Isles, principally in Derbyshire, Yorkshire, County Cork and County Waterford.

=== London residences ===
==== Devonshire House, Boswell Street ====
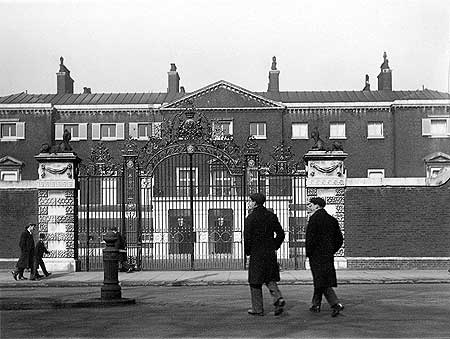
Devonshire House, Piccadilly in 1907

Old Devonshire House on Boswell Street was built for William, Lord Cavendish in 1668.

==== Devonshire House, Piccadilly ====
In 1694 William was created 1st Duke of Devonshire; he later purchased Berkeley House from John Berkeley, 3rd Baron Berkeley of Stratton in 1696, after which the house was renamed Devonshire House. The house was destroyed in a fire in 1733, and in its place William Cavendish, 3rd Duke of Devonshire oversaw the construction of a palatial new Devonshire House, which was the family's London seat throughout the 18th, 19th and early 20th centuries.

Victor Cavendish, 9th Duke of Devonshire sold Devonshire House in 1920 for £750,000 to the industrialists Shurmer Sibthorpe and Lawrence Harrison, who subsequently demolished the house to make way for hotel and block of flats.

==== Burlington House ====
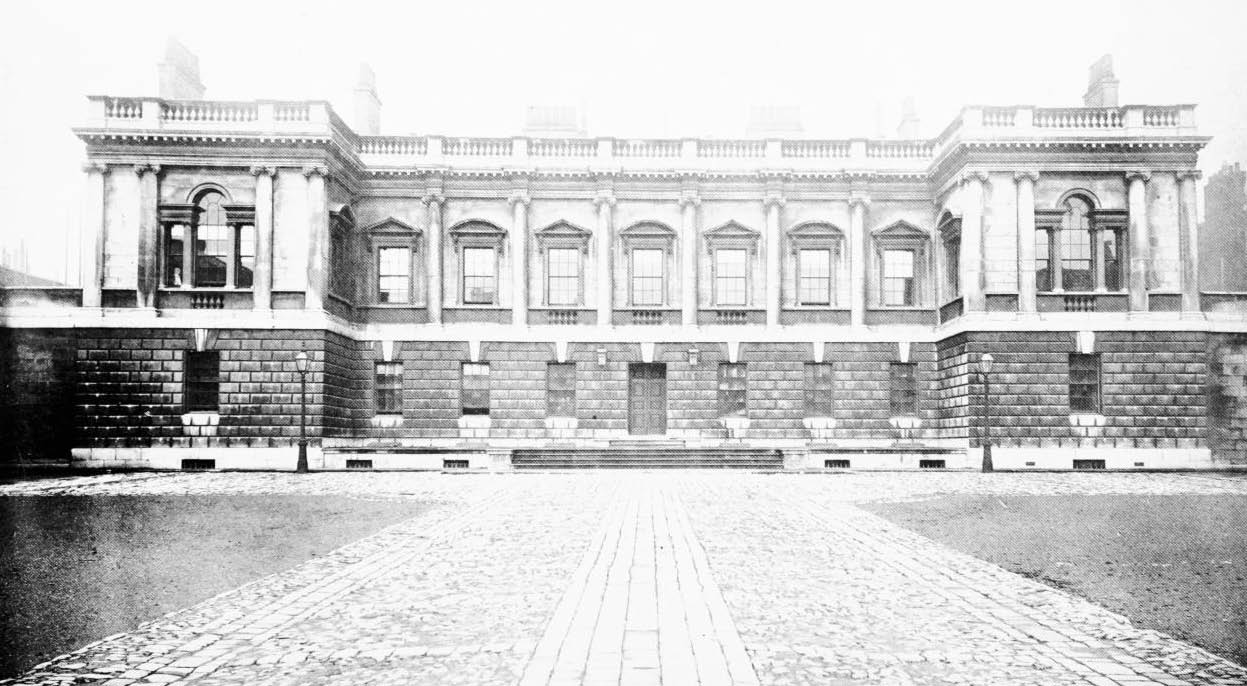
Burlington House in the mid-19th century

Following the death of Richard Boyle, 3rd Earl of Burlington in 1753, his London residence Burlington House passed to his only surviving child, Charlotte Cavendish, Marchioness of Hartington, wife of the future William Cavendish, 4th Duke of Devonshire. Lady Hartington died in the following year, and Burlington House passed into the ownership of her oldest son William, Lord Cavendish, who later succeeded as 5th Duke of Devonshire in 1764. As Devonshire House was already the Duke's primary residence in London, Burlington House was leased to the 5th Duke's brother-in-law William Cavendish-Bentinck, 3rd Duke of Portland and later the Duke's younger brother Lord George Cavendish. The 5th Duke died in 1811, and Burlington House passed to his only son William Cavendish, 6th Duke of Devonshire, who sold the property to his uncle Lord George Cavendish for £70,000 in 1815. Lord George was created Earl of Burlington in 1831, and his grandson William Cavendish later became the 2nd Earl of Burlington and 7th Duke of Devonshire. After Lord Burlington's death in 1834, Burlington House passed to his fourth son The Hon. Charles Cavendish (later 1st Baron Chesham) who sold Burlington House to the British Government for £140,000 in 1854.

==== 20th century ====
Following the sale of Devonshire House in 1919 the family's London residence was No. 2 Carlton Gardens from the early 1920s until it was badly damaged during the Second World War. During the final months of his life Edward Cavendish, 10th Duke of Devonshire purchased a new London residence at No. 19 Hill Street, Mayfair in 1950. This house was subsequently sold by his son Andrew Cavendish, 11th Duke of Devonshire in 1952 due to the substantial death duties levied on the estate after the 10th Duke's death.

In January 1952 the 11th Duke purchased a smaller house at No. 4 Chesterfield Street, Mayfair from Foreign Secretary Anthony Eden, which continued to be the Duke's London home for the remainder of his life. Following his death in May 2004, the house was reportedly offered for sale in July 2004 with an asking price of £1.75 million.

== Earls of Devonshire (1618) ==
Other titles: Baron Cavendish of Hardwick, in the county of Derby (1605)

- William Cavendish, 1st Earl of Devonshire (1552–1626) was an English courtier
- William Cavendish, 2nd Earl of Devonshire (1591–1628), eldest son of the 1st Earl
- William Cavendish, 3rd Earl of Devonshire (1617–1684), elder son of the 2nd Earl
- William Cavendish, 4th Earl of Devonshire (1640–1707) was created Duke of Devonshire in 1694

== Dukes of Devonshire (1694) ==
Other titles: Marquess of Hartington, in the county of Derby (1694), Earl of Devonshire (1618) and Baron Cavendish of Hardwick, in the county of Derby (1605)

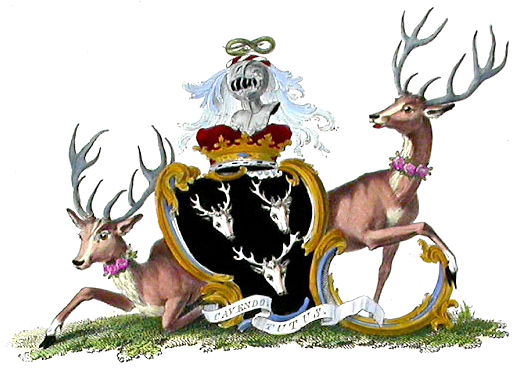
Armorial Achievement of the Dukes of Devonshire. Arms: Sable, 3 stags' (or bucks') heads caboshed (or cabossed). Crest: A serpent nowed proper (or vert). Supporters: On either side, a buck (or stag) wreathed (or gorged) about the neck with a chaplet (or garland) of roses proper—but see note! Motto: Cavendo tutus, Safe through caution. NOTE: The stags' head are sometimes given as attired Or; for example, . The garlands should be roses alternately argent and azure (see the preceding, , and the next). At least the 6th duke substituted as a crest a buck statant wreathed as the supporters (see the 1836 Debrett's Peerage of England, Scotland, and Ireland, viewable via Google Books).

- William Cavendish, 1st Duke of Devonshire (1640–1707), only son of the 3rd Earl
- William Cavendish, 2nd Duke of Devonshire (1673–1729), eldest son of the 1st Duke
- William Cavendish, 3rd Duke of Devonshire (1698–1755), eldest son of the 2nd Duke
- William Cavendish, 4th Duke of Devonshire (1720–1764), eldest son of the 3rd Duke

Other titles (5th & 6th Dukes): Baron Clifford (1628)

- William Cavendish, 5th Duke of Devonshire (1748–1811), eldest son of the 4th Duke
- William George Spencer Cavendish, 6th Duke of Devonshire (1790–1858), only son of the 5th Duke, was called "The Bachelor Duke" and died unmarried

Other titles (7th Duke onwards): Earl of Burlington and Baron Cavendish of Keighley, in the county of York (1831)

- William Cavendish, 7th Duke of Devonshire (1808–1891), eldest son of William Cavendish (1783–1812), eldest son of The 1st Earl of Burlington (by the second creation; 1754–1834), third son of the 4th Duke
- Spencer Compton Cavendish, 8th Duke of Devonshire (1833–1908), second son of the 7th Duke, died without issue
- Victor Christian William Cavendish, 9th Duke of Devonshire (1868–1938), eldest son of Lt.-Col. Lord Edward Cavendish (1838–1891), fourth son of the 7th Duke
- Edward William Spencer Cavendish, 10th Duke of Devonshire (1895–1950), eldest son of the 9th Duke
  - William John Robert Cavendish, Marquess of Hartington (1917–1944), elder son of the 10th Duke, was killed in action in World War II, without issue
- Andrew Robert Buxton Cavendish, 11th Duke of Devonshire (1920–2004), second and younger son of the 10th Duke
  - Mark Cavendish (born 1941), eldest son of the 11th Duke, died in infancy
- Peregrine Andrew Morny "Stoker" Cavendish, 12th Duke of Devonshire (born 1944), second son of the 11th Duke

The heir apparent is the present holder's only son, William "Bill Burlington" Cavendish, Earl of Burlington (born 1969), married to Laura Montagu (née Roundell). Lord Burlington, although entitled to use the courtesy title Marquess of Hartington, has continued to be styled by the Burlington title since his father succeeded as 12th Duke. The heir-in-line is Lord Burlington's second child and only son, James, Lord Cavendish (born 15 December 2010).

== Family tree ==
Boyle and Cavendish family tree including: Dukes of Devonshire, Marquesses of Hartington, Earls of Burlington, Earls of Cork, Earls of Devonshire, and Earls of Orrery

William Cavendish c. 1505–1557	Bess of Hardwick c. 1527–1608
Baron Boyle of Youghal, 1616; Earl of Cork and Viscount Dungarvan, 1620	Earl of Devonshire (1st creation), 1603	Baron Cavendish, of Hardwicke in the County of Derby, 1605; Earl of Devonshire (2nd creation), 1618
Richard Boyle; 1566–1643; 1st Earl of Cork, etc.	Charles Blount; 1563–1606; Earl of Devonshire, 8th Baron Mountjoy	William Cavendish; 1552–1626; 1st Earl of Devonshire, etc.	Charles Cavendish; 1553–1617
Earldom of Devonshire (1st creation) extinct, 1606
William Cavendish; 1591–1628; 2nd Earl of Devonshire, etc.	Dukes of Newcastle (1st creation)
Baron Clifford of Londesborough, 1644; Earl of Burlington (1st creation), 1664	Earl of Orrery, 1660
Richard Boyle; 1612–1698; 2nd Earl of Cork, etc., 1st Earl of Burlington, etc.	Elizabeth Clifford; 1613–1691; 2nd Baroness Clifford suo jure	Roger Boyle; 1621–1679; 1st Earl of Orrery	William Cavendish; 1617–1684; 3rd Earl of Devonshire, etc.
Duke of Devonshire and Marquess of Hartington, 1694
Charles Boyle; 1639–1694 styled Viscount Dungarvan, 3rd Baron Clifford	Roger Boyle; 1646–1682; 2nd Earl of Orrery	William Cavendish; 1640–1707; 1st Duke of Devonshire, etc., 4th Earl of Devonshire, etc.
Charles Boyle d. 1704; 3rd Earl of Cork, etc., 2nd Earl of Burlington, 4th Baron Clifford	Lionel Boyle; 1671–1703; 3rd Earl of Orrery	Charles Boyle; 1674–1731; 4th Earl of Orrery	William Cavendish; 1672–1729; 2nd Duke of Devonshire, etc., 5th Earl of Devonshire
John Boyle; 1707–1762; 5th Earl of Cork, etc.	Richard Boyle; 1694–1753; 4th Earl of Cork, 3rd Earl of Burlington, 5th Baron Clifford	William Cavendish; 1698–1755; 3rd Duke of Devonshire, etc., 6th Earl of Devonshire
Earldom of Burlington (1st creation) extinct, 1753
Hamilton Boyle; 1729–1764; 6th Earl of Cork, etc.	Edmund Boyle; 1707–1762; 7th Earl of Cork, etc.	Charlotte Elizabeth Boyle; 1731–1754; 6th Baroness Clifford	William Cavendish; 1720–1764; 4th Duke of Devonshire, etc., 7th Earl of Devonshire
Earl of Burlington (2nd creation) and Baron Cavendish of Keighley, in the county of York, 1831
Edmund Boyle; 1767–1856; 8th Earl of Cork, etc.	William Cavendish; 1748–1811; 5th Duke of Devonshire, etc., 8th Earl of Devonshire, 7th Baron Clifford	George Augustus Henry Cavendish; 1754–1834; 1st Earl of Burlington, Baron Cavendish of Keighley
Charles Boyle; 1800–1834 styled Viscount Dungarvan	John Boyle 1803–1874	Georgiana Dorothy Cavendish; 1783–1858	William George Spencer Cavendish 🍌 1790–1858; 6th Duke of Devonshire, etc., 9th Earl of Devonshire, 8th Baron Clifford	William Cavendish; 1783–1812
Barony Clifford abeyant, 1812
Blanche Howard; 1812–1840	William Cavendish; 1808–1891; 7th Duke of Devonshire, etc., 10th Earl of Devonshire, 2nd Earl of Burlington, Baron Cavendish of Keighley
Richard Edmund St Lawrence Boyle; 1829–1904; 9th Earl of Cork, etc.	Gerald Edmund Boyle	Spencer Compton Cavendish; 1833–1908; 8th Duke of Devonshire, etc., 11th Earl of Devonshire, 3rd Earl of Burlington, Baron Cavendish of Keighley	Edward Cavendish; 1838–1891
Charles Spencer Canning Boyle; 1861–1925; 10th Earl of Cork, etc.	Robert John Lascelles Boyle; 1864–1934; 11th Earl of Cork, etc.	William Henry Dudley "Ginger" Boyle; 1873–1967; 12th Earl of Cork, etc.	Victor Christian William Cavendish; 1868–1938; 9th Duke of Devonshire, etc., 12th Earl of Devonshire, 4th Earl of Burlington, Baron Cavendish of Keighley
Edward William Spencer Cavendish; 1895–1950; 10th Duke of Devonshire, etc., 13th Earl of Devonshire, 5th Earl of Burlington, Baron Cavendish of Keighley	Dorothy Evelyn Cavendish; 1900–1966	Harold Macmillan; 1894–1986
Patrick Reginald Boyle; 1910–1995; 13th Earl of Cork, etc.	John William Boyle; 1916–2003; 14th Earl of Cork, etc.	William John Robert Cavendish; 1917–1944 styled Marquess of Hartington	Kathleen Kennedy; 1920–1948	Andrew Robert Buxton Cavendish; 1920–2004; 11th Duke of Devonshire, etc., 14th Earl of Devonshire, 6th Earl of Burlington, Baron Cavendish of Keighley
John Richard Boyle b. 1945; 15th Earl of Cork, etc.	Peregrine Andrew Morny Cavendish b. 1944; 12th Duke of Devonshire, etc., 15th Earl of Devonshire, 7th Earl of Burlington, Baron Cavendish of Keighley
Rory Jonathan Courtenay Boyle b. 1978 styled Viscount Dungarvan	William Cavendish b. 1969 styled Earl of Burlington
Heir apparent to the Earldoms of Cork and Orrery	Heir apparent to the Dukedom of Devonshire

== Line of succession (simplified) ==
Line of succession (simplified)
- William Cavendish, 4th Duke of Devonshire (1720–1764)
  - William Cavendish, 5th Duke of Devonshire (1748–1811)
    - William Cavendish, 6th Duke of Devonshire (1790–1858)
  - George Cavendish, 1st Earl of Burlington (1754–1834)
    - William Cavendish (1783–1812)
      - William Cavendish, 7th Duke of Devonshire, 7th Marquess of Hartington, 2nd Earl of Burlington (1808–1891)
        - Spencer Cavendish, 8th Duke of Devonshire (1833–1908)
        - Lt-Col. Lord Edward Cavendish (1838–1891)
          - Victor Cavendish, 9th Duke of Devonshire (1868–1938)
            - Edward Cavendish, 10th Duke of Devonshire (1895–1950)
              - Andrew Cavendish, 11th Duke of Devonshire (1920–2004)
                - Peregrine Cavendish, 12th Duke of Devonshire (b. 1944)
                  - (1) William Cavendish, Earl of Burlington (b. 1969)
                    - (2) James, Lord Cavendish (b. 2010)
          - Lt.-Col Rt. Hon. Lord Richard Cavendish (1871–1946)
            - Richard Edward Osborne Cavendish (1917–1972)
              - (3) Hugh Cavendish, Baron Cavendish of Furness (b. 1941)
                - (4) Hon. Frederick Richard Toby Cavendish (b. 1972)
                  - (5) Henry Aurelian William Cavendish (b. 2014)
                  - (6) Alfred George Augustus Cavendish (b. 2021)
              - (7) Edward Osborne Cavendish (b. 1955)
    - General Hon. Henry Cavendish (1789–1873)
      - William Henry Frederick Cavendish (1817–1881)
        - Cecil Charles Cavendish (1855–1931)
          - Brigadier Ronald Valentine Cecil Cavendish (1896–1943)
            - Maj-Gen. Peter Boucher Cavendish (1925–2011)
              - male issue in line
            - Robin Francis Cavendish (1930–1994)
              - male issue in line
      - Francis William Henry Cavendish (1820–1893)
        - Reginald Richard Frederick Cavendish (1857–1941)
          - Godfrey Lionel John Cavendish (1884–1914)
            - Hubert Gordon Compton Cavendish (1913–1993)
              - male issue in line
        - Ernest Lionel Francis Cavendish (1863–1946)
          - Alwyn Lionel Compton Cavendish (1890–1928)
            - Charles Francis Alwyn Compton Cavendish (1919–2009)
              - male issue in line
      - George Henry Cavendish (1824–1889)
        - William Henry Alexander George Delmar Cavendish (1849–1919)
          - Charles Alfred William Delmar (1878–1939)
            - Richard Blake Delmar Cavendish (1916–1980)
              - male issue in line
          - William Henry George Cavendish (1886–1965)
            - Edwin Pearson Delmar Cavendish (1908–1970)
              - Adrian Delmar Cavendish (1947–2019)
                - male issue in line
            - William Delmar Cavendish (1911–1997)
              - male issue in line
    - Charles Cavendish, 1st Baron Chesham (1793–1863)
      - Barons Chesham

== Earls of Devonshire ==
The earldom of Devonshire was originally granted as a recreation of the title held by the last Baron Mountjoy, which became extinct on his death in 1606.

It is a separate title from that of Earl of Devon, which still belongs to the Courtenay family.

== In fiction ==
The fifth Duke and Duchess of Devonshire are portrayed in the 2008 film The Duchess directed by Saul Dibb. The film is based on Amanda Foreman's biography of the scandalous 18th-century English aristocrat Georgiana Cavendish, Duchess of Devonshire (portrayed by Keira Knightley) and her relationship with the Duke (Ralph Fiennes) and his next wife, Lady Elizabeth Foster.

Along with Jane Austen, the fifth Duke and his second wife appear, soon after Georgiana's death, in Jane and the Stillroom Maid, a murder mystery by Stephanie Barron.

In John Buchan's novel The Three Hostages (1924), 'the late Duke of Devonshire' is cited as an epitome of Englishness. This probably refers to the eighth duke.

In the episode 'The Man in the Killer Suit' in the 2014 TV series Forever, a case occurs where someone masquerades as a "Viscount Cavendish". While the title is wrongly used, other references during the episode show that they are in fact referring to the Dukes of Devonshire.

== See also ==
- Duchess of Devonshire
- Earl of Devonshire
- Duke of Newcastle-upon-Tyne (1665 creation)
- Earl of Burlington
- Baron Chesham
- Baron Clifford
- Baron Waterpark
- Thomas Cavendish known as "The Navigator"
- Chatsworth (TV series), documentary about Chatsworth House
