= John Lysaght (disambiguation) =

John Lysaght may refer to:

- John Lysaght, 1st Baron Lisle (1702–1781), Irish peer
- John Lysaght, 2nd Baron Lisle (1729–1798), Irish peer
- John Lysaght, 3rd Baron Lisle (1781–1834), Irish peer
- John Lysaght, 5th Baron Lisle (1811–1898), Irish peer
- John Lysaght, 7th Baron Lisle (1903–1997), Irish peer

== See also ==
- John Lysaght and Co.
- Lysaght (Australian company)
