= Charleville (Parliament of Ireland constituency) =

Pre-1801 Irish constituency

- Former borough constituency for the Irish House of Commons
- County: County Cork
- Borough: Charleville

1673–1801
- Seats: 2
- Replaced by: Disfranchised

Charleville was a constituency in County Cork represented in the Irish House of Commons until its abolition on 1 January 1801.

== History ==
The town of Charleville was named after Charles II. It was enfranchised in 1673, with a sovereign, 12 burgesses and freemen. It belonged to the Earl of Orrery, a branch of the Boyle family. In the Patriot Parliament of 1689 summoned by James II, Charleville was represented with two members. At the end of the 18th Century the constituency was controlled by the Earl of Shannon and the Earl of Cork who each nominated one member. The compensation of £15,000 for the loss of the seats in the Acts of Union 1800 was divided equally between them.

== Members of Parliament, 1673–1801 ==
=== 1689–1801 ===
Election	First MP	Second MP
1689	John Baggot	John Power
1692	Henry Boreman	George Crofts (Note: Expelled in October 1692)
1695	Hon. Charles Boyle	John Ormsby
1703	George Evans	Robert FitzGerald
1713	Sir Matthew Deane, 3rd Bt	Brettridge Badham
1715	George Evans	William Boyle
1721	Henry Purdon	William Boyle
1725	Henry Purdon	James O'Brien
1727	John Lysaght	Price Hartstonge
1744	John Lysaght	Edward Barry
1759	Viscount Dungarvon	Edward Barry
1761	Robert Barry	Richard Longfield
1768	Robert Barry	James Lysaght
1776	Richard Cox	Thomas Warren
October 1783	Rogerson Cotter	John Bennett (Note: Also elected for Castlemartyr in 1783, for which he chose to sit)
1783	Rogerson Cotter	Richard St George
1790	Rogerson Cotter	Sir John Blaquiere, 1st Bt
1798	Rogerson Cotter	Charles Boyle
1800	Rogerson Cotter	George Nugent
1801	Disenfranchised	

== Bibliography ==
- O'Hart, John (2007). The Irish and Anglo-Irish Landed Gentry: When Cromwell came to Ireland. Vol. II. Heritage Books. ISBN 0-7884-1927-7.
- Johnston-Liik, E. M. (2002). History of the Irish Parliament, 1692–1800., Publisher: Ulster Historical Foundation (28 Feb 2002), ISBN 1-903688-09-4,
- Tim Cadogan and Jeremiah Falvey, A Biographical Dictionary of Cork, 2006, Four Courts Press ISBN 1-84682-030-8,
- T. W. Moody, F. X. Martin, F. J. Byrne, A New History of Ireland 1534–1691, Oxford University Press, 1978
- Leigh Rayment's historical List of Members of the Irish House of Commons. Cites: Johnston-Liik, Edith Mary (2002). The History of the Irish Parliament 1692-1800 (6 volumes). Ulster Historical Foundation.
