= Edmund Boyle =

Edmund Boyle may refer to:

- Edmund Boyle, 7th Earl of Cork and 7th Earl of Orrery (1742–1798)
- Edmund Boyle, 8th Earl of Cork and 8th Earl of Orrery (1767–1856)
