= Robert Barry (politician) =

Irish politician and barrister

Robert Barry (1731–1793) was an Irish politician and barrister.

He was the third son of Sir Edward Barry, 1st Baronet. He was educated at Trinity College, Dublin. In 1750, he was admitted to Lincoln's Inn and in 1753, he graduated with a Bachelor of Arts. He was appointed a King's Counsel in 1768. Between 1761 and 1776, Barry sat in the Irish House of Commons for Charleville, the same constituency his father had also represented before.

In 1762, Barry married Elizabeth Lyons, daughter of Henry Lyons, a Member of Parliament for King's County. He married Elizabeth La Touche, daughter of James Digges La Touche in 1780.

Parliament of Ireland
| Preceded by Viscount Dungarvon; Edward Barry | Member of Parliament for Charleville; 1761–1776; With: Richard Longfield 1761–1768; James Lysaght 1768–1776 | Succeeded by Richard Cox; Thomas Warren |
