= Sir Edward Barry, 1st Baronet =

Irish physician and politician

Sir Edward Barry, 1st Baronet FRS (1696 – 29 March 1776) was an Irish physician and politician.

== Background and education ==
He was the son of Edward Barry and his wife Jane, and was educated at Trinity College Dublin. In 1717, Barry graduated with a Bachelor of Arts. Subsequently, he studied at the University of Leyden in the Netherlands and became a Doctor of Medicine in 1721. He received the same degree from Trinity College Dublin in 1740 and the University of Oxford in 1761.

== Career ==
Barry was elected a Fellow of the Royal Society in 1732. Additionally he was appointed a Fellow of the Royal College of Physicians of Ireland in 1740 and its president in 1749. Barry became Physician-General to the Army in Ireland in 1745. He taught as Regius Professor of Physic Dublin University between 1754 and 1761. A year later, Barry became a Fellow of the Royal College of Physicians of London and then a censor in 1763. He entered the Irish House of Commons in 1744, representing Charleville until 1760. On 1 August 1775, he was created a baronet, of the City of Dublin, in the Baronetage of Ireland.

== Family ==
On 18 December 1746, Barry married secondly Jane Dopping, daughter of Anthony Dopping, sometime the Bishop of Ossory. He had four sons by his first wife and also three sons and two daughters by his second wife. Barry died at Bath, Somerset and was succeeded in the baronetcy by his eldest son Nathaniel. His third son Robert was also a Member of Parliament for Charleville.

Parliament of Ireland
Preceded by John Lysaght; Price Hartstonge	Member of Parliament for Charleville; 1744–1760; With: John Lysaght 1744–1759; Viscount Dungarvon 1759–1760	Succeeded by Richard Cox; Thomas Warren
Baronetage of Ireland
New creation	Baronet (of Dublin); 1775–1776	Succeeded by Nathaniel Barry
