= Duchess of Devonshire =

Some women to have held the title Duchess of Devonshire, as wives of the Duke of Devonshire, include:

- Mary Cavendish, Duchess of Devonshire (1646–1710), wife of the first duke
- Rachel Cavendish, Duchess of Devonshire (1674 – 1725), wife of the second duke
- Catherine Cavendish, Duchess of Devonshire (1700–1777), wife of the third duke
- Georgiana Cavendish, Duchess of Devonshire (1757–1806), first wife of the fifth duke
- Elizabeth Cavendish, Duchess of Devonshire (1759–1824), second wife of the fifth duke
- Louisa Cavendish, Duchess of Devonshire (1832–1911), wife of the eighth duke
- Evelyn Cavendish, Duchess of Devonshire (1870–1960), wife of the ninth duke
- Mary Cavendish, Duchess of Devonshire (1895–1988), wife of the tenth duke
- Deborah Cavendish, Duchess of Devonshire (1920–2014), wife of the eleventh duke
- Amanda Cavendish, Duchess of Devonshire (born 1944), wife of the twelfth duke

== Other uses ==
- TSS Duchess of Devonshire, a ship
