= Chatsworth (TV series) =

2012 British TV documentary series

- Genre: Documentary
- Written by: Patrick Uden
- Directed by: Mark Henderson; Fiona Mellon-Grant; Faye Ryan
- Narrated by: Max Beesley
- Composer: Paul Farrer
- Country of origin: United Kingdom
- Original language: English
- No. of series: 1
- No. of episodes: 3

Production
- Executive producers: Alexander Gardiner; Andrew Nicholson
- Producers: Mark Henderson; Fiona Mellon-Grant; Faye Ryan
- Cinematography: Jonathan Chappell; Danny Rohrer; Chris Sugden Smith
- Running time: 60 minutes
- Production company: Shiver (ITV Studios) for BBC

Original release
- Network: BBC One
- Release: 14 May – 28 May 2012

Chatsworth is a three-part British television documentary series first aired on BBC One in 2012. It documents, over 2011, contemporary life at Chatsworth House in Derbyshire, England which, as the family seat of the Duke of Devonshire, employs 700 staff to look after the 300 rooms of the house, plus a 35,000-acre estate, embracing 62 farms and three villages.

== Episode one ==
The first programme joins the 12th duke and duchess as the house is being prepared to open to the public on Sunday 13 March 2011. It is the busiest time of year for the house staff and everyone has a role to play including the duke and duchess as they join the annual litter pick around the estate.

The youngest and very first female head guide, Heather Redmond is on probation and if she gets the job will be in charge of the sixty guides some of whom have worked at Chatsworth since before she was born.

Chatsworth's award-winning farm shop is presided over by manager Andre Birkett who has worked for the family, starting in the kitchens of the house. He is now responsible for 120 staff and an annual turnover of over five million pounds.

As winter turns to spring it is lambing season on the estate's 62 farms, and farm manager Ian Turner, who has 32 years service takes us on a tour of the farm, where he shows a sheep adopting a rejected lamb.

== Episode two ==
This episode concentrates on two of the 16 special events that provide an income to support the upkeep of the house. The duchess presides over the Chatsworth International Horse Trials, 75 fences over a 300-acre course, which in 2011 is an official qualifier for the London Olympics.

The 2011 season sees the third annual Chatsworth flower festival, Florabundance, and the problem of unseasonably warm spring weather making the tulips flower ahead of schedule and attacks by the estates pheasants, rabbits, and mice leaving floral designer Jonathan Moseley 5,000 blooms short just days ahead of the grand opening.

Another problem is the tablecloth in the grand dining room that had been over starched and was impossible to iron with the public only noticing the creases and not the magnificent table settings.

== Episode three ==
Summer and Chatsworth has been undergoing a £14 million pound renovation to clean the stonework and gild the window frames and finials with gold leaf. This has meant that for the last year scaffolding has covered the famous south facade, which is used as the background to the 40 or so weddings held at the old stables every year. The events manager arranges for wedding photos to be photoshopped to remove the scaffolding from clients photographs. A new wedding brochure themed on Pride and Prejudice is also being made using trainee catering manager Lewis Leybourne as Mr Bingley. Estate workers were once provided with accommodation in one of the three villages but nowadays the cottages are rented as holiday homes and the Duchess supervises one such change of use. The Duke is supervising the erection of a number of bronze busts of his family, royalty and other friends in the gardens. It is also the 48th Chatsworth Horticultural and Produce show when staff compete with each other for trophies. The episode ends with the removal of the scaffolding and the Duke, Duchess, and staff celebrating a record year.
