= John Lysaght, 2nd Baron Lisle =

Anglo-Irish aristocrat and Whig politician

John Lysaght, 2nd Baron Lisle of Mountnorth (1729 – 9 January 1798) was an Anglo-Irish aristocrat and a Whig politician in the Irish House of Commons.

He was born in 1729 in Dublin to John Lysaght, and Catherine, daughter of Joseph Deane, by Margaret Boyle, sister of the Earl of Shannon. The Lysaght family (pronounced Lycett) descended from the ancient Irish House of O'Bryen. His father was created Baron Lisle in the Peerage of Ireland in 1753.

Lysaght was educated at Trinity College Dublin.] He was selected to the Whig parliaments as MP for Castlemartyr in 1753. He was appointed High Sheriff for County Cork in 1757.

After the accession of George III in 1760 to the English and Irish thrones, Lysaght was elected as a 'knight of the shire' MP for County Cork for three years in 1765.

In 1778, Lysaght married Mary Anne Connor, the daughter of George Connor of Ballybracken in County Cork. The couple had two sons and two daughters:

- John Lysaght, 3rd Baron Lisle (1781–1834), married Sarah, eldest daughter of William Gibb of Inverness
- George Lysaght, 4th Baron Lisle (1783–1868), married first to Elizabeth, eldest daughter of Samuel Knight
- Elizabeth, married James Hall
- Catharine, married in 1803 to Thomas Delany Hall

Peerage of Ireland
Preceded by John Lysaght	Baron Lisle; 1781–1798	Succeeded by John Lysaght
