= Charles Boyle, 4th Earl of Orrery =

British army officer and politician

Major-General The Right Honourable The Earl of Orrery KT PC FRS
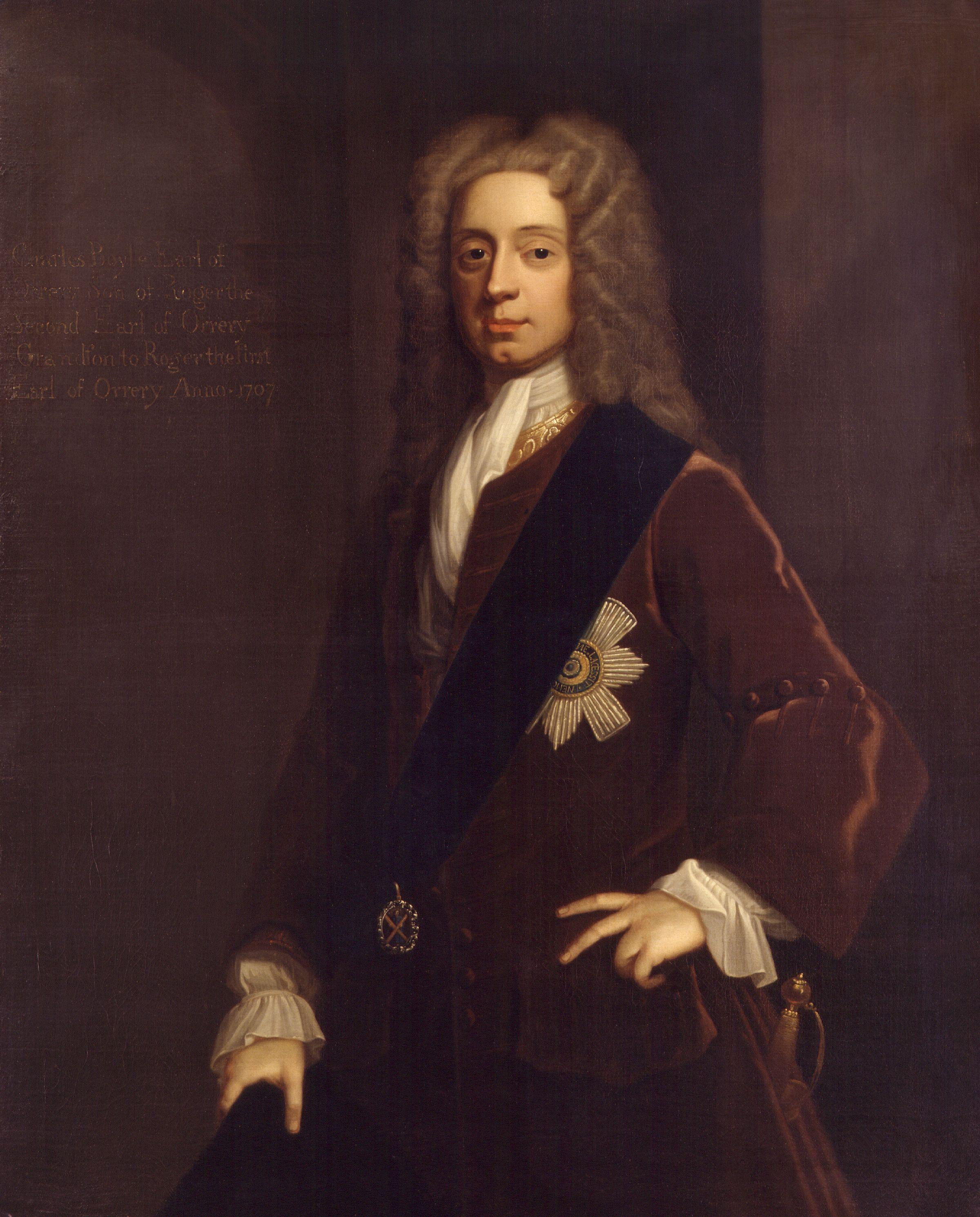
- Portrait by Charles Jervas, 1707
- Born: Charles Boyle; 28 July 1674; Little Chelsea, London
- Died: 28 August 1731 (aged 57) Westminster, London

Major-General Charles Boyle, 4th Earl of Orrery, KT, PC, FRS (28 July 1674 – 28 August 1731) was a British army officer and politician who represented Huntingdon in the House of Commons of England from 1701 to 1705.

== Early life ==
The second son of Roger Boyle, 2nd Earl of Orrery, and his wife Lady Mary Sackville (1647–1710), daughter of Richard Sackville, 5th Earl of Dorset, he was born at Little Chelsea, London. He was educated at Christ Church, Oxford, and soon distinguished himself by his learning and abilities.

== Career ==
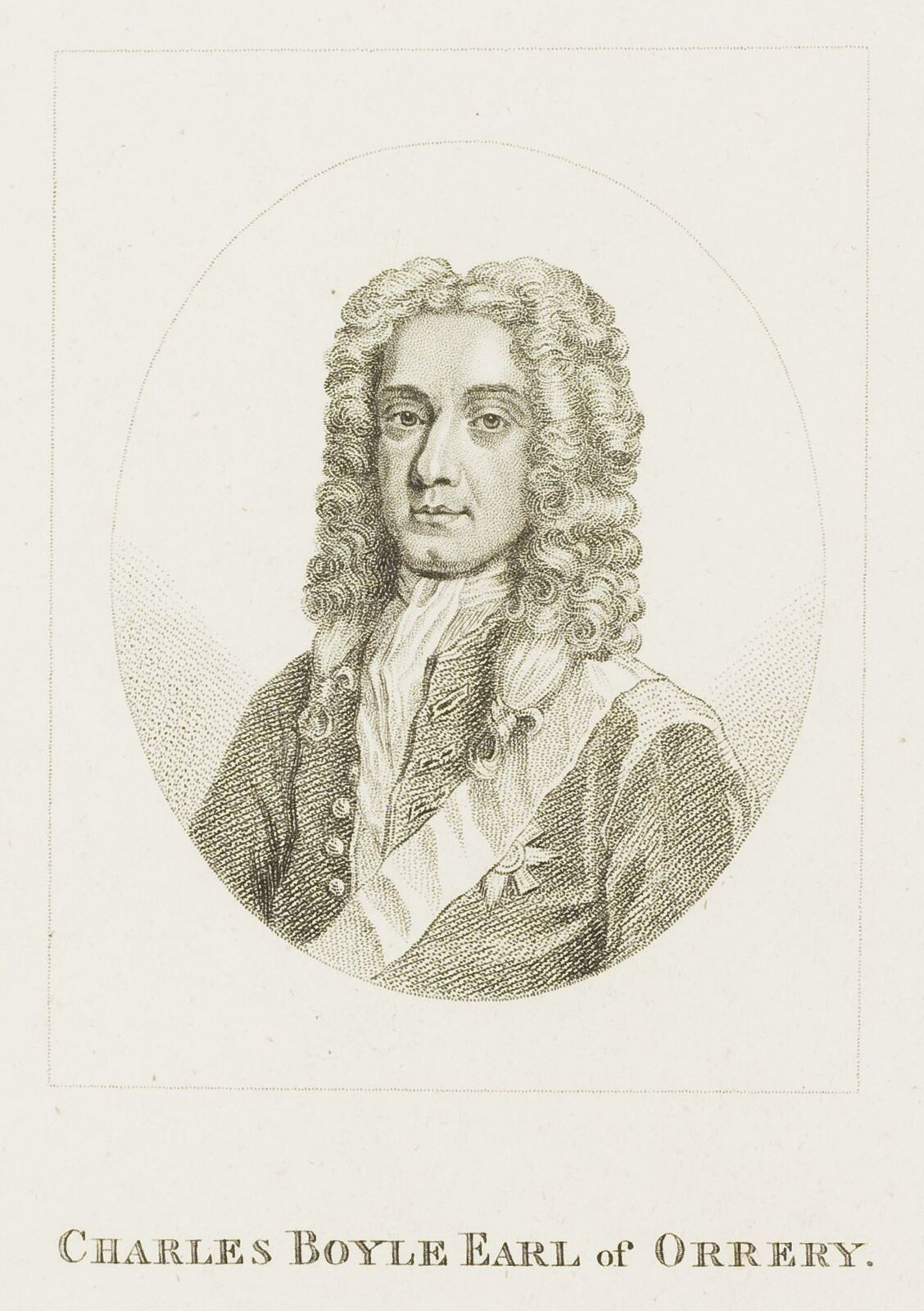
Charles Boyle

Like the first earl, he was an author, soldier and statesman. He translated Plutarch's life of Lysander, and published an edition of the epistles of Phalaris, which engaged him in the famous controversy with Bentley. He was a member of the Irish Parliament and sat for Charleville between 1695 and 1699. He was three times member for the town of Huntingdon; and on the death of his brother, Lionel, 3rd earl, in 1703, he succeeded to the title.

In 1706, he married Lady Elizabeth Cecil, daughter of John Cecil, 5th Earl of Exeter and Lady Anne Cavendish, at Burghley House. Their son and heir, John, was born the following year.

He joined the British Army, attaining the rank of brigadier by 1709, (when he became a major general), and was sworn one of Her Majesty's Privy Council in 1711; he distinguished himself at the Battle of the Wood. He was appointed to the Order of the Thistle in 1704, and appointed queen's envoy to the states of Brabant and Flanders; and having discharged this trust with ability, he was created a British peer, as Baron Boyle of Marston, in Somerset (1711). He inherited the estate in 1714.

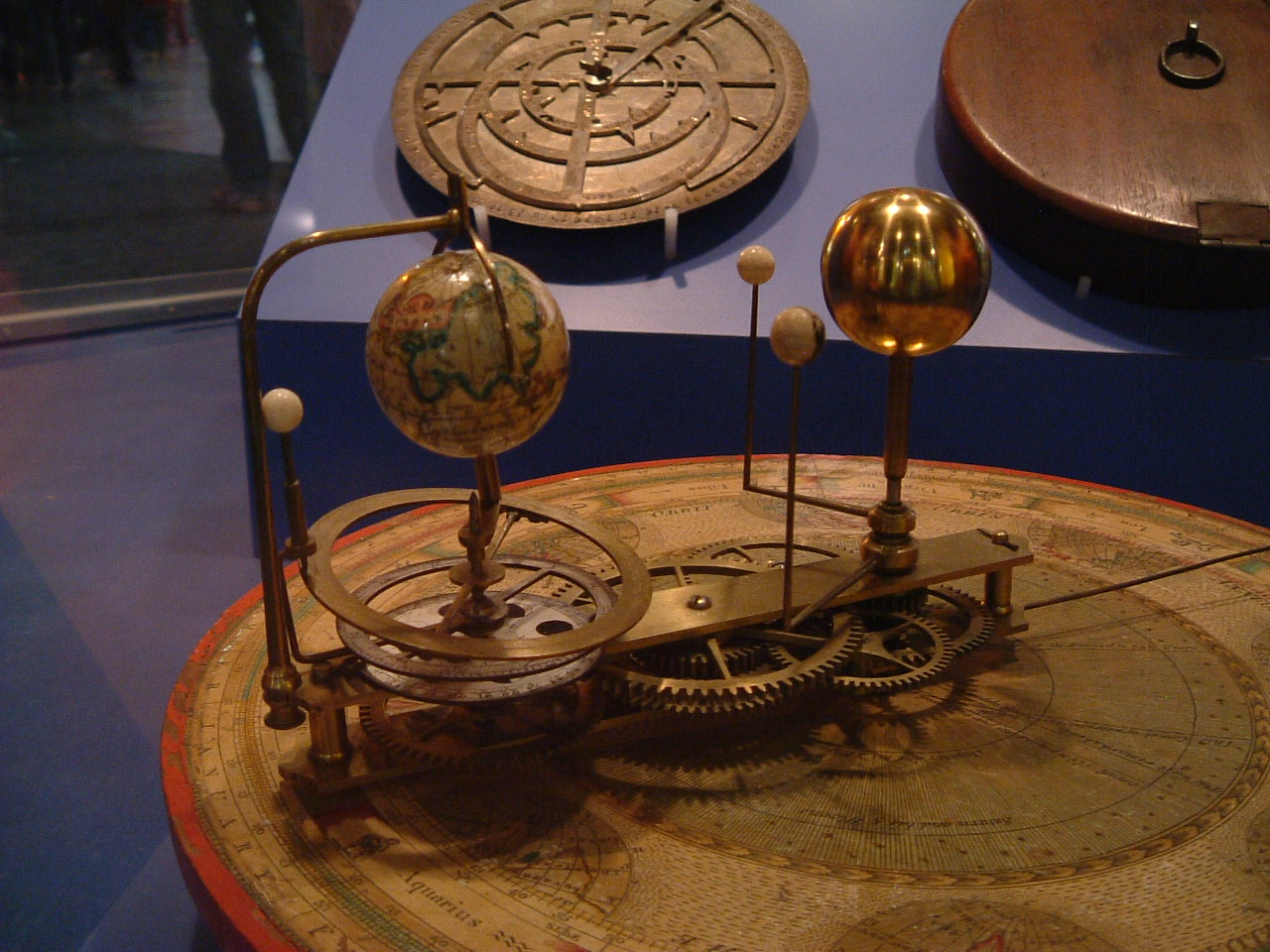
An orrery, a model of the Solar System named after the 4th Earl of Orrery

Boyle became a Fellow of the Royal Society in 1706. In 1713, under the patronage of Boyle, clockmaker George Graham created the first mechanical Solar System model that could demonstrate proportional motion of the planets around the Sun. The device was named the orrery in the Earl's honour.

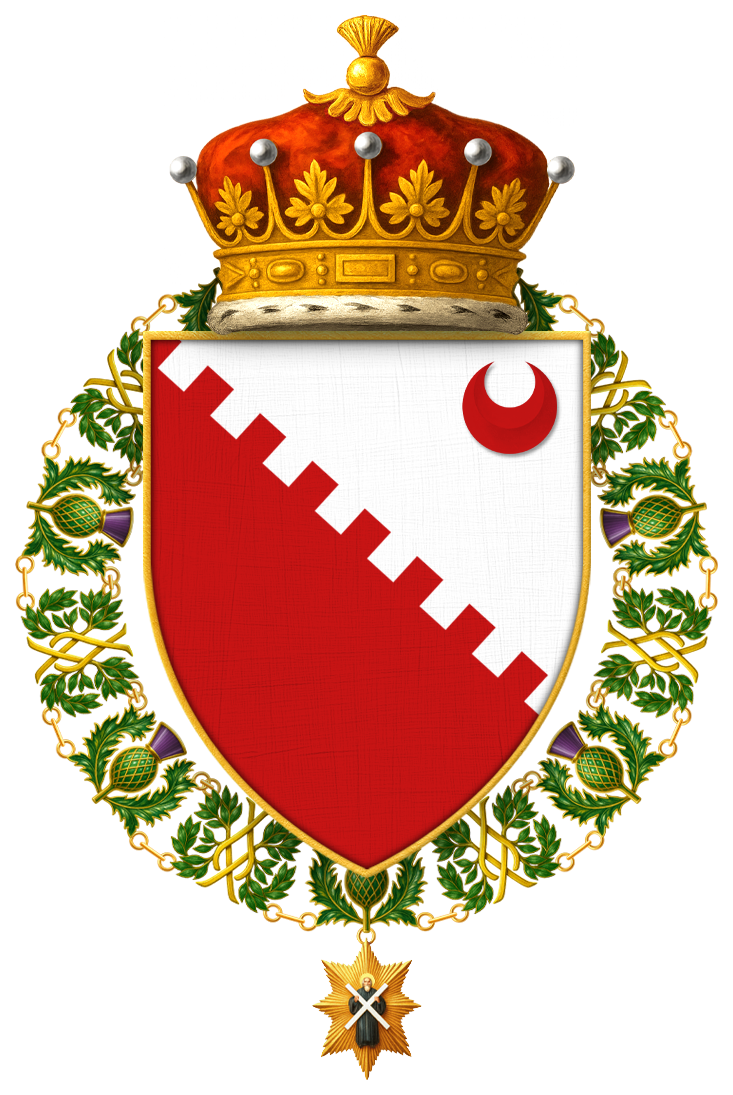
Shield of Arms of Charles Boyle, 4th Earl of Orrery, KT, PC, FRS, surmounting the collar of the Order of the Thistle

Charles Boyle received several additional honours in the reign of George I; but having had the misfortune to fall under the suspicion of the government for playing a part in the Jacobite Atterbury Plot, he was committed to the Tower in 1722, where he remained six months, and was then admitted to bail. On a subsequent inquiry, he was discharged.

Boyle wrote a comedy, As You Find It, printed in 1703 and later published together with the plays of the first earl.

In 1728, he was listed as one of the subscribers to the Cyclopaedia of Ephraim Chambers.

== Later life ==
Boyle died at his house in Westminster in 1731 and was buried in Westminster Abbey. He bequeathed his personal library and collection of scientific instruments to Christ Church Library; the instruments are now on display in the Museum of the History of Science, Oxford.

His son John, the 5th Earl of Orrery, succeeded to the earldom of Cork on the failure of the elder branch of the Boyle family, as earl of Cork and Orrery.

== Bibliography ==
- Smith, Lawrence Berkley (1994). Charles Boyle, 4th Earl of Orrery, 1674–1731 (PhD). University of Edinburgh.

Parliament of Ireland
Preceded by Henry Boreman; George Crofts	Member of Parliament for Charleville; 1695–1699; With: John Ormsby	Succeeded by George Evans; Robert FitzGerald
Parliament of England
Preceded by Francis Wortley Montagu; Edward Carteret	Member of Parliament for Huntingdon; 1701–1705; With: Francis Wortley Montagu 1701–1702; Anthony Hammond 1702–1705	Succeeded by Sir John Cotton, Bt; Edward Wortley-Montagu
Honorary titles
Preceded by The Duke of Ormonde	Lord Lieutenant of Somerset; 1714–1715	Succeeded by George Dodington
Preceded by The Earl Poulett	Custos Rotulorum of Somerset; 1714–1715	Succeeded by George Dodington
Peerage of Ireland
Preceded by Lionel Boyle	Earl of Orrery; 1703–1731	Succeeded by John Boyle
Peerage of Great Britain
New creation	Baron Boyle of Marston; 1711–1731	Succeeded by John Boyle
