= John Lysaght, 1st Baron Lisle =

Irish peer and politician

Member of the Parliament of Ireland for Charleville
- In office 1727–1758 Serving with: Price Hartstonge 1727–1744; Edward Barry 1744–1758
- Preceded by: Henry Purdon; James O'Brien
- Succeeded by: Hamilton Boyle, Viscount Dungarvon; Edward Barry

Personal details
- Born: 1702
- Died: 15 July 1781
- Children: John Lysaght, 2nd Baron Lisle

John Lysaght, 1st Baron Lisle of Mountnorth, in the County of Cork (1702 – 15 July 1781), was an Irish peer in the Peerage of Ireland and a politician.

The eldest son of Nicholas Lysaght and Grace, daughter of Colonel Thomas Holmes of Kilmallock, County Cork, John was educated at Trinity College, Dublin. His father Nicholas was a Protestant landowner in southern Ireland, a soldier he served with William III's invading Orange army at the Battle of Boyne in 1689 as a Colonel of Horse. John's grandfather, also named John Lysaght was a Cornet in the army under Lord Inchiquin who was engaged to quell the Catholic rising in 1641 that led to a bloody massacre in the north of Protestant Scots settler of the Ulster Plantation. The ensuing row in the House of Commons precipitated the fall of the Earl of Strafford, and the opening conflict of the English Civil War the following year.

John Lysaght sat as a Member of the Irish House of Commons for Charleville from 1727 until 1758, when on 18 September he was raised to the Peerage of Ireland as Baron Lisle, of Mountnorth in the County of Cork.

== Family ==
He married on 17 December 1725, Catherine Deane, third daughter and coheiress of Joseph Deane, of Crumlin, Chief Baron of the Irish Exchequer, by Margaret, sister of Henry Boyle, 1st Earl of Shannon. They had five children.

- John Lysaght, 2nd Baron Lisle
- Joseph married Henrietta, widow of John Godsell and eldest daughter of Arthur St Leger, 1st Viscount Doneraile. He died without heirs in 1799.
- James died unmarried
- Margaret married William Hodder of Huddersfield, Yorkshire
- Mary married Kingsmill Pennefather, MP for Cashel, eldest son and heir of Richard Pennefather of New Park, County Tipperary.

His first wife died, and in 1746 the Baron married secondly Elizabeth, only daughter of Edward Moore of Mooresfort, County Tipperary, by whom he had further issue.

He died in July 1781 and was succeeded in the barony by his son John.

Parliament of Ireland
Preceded by Henry Purdon; James O'Brien	Member of Parliament for Charleville; 1727–1758; With: Price Hartstonge 1727–1744; Edward Barry 1744–1758	Succeeded by Hamilton Boyle, Viscount Dungarvon; Edward Barry
Peerage of Ireland
New creation	Baron Lisle; 1758–1781	Succeeded by John Lysaght
