= Roger Boyle, 1st Earl of Orrery =

Anglo-Irish soldier and politician (1621–1679)

The Right Honourable The Earl of Orrery
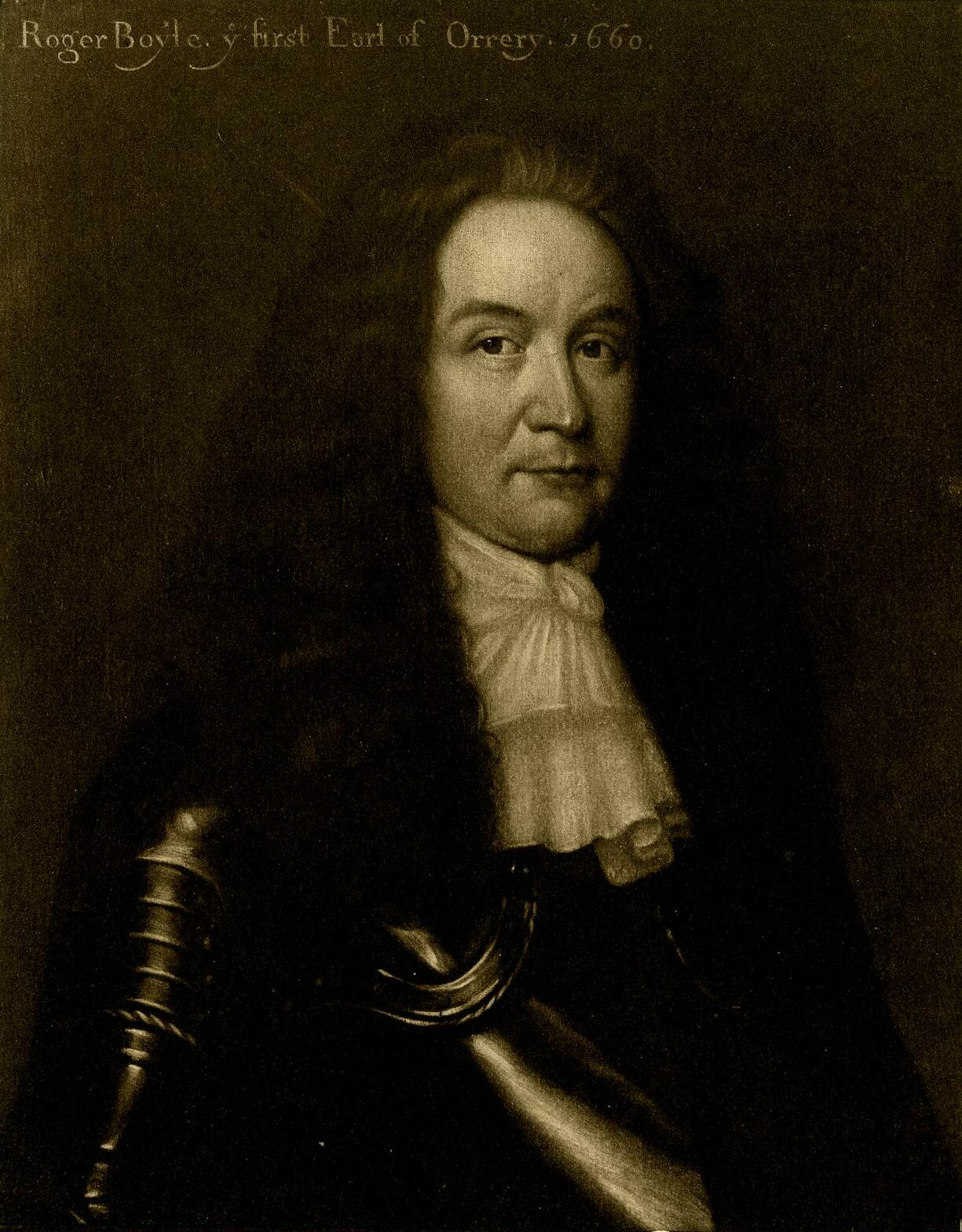

Privy Council of England
- In office 26 May 1661 – 21 April 1679 (Note: Dismissed)

Lord Lieutenant of Clare
- In office 1661–1672

Lord President of Munster
- In office 1661 – 31 July 1672 (Note: Office suppressed)

Constable, Limerick Castle
- In office 1661 – October 1679 †

Member of Parliament for Arundel
- In office 1660–1679

President of the Council in Scotland
- In office March 1655 – March 1656

Member of the Protectorate Parliament for County Cork
- In office 1654 – 10 December 1657

Personal details
- Born: 25 April 1621 Lismore Castle, County Waterford
- Died: 16 October 1679 (aged 58) Castlemartyr, County Cork
- Spouse: Margaret Howard (1641 to his death)
- Relations: Robert Boyle
- Children: Margaret (1644–1683); Roger (1646–1682); Henry (1648–1693); Barbara;
- Parent(s): Richard Boyle, 1st Earl of Cork; Catherine Fenton Boyle
- Education: Trinity College, Dublin

Military service
- Years of service: 1641 to 1651
- Battles/wars: Irish Confederate Wars; Battle of Liscarroll; Battle of Macroom; Siege of Limerick; Battle of Knocknaclashy

Roger Boyle, 1st Earl of Orrery (Note: styled Lord Broghill from 1628 to 1660) (25 April 1621 – 16 October 1679) was an Anglo-Irish soldier and politician. A younger son of the Earl of Cork, the largest landowner in Munster, like many Irish Protestants he supported the Dublin Castle administration during the Irish Confederate Wars, a related conflict of the Wars of the Three Kingdoms.

Boyle was noted for his anti-Catholicism, and consistently opposed concessions to Irish Catholics. A skilled politician, he believed that maintaining the Protestant Ascendancy in Ireland required support from the ruling government in London, whatever its composition. As a result, he held senior positions under the Commonwealth and Charles II, following the 1660 Stuart Restoration.

A noted writer on 17th-century warfare, Boyle helped design Charles Fort outside Kinsale. He also produced a number of plays and poems, which were well regarded by contemporaries but have since faded into obscurity.

== Personal details ==
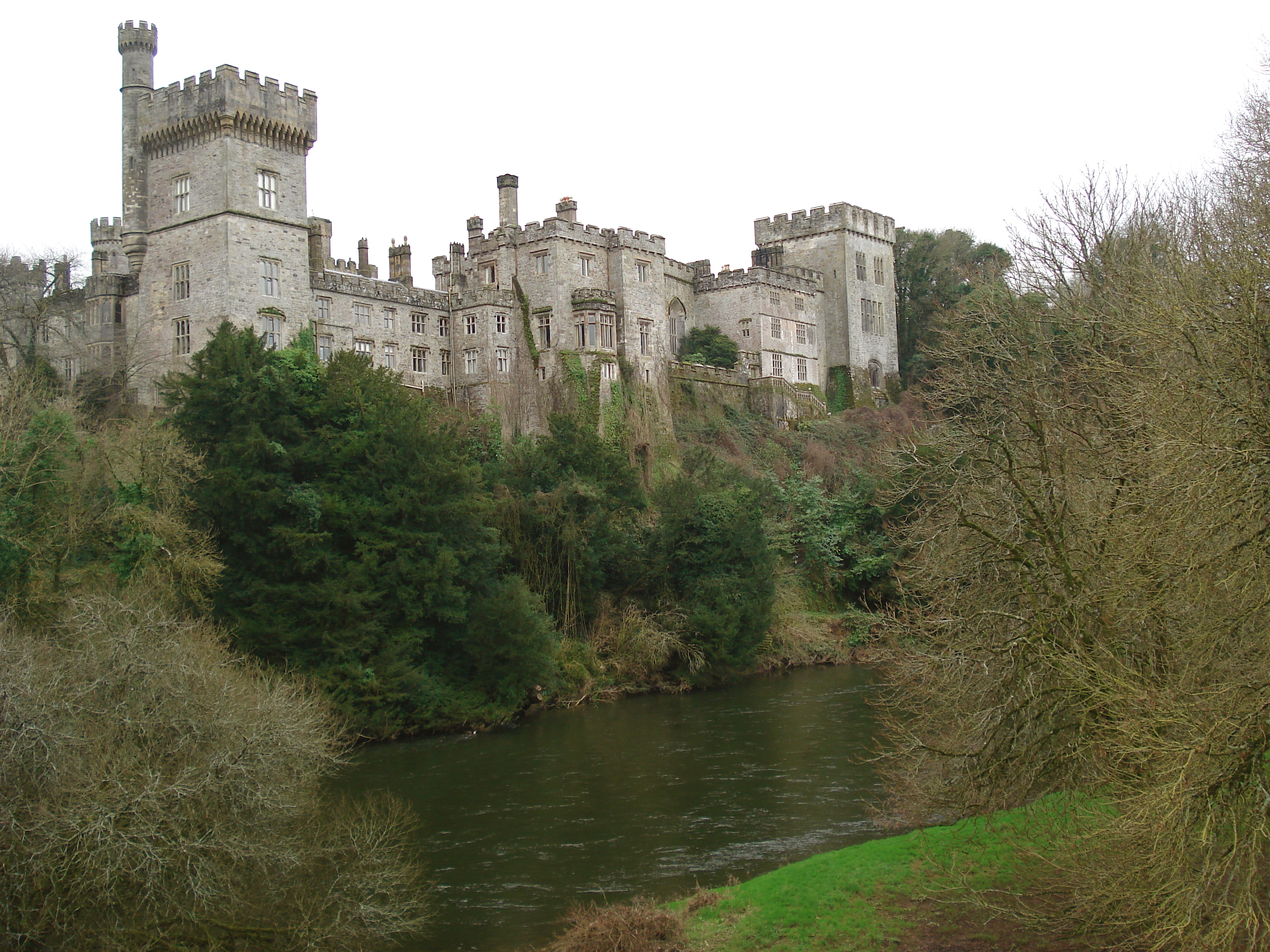
Boyle's birthplace, Lismore Castle (restored in 19th century)

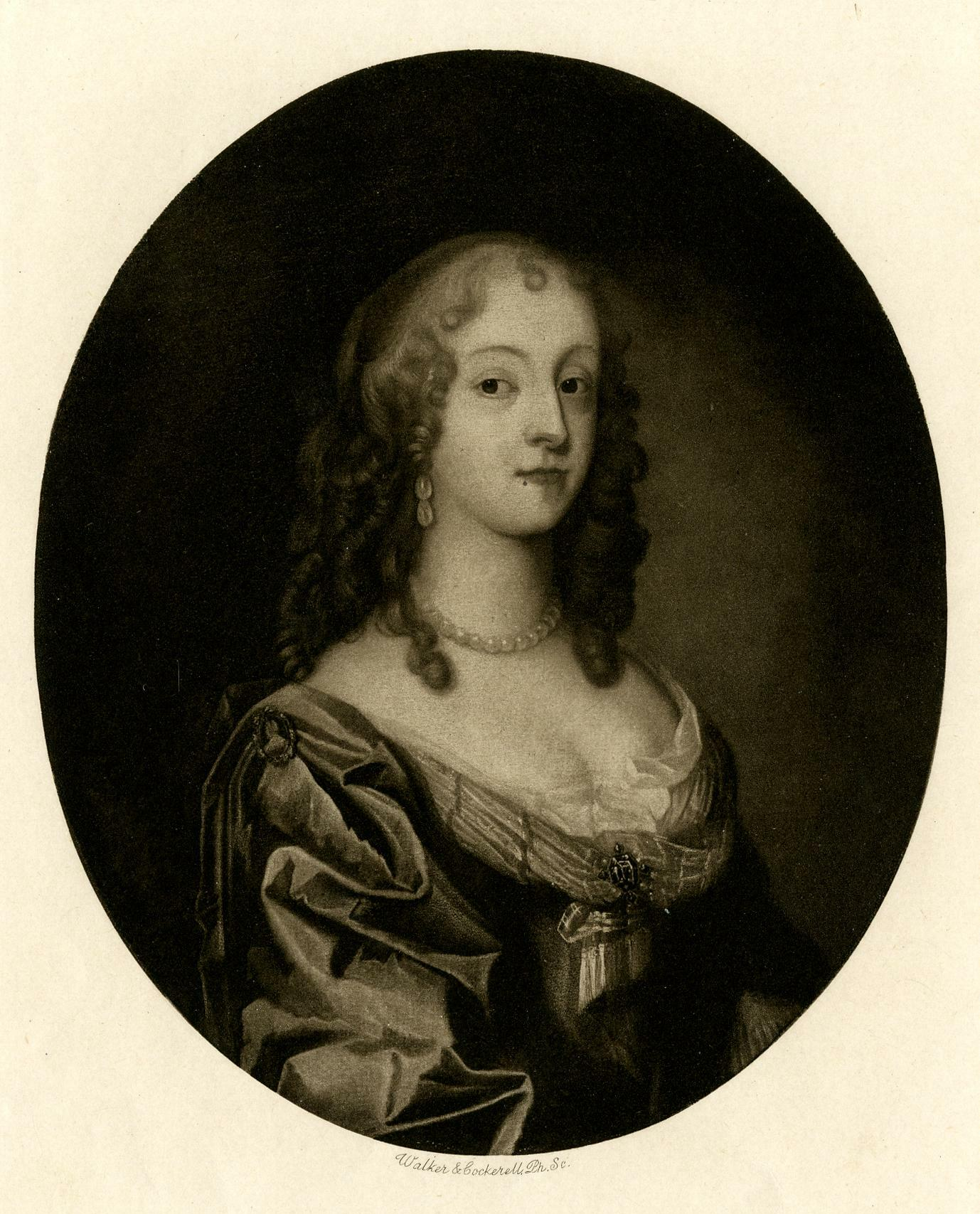
Portrait of Lady Margaret Howard

Roger Boyle was born 25 April 1621, twelfth born and third surviving son of Richard Boyle, 1st Earl of Cork (1566–1643), and his second wife, Catherine Fenton Boyle (1588–1630). A few months before his 7th birthday, his father granted him the Broghill estate in County Cork, and he was created Baron of Broghill in the Peerage of Ireland.

His parents had a total of fifteen children, ten of whom survived into adulthood. The most notable included his eldest brother Richard (1612–1698), Katherine (1615–1691), a member of the Hartlib Circle, Mary Rich, Countess of Warwick (1624–1678), and the chemist Robert Boyle (1627–1691).

In January 1641, he married Lady Margaret Howard (1623–1689), a daughter of the Theophilus Howard, 2nd Earl of Suffolk. Their joyful wedding was immortalised in verse by Sir John Suckling as A Ballad upon a Wedding. The couple had five daughters and two sons, his heir Roger (1646–1682), and Henry (1648–1693), father of the Earl of Shannon. His eldest daughter, Elizabeth, married in September 1660 to Folliott Wingfield, 1st Viscount Powerscourt. His third daughter, Margaret, married in December 1665 to William O'Brien, 2nd Earl of Inchiquin.

== Career ==
Boyle entered Trinity College, Dublin in 1630, then moved to London in 1632, where he briefly attended law school at Gray's Inn in March 1636. He and his elder brother Lewis (1619–1642) spent the next three years traveling in Europe, where they studied languages, mathematics and military theory. When the two returned to England in 1639, their father encouraged them to serve Charles I in the Bishops' Wars against the Covenanters.

== Rebellion and civil war ==
Boyle returned to Ireland on the outbreak of the rebellion in 1641 and fought with his brothers against the Irish rebels at the battle of Liscarroll in September 1642. Boyle and in Ireland were left vulnerable by the outbreak of the First English Civil War. Although initially under the command of the Royalist Marquis of Ormonde (later James Butler, 1st Duke of Ormonde), Lord Broghill consented to serve under the parliamentary commissioners in Cork against the Irish Confederates. Boyle fought with the Parliamentarians until the execution of the king, when he retired altogether from public affairs and took up his residence at Marston in Somerset.

Subsequently, he originated a scheme to bring about the Restoration. On his way abroad to consult with King Charles II, he was unexpectedly visited by Oliver Cromwell in London. Cromwell informed him that his plans were well known to the council and warned against persisting in them. Cromwell offered him a command in Ireland against the rebels that entailed no obligation except faithful service. It was accepted.

Boyle's assistance in Ireland proved invaluable during the Cromwellian conquest of Ireland. Appointed master of the ordnance, he soon assembled a body of infantry and horse, driving the rebels into Kilkenny, where they surrendered; he induced the Royalist garrison of Cork (English troops with whom he had served earlier in the wars) to defect back to the Parliamentarian side. On 10 May 1650, he completely defeated at Macroom a force of Irish advancing to the relief of Cork. On Cromwell's departure for Scotland, Boyle cooperated with Henry Ireton, whom he joined at the siege of Limerick. In 1651 he defeated an Irish force marching to Limerick's relief under Lord Muskerry at the battle of Knocknaclashy, the final battle of the Irish Confederate Wars, thus effecting the capture of the town.

By this time Broghill had become a fast friend and follower of Cromwell, whose stern measures in Ireland and support of the English and Protestants were welcomed after the policy of concession to the Irish initiated by Charles I. He was returned as member for the county of Cork in 1654 to the First Protectorate Parliament and in 1656 to the Second Protectorate Parliament and also in the latter assembly for Edinburgh, for which he elected to sit. He served this year as Lord President of the Council in Scotland, where he won much popularity. He lodged in Edinburgh at Old Moray House. When he returned to England he was included in the inner cabinet of Cromwell's council, and nominated in 1657 as a member of the new House of Lords. He was one of those most in favour of Cromwell's assumption of the royal title, and proposed a union between the Protector's daughter Frances and Charles II.

== Restoration ==
On Oliver Cromwell's death, Boyle gave his support to Richard Cromwell; but as he saw no possibility of maintaining the government, he left for Ireland, whereby resuming command in Munster he secured the island for Charles, anticipating Monck's overtures by inviting the King to land at Cork. Soon after, he was a leading figure in the Irish Convention alongside Sir Charles Coote. In 1660, he was elected MP for Arundel in the Convention Parliament, although he was busily engaged in Ireland at the time of the election. On 5 September 1660 he was created Earl of Orrery. The same year he was appointed one of the three Lord Justices (Ireland) and drew up the Act of Settlement 1662. In 1661, he was re-elected MP for Arundel in the Cavalier Parliament. He founded the town of Charleville, County Cork, near his estate at Broghill. However, his mansion house in Broghill was burned down by Irish forces before the end of the century.

He continued to exercise his office as lord-president of Munster till 1668, when he resigned it on account of disputes with the duke of Ormonde, the lord-lieutenant. On 25 November, he was impeached by the House of Commons for "raising of money by his own authority upon his majesty's subjects," but the prorogation of parliament by the king interrupted the proceedings, which were not afterwards renewed. In 1673 he was appointed Custos Rotulorum of County Limerick, which position he held until his death.

== Boyle's writings ==
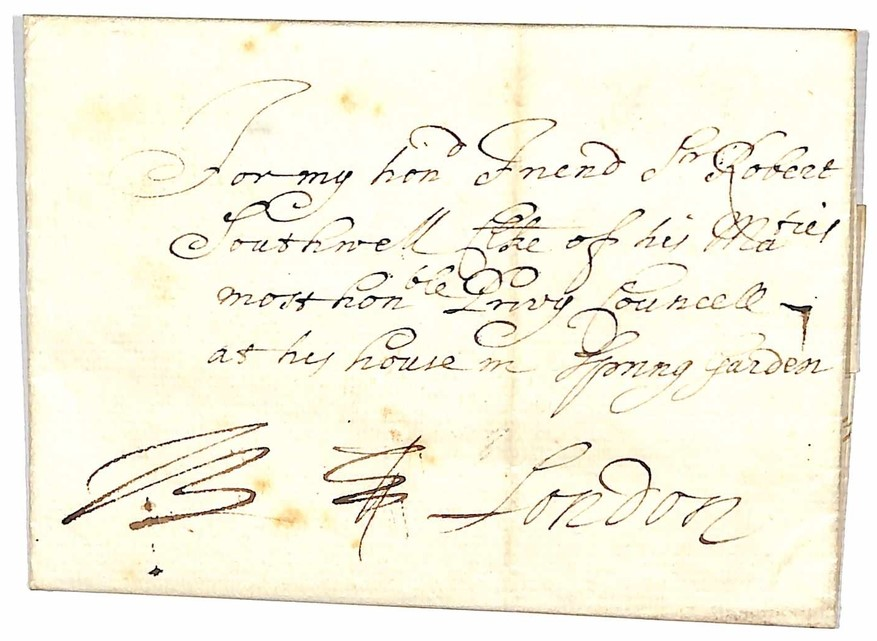
Letter signed by Roger Boyle

In addition to Lord Orrery's achievements as a statesman and administrator, he gained some reputation as a writer and a dramatist. He was the author of:

- An Answer to a Scandalous Letter ... A Full Discovery of the Treachery of the Irish Rebels (1662), printed with the letter itself in his State Letters (1742)
- Another answer to the same letter entitled Irish Colors Displayed ... also ascribed to him
- Parthenissa, a novel (1651, 1654–56, 1669)
- English-Adventures by a Person of Honor (1676), from which Otway drew his tragedy of the Orphan
- A Treatise of the Art of War (1677), a work of considerable historical value

There are some poems, of little interest, including verses:

- On His Majesty's Happy Restoration (unprinted)
- On the Death of Abraham Cowley (1677)
- The Dream (unprinted)
- Poems on most of the Festivals of the Church (1681)

Plays in verse. See: Verse Drama, and his influence on John Dryden.

- Henry V (1664), heroic drama
- The Generall (1664), a tragi-comedy. Samuel Pepys, 4 October 1664, called it "so dull and so ill-acted, that I think it is the worst I ever saw or heard in all my days."
- Mustapha (1665), tragedy
- Tryphon : a tragedy (acted 1668, Printed for H. Herringman, 1669)
- The Black Prince (acted 1667; printed 1669), heroic drama
- Herod the Great (published 1694 but unacted), tragedy
- Altemira (1702), tragedy
- Guzman (1669), comedy
- Mr. Anthony (1690), comedy

A collected edition was published in 1737, to which was added the fourth earl's comedy As You Find It. The General is also attributed to him.

== Sources ==
- Barnard, Toby (2004). "Boyle, Roger (1621-1679)". Oxford Dictionary of National Biography (online ed.). Oxford University Press. doi:10.1093/ref:odnb/3138. (Subscription, Wikipedia Library access or UK public library membership required.)
- Barnard, Toby (2008). "Boyle, Richard, first earl of Cork (1566-1643)". Oxford Dictionary of National Biography (online ed.). Oxford University Press. doi:10.1093/ref:odnb/3133. (Subscription, Wikipedia Library access or UK public library membership required.)
- Manning, Roger (2003). Swordsmen: The Martial Ethos in the Three Kingdoms. OUP. ISBN 978-0199261215.
- Morrice, Thomas (1742). State Letters of Roger Boyle, 1st Earl of Orrery, edited with his life.
- Additional manuscripts (Brit. Mus.) 25,287 (letter-book when governor of Munster), and 32,095 sqq. 109–188 (letters);
- Article in the Oxford Dictionary of National Biography (2002)
- Athenae Oxonienses. Vol. iii. p. 1200.
- Biographia.
- "Preface". Orrery Papers. 1893.
- "Life of Roger Boyle". Contemporary History of Affairs in Ireland. 1879–1880.
- "Calendar of State Papers, Irish and Domestic".
- Wilson, Joshua (1808). A Biographical Index to the Present House of Lords. T. Goddard, G. Richards and Cradock and Joy.

Parliament of England
Preceded by John Downes	Member of Parliament for Arundel with The Viscount Falkland 1660; Sir John Trevor 1660–1661; The Lord Aungier of Longford 1661–1679; 1660 – 1679	Succeeded by William Garway; James Butler
Peerage of Ireland
New title	Earl of Orrery; 1660–1679	Succeeded by Roger Boyle
New title	Baron Boyle of Broghill; 1627–1679	Succeeded by Roger Boyle
