= John Boyle, 5th Earl of Cork =

Anglo-Irish writer (1707–1762)

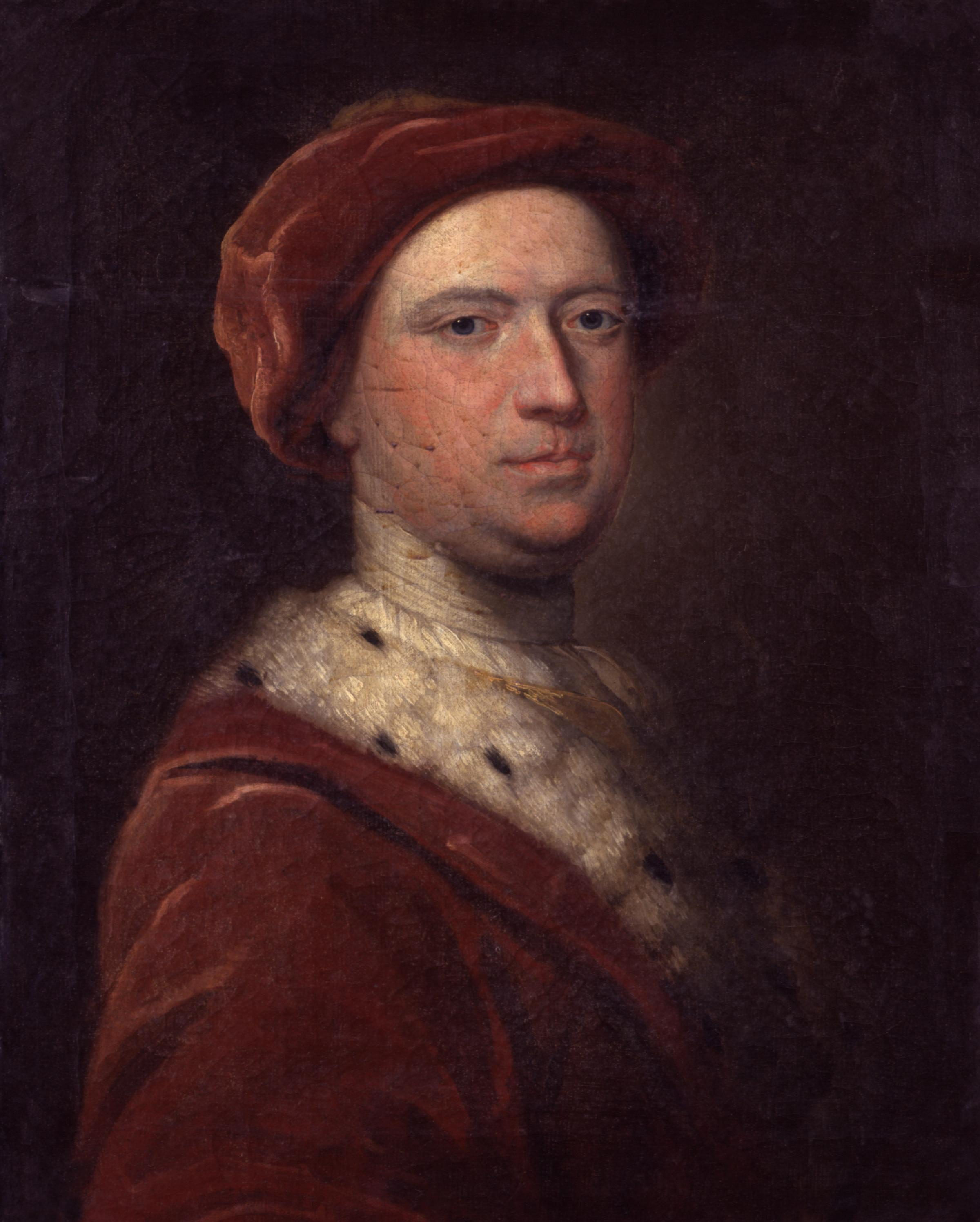
The Earl of Cork.

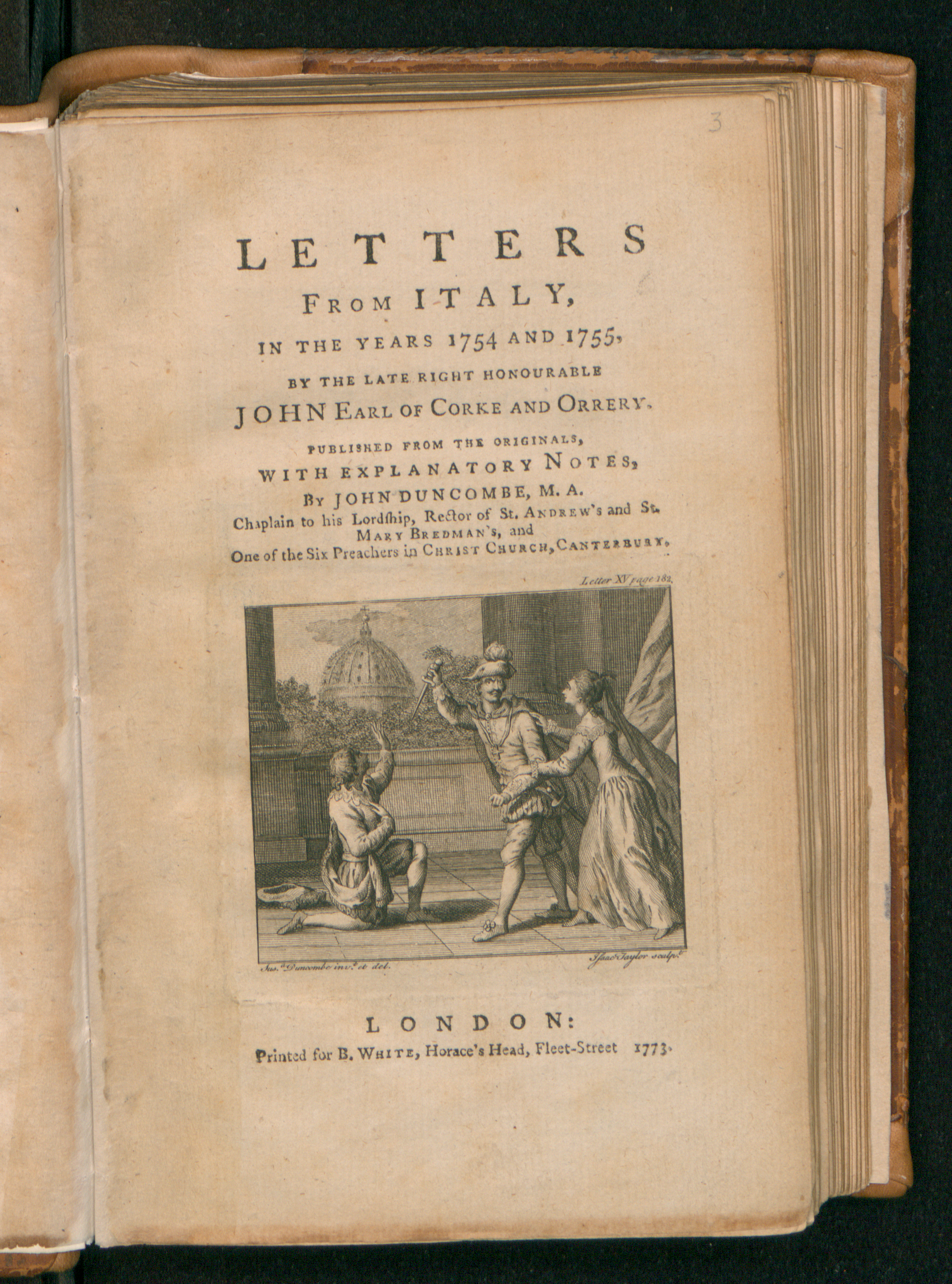
Letters from Italy, in the years 1754 and 1755 (1773)

John Boyle, 5th Earl of Cork and 5th Earl of Orrery, FRS (13 January 1707 – 16 November 1762) was an Anglo-Irish writer and a friend of Jonathan Swift, Alexander Pope and Samuel Johnson.

Boyle was the only son of Charles Boyle, 4th Earl of Orrery, and his wife Lady Elizabeth Cecil (1687–1708), daughter of John Cecil, 5th Earl of Exeter. He was born at Westminster and attended Christ Church, Oxford. In 1743, he was one of several leading Tories who communicated with the French government through Francis Sempill in order to elicit French support for an invasion to restore the Stuart line. He published a translation of the letters of Pliny the Younger in 1751, Remarks on the Life and Writings of Jonathan Swift in the same year, and the Memoirs of Robert Carey, 1st Earl of Monmouth. His Letters from Italy was published in 1773.

== Family ==
He was married twice, first to Henrietta, daughter of George Hamilton, 1st Earl of Orkney and his wife Elizabeth Hamilton, Countess of Orkney. His eldest son, Charles Boyle, Viscount Dungarvan, predeceased him and he was succeeded as Earl of Cork by his younger son Hamilton, who died in 1764 and passed the earldom to John's next son, Edmund. Elizabeth (b.1731), one of his daughters by his first wife, married Sir Thomas Worsley, 6th Baronet, and one of their children was Sir Richard Worsley, 7th Baronet. His second wife was Margaret Hamilton, daughter of John Hamilton of Caledon and Lucy Dopping. She owned considerable estates in Ulster. Their daughter Lucy (b.1744) married George Byng, 4th Viscount Torrington.

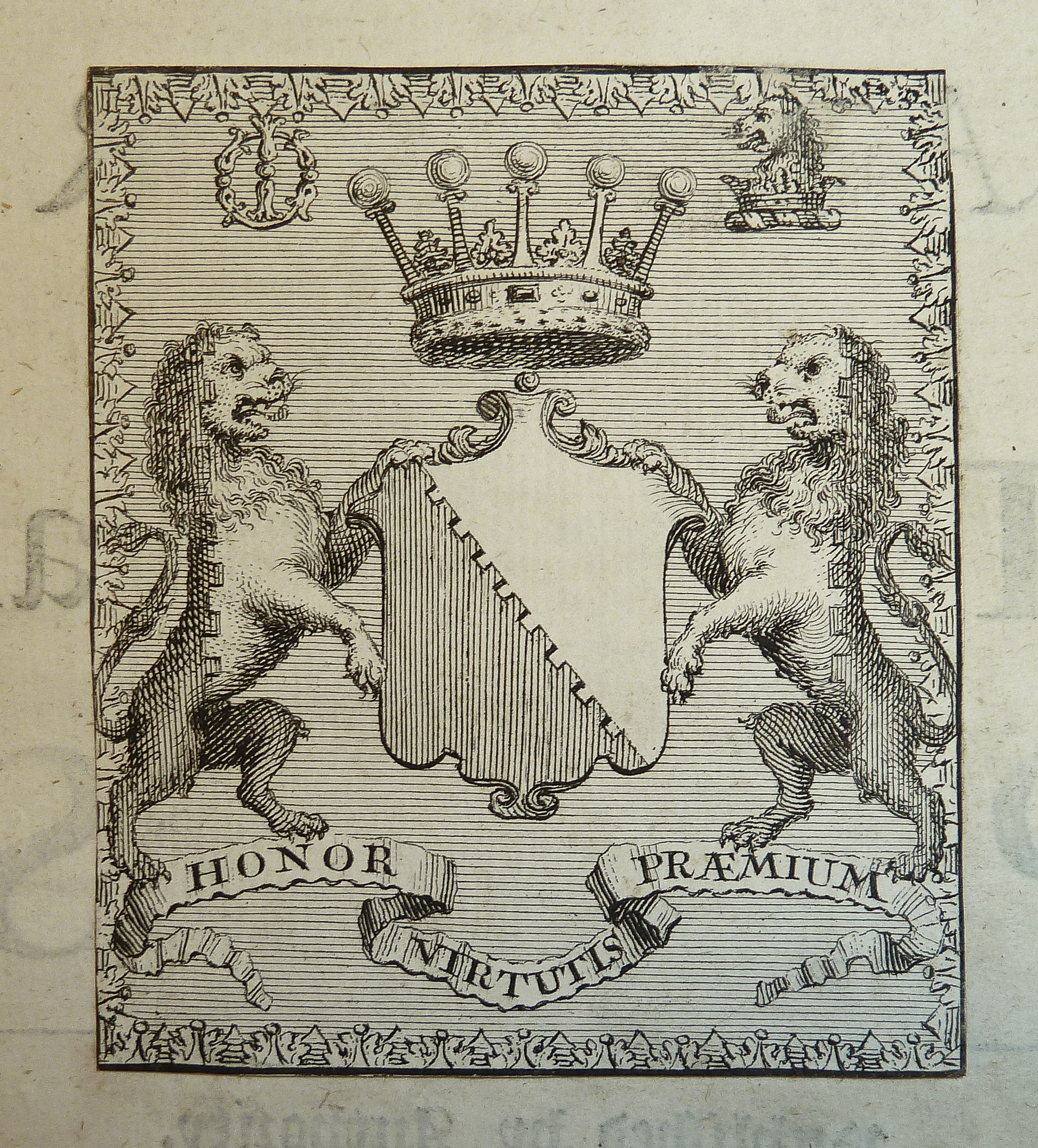
Arms of the 5th Earl of Orrery

Peerage of Ireland
Preceded by Richard Boyle	Earl of Cork; 1753–1762	Succeeded by Hamilton Boyle
Preceded by Charles Boyle	Earl of Orrery; 1731–1762	Succeeded by Hamilton Boyle
