= Hamilton Boyle, 6th Earl of Cork =

Hamilton Boyle, 6th Earl of Cork and 6th Earl of Orrery (3 February 1729 – 17 January 1764) was the son of John Boyle, 5th Earl of Cork and Lady Henrietta Hamilton. He inherited the titles of 6th Earl of Cork and Orrery and 3rd Baron Boyle of Marston from his father in 1762.

He served in the Parliament of Great Britain as member of parliament (MP) for Warwick between 1751 and 1762, and represented Charleville in the Irish House of Commons between 1759 and 1760. He was unmarried and was succeeded by his brother.

Parliament of Ireland
Preceded by John Lysaght; Edward Barry	Member of Parliament for Charleville; 1759–1760; With: Edward Barry	Succeeded by Robert Barry; Richard Longfield
Parliament of Great Britain
Preceded by Henry Archer; John Spencer	Member of Parliament for Warwick; 1761–1762; With: Henry Archer	Succeeded by Henry Archer; Paul Methuen
Peerage of Ireland
Preceded by John Boyle	Earl of Cork; Earl of Orrery; 1762–1764	Succeeded by Edmund Boyle
