= Roger Boyle, 2nd Earl of Orrery =

Irish peer and Member of Parliament

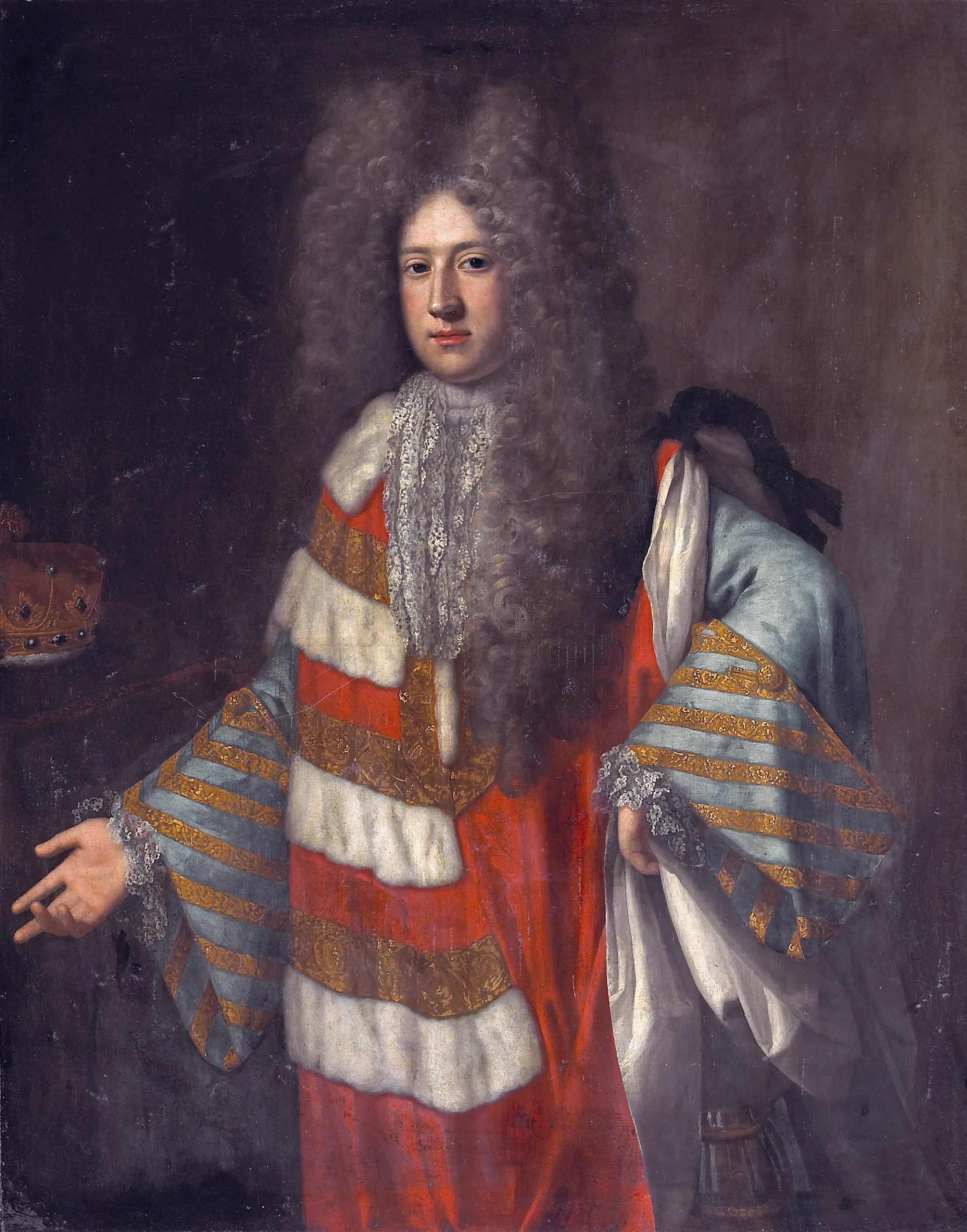
Roger Boyle, 2nd Earl of Orrery (attributed to Garret Morphy)

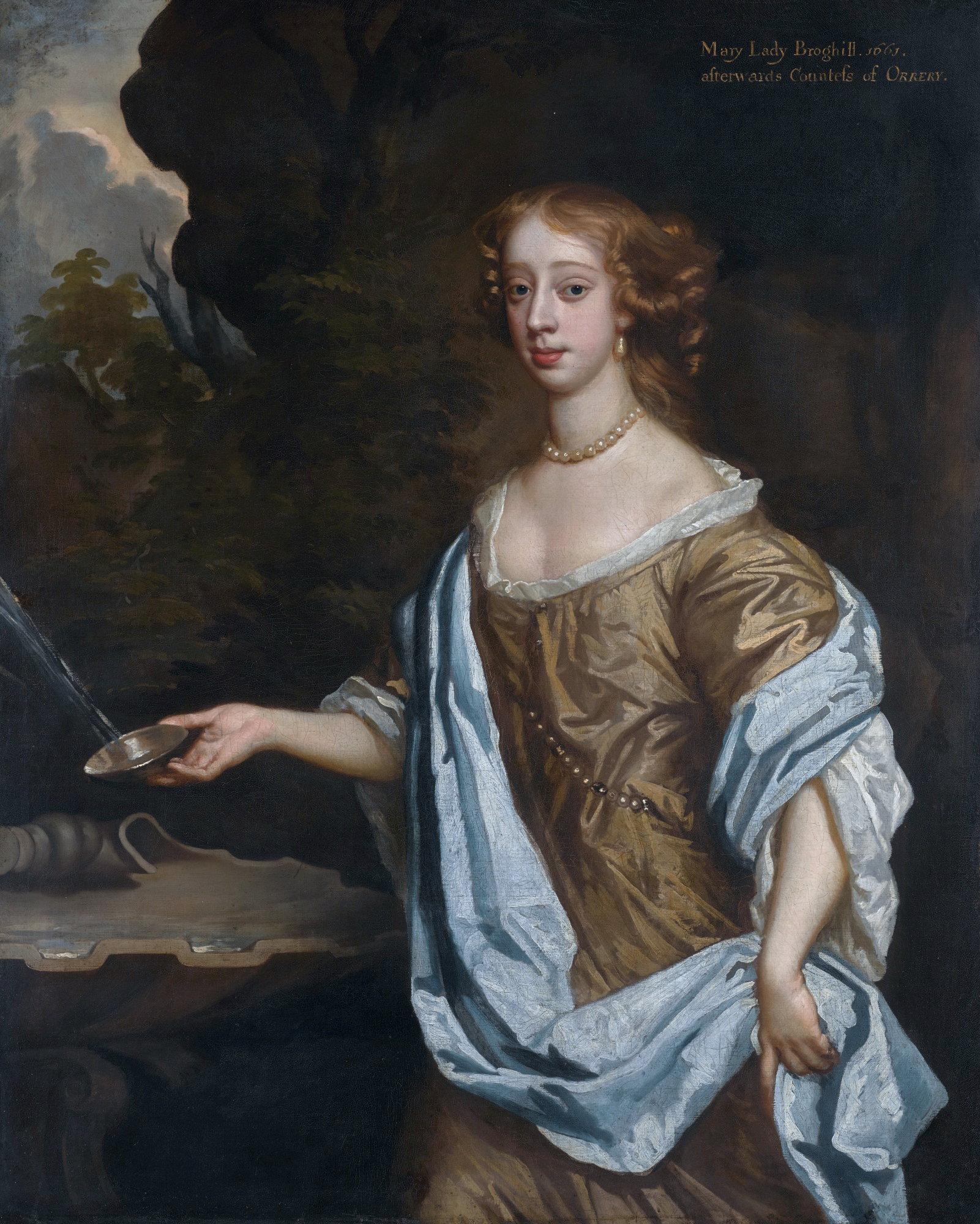
Mary, Countess of Orrery (studio of Peter Lely)

Roger Boyle, 2nd Earl of Orrery (24 August 1646 – 29 March 1682), styled Lord Broghill between 1660 and 1679, was an Irish peer and Member of Parliament.

Boyle was born in Dublin, the son of Roger Boyle, 1st Earl of Orrery, by Lady Margaret, daughter of Theophilus Howard, 2nd Earl of Suffolk. He was educated at Trinity College, Dublin. In 1665 he was returned to the Irish House of Commons for County Cork, a seat he held until the following year. In 1679 he succeeded his father in the earldom and entered the Irish House of Lords.

Lord Orrery married Mary, daughter of Richard Sackville, 5th Earl of Dorset, in 1665. He died in March 1682, aged 35, and was succeeded in the earldom by his eldest son, Lionel. The Countess of Orrery died in London in November 1710, aged 62.

Peerage of Ireland
Preceded by Roger Boyle	Earl of Orrery; 1679–1682	Succeeded by Lionel Boyle
