= Edmund Boyle, 7th Earl of Cork =

Irish peer and Somerset landowner

Edmund Boyle, 7th Earl of Cork and 7th Earl of Orrery (21 November 1742 – 30 May 1798) was an Irish peer and Somerset landowner.

== Family ==
A younger son of the 5th Earl of Cork and Margaret Hamilton, he succeeded to his half-brother's titles on 17 January 1764. He died, aged 56 in Marston House and was buried in St John's Church in Frome in Somerset.

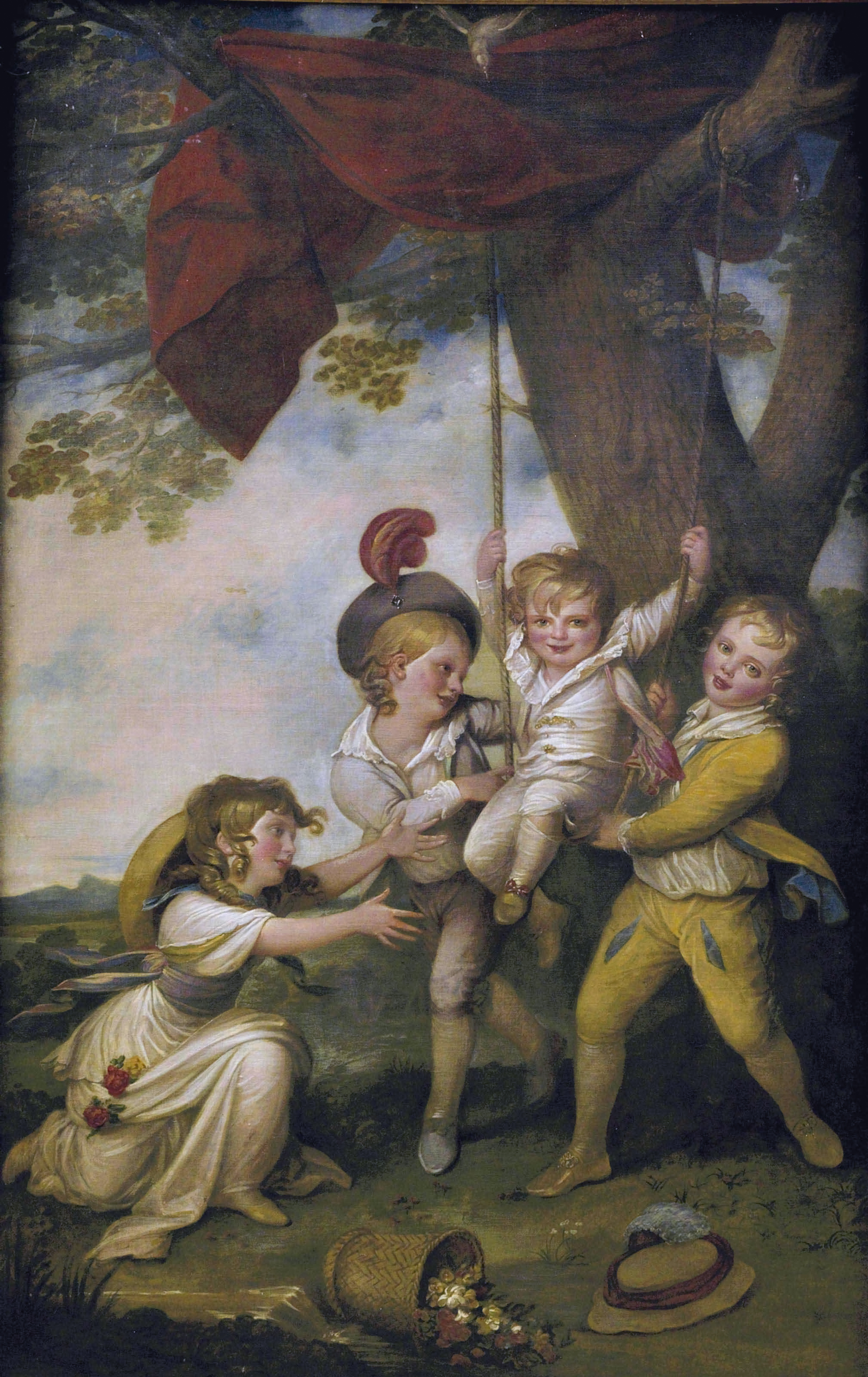
The children of Edmund Boyle (Richard Cosway)

On 31 August 1764, he married firstly Anne Courtenay (1742–1785), daughter and eventual heir of Kelland Courtenay (1707–1748). They had six children, including:

- John Richard Boyle, Viscount Dungarvan (27 May 1765 – 8 March 1768)
- General Edmund Boyle, 8th Earl of Cork (1767–1856)
- Vice-Admiral Sir Courtenay Boyle (1770–1884)
- Hon. Charles Boyle (1774–1800)
- Lady Lucy Isabella Boyle (died 7 September 1801), married 28 July 1792 the Hon Rev George Bridgeman

The marriage was dissolved in 1782, and on 17 June 1786, he married secondly Mary Monckton, daughter of the 1st Viscount Galway: her salon was one of the centres of intellectual life in London for half a century.

The ODNB considers that Charles Dickens used Maria, Lady Cork as the template for Mrs Leo Hunter in The Pickwick Papers and that 'Benjamin Disraeli, who knew Lady Cork well, is said to have described her accurately as Lady Bellair in his 1837 novel Henrietta Temple'.

== Militia career ==
In November 1774 Cork was commissioned as a captain in the Somerset Militia, and was promoted to major on 1 May 1778, just before the regiment was embodied for fulltime service during the American War of Independence. His company assembled at Bridgwater before the regiment left for home defence duties in the Plymouth defences and at Coxheath Camp in Kent. Cork was promoted to lieutenant-colonel in 1779 and was in active command of the regiment in the summer of 1781 while it was camped on Maker Heights. An inspecting officer found that the regiment had greatly improved under Cork's command. The following year the Somersets were part of 4th Brigade camped at Roborough. The Light Companies of the regiments in the brigade were detached to form a composite Light Battalion at Staddon, which Cork was selected to command. The Militia were disembodied early in 1783 at the conclusion of the war. Cork was promoted to colonel of the Somerset Militia on 23 November 1784, and retained the position until his death.

== Notes ==
Peerage of Ireland
Preceded by Hamilton Boyle	Earl of Cork; Earl of Orrery; 1764–1798	Succeeded by Edmund Boyle
