= Baron Clifford =

Title in the Peerage of England

Arms of Clifford: Checky or and azure, a fesse gules as borne by Robert de Clifford, 1st Baron de Clifford (c. 1274–1314), feudal baron of Skipton, as recorded in the famous Caerlaverock Roll of 1300

Baron Clifford is a title in the Peerage of England created by writ of summons on 17 February 1628 for Henry Clifford, the heir of Francis Clifford, 4th Earl of Cumberland. Francis was believed to hold the Barony de Clifford, created in 1299, which could therefore be used to give Henry a seat in the House of Lords during his father's lifetime via a writ of acceleration. However, it would later be determined that the barony had in fact passed to his niece, Lady Anne Clifford. The summons of 1628 therefore unintentionally created a new barony, held by Henry. In 1641, on his father's death, Henry inherited the earldom of Cumberland, which became extinct upon his own death in 1643.

Henry's only child, Lady Elizabeth Clifford, succeeded to the 1628 Clifford barony in her own right (although, as was customary in those days, she never made claim to it). In 1635, Elizabeth had married Richard Boyle, the heir of Richard Boyle, 1st Earl of Cork. The younger Boyle inherited his father's titles in 1643, but was unable to sit in the English House of Lords as they were all in the Peerage of Ireland. In 1644 he was therefore created Baron Clifford of Lanesborough in the Peerage of England, which allowed him to sit in the Lords. Boyle was created Earl of Burlington in 1664.

The 1628 and 1644 Clifford baronies remained with the Earls of Burlington and Cork until the death of the 3rd and last Earl of Burlington in 1753, when the earldom of Burlington and the Clifford of Lanesborough barony (i.e. the 1644 creation) became extinct.

The 1628 Clifford barony then devolved upon Charlotte Cavendish, Marchioness of Hartington, wife of the future 4th Duke of Devonshire. The barony was held by the Dukes of Devonshire until the death of William Cavendish, 6th Duke of Devonshire in 1858, since when it has been in abeyance.

== Barons Clifford (1628) ==
- Henry Clifford 1st Baron Clifford, 5th Earl of Cumberland (1591–1643) summoned to Parliament as Lord Clifford in 1628; succeeded to the earldom in 1641
- Elizabeth Boyle (née Clifford), Countess of Burlington and 2nd Baroness Clifford (1613–1691)
- Charles Boyle, 3rd Viscount Dungarvan, 3rd Baron Clifford (1639–1694)
- Charles Boyle, 4th Baron Clifford, 2nd Earl of Burlington, 3rd Earl of Cork (1660–1704)
- Richard Boyle, 5th Baron Clifford, 3rd Earl of Burlington, 4th Earl of Cork (1694–1753)
- Charlotte Elizabeth Cavendish, 6th Baroness Clifford (1731–1754)
- William Cavendish, 7th Baron Clifford, 5th Duke of Devonshire (1748–1811)
- William Spencer Cavendish, 8th Baron Clifford, 6th Duke of Devonshire (1790–1858), upon whose death in 1858 the barony became abeyant between his 2 sisters Georgiana and Harriet.

Current co-heirs to the barony are George Howard, 13th Earl of Carlisle (heir of the 8th baron's sister Georgiana) and Fergus Leveson-Gower, 6th Earl Granville (heir of the 8th baron's sister Harriet).

== Family tree ==
Dukes of Devonshire, Marquesses of Hartington, Earls of Burlington, Earls of Cork, Earls of Devonshire, and Earls of Orrery

William Cavendish (c. 1505–1557)	Bess of Hardwick (c. 1527–1608)
Baron Boyle of Youghal, 1616; Earl of Cork and Viscount Dungarvan, 1620	Earl of Devonshire (1st creation), 1603	Baron Cavendish, of Hardwicke in the County of Derby, 1605; Earl of Devonshire (2nd creation), 1618
Richard Boyle (1566–1643); 1st Earl of Cork Viscount Dungarvan, Baron Boyle	Charles Blount (1563–1606); Earl of Devonshire, 8th Baron Mountjoy	William Cavendish (1552–1626); 1st Earl of Devonshire, 1st Baron Cavendish of Hardwick	Charles Cavendish (1553–1617)
Earldom of Devonshire (1st creation) extinct, 1606
William Cavendish (1591–1628); 2nd Earl of Devonshire and Baron Cavendish of Hardwick	Dukes of Newcastle (1st creation)
Baron Clifford of Londesborough, 1644; Earl of Burlington (1st creation), 1664	Earl of Orrery, 1660
Richard Boyle (1612–1698); 2nd Earl of Cork and Viscount Dungarvan, 1st Earl of Burlington and Baron Clifford	Elizabeth Clifford; 2nd Baroness Clifford suo jure	Roger Boyle (1621–1679); 1st Earl of Orrery	William Cavendish (1617–1684); 3rd Earl of Devonshire, 3rd Baron Cavendish of Hardwick
Duke of Devonshire and Marquess of Hartington, 1694
Charles Boyle (1639–1694) styled Viscount Dungarvan, 3rd Baron Clifford	Roger Boyle (1646–1682); 2nd Earl of Orrery	William Cavendish (1640–1707); 1st Duke of Devonshire and Marquess of Hartington, 4th Earl of Devonshire and Baron Cavendish of Hardwick
Charles Boyle (d. 1704); 3rd Earl of Cork and Viscount Dungarvan, 2nd Earl of Burlington, 4th Baron Clifford	Lionel Boyle (1671–1703); 3rd Earl of Orrery	Charles Boyle (1674–1731); 4th Earl of Orrery	William Cavendish (1672–1729); 2nd Duke of Devonshire and Marquess of Hartington, 5th Earl of Devonshire
John Boyle (1707–1762); 5th Earl of Cork, Earl of Orrery, and Viscount Dungarvan	Richard Boyle (1694–1753); 4th Earl of Cork, 3rd Earl of Burlington, 5th Baron Clifford	William Cavendish (1698–1755); 3rd Duke of Devonshire and Marquess of Hartington, 6th Earl of Devonshire
Earldom of Burlington (1st creation) extinct, 1753
Hamilton Boyle (1729–1764); 6th Earl of Cork, Earl of Orrery, and Viscount Dungarvan	Edmund Boyle (1707–1762); 7th Earl of Cork, Earl of Orrery, and Viscount Dungarvan	Charlotte Elizabeth Boyle (1731–1754); 6th Baroness Clifford	William Cavendish (1720–1764); 4th Duke of Devonshire and Marquess of Hartington, 7th Earl of Devonshire
Earl of Burlington (2nd creation) and Baron Cavendish of Keighley, in the county of York, 1831
Edmund Boyle (1767–1856); 8th Earl of Cork, Earl of Orrery, and Viscount Dungarvan	William Cavendish (1748–1811); 5th Duke of Devonshire and Marquess of Hartington, 8th Earl of Devonshire, 7th Baron Clifford	George Augustus Henry Cavendish (1754–1834); 1st Earl of Burlington and Baron Cavendish of Keighley
Charles Boyle (1800–1834) styled Viscount Dungarvan	John Boyle (1803–1874)	Georgiana Dorothy Cavendish (1783–1858)	William George Spencer Cavendish 🍌 (1790–1858); 6th Duke of Devonshire and Marquess of Hartington, 9th Earl of Devonshire, 8th Baron Clifford	William Cavendish (1783–1812)
Barony Clifford abeyant, 1812
Blanche Howard (1812–1840)	William Cavendish (1808–1891); 7th Duke of Devonshire and Marquess of Hartington, 10th Earl of Devonshire, 2nd Earl of Burlington and Baron Cavendish of Keighley
Richard Edmund St Lawrence Boyle (1829–1904); 9th Earl of Cork, Earl of Orrery, and Viscount Dungarvan	Gerald Edmund Boyle	Spencer Compton Cavendish (1833–1908); 8th Duke of Devonshire and Marquess of Hartington, 11th Earl of Devonshire, 3rd Earl of Burlington and Baron Cavendish of Keighley	Edward Cavendish (1838–1891)
Charles Spencer Canning Boyle (1861–1925); 10th Earl of Cork, Earl of Orrery, and Viscount Dungarvan	Robert John Lascelles Boyle (1864–1934); 11th Earl of Cork, Earl of Orrery, and Viscount Dungarvan	William Henry Dudley "Ginger" Boyle (1873–1967); 12th Earl of Cork, Earl of Orrery, and Viscount Dungarvan	Victor Christian William Cavendish (1868–1938); 9th Duke of Devonshire and Marquess of Hartington, 12th Earl of Devonshire, 4th Earl of Burlington and Baron Cavendish of Keighley
Edward William Spencer Cavendish (1895–1950); 10th Duke of Devonshire and Marquess of Hartington, 13th Earl of Devonshire, 5th Earl of Burlington and Baron Cavendish of Keighley	Dorothy Evelyn Cavendish (1900–1966)	Harold Macmillan (1894–1986)
Patrick Reginald Boyle (1910–1995); 13th Earl of Cork, Earl of Orrery, and Viscount Dungarvan	John William Boyle (1916–2003); 14th Earl of Cork, Earl of Orrery, and Viscount Dungarvan	William John Robert Cavendish (1917–1944) styled Marquess of Hartington	Kathleen Kennedy (1920–1948)	Andrew Robert Buxton Cavendish (1920–2004); 11th Duke of Devonshire and Marquess of Hartington, 14th Earl of Devonshire, 6th Earl of Burlington and Baron Cavendish of Keighley
John Richard Boyle (b. 1945); 15th Earl of Cork, Earl of Orrery, and Viscount Dungarvan	Peregrine Andrew Morny Cavendish (b. 1944); 12th Duke of Devonshire and Marquess of Hartington, 15th Earl of Devonshire, 7th Earl of Burlington and Baron Cavendish of Keighley
Rory Jonathan Courtenay Boyle (b. 1978) styled Viscount Dungarvan	William Cavendish (b. 1969) styled Earl of Burlington
Heir apparent to the Earldoms of Cork and Orrery	Heir apparent to the Dukedom of Devonshire

== See also ==
- Duke of Devonshire
- Earl of Cumberland
- Earl of Cork
- Earl of Burlington
