= Earl of Burlington =

Earldom in the Peerage of the United Kingdom

Earldom of Burlington
- Sable, three bucks' heads caboshed, argent (Cavendish arms)
- Creation date: 10 September 1831
- Creation: Second
- Created by: William IV
- Peerage: Peerage of the United Kingdom
- First holder: Lord George Cavendish
- Present holder: Peregrine Cavendish, 12th Duke of Devonshire and 7th Earl of Burlington (as a subsidiary title)
- Heir apparent: William Cavendish, Earl of Burlington (as a courtesy title)
- Remainder to: Heirs male of the first earl's body lawfully begotten
- Subsidiary titles: Baron Cavendish
- Motto: Cavendo tutus ("Secure by caution")

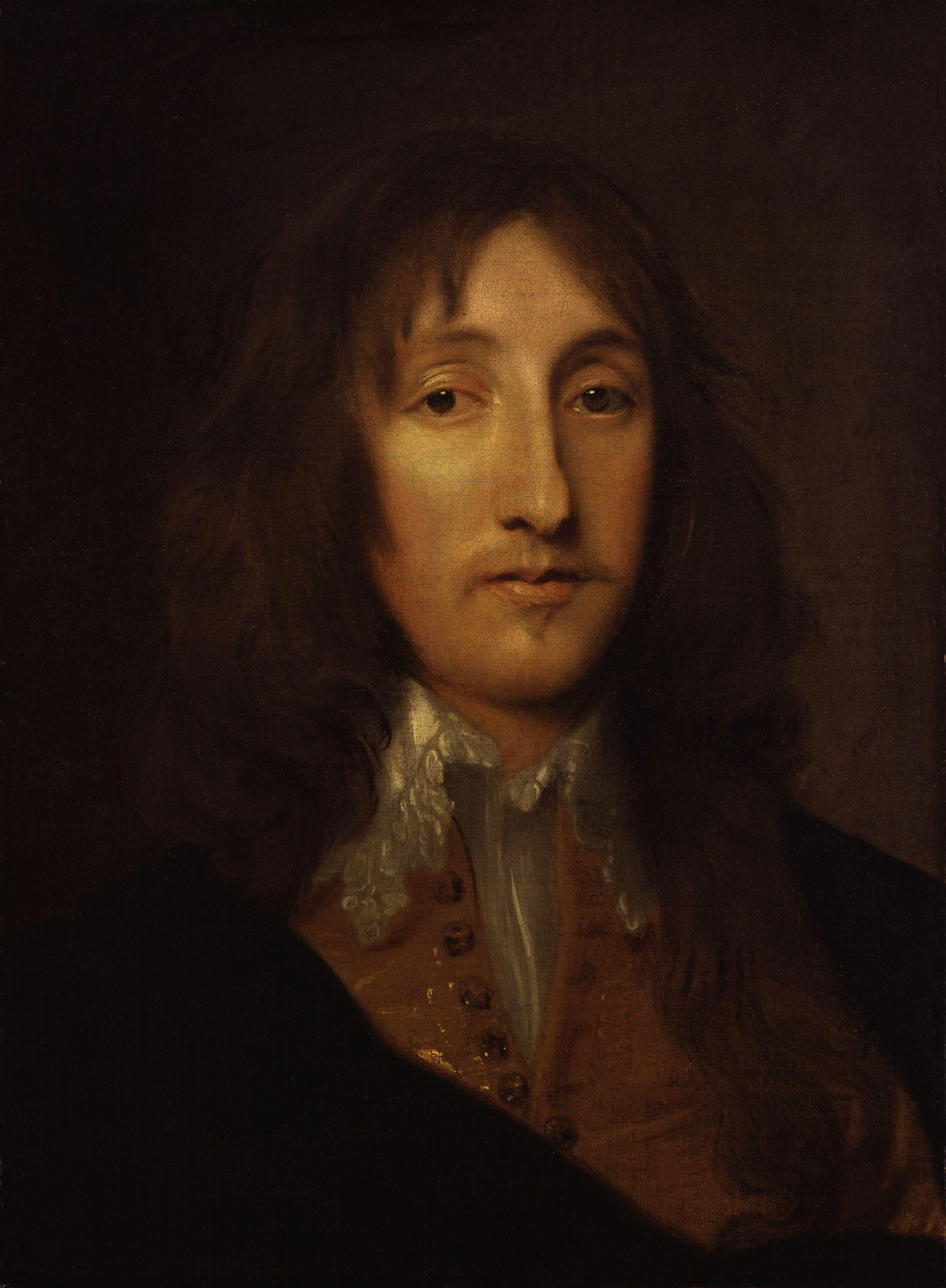
Richard Boyle, 1st Earl of Burlington of the first creation

Earl of Burlington is a title that has been created twice, the first time in the Peerage of England in 1664 and the second in the Peerage of the United Kingdom in 1831. Since 1858, Earl of Burlington has been a courtesy title used by the dukes of Devonshire, traditionally borne by the duke's grandson, who is the eldest son of the duke's eldest son, known by courtesy as marquess of Hartington.

== History ==
The first creation was for Richard Boyle, 2nd Earl of Cork, on 20 March 1664 (see the Earl of Cork for earlier history of the family). He had previously been created Baron Clifford of Londesborough , in the County of York, on 4 November 1644, also in the Peerage of England. Lord Burlington was the husband of Elizabeth Clifford, 2nd Baroness Clifford. Their eldest son Charles Boyle, Viscount Dungarvan, succeeded his mother as third Baron Clifford in 1691 but predeceased his father. Lord Burlington was therefore succeeded by his grandson (the son of Viscount Dungarvan), the third Earl of Cork and second Earl of Burlington. He had already succeeded his father as fourth Baron Clifford in 1694. His only son, the 3rd Earl of Burlington and 4th Earl of Cork, was the famous architect and patron. He had two daughters but no sons and on his death in 1753 the barony of Clifford of Lanesborough and earldom of Burlington became extinct. He was succeeded in the earldom of Cork by his third cousin, the fifth Earl of Orrery (see the Earl of Cork for further history of these titles).

Lord Burlington was succeeded in his Burlington estates and in the barony of Clifford (which could be passed on through female lines) by his daughter Charlotte, the sixth baroness. She was the wife of the 4th duke of Devonshire. On 10 September 1831, the earldom of Burlington was revived when their third and youngest son Lord George Cavendish was created Baron Cavendish of Keighley, in the County of York, and Earl of Burlington, in the Peerage of the United Kingdom. In 1858, his grandson, the second Earl, succeeded his first cousin once removed as seventh Duke of Devonshire. Since then, Earl of Burlington has traditionally been used as a courtesy title by the Duke of Devonshire's grandson (Marquess of Hartington is the title used by the heir apparent). Bill Burlington has opted to remain known as Earl of Burlington instead of Marquess of Hartington as he could have done following the death of his grandfather in 2004.

== Earls of Burlington; First creation (1664) ==
- Richard Boyle, 1st Earl of Burlington, 2nd Earl of Cork (1612–1698)
- Charles Boyle, 2nd Earl of Burlington, 3rd Earl of Cork (1660–1704)
- Richard Boyle, 3rd Earl of Burlington, 4th Earl of Cork (1694–1753)

== Earls of Burlington; Second creation (1831) ==
- George Augustus Henry Cavendish, 1st Earl of Burlington (1754–1834)
  - William Cavendish (1783–1812)
- William Cavendish, 2nd Earl of Burlington (1808–1891) (succeeded as Duke of Devonshire in 1858)

See Duke of Devonshire for further succession.

== Family tree ==
Boyle and Cavendish family tree including: Dukes of Devonshire, Marquesses of Hartington, Earls of Burlington, Earls of Cork, Earls of Devonshire, and Earls of Orrery

William Cavendish c. 1505–1557	Bess of Hardwick c. 1527–1608
Baron Boyle of Youghal, 1616; Earl of Cork and Viscount Dungarvan, 1620	Earl of Devonshire (1st creation), 1603	Baron Cavendish, of Hardwicke in the County of Derby, 1605; Earl of Devonshire (2nd creation), 1618
Richard Boyle; 1566–1643; 1st Earl of Cork, etc.	Charles Blount; 1563–1606; Earl of Devonshire, 8th Baron Mountjoy	William Cavendish; 1552–1626; 1st Earl of Devonshire, etc.	Charles Cavendish; 1553–1617
Earldom of Devonshire (1st creation) extinct, 1606
William Cavendish; 1591–1628; 2nd Earl of Devonshire, etc.	Dukes of Newcastle (1st creation)
Baron Clifford of Londesborough, 1644; Earl of Burlington (1st creation), 1664	Earl of Orrery, 1660
Richard Boyle; 1612–1698; 2nd Earl of Cork, etc., 1st Earl of Burlington, etc.	Elizabeth Clifford; 1613–1691; 2nd Baroness Clifford suo jure	Roger Boyle; 1621–1679; 1st Earl of Orrery	William Cavendish; 1617–1684; 3rd Earl of Devonshire, etc.
Duke of Devonshire and Marquess of Hartington, 1694
Charles Boyle; 1639–1694 styled Viscount Dungarvan, 3rd Baron Clifford	Roger Boyle; 1646–1682; 2nd Earl of Orrery	William Cavendish; 1640–1707; 1st Duke of Devonshire, etc., 4th Earl of Devonshire, etc.
Charles Boyle d. 1704; 3rd Earl of Cork, etc., 2nd Earl of Burlington, 4th Baron Clifford	Lionel Boyle; 1671–1703; 3rd Earl of Orrery	Charles Boyle; 1674–1731; 4th Earl of Orrery	William Cavendish; 1672–1729; 2nd Duke of Devonshire, etc., 5th Earl of Devonshire
John Boyle; 1707–1762; 5th Earl of Cork, etc.	Richard Boyle; 1694–1753; 4th Earl of Cork, 3rd Earl of Burlington, 5th Baron Clifford	William Cavendish; 1698–1755; 3rd Duke of Devonshire, etc., 6th Earl of Devonshire
Earldom of Burlington (1st creation) extinct, 1753
Hamilton Boyle; 1729–1764; 6th Earl of Cork, etc.	Edmund Boyle; 1707–1762; 7th Earl of Cork, etc.	Charlotte Elizabeth Boyle; 1731–1754; 6th Baroness Clifford	William Cavendish; 1720–1764; 4th Duke of Devonshire, etc., 7th Earl of Devonshire
Earl of Burlington (2nd creation) and Baron Cavendish of Keighley, in the county of York, 1831
Edmund Boyle; 1767–1856; 8th Earl of Cork, etc.	William Cavendish; 1748–1811; 5th Duke of Devonshire, etc., 8th Earl of Devonshire, 7th Baron Clifford	George Augustus Henry Cavendish; 1754–1834; 1st Earl of Burlington, Baron Cavendish of Keighley
Charles Boyle; 1800–1834 styled Viscount Dungarvan	John Boyle 1803–1874	Georgiana Dorothy Cavendish; 1783–1858	William George Spencer Cavendish 🍌 1790–1858; 6th Duke of Devonshire, etc., 9th Earl of Devonshire, 8th Baron Clifford	William Cavendish; 1783–1812
Barony Clifford abeyant, 1812
Blanche Howard; 1812–1840	William Cavendish; 1808–1891; 7th Duke of Devonshire, etc., 10th Earl of Devonshire, 2nd Earl of Burlington, Baron Cavendish of Keighley
Richard Edmund St Lawrence Boyle; 1829–1904; 9th Earl of Cork, etc.	Gerald Edmund Boyle	Spencer Compton Cavendish; 1833–1908; 8th Duke of Devonshire, etc., 11th Earl of Devonshire, 3rd Earl of Burlington, Baron Cavendish of Keighley	Edward Cavendish; 1838–1891
Charles Spencer Canning Boyle; 1861–1925; 10th Earl of Cork, etc.	Robert John Lascelles Boyle; 1864–1934; 11th Earl of Cork, etc.	William Henry Dudley "Ginger" Boyle; 1873–1967; 12th Earl of Cork, etc.	Victor Christian William Cavendish; 1868–1938; 9th Duke of Devonshire, etc., 12th Earl of Devonshire, 4th Earl of Burlington, Baron Cavendish of Keighley
Edward William Spencer Cavendish; 1895–1950; 10th Duke of Devonshire, etc., 13th Earl of Devonshire, 5th Earl of Burlington, Baron Cavendish of Keighley	Dorothy Evelyn Cavendish; 1900–1966	Harold Macmillan; 1894–1986
Patrick Reginald Boyle; 1910–1995; 13th Earl of Cork, etc.	John William Boyle; 1916–2003; 14th Earl of Cork, etc.	William John Robert Cavendish; 1917–1944 styled Marquess of Hartington	Kathleen Kennedy; 1920–1948	Andrew Robert Buxton Cavendish; 1920–2004; 11th Duke of Devonshire, etc., 14th Earl of Devonshire, 6th Earl of Burlington, Baron Cavendish of Keighley
John Richard Boyle b. 1945; 15th Earl of Cork, etc.	Peregrine Andrew Morny Cavendish b. 1944; 12th Duke of Devonshire, etc., 15th Earl of Devonshire, 7th Earl of Burlington, Baron Cavendish of Keighley
Rory Jonathan Courtenay Boyle b. 1978 styled Viscount Dungarvan	William Cavendish b. 1969 styled Earl of Burlington
Heir apparent to the Earldoms of Cork and Orrery	Heir apparent to the Dukedom of Devonshire

== See also ==
- Cavendish family
- Earl of Cork
- Baron Clifford
- Burlington Estate
