= Baron Carleton =

Barony in the Peerage of Great Britain

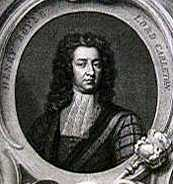
Henry Carleton, 1st Baron Carleton

Baron Carleton is a title that has been created three times in British history, once in the Peerage of Ireland and twice in the Peerage of Great Britain. The first creation came in the Peerage of England in 1626 when Sir Dudley Carleton was made Baron Carleton, of Imbercourt in the County of Surrey. He was made Viscount Dorchester two years later. See the article on him for more information on this creation. Dudley Carleton was the first cousin of Sir John Carleton, 1st Baronet (see Carleton baronets).

The second creation came in the Peerage of Great Britain in 1714 when Henry Boyle was made Baron Carleton, of Carleton in the County of York. He was the son of Charles Boyle, 3rd Viscount Dungarvan and the brother of Charles Boyle, 2nd Earl of Burlington (see Earl of Cork for earlier history of the family). The title became extinct upon his death in 1725.

The third creation came in the Peerage of Great Britain in 1786 when Richard Boyle, 2nd Earl of Shannon was made Baron Carleton, of Carleton in the County of York, which entitled him to a seat in the House of Lords. Lord Shannon was the first cousin of the first holder of the 1714 creation (through his mother Lady Henrietta Boyle, sister of Charles Boyle, 3rd Viscount Dungarvan), as well as a third cousin on his father's side. The barony and earldom have remained united since. See Earl of Shannon for further history of the titles.

== Baron Carleton; First creation (1626) ==
- Dudley Carleton, 1st Baron Carleton (1573–1632) (created Viscount Dorchester in 1628)

== Baron Carleton; Second creation (1714) ==
- Henry Boyle, 1st Baron Carleton (1669–1725)

== Baron Carleton; Third creation (1786) ==
- Richard Boyle, 2nd Earl of Shannon, 1st Baron Carleton (1728–1815) (see Earl of Shannon)
