= Joan Boyle =

Joan Boyle may refer to:

- Joan Naylor (1529–1586), mother of Richard Boyle
- Joan Apsley (1578–1599), first wife of Richard Boyle
- Lady Joan Boyle (1611–1657), fourth daughter of Richard Boyle, 1st Earl of Cork
