= Custos Rotulorum of County Waterford =

Formerly the highest civil officer in County Waterford, Ireland

The Custos Rotulorum of County Waterford was the highest civil officer in County Waterford, Ireland. The position was later combined with that of Lord Lieutenant of Waterford.

== Incumbents ==
- 1642–c.1643 Richard Boyle, 1st Earl of Cork (died 1643)
- 1660–c.1698 Richard Boyle, 1st Earl of Burlington (also Custos Rotulorum of County Cork) (died 1698)
- 1769–1800 George Beresford, 1st Marquess of Waterford
- c.1800–c.1826 Henry Beresford, 2nd Marquess of Waterford
- 1826–1839 George Thomas Beresford

For later custodes rotulorum, see Lord Lieutenant of Waterford
