= Earl of Cork =

Title in the peerage of Ireland

Earldom of Cork held with Earldom of Orrery
- Arms of Boyle: Per bend embattled argent and gules
- Creation date: 26 October 1620
- Creation: Second
- Created by: James I
- Peerage: Peerage of Ireland
- First holder: Richard Boyle, 1st Earl of Cork
- Present holder: John Boyle, 15th Earl of Cork
- Heir apparent: Rory Boyle, Viscount Dungarvan
- Remainder to: Heirs male of the first earl's body lawfully begotten
- Subsidiary titles: Viscount Dungarvan; Lord Boyle, Baron of Youghal
- Seat: Lickfold House
- Former seats: Lismore Castle; Marston Bigot Park
- Motto: "God's providence is mine inheritance"

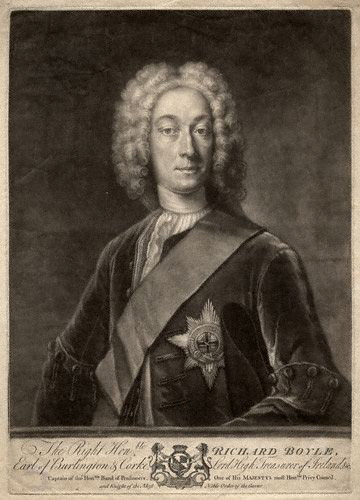
Richard Boyle, 3rd Earl of Burlington and 4th Earl of Cork

Earl of Cork is a title in the Peerage of Ireland, held in conjunction with the Earldom of Orrery since 1753. It was created in 1620 for Richard Boyle, 1st Baron Boyle. He had already been created Lord Boyle, Baron of Youghal, in the County of Cork, in 1616, and was made Viscount of Dungarvan, in the County of Waterford, at the same time he was given the earldom. These titles are also in the Peerage of Ireland.

Known as the "Great Earl", Richard Boyle was born in Canterbury, England, but settled in Ireland in 1588, where he married an Irish heiress and bought large estates in County Cork. From 1631 to 1643 he served as Lord Treasurer of Ireland. His third son, the Hon. Sir Roger Boyle was created Earl of Orrery in 1660. The first Earl of Cork was remarkable for having four of his sons created peers; his remaining son was Robert Boyle, the scientist, discoverer of Boyle's law.

Lord Cork was succeeded by his second son, another Richard Boyle, the second Earl; his eldest son died young. This Richard Boyle had already succeeded his younger brother as second Viscount Boyle of Kinalmeaky according to a special remainder in the letters patent. He married Elizabeth Clifford, 2nd Baroness Clifford, and in 1644 he was created Baron Clifford of Lanesborough, in the County of York, in the Peerage of England. Lord Cork later served as Lord High Treasurer of Ireland and as Lord Lieutenant of the West Riding of Yorkshire. In 1664 he was further honoured when he was made Earl of Burlington in the Peerage of England. His only son and heir apparent Charles Boyle, Viscount Dungarvan, was summoned to the Irish House of Lords through a writ of acceleration in his father's junior title of Viscount Dungarvan in 1663. He later represented Tamworth and Yorkshire in the English House of Commons. In 1689 he was summoned to the English House of Lords through a writ of acceleration in his father's junior title of Baron Clifford of Lanesborough.

Lord Cork was succeeded by his grandson, the third Earl, the son of Viscount Dungarvan. He was Lord Treasurer of Ireland and Lord Lieutenant of the West Riding of Yorkshire. On his death the titles passed to his only son, the fourth Earl of Cork and third Earl of Burlington. Known as Lord Burlington, he was the famous architect who published Andrea Palladio's designs of Ancient Roman architecture and designed Chiswick House with William Kent. He had no sons and on his death in 1753 the barony of Clifford of Lanesborough and earldom of Burlington became extinct. He was succeeded in the Burlington estates and in the barony of Clifford by his eldest surviving daughter Charlotte Elizabeth Boyle, 6th Baroness Clifford (see the Baron Clifford for later history of this title). She married William Cavendish, 4th Duke of Devonshire. Their third son Lord George Augustus Henry Cavendish was created Earl of Burlington (second creation) in 1831.

Lord Burlington was succeeded in the earldom of Cork and the other remaining titles by his third cousin John Boyle, 5th Earl of Orrery, who became the fifth Earl of Cork as well. He was descended from the third son of the first Earl of Cork, and had also inherited the titles of Baron Broghill [Ireland] and Baron Boyle of Marston in the Peerage of Great Britain; he thus held a seat in the British House of Lords until 1999 (see the Earl of Orrery for earlier history of this branch of the family). John Boyle was a writer and a friend of Jonathan Swift, Alexander Pope and Samuel Johnson.

He was succeeded by his second but eldest surviving son, the sixth Earl. He represented Charleville in the Irish House of Commons and Warwick in the British House of Commons. He died unmarried at the age of thirty-three and was succeeded by his half-brother, Edmund Boyle, 7th Earl of Cork. The seventh Earl is remembered for the fame of his second wife Mary Boyle, Countess of Cork and Orrery, the celebrated Lady Cork whose salon was a centre of intellectual life for fifty years. On his death in 1798 the titles passed to his second but eldest surviving son, the eighth Earl. He was a General in the Army and fought in the Revolutionary and Napoleonic Wars.

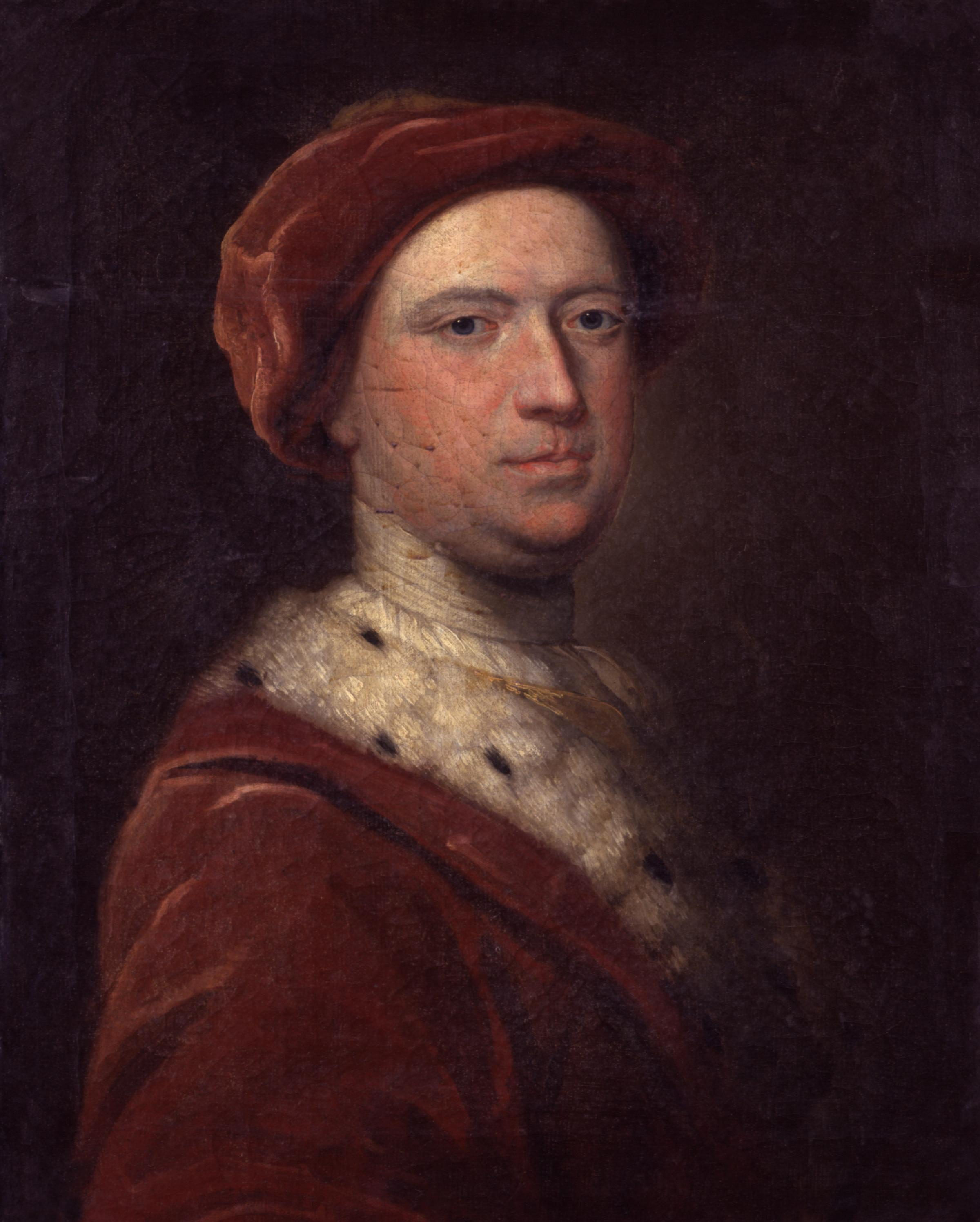
John Boyle, 5th Earl of Cork.

He was succeeded by his grandson, the ninth Earl. He was the son of Captain Charles Boyle, Viscount Dungarvan. Lord Cork was a Liberal politician and served as Master of the Buckhounds and as Master of the Horse under Lord Russell, William Ewart Gladstone and Lord Rosebery. His eldest son, the tenth Earl, fought in the Second Boer War but died childless in 1925. He was succeeded by his younger brother, the eleventh Earl.

He also died childless and was succeeded by his second cousin, William Boyle, 12th Earl of Cork and Orrery. He was the grandson of the Hon. John Boyle, third son of the eighth Earl. Lord Cork was an Admiral of the Fleet and notably commanded the combined expedition for the capture of Narvik in 1940. He was childless and was succeeded by his nephew, the thirteenth Earl.

He was the eldest son of Major the Hon. Reginald Courtenay Boyle. He served as a Deputy Speaker of the House of Lords and as Deputy Chairman of Committees in the House of Lords from 1973 to 1978. He died childless and was succeeded by his younger brother, the fourteenth Earl. As of 2017, the titles are held by the latter's eldest son, the fifteenth Earl, who succeeded in 2003.

The family seat is Lickfold House, near Petworth, West Sussex.

== Earl of Cork (1394?) ==
Edward of Norwich, Earl of Rutland, the first son of Edmund of Langley, 1st Duke of York, fifth son of Edward III of England, favorite of his cousin Richard II, had been created Earl of Cork in the Peerage of Ireland during his nephew's personal reign. While the creation is unrecorded, he campaigned in Ireland from 1394 to 1395, and both he and King Richard use the title in letters that spring.

He is usually called by some other of his many titles; Rutland, Aumale, or York. He was created Duke of Aumale in 1397, and deprived of the dukedom 6 October 1399, as a consequence of the deposition of Richard II; he succeeded his father as Duke of York in 1402. This Earldom, and all honours created for him, became extinct when he died childless at the battle of Agincourt in 1415.

== Earls of Cork (1620) ==
Heirs who did not live to succeed to the Earldom are indented.

- Richard Boyle, 1st Earl of Cork (1566–1643)
  - Roger Boyle (1606–1615)
- Richard Boyle, 1st Earl of Burlington and 2nd Earl of Cork (1612–1698)
  - Charles Boyle, 3rd Viscount Dungarvan (1639–1694)
- Charles Boyle, 2nd Earl of Burlington and 3rd Earl of Cork (bef. 1674–1703)
- Richard Boyle, 3rd Earl of Burlington and 4th Earl of Cork (1694–1753)
- John Boyle, 5th Earl of Cork and 5th Earl of Orrery (1707–1762)
  - Charles Boyle, Viscount Dungarvan (1729–1759)
- Hamilton Boyle, 6th Earl of Cork and 6th Earl of Orrery (1729–1764)
- Edmund Boyle, 7th Earl of Cork and 7th Earl of Orrery (1742–1798)
  - John Richard Boyle, Viscount Dungarvan (1765–1768)
- Edmund Boyle, 8th Earl of Cork and 8th Earl of Orrery (1767–1856)
  - Edmund William Boyle, Viscount Dungarvan (1798–1826)
  - Charles Boyle, Viscount Dungarvan (1800–1834)
- Richard Edmund St Lawrence Boyle, 9th Earl of Cork and 9th Earl of Orrery (1829–1904)
- Charles Spencer Canning Boyle, 10th Earl of Cork and 10th Earl of Orrery (1861–1925)
- Robert John Lascelles Boyle, 11th Earl of Cork and 11th Earl of Orrery (1864–1934)
- William Henry Dudley Boyle, 12th Earl of Cork and 12th Earl of Orrery (1873–1967)
- Patrick Reginald Boyle, 13th Earl of Cork and 13th Earl of Orrery (1910–1995)
- John William Boyle, 14th Earl of Cork and 14th Earl of Orrery (1916–2003)
- John Richard Boyle, 15th Earl of Cork and 15th Earl of Orrery (born 1945)

The heir apparent is the present holder's son Rory Jonathan Courtenay Boyle, Viscount Dungarvan (born 1978).

== Family tree and line of succession ==
Boyle and Cavendish family tree including: Dukes of Devonshire, Marquesses of Hartington, Earls of Burlington, Earls of Cork, Earls of Devonshire, and Earls of Orrery

William Cavendish c. 1505–1557	Bess of Hardwick c. 1527–1608
Baron Boyle of Youghal, 1616; Earl of Cork and Viscount Dungarvan, 1620	Earl of Devonshire (1st creation), 1603	Baron Cavendish, of Hardwicke in the County of Derby, 1605; Earl of Devonshire (2nd creation), 1618
Richard Boyle; 1566–1643; 1st Earl of Cork, etc.	Charles Blount; 1563–1606; Earl of Devonshire, 8th Baron Mountjoy	William Cavendish; 1552–1626; 1st Earl of Devonshire, etc.	Charles Cavendish; 1553–1617
Earldom of Devonshire (1st creation) extinct, 1606
William Cavendish; 1591–1628; 2nd Earl of Devonshire, etc.	Dukes of Newcastle (1st creation)
Baron Clifford of Londesborough, 1644; Earl of Burlington (1st creation), 1664	Earl of Orrery, 1660
Richard Boyle; 1612–1698; 2nd Earl of Cork, etc., 1st Earl of Burlington, etc.	Elizabeth Clifford; 1613–1691; 2nd Baroness Clifford suo jure	Roger Boyle; 1621–1679; 1st Earl of Orrery	William Cavendish; 1617–1684; 3rd Earl of Devonshire, etc.
Duke of Devonshire and Marquess of Hartington, 1694
Charles Boyle; 1639–1694 styled Viscount Dungarvan, 3rd Baron Clifford	Roger Boyle; 1646–1682; 2nd Earl of Orrery	William Cavendish; 1640–1707; 1st Duke of Devonshire, etc., 4th Earl of Devonshire, etc.
Charles Boyle d. 1704; 3rd Earl of Cork, etc., 2nd Earl of Burlington, 4th Baron Clifford	Lionel Boyle; 1671–1703; 3rd Earl of Orrery	Charles Boyle; 1674–1731; 4th Earl of Orrery	William Cavendish; 1672–1729; 2nd Duke of Devonshire, etc., 5th Earl of Devonshire
John Boyle; 1707–1762; 5th Earl of Cork, etc.	Richard Boyle; 1694–1753; 4th Earl of Cork, 3rd Earl of Burlington, 5th Baron Clifford	William Cavendish; 1698–1755; 3rd Duke of Devonshire, etc., 6th Earl of Devonshire
Earldom of Burlington (1st creation) extinct, 1753
Hamilton Boyle; 1729–1764; 6th Earl of Cork, etc.	Edmund Boyle; 1707–1762; 7th Earl of Cork, etc.	Charlotte Elizabeth Boyle; 1731–1754; 6th Baroness Clifford	William Cavendish; 1720–1764; 4th Duke of Devonshire, etc., 7th Earl of Devonshire
Earl of Burlington (2nd creation) and Baron Cavendish of Keighley, in the county of York, 1831
Edmund Boyle; 1767–1856; 8th Earl of Cork, etc.	William Cavendish; 1748–1811; 5th Duke of Devonshire, etc., 8th Earl of Devonshire, 7th Baron Clifford	George Augustus Henry Cavendish; 1754–1834; 1st Earl of Burlington, Baron Cavendish of Keighley
Charles Boyle; 1800–1834 styled Viscount Dungarvan	John Boyle 1803–1874	Georgiana Dorothy Cavendish; 1783–1858	William George Spencer Cavendish 🍌 1790–1858; 6th Duke of Devonshire, etc., 9th Earl of Devonshire, 8th Baron Clifford	William Cavendish; 1783–1812
Barony Clifford abeyant, 1812
Blanche Howard; 1812–1840	William Cavendish; 1808–1891; 7th Duke of Devonshire, etc., 10th Earl of Devonshire, 2nd Earl of Burlington, Baron Cavendish of Keighley
Richard Edmund St Lawrence Boyle; 1829–1904; 9th Earl of Cork, etc.	Gerald Edmund Boyle	Spencer Compton Cavendish; 1833–1908; 8th Duke of Devonshire, etc., 11th Earl of Devonshire, 3rd Earl of Burlington, Baron Cavendish of Keighley	Edward Cavendish; 1838–1891
Charles Spencer Canning Boyle; 1861–1925; 10th Earl of Cork, etc.	Robert John Lascelles Boyle; 1864–1934; 11th Earl of Cork, etc.	William Henry Dudley "Ginger" Boyle; 1873–1967; 12th Earl of Cork, etc.	Victor Christian William Cavendish; 1868–1938; 9th Duke of Devonshire, etc., 12th Earl of Devonshire, 4th Earl of Burlington, Baron Cavendish of Keighley
Edward William Spencer Cavendish; 1895–1950; 10th Duke of Devonshire, etc., 13th Earl of Devonshire, 5th Earl of Burlington, Baron Cavendish of Keighley	Dorothy Evelyn Cavendish; 1900–1966	Harold Macmillan; 1894–1986
Patrick Reginald Boyle; 1910–1995; 13th Earl of Cork, etc.	John William Boyle; 1916–2003; 14th Earl of Cork, etc.	William John Robert Cavendish; 1917–1944 styled Marquess of Hartington	Kathleen Kennedy; 1920–1948	Andrew Robert Buxton Cavendish; 1920–2004; 11th Duke of Devonshire, etc., 14th Earl of Devonshire, 6th Earl of Burlington, Baron Cavendish of Keighley
John Richard Boyle b. 1945; 15th Earl of Cork, etc.	Peregrine Andrew Morny Cavendish b. 1944; 12th Duke of Devonshire, etc., 15th Earl of Devonshire, 7th Earl of Burlington, Baron Cavendish of Keighley
Rory Jonathan Courtenay Boyle b. 1978 styled Viscount Dungarvan	William Cavendish b. 1969 styled Earl of Burlington
Heir apparent to the Earldoms of Cork and Orrery	Heir apparent to the Dukedom of Devonshire

Line of succession
- Richard Boyle, 1st Earl of Cork (1566–1643)
  - Roger Boyle, 1st Earl of Orrery (1621–1679)
    - Roger Boyle, 2nd Earl of Orrery (1646–1682)
      - Charles Boyle, 4th Earl of Orrery (1674–1731)
        - John Boyle, 5th Earl of Cork and Orrery (1707–1762)
          - Edmund Boyle, 7th Earl of Cork and Orrery (1742–1798)
            - Edmund Boyle, 8th Earl of Cork and Orrery (1767–1856)
              - Hon. John Boyle (1803–1874)
                - Gerald Edmund Boyle (1840–1927)
                  - Hon. Reginald Courtenay Boyle (1877–1946)
                    - John Boyle, 14th Earl of Cork and Orrery (1916–2003)
                      - John Boyle, 15th Earl of Cork and Orrery (b. 1945)
                        - (1). Rory Jonathan Courtenay Boyle, Viscount Dungarvan (b. 1978)
                      - (2). Hon. Robert William Boyle (b. 1948)
                        - (3). Richard Piers Boyle (b. 1988)
                          - (4). Jasper William Ally Boyle (b. 2026)
                      - (5). Hon. Charles Reginald Boyle (b. 1957)
                        - (6). John Arthur Hoene Boyle (b. 1994)
              - Rev. Hon. Richard Cavendish Boyle (1812–1886)
                - Charles John Boyle (1849–1922)
                  - Edmund Michael Gordon Leventhorpe Boyle (1895–1982)
                    - George Hamilton Boyle (1928–2007)
                      - male issue and descendants in remainder
            - Hon. Courtenay Boyle (1770–1844)
              - Charles John Boyle (1806–1885)
                - Lionel Richard Cavendish Boyle (1851–1920)
                  - Richard Courtenay Boyle (1902–1986)
                    - male issue and descendants in remainder
    - Hon. Henry Boyle (1648–1693)
      - Henry Boyle, 1st Earl of Shannon (1682–1764)
        - Earls of Shannon

== See also ==
- Viscount Boyle of Kinalmeaky
- Earl of Orrery
- Earl of Shannon
- Viscount Shannon
- Baron Carleton (1714 creation)
- Earl of Burlington
- Viscount Blesington
