= Richard Boyle (MP, died 1665) =

Irish politician (died 1665)

Richard Boyle, FRS (died 3 June 1665) was an Irish politician who was Member of Parliament for County Cork from 1661 until his death in action.

Boyle was the son of Richard Boyle, 2nd Earl of Cork and brother of Charles Boyle, 3rd Viscount Dungarvan. He was educated at Christ Church, Oxford.

He was elected an Original Fellow of the Royal Society in 1663. A naval volunteer during the Second Anglo-Dutch War, Boyle was killed in action in Southwold Bay at the Battle of Lowestoft.
