= Richard Boyle, 3rd Earl of Burlington =

British architect and politician

The Right Honourable The Earl of Burlington KG PC
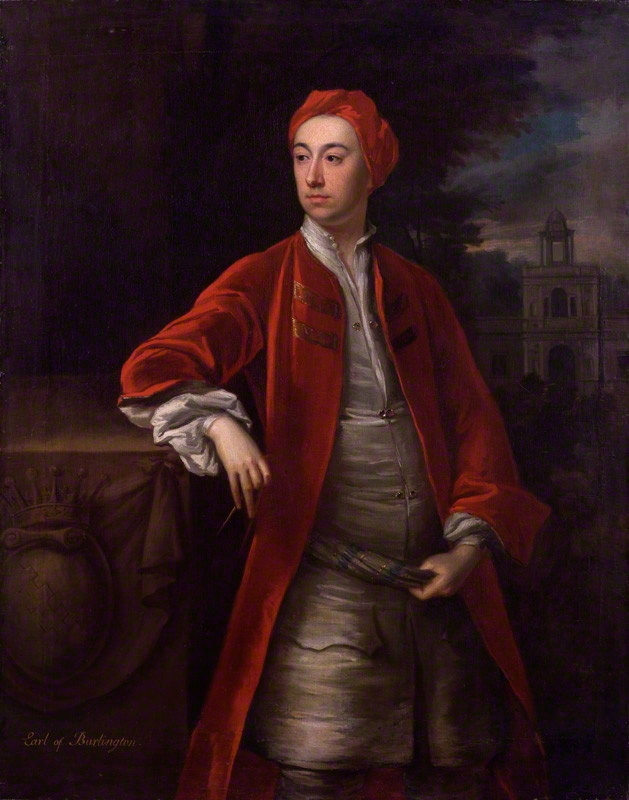
- Portrait by Jonathan Richardson, c. 1718

Lord High Treasurer of Ireland
- In office 25 August 1715 – 3 December 1753
- Preceded by: The Lord Carleton
- Succeeded by: Marquess of Hartington

Personal details
- Born: 25 April 1694 Yorkshire, England
- Died: 4 December 1753 (aged 59) Chiswick House, London
- Spouse: Lady Dorothy Savile
- Children: Dorothy FitzRoy, Countess of Euston; Lady Julianna Boyle; Charlotte Cavendish, 6th Baroness Clifford
- Parents: Charles Boyle, 2nd Earl of Burlington; Juliana Noel

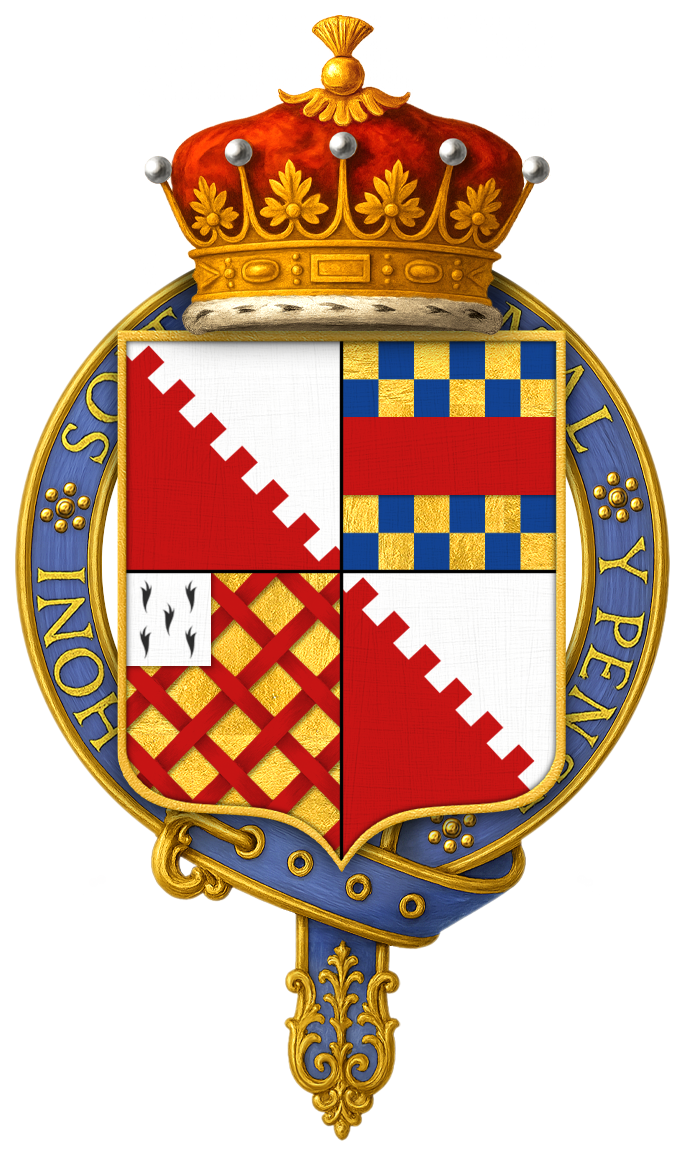
Quartered arms of Richard Boyle, 3rd Earl of Burlington, KG

Richard Boyle, 3rd Earl of Burlington (25 April 1694 – 4 December 1753) was a British architect and politician often called the "Apollo of the Arts" and the "Architect Earl". The son of the 2nd Earl of Burlington and 3rd Earl of Cork, Burlington never took more than a passing interest in politics despite his position as a Privy Counsellor and a member of both the British and Irish upper chambers.

His great interests in life were architecture and landscaping, and he is remembered for being a builder and a patron of architects, craftsmen and landscapers, Indeed, he is credited with bringing Palladian architecture to Britain and Ireland. His major projects include Burlington House, Westminster School, Chiswick House and Northwick Park.

== Life ==
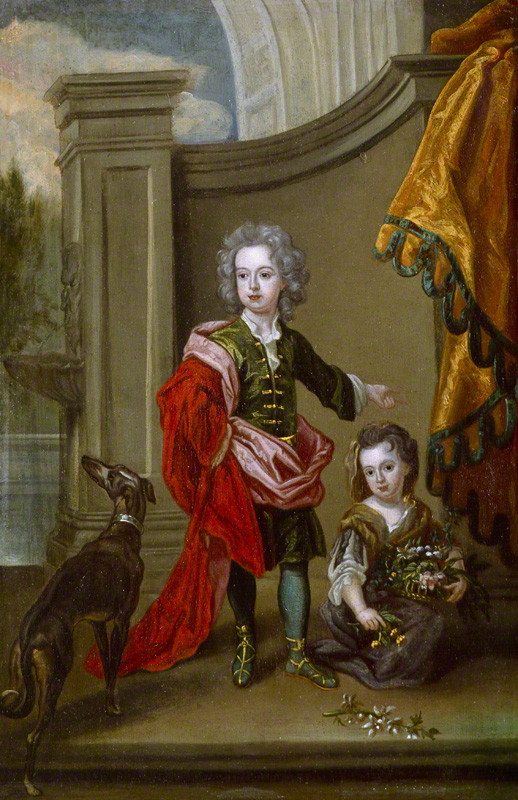
Portrait of Richard Boyle as a boy, with his sister, Lady Jane Boyle, c. 1700

Lord Burlington was born in Yorkshire into a wealthy Anglo-Irish aristocratic family, the only son and heir of Charles Boyle, 2nd Earl of Burlington by his wife Juliana Noel (1672–1750), the only daughter and heiress of the Hon. Henry Noel, the second son of Baptist Noel, 3rd Viscount Campden. He succeeded to his titles and extensive estates in Yorkshire and Ireland at the age of nine, after his father's death in February 1704. During his minority, which lasted until 1715, his English and Irish lands, as also his political interests and patronages, were managed by his mother.

Burlington showed a fondness for music at an early age. Georg Frideric Handel dedicated two operas to Burlington while staying at his residence Burlington House: Teseo and Amadigi di Gaula. According to Hawkins, Francesco Barsanti dedicated the six recorder sonatas of his Op. 1 to Lord Burlington, although the dedication must have appeared on the edition sold by Peter Bressan, before Walsh & Hare engraved the works c. 1727.

Three foreign Grand Tours taken between 1714 and 1719, and a further trip to Paris in 1726, gave him opportunities to develop his taste. His professional skill as an architect (always supported by a mason-contractor) was extraordinary in an English aristocrat. He carried his copy of Andrea Palladio's book I quattro libri dell'architettura with him when touring the Veneto in 1719, but made notes on a number of blank pages, having found the region flooded and many villas inaccessible. It was on this tour that he acquired the passion for Palladian architecture. In 1719, he was one of the main subscribers of the Royal Academy of Music, a corporation that produced baroque opera on stage.

Lord Burlington's first project, appropriately, was one of his own London residences, Burlington House, where he dismissed his baroque architect James Gibbs when he returned from the continent in 1719, and employed the Scottish architect Colen Campbell, with the history-painter-turned-designer William Kent assigned for the interiors. The courtyard front of Burlington House, prominently sited in Piccadilly, was the first major executed statement of Neo-Palladianism.

In the 1720s, Burlington and Campbell parted, and Burlington was assisted in his projects by the young Henry Flitcroft ("Burlington Harry"), who developed into a major architect of the second Neo-Palladian generation, Daniel Garrett, a straightforward Palladian architect of the second rank, and some draughtsmen.

Lord Burlington never closely inspected Roman ruins or made detailed drawings on the sites; he relied on Palladio and Scamozzi as his interpreters of the classic tradition to do so. Burlington's Palladio drawings include many reconstructions of Vitruvius' Roman buildings, which he planned to publish. In the meantime, he adapted the palazzo facade in the illustration for the London house of General Wade at Old Burlington Street in 1723, which was published for Vitruvius Britannicus iii (1725).

This publication put a previously unknown Palladio design into circulation. Another source of his inspiration were drawings he collected, some drawings of Palladio himself which had belonged to Inigo Jones, and many more of Inigo Jones' pupil John Webb, which William Kent published in 1727 (although a date of 1736 is generally accepted) as "Some Designs of Mr Inigo Jones"... with some additional designs that were by Kent and Burlington. The important role of Jones' pupil Webb in transmitting the palladian-neo-palladian heritage was not understood until the 20th century.

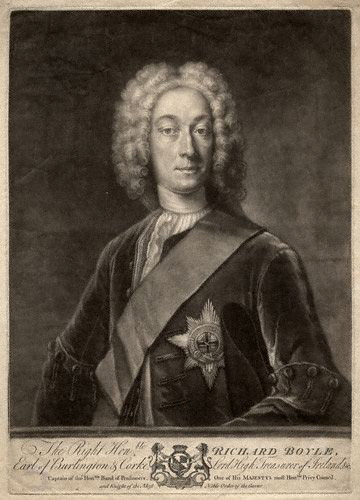
Mezzotint of Burlington

By the early 1730s, Palladian style had triumphed as the generally accepted manner for a British country house or public building. For the rest of his life, Lord Burlington was "the Apollo of the arts" as Horace Walpole phrased it— and Kent, "his proper priest."

In 1731, Alexander Pope, who had been a friend of Burlington since about 1715, addressed the first of his Moral Essays to him, on the subject Of False Taste. This described good taste in specific interests of his, such as landscaping, gardens and architecture.

Lord Burlington was a Freemason, and Chiswick House is believed by some scholars to have functioned as a private Masonic Lodge or Temple (unaffiliated to Grand Lodge), given that many of the ceiling paintings by William Kent contain iconography of a strong Masonic, Hermetic, and possible Jacobite character. Lord Burlington's status as an important Freemason is indicated by his inclusion in the Freemason's Pocket Companion of 1736 and in a poem in James Anderson's Constitutions of the Free-Masons of 1723 where he is linked to an illustrious line of personalities important in Masonic lore. It has been argued that Chiswick House was a symbolic temple, based on so-called Royal Arch Freemasonry, involving a Hermetic intervention designed to heal the sufferings of the exiled Jews. Lord Burlington's handwritten list of titles in his library at Chiswick also shows that he supported a large number of publications by Freemasons. After completion of the Chiswick House villa in 1729, Burlington provided inspiration to other Masonic architects for numerous other buildings, such as Thomas Coke, 1st Earl of Leicester at Holkham Hall, Norfolk Charles Lennox, 2nd Duke of Richmond, at Goodwood House, and the Mansion House, nicknamed the "Egyptian Hall" for its columns.

In 1739, Lord Burlington was involved in the founding of a new charitable organisation called the Foundling Hospital. Burlington was a governor of the charity, but did not formally take part in planning the construction of this large Bloomsbury children's home, completed in 1742. The architect for the building was a Theodore Jacobsen, who took on the commission as an act of charity.

Many of Lord Burlington's projects have suffered from rebuilding or additions, from fire, or from losses due to urban sprawl. In many cases, his ideas were informal: at Holkham Hall, the architect Matthew Brettingham recalled that "the general ideas were first struck out by the Earl of Burlington and the Earl of Leicester, assisted by Mr. William Kent." Brettingham's engraved publication of Holkham credited Burlington specifically with the ceilings for the portico and the north dressing room.

Lord Burlington's architectural drawings, inherited by his son-in-law, William Cavendish, 4th Duke of Devonshire, are preserved at Chatsworth House, and enable attributions that would not otherwise be possible. In 1751, he sent some of his drawings to Francesco Algarotti in Potsdam, together with a book on Vitruvius.

Palazzo facade drawn by Andrea Palladio, purchased in Italy by Inigo Jones. Burlington purchased it from the heirs of Jones' pupil John Webb and adapted it for the London house of General Wade. Note the Palladian window.

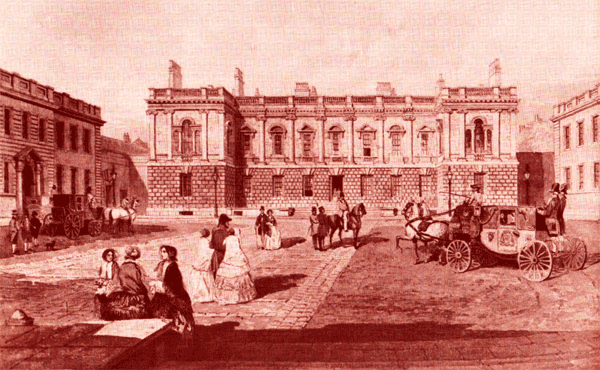
Colen Campbell's Burlington House as it was in 1855, before a third storey was added.

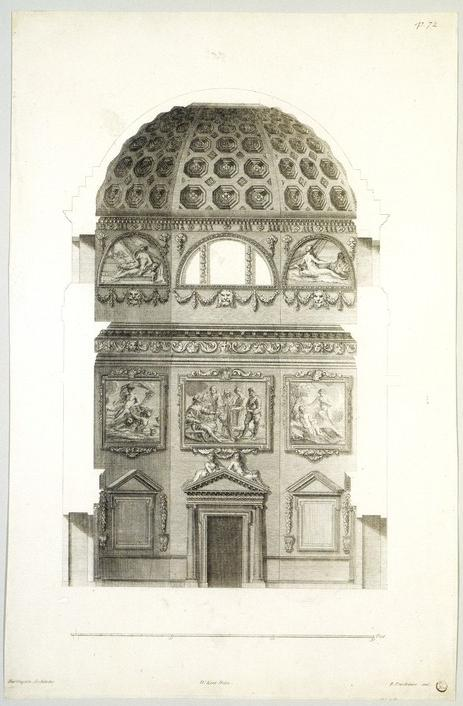
Plate 72, Cross-section of Octagon at Chiswick House, Richard Boyle, 1727, V&A Museum no. 12957:33.

== Major projects ==
- Burlington House, Piccadilly, London: Lord Burlington's own contribution to the house is likely to have been restricted to the former colonnade (demolished 1868) of the building. A monumental screening gateway to Piccadilly was built and the principle interiors of the house were reconstructed with typical Palladian features. In London, Burlington offered designs for features at several aristocratic free-standing dwellings, none of which have survived: Queensbury House in Burlington Gardens (a gateway); Warwick House, Warwick Street (interiors); Richmond House, Whitehall (the main building).
- Tottenham House, Wiltshire, for his brother-in-law, Charles Bruce, 3rd Earl of Ailesbury: Built from 1721, executed by Lord Burlington's protégé Henry Flitcroft (enlarged and remodelled since). In the original house, the high corner pavilion blocks of Inigo Jones' Wilton House were provided with the "Palladian window" motif to be seen at Burlington House. Burlington, with a good eye for garden effects, also designed the ornamental buildings in the park (now demolished).
- Westminster School, the Dormitory: Built between 1722 – 1730 (altered, bombed, and restored), the first public work by Lord Burlington, for which Sir Christopher Wren had provided a design which was rejected in favor of Burlington's, exhibited as a triumph for the Palladians and a sign of changing English taste.
- Old Burlington Street, London: Houses, including one for General Wade which was built in 1723 (demolished). General Wade's house rendered the genuine Palladio facade in Lord Burlington's collection of drawings.
- Waldershare Park, Kent, the Belvedere Tower: Built between 1725 – 27. A design for an eye-catcher garden that might have been attributed to Colen Campbell were it not have been for a ground plan found among Lord Burlington's drawings at Chatsworth House.
- Chiswick House Villa, Middlesex: The "Casina" in the gardens, constructed in 1717, was Lord Burlington's first essay. The villa, built between 1727 and 1729, is considered to be the finest remaining example of Neo-Palladain architecture in London and one of the gems of European 18th-century architecture. An attempt made by Burlington to create a Roman villa situated in a symbolic Roman garden. He built the villa with enough space to house his art collection, regarded as containing "some of the best pictures in Europe", and his more select pieces of furniture, some of which was purchased on his first Grand Tour of Europe in 1714.
- Sevenoaks School, School House: Built in 1730. The school depicts classic Palladian work, commissioned by Lord Burlington's friend Elijah Fenton.
- The York Assembly Rooms: Built between 1731 – 32 (facade remodelled). In the basilica-like space, Lord Burlington attempted an archaeological reconstruction "with doctrinaire exactitude" (Colvin 1995) of the "Egyptian Hall" described by Vitruvius, as it had been interpreted in Palladio's Quattro Libri. The result was one of the grandest Palladian public spaces.
- Castle Hill, Devonshire.
- Northwick Park, Gloucestershire.
- Kirby Hall, Yorkshire (an elevation).

== Marriage and children ==
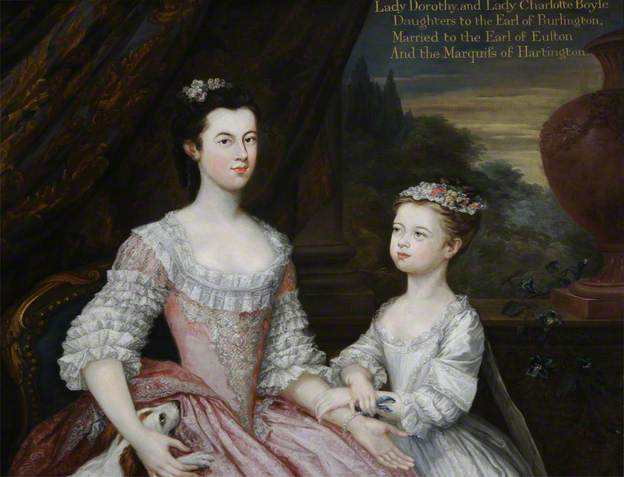
Dorothy Savile, Lady Dorothy Boyle (1724–1742), Countess of Euston, and Her Sister Lady Charlotte Boyle (1731–1754), Later Marchioness of Hartington, National Trust, Hardwick Hall. Supplied by The Public Catalogue Foundation.

Burlington married Lady Dorothy Savile on 21 March 1720, the daughter of William Savile, 2nd Marquess of Halifax and his second wife, Lady Mary Finch.

Mary was the daughter of Daniel Finch, 2nd Earl of Nottingham and Lady Essex Rich (died 1684). Essex was the daughter of Robert Rich, 3rd Earl of Warwick, and Anne Cheeke. Anne was the daughter of Sir Thomas Cheeke of Pirgo and an earlier Lady Essex Rich (died 1659). This Lady Essex was the daughter of Robert Rich, 1st Earl of Warwick and Lady Penelope Devereux. Essex was probably named after her maternal grandfather Walter Devereux, 1st Earl of Essex. Her maternal grandmother was Lettice Knollys.

They had three daughters:

- Lady Dorothy Boyle (14 May 1724 – 2 May 1742). She was married to George FitzRoy, Earl of Euston, second son of Charles FitzRoy, 2nd Duke of Grafton and Lady Henrietta Somerset. No known descendants.
- Lady Julianna Boyle (1727–1730).
- Lady Charlotte Elizabeth Boyle (27 October 1731 – 8 December 1754). She married William Cavendish, Marquess of Hartington (later Duke of Devonshire after her death). They were parents to William Cavendish, 5th Duke of Devonshire, George Cavendish, 1st Earl of Burlington, and two other children.

Burlington died at Chiswick House, aged 59. Upon his death, the Earldom of Cork passed to a cousin, John Boyle, and the title of the Earl of Burlington became extinct. It was recreated in 1831 for his grandson, George Cavendish, and is now held by the Cavendish family as a courtesy title for the Dukes of Devonshire.

== Gallery of architectural works ==
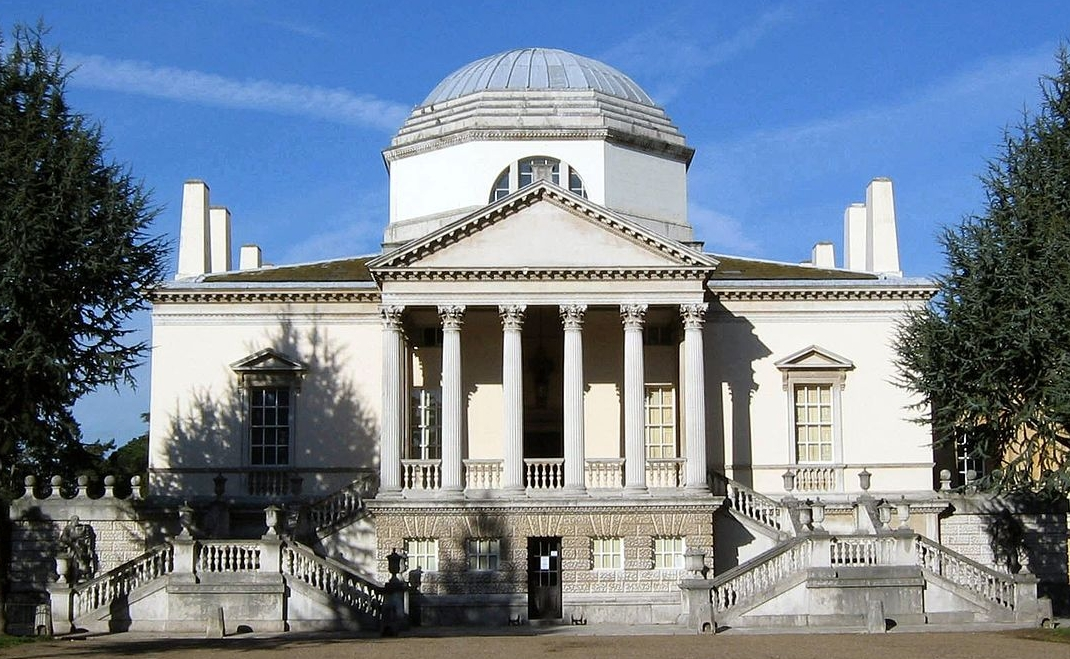
Chiswick House Entrance Front

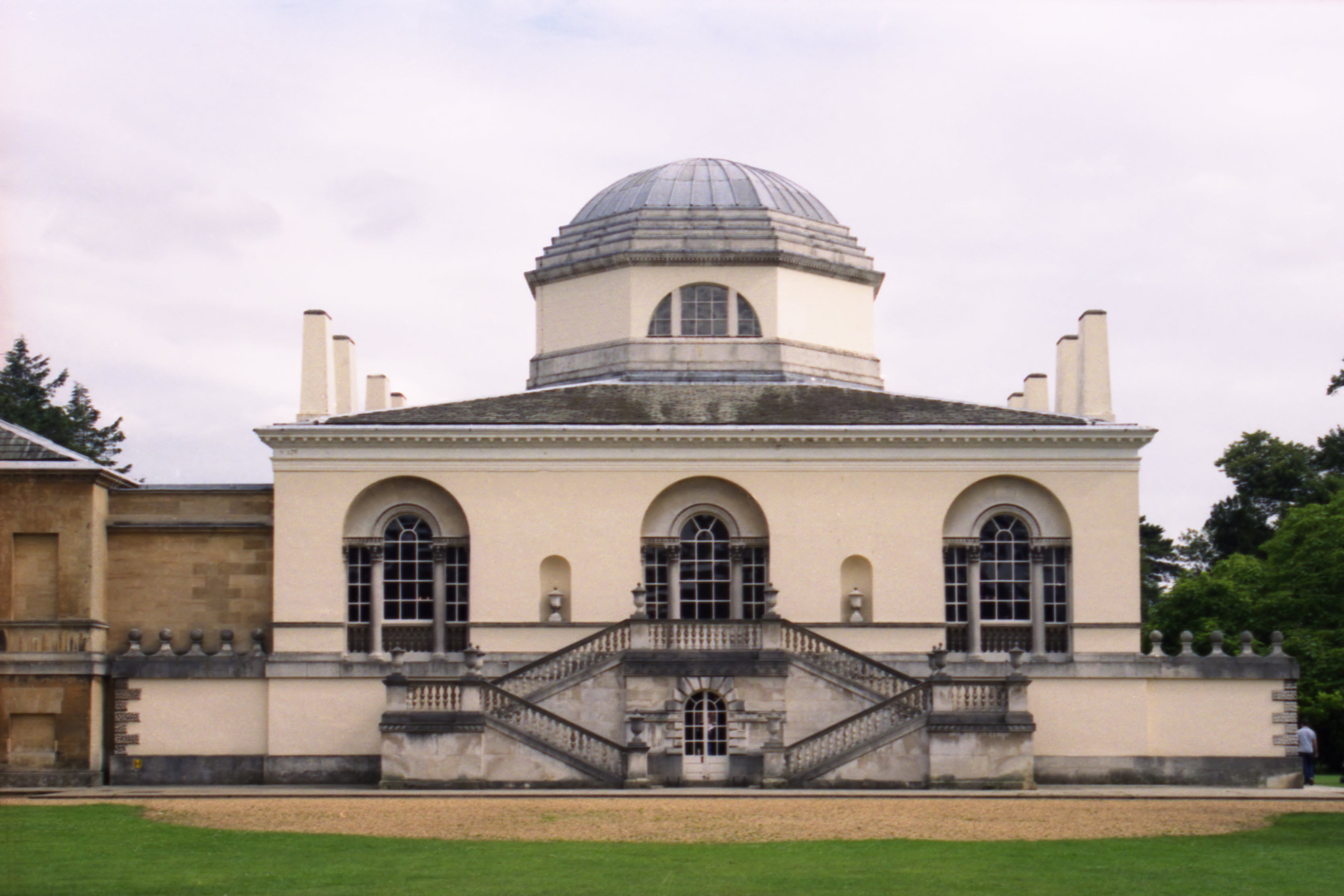
Chiswick House Garden Front

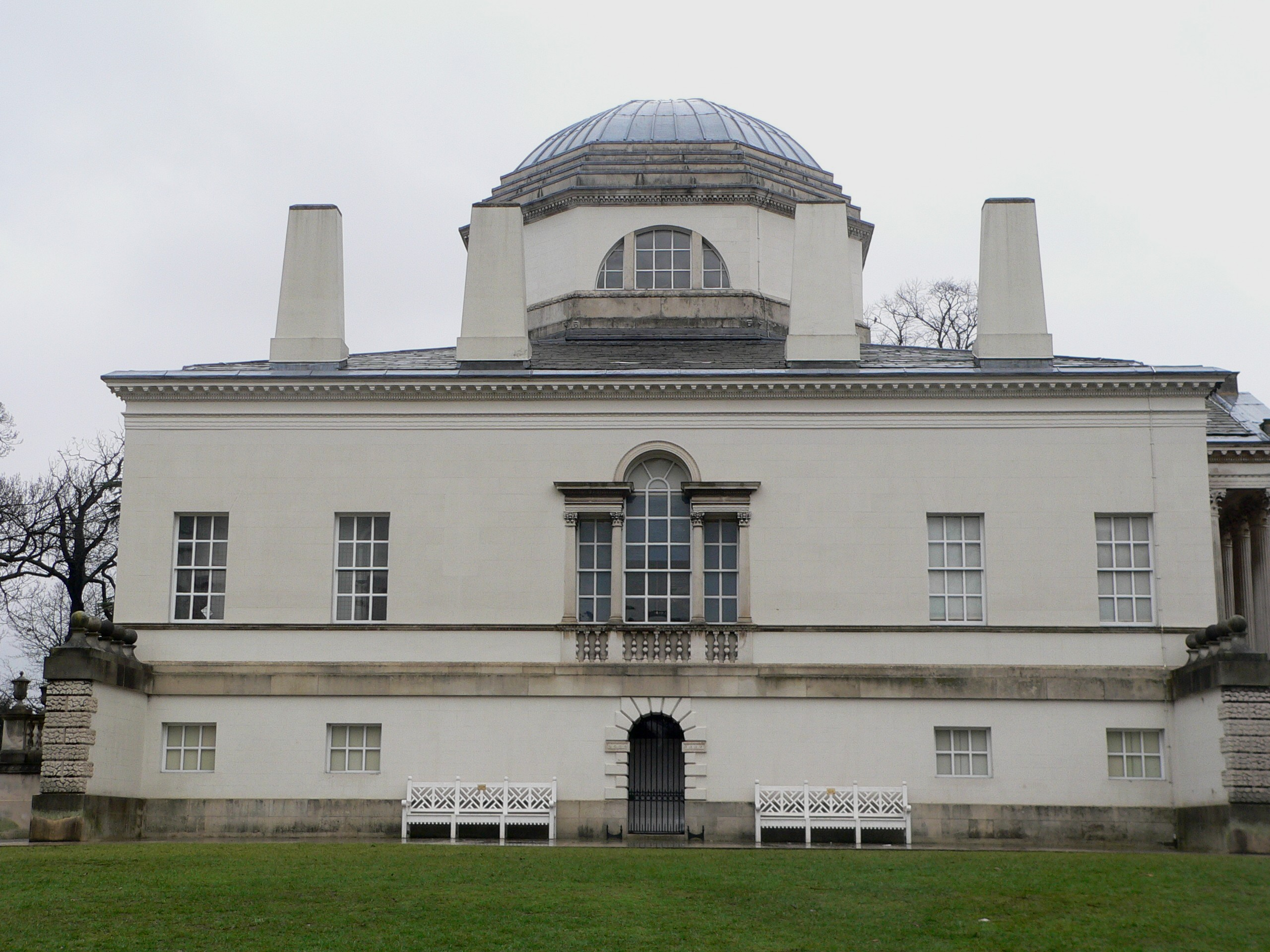
Chiswick House south western view

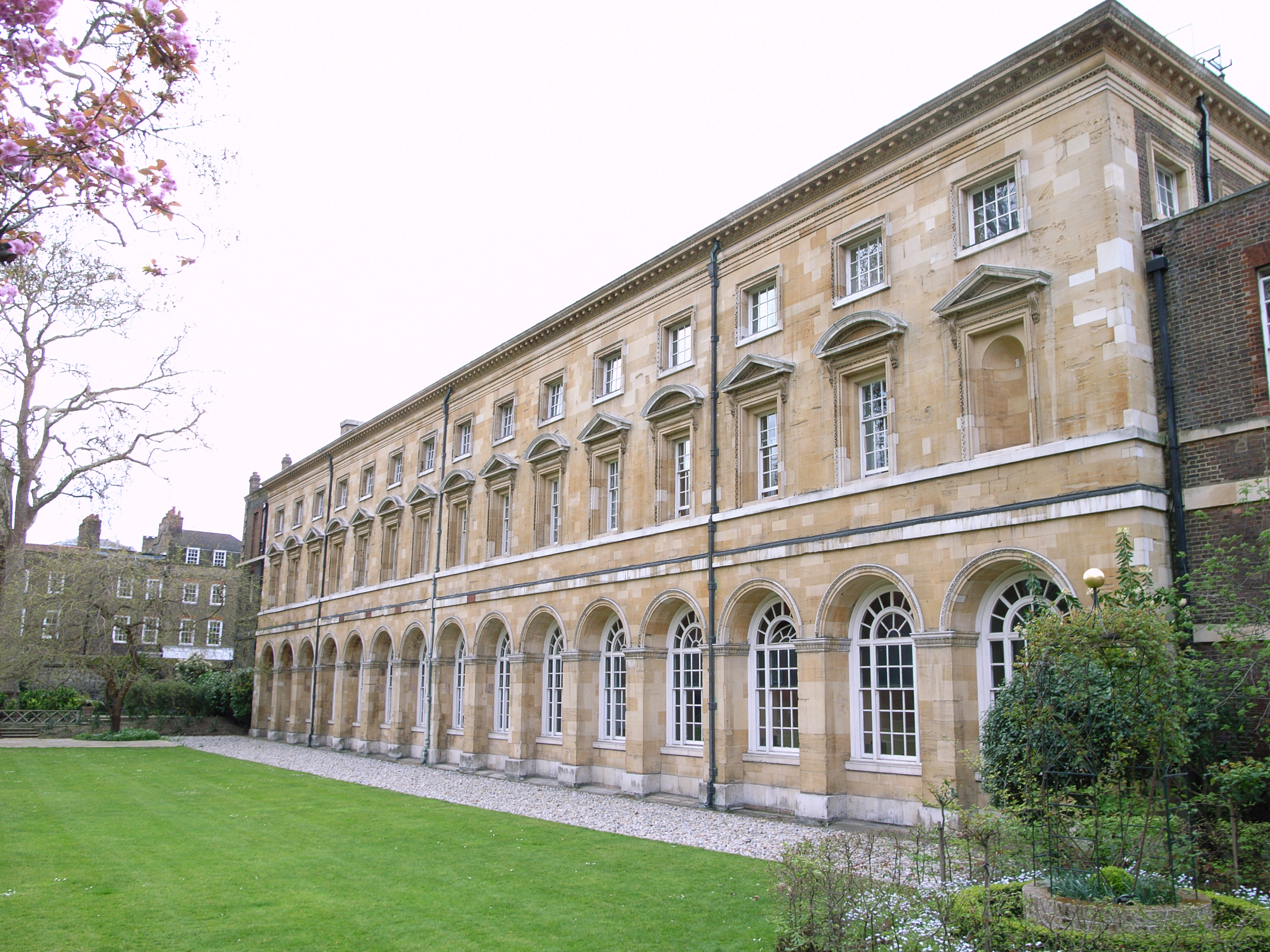
Westminster School Dormitory

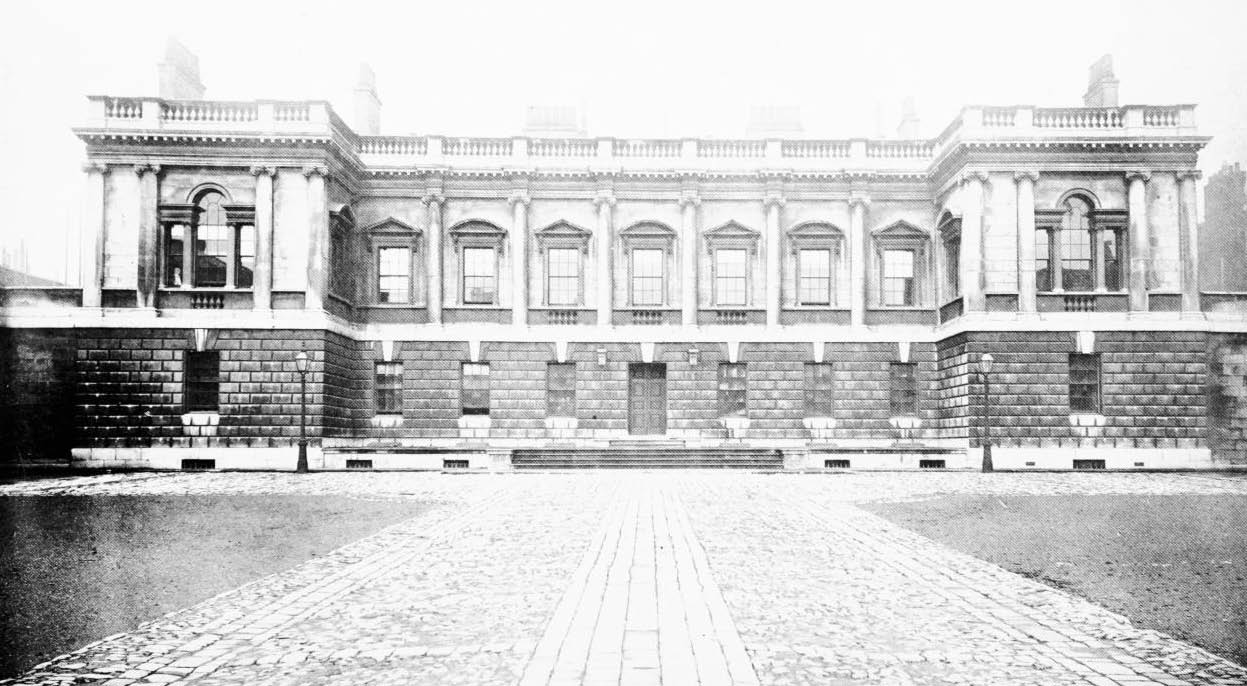
Burlington House

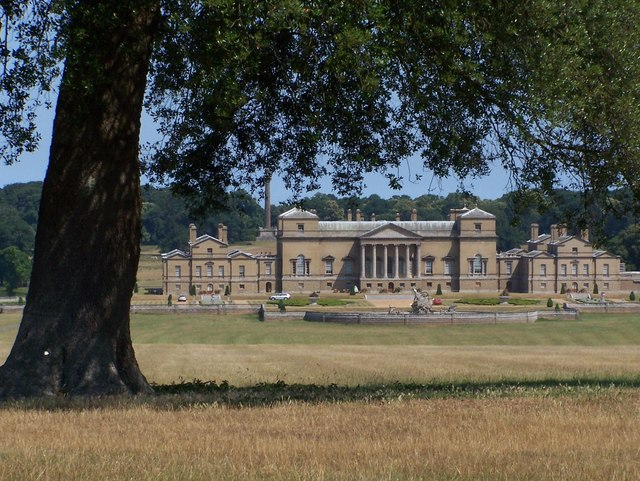
Holkham Hall

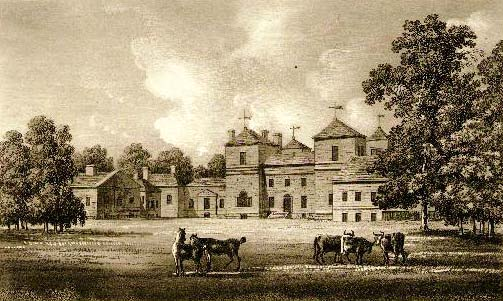
Tottenham House

Political offices
Preceded by The Lord Carleton	Lord Treasurer of Ireland; 1715–1753	Succeeded by Marquess of Hartington
Honorary titles
Preceded by The 5th Viscount of Irvine	Custos Rotulorum of the East Riding of Yorkshire; 1715–1721	Succeeded by William Pulteney
Preceded by The Lord Carleton	Custos Rotulorum of the North Riding of Yorkshire; 1715–1722	Succeeded by Conyers Darcy
Preceded by The Lord Carleton	Vice-Admiral of Yorkshire; 1715–1739	Succeeded by Sir Conyers Darcy (North Riding); The 7th Viscount of Irvine (East Riding)
Preceded by The Lord Carleton	Lord Lieutenant of the West Riding of Yorkshire; 1715–1733	Succeeded by The Lord Malton
Preceded by Conyers Darcy	Custos Rotulorum of the North Riding of Yorkshire; 1722–1733	Succeeded by The Lord Malton
Preceded by The Duke of Devonshire	Captain of the Gentlemen Pensioners; 1731–1734	Succeeded by The Duke of Montagu
Peerage of Ireland
Preceded by Charles Boyle	Earl of Cork; 1704–1753	Succeeded by John Boyle
Peerage of England
Preceded by Charles Boyle	Earl of Burlington; 1704–1753	Extinct
Preceded by Charles Boyle	Baron Clifford; 1704–1753	Succeeded by Charlotte Cavendish
