= Custos Rotulorum of the North Riding of Yorkshire =

This is a list of people who have served as Custos Rotulorum of the North Riding of Yorkshire.

- Sir Leonard Beckwith bef. 1544 – aft. 1547
- Sir Henry Gates bef. 1562–1589
- John Stanhope, 1st Baron Stanhope 1545–1621
- Sir Thomas Posthumous Hoby 1621–1626
- Sir David Foulis, 1st Baronet 1626–1629
- Sir Thomas Posthumous Hoby 1629–1640
- Henry Belasyse 1641–1646
- Interregnum
- Thomas Belasyse, 1st Earl Fauconberg 1660–1700
- Charles Boyle, 2nd Earl of Burlington 1701–1704
- Henry Boyle, 1st Baron Carleton 1704–1715
- Richard Boyle, 3rd Earl of Burlington 1715–1722
- Conyers Darcy 1722
- Richard Boyle, 3rd Earl of Burlington 1722–1733
- Thomas Watson-Wentworth, 1st Marquess of Rockingham 1733–1750
- Charles Watson-Wentworth, 2nd Marquess of Rockingham 1751–1762
- Robert Darcy, 4th Earl of Holderness 1762–1765
- Charles Watson-Wentworth, 2nd Marquess of Rockingham 1765–1782
- Henry Belasyse, 2nd Earl Fauconberg 1782–1802

For later custodes rotulorum, see Lord Lieutenant of the North Riding of Yorkshire.
