= Viscount Boyle of Kinalmeaky =

Title in the peerage of Ireland

Viscount Boyle of Kinalmeaky, in the County of Cork, is a title in the Peerage of Ireland. It was created in 1628 for the eight-year-old the Hon. Lewis Boyle, second son of Richard Boyle, 1st Earl of Cork, with remainder, in default of male issue of his own, to the heirs male of his father. He was killed at the Battle of Liscarrol in 1642, aged twenty-three, and was succeeded according to the special remainder by his elder brother Richard, who the following year also succeeded his father as second Earl of Cork.

== Viscounts Boyle of Kinalmeaky (1628) ==
- Lewis Boyle, 1st Viscount Boyle of Kinalmeaky (1619–1642)
- Richard Boyle, 1st Earl of Burlington, 2nd Earl of Cork, 2nd Viscount Boyle of Kinalmeaky (1612–1698)

For further succession see the Earl of Cork
