= Lord Lieutenant of the West Riding of Yorkshire =

Civil post in Yorkshire, England

This is a list of those who have held the position of Lord Lieutenant of the West Riding of Yorkshire from its creation in 1660 to its abolition on 31 March 1974. From 1699 until 1974, all Lords Lieutenant were also Custos Rotulorum of the West Riding of Yorkshire. The incumbent Lord Lieutenant became in 1974 Lord Lieutenant of West Yorkshire, covering a smaller area.

== Lord Lieutenants of the West Riding of Yorkshire to 1974 ==
- Marmaduke Langdale, 1st Baron Langdale 9 October 1660 – 5 August 1661
- George Villiers, 2nd Duke of Buckingham 5 September 1661 – 14 March 1667
- Richard Boyle, 1st Earl of Burlington 14 March 1667 – 22 November 1667
- George Villiers, 2nd Duke of Buckingham 22 November 1667 – 13 March 1674
- Thomas Osborne, 1st Duke of Leeds 13 March 1674 – 8 May 1679
- Richard Boyle, 1st Earl of Burlington 8 May 1679 – 23 March 1688
- Lord Thomas Howard 23 March 1688 – 5 October 1688
- Henry Cavendish, 2nd Duke of Newcastle-upon-Tyne 5 October 1688 – 10 May 1689
- Thomas Osborne, 1st Duke of Leeds 10 May 1689 – 29 September 1699
- Charles Boyle, 2nd Earl of Burlington 29 September 1699 – 9 February 1704
- Henry Boyle, 1st Baron Carleton 6 April 1704 – 10 June 1715
- Richard Boyle, 3rd Earl of Burlington 10 June 1715 – 29 September 1733
- Thomas Watson-Wentworth, 1st Marquess of Rockingham 29 September 1733 – 14 December 1750
- Charles Watson-Wentworth, 2nd Marquess of Rockingham 18 July 1751 – 25 February 1763
- Francis Hastings, 10th Earl of Huntingdon 25 February 1763 – 12 September 1765
- Charles Watson-Wentworth, 2nd Marquess of Rockingham 12 September 1765 – 1 July 1782
- Charles Howard, 11th Duke of Norfolk 23 October 1782 – 2 March 1798
- William FitzWilliam, 4th Earl FitzWilliam 2 March 1798 – 18 November 1819
- Henry Lascelles, 2nd Earl of Harewood 18 November 1819 – 24 November 1841
- James Stuart-Wortley-Mackenzie, 1st Baron Wharncliffe 29 December 1841 – 19 December 1845
- Henry Lascelles, 3rd Earl of Harewood 17 January 1846 – 22 February 1857
- William Wentworth-FitzWilliam, 6th Earl FitzWilliam 31 March 1857 – 23 August 1892
- Aldred Lumley, 10th Earl of Scarbrough 23 August 1892 – 22 April 1904
- Henry Lascelles, 5th Earl of Harewood 22 April 1904 – 14 December 1927
- Henry Lascelles, 6th Earl of Harewood 14 December 1927 – 23 May 1947
- Lawrence Lumley, 11th Earl of Scarbrough 9 February 1948 – 29 June 1969
- Kenneth Hargreaves 23 February 1970 – 31 March 1974†

†Became Lord Lieutenant of West Yorkshire.
