= Charles Boyle, 2nd Earl of Burlington =

Anglo-Irish peer, courtier and politician

The Right Honourable The Earl of Burlington PC
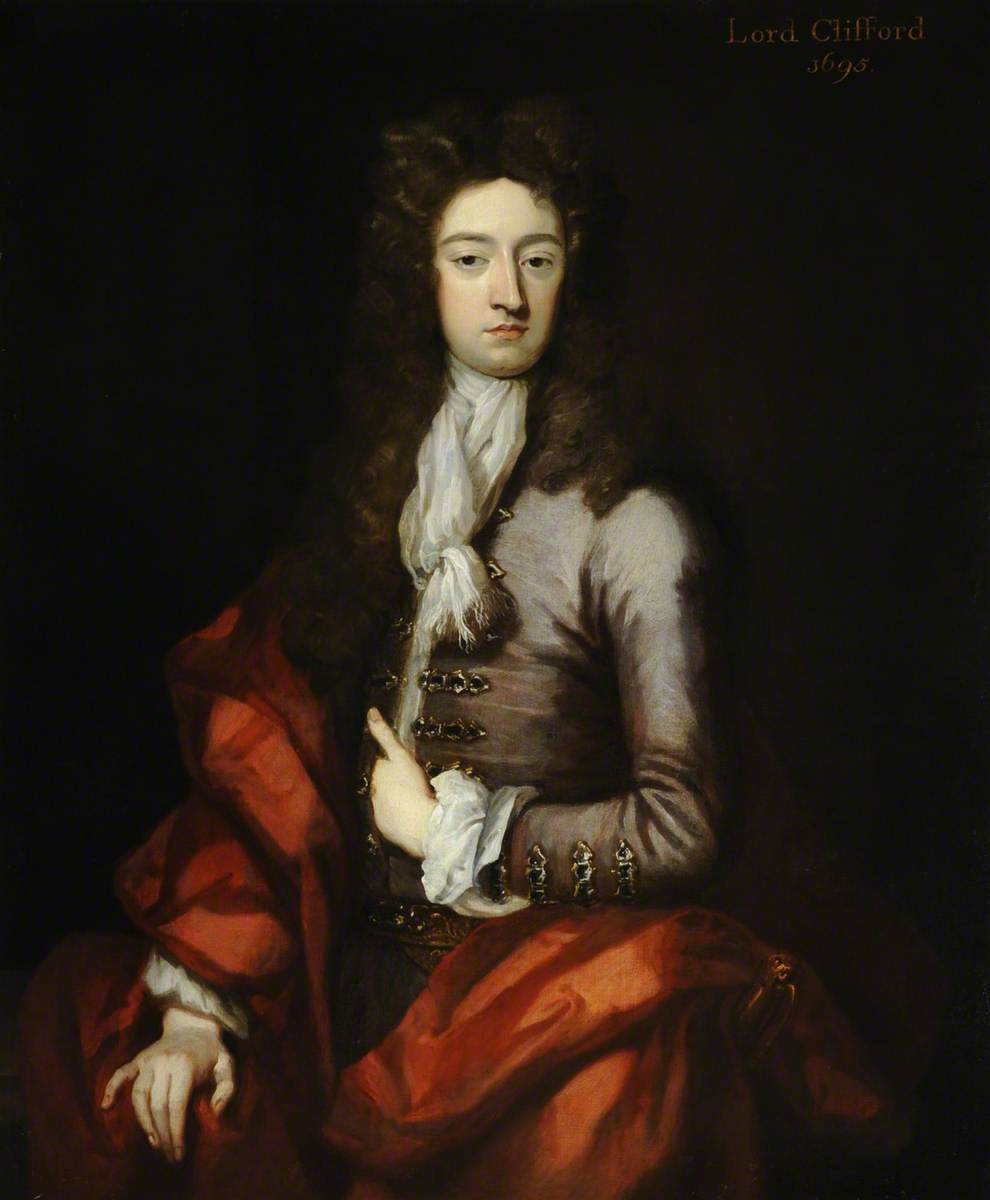

Lord High Treasurer of Ireland
- In office 1695–1704
- Preceded by: The 1st Earl of Burlington
- Succeeded by: The Lord Carleton

Personal details
- Died: 9 February 1704
- Spouse: Juliana Noel
- Children: Elizabeth Boyle, Lady Bedingfeld; Richard Boyle, 3rd Earl of Burlington; Juliana Boyle, Countess of Ailesbury; Jane Boyle; Henrietta Boyle, Countess of Shannon
- Parent(s): Charles Boyle, 3rd Viscount Dungarvan; Lady Jane Seymour
- Occupation: Aristocrat, politician

Charles Boyle, 2nd Earl of Burlington, PC (d. 9 February 1704) was an Anglo-Irish peer, courtier and politician.

== Early life ==
Hon. Charles Boyle was the eldest son of Charles Boyle, 3rd Viscount Dungarvan and his first wife, Lady Jane Seymour.

== Career ==
In 1690, he became Member of Parliament for Appleby and also Governor of County Cork the following year. In 1694, he resigned his seat when he inherited his father's titles of Viscount Dungarvan, Baron Clifford and Baron Clifford of Lanesborough. In 1695, he was admitted to the Privy Council of Ireland and appointed Lord High Treasurer of Ireland. In 1698, he inherited his grandfather's titles of Earl of Burlington and Earl of Cork and was appointed a Lord of the Bedchamber that same year. In 1699, he was appointed Lord Lieutenant of the West Riding of Yorkshire and in 1702 admitted to the Privy Council of England.

He died in 1704 and his titles passed to his eldest son, Richard.

== Personal life and death ==
On 26 January 1688, at Ely House, Charles Boyle married Juliana Noel (1672–1750), the only daughter and heiress of Hon. Henry Noel (himself the second son of Baptist Noel, 3rd Viscount Campden by his third wife, Hester Wotton).

They had five surviving children:

- Lady Elizabeth Boyle (1690–1751), married Sir Henry Bedingfeld, 3rd Baronet.
- Richard Boyle, 3rd Earl of Burlington (1694–1753)
- Lady Juliana Boyle (c.1697–1739), married Charles Bruce, 3rd Earl of Ailesbury.
- Lady Jane Boyle (1699–1780), died unmarried.
- Lady Henrietta Boyle (1701–1746), married her distant cousin, Henry Boyle, 1st Earl of Shannon, in 1726.

The 2nd Earl of Burlington died on 9 February 1704. As Dowager Countess, his widow served as a Lady of the Bedchamber at the court of Queen Anne.

== Bibliography ==
- Murdoch, Tessa (ed.), Great Irish Households: Inventories from the Long Eighteenth Century. Cambridge: John Adamson, 2022 ISBN 978-1-898565-17-8 OCLC 1233305993. See pp. 20–3 for a transcript of the inventory of his goods at Lismore Castle, Co. Waterford.

Parliament of England
Preceded by Richard Lowther and William Cheyne	Member of Parliament for Appleby; 1690–1694; With: William Cheyne	Succeeded by William Cheyne and Sir John Walter, Bt.
Political offices
Preceded by Richard Boyle as Lord Treasurer of Ireland	Lord High Treasurer of Ireland; 1695–1704	Succeeded by The Lord Carleton
Honorary titles
Preceded by The Duke of Leeds	Lord Lieutenant of the West Riding of Yorkshire; 1699–1704	Succeeded by Henry Boyle
Vacant Title last held by The Marquess of Halifax	Custos Rotulorum of the West Riding of Yorkshire; 1699–1704	Succeeded by Henry Boyle
Preceded by The Earl Fauconberg	Custos Rotulorum of the North Riding of Yorkshire; 1701–1704	Succeeded by Henry Boyle
Preceded by The Viscount Irvine	Vice-Admiral of Yorkshire; 1702–1704	Succeeded by Henry Boyle
Peerage of Ireland
Preceded by Richard Boyle	Earl of Cork; 1698–1704	Succeeded by Richard Boyle
Preceded by Charles Boyle	Viscount Dungarvan; 1694–1704	Succeeded by Richard Boyle
Peerage of England
Preceded by Richard Boyle	Earl of Burlington; 1698–1704	Succeeded by Richard Boyle
Preceded by Charles Boyle	Baron Clifford; 1694–1704	Succeeded by Richard Boyle
Preceded by Charles Boyle	Baron Clifford of Lanesborough; 1694–1704	Succeeded by Richard Boyle
