= Richard Boyle, 1st Earl of Burlington =

English nobleman and politician

Richard Boyle
- 1st Earl of Burlington
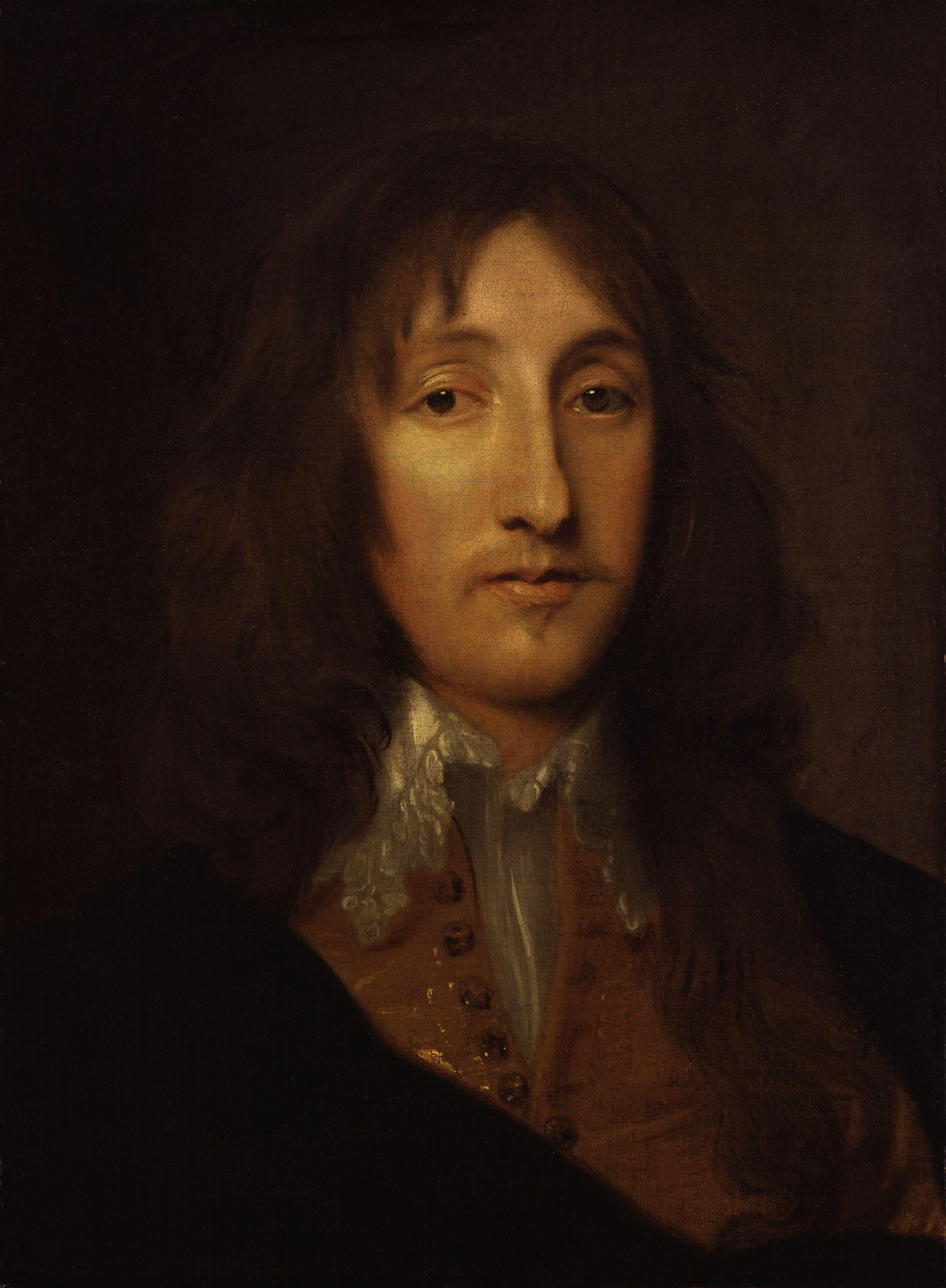
- The Earl of Burlington.
- Tenure: 1664–1698
- Other titles: 2nd Earl of Cork
- Known for: English Civil War
- Born: 20 October 1612; Youghal, County Cork, Ireland
- Died: 15 January 1698 (aged 85)
- Spouse: Lady Elizabeth Clifford
- Issue: Charles Boyle, 3rd Viscount Dungarvan; Richard Boyle; Frances Dillon, Countess of Roscommon; Elizabeth Tufton, Countess of Thanet; Mary Anne Montagu; Henrietta Hyde, Countess of Rochester
- Father: Richard Boyle, 1st Earl of Cork
- Mother: Catherine Fenton

Richard Boyle, 1st Earl of Burlington, 2nd Earl of Cork (20 October 1612 – 15 January 1698) was an Anglo-Irish nobleman who served as Lord High Treasurer of Ireland and was a Cavalier.

== Early life ==
He was born at The College in Youghal in the south-east of County Cork, Ireland, as the sixth child and second son of Richard Boyle, 1st Earl of Cork and his second wife, Catherine Fenton, daughter of Sir Geoffrey Fenton. His brother was the chemist Robert Boyle, and his sister was Lady Ranelagh. On 13 August 1624, The Hon. Richard Boyle, Jr., was knighted at his father's house in Youghal by Lord Falkland, the Lord Deputy of Ireland. As the Hon. Sir Richard Boyle, he then went on travels abroad with an annual allowance of £1500.

== Civil War ==
In 1639, the young Sir Richard undertook to raise, arm, and provide 100 horses to attend upon King Charles I of England in his expedition into the North of England against the Scots. For this and other occasions, his father, Lord Cork, supplied him with £5553 sterling. Sir Richard Boyle was returned as Member of Parliament for Appleby in the Long Parliament of 1640, and appointed a member of the Privy Council of England, but was subsequently excluded for his Royalist sympathies after the outbreak of the English Civil War.

He and Lord Inchiquin commanded the forces which defeated the Irish irregular army at the Battle of Liscarroll on 3 September 1642, thereby preserving the Protestant interest in southern Ireland for the remainder of the decade. A cessation of hostilities was concluded with the Irish a year later (15 September 1643). He then applied to the King, in December, for consent to bring his regiment to serve him in England, and landed his men near Chester the following February. He then marched to the King's aid in Dorset, supplying this monarch with large sums of money for his cause.

He fought throughout the Civil War until the final defeat of the Royalist forces. The Commonwealth fined him £1631 sterling and he then went abroad, returning to Ireland at the request of the government, dated 2 January 1651.

== Peerages and appointments ==
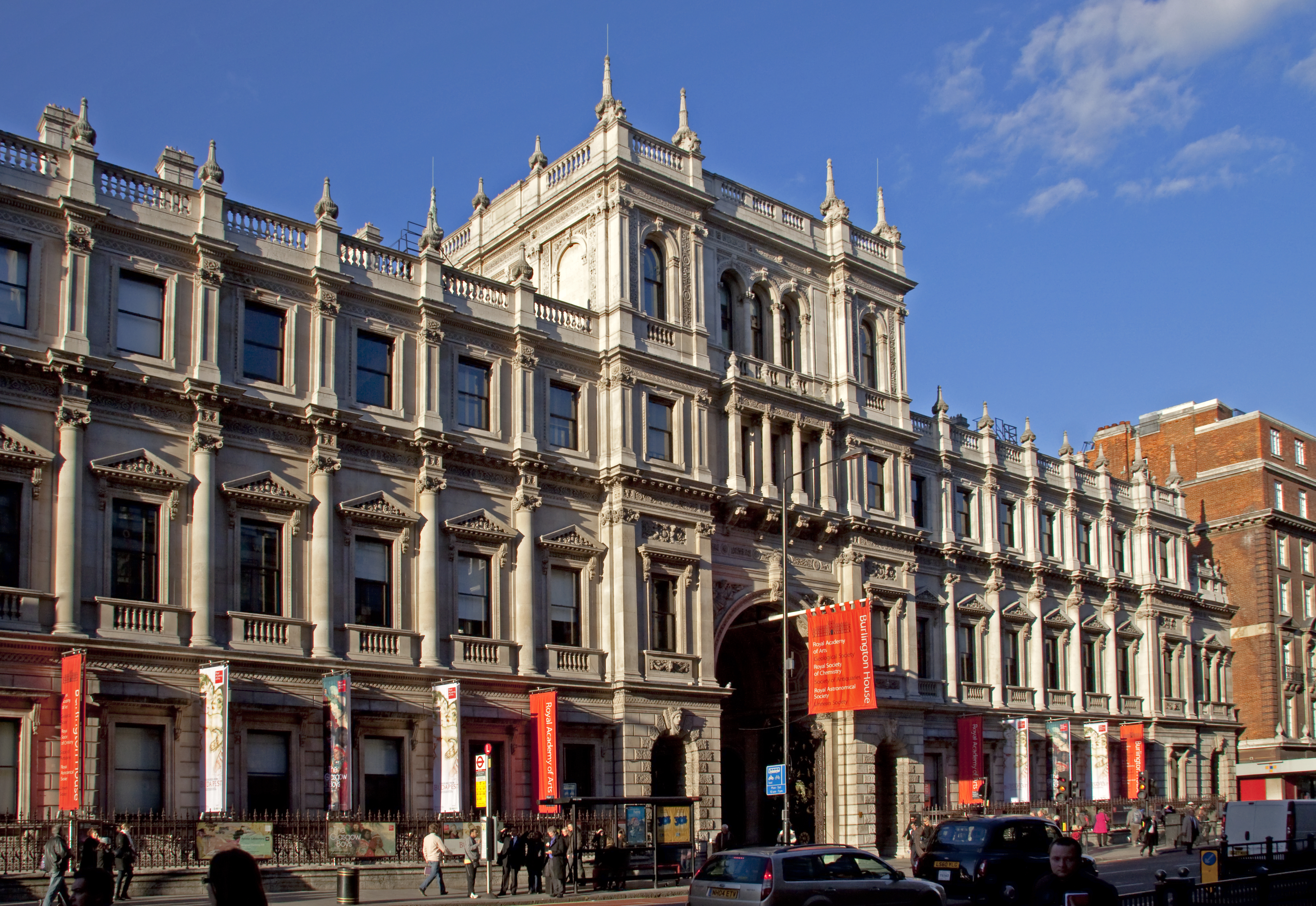
Burlington House, Mayfair, London

Upon the death of his brother, Lord Boyle of Kinalmeaky, on 2 September 1642, Richard Boyle succeeded as 2nd Viscount Boyle of Kinalmeaky. A year later, he succeeded as the 2nd Earl of Cork upon the death of his father on 15 September 1643. Further, King Charles I created him Baron Clifford of Londesborough in the County of York on 4 November 1644.

Following the Restoration, Richard was appointed a Privy Counsellor and Lord Treasurer of Ireland on 16 November 1660. On 22 February 1660, he was made Custos Rotulorum of County Cork and of Waterford, and on 19 March 1660, he was appointed one of the Commissioners for the settlement of Ireland following the King's declaration to that effect on 30 November 1659. On 25 June 1661, he took his seat above all the peers, as Lord Treasurer, in the Irish House of Lords in the Irish Parliament.

King Charles II of England created him Earl of Burlington on 20 March 1664, and on 13 March 1666, Richard was appointed Lord Lieutenant of Yorkshire.

In 1667, Richard purchased Burlington House in an incomplete state and proceeded to complete its construction. The house was the largest structure on his Burlington Estate and its name was derived from him.

Lord Burlington (as he was usually known for short from 1664 onwards), along with several other noblemen and Bishops of the Church of Ireland, were opposed to the attempts of King James II of England in regard to the restoration of Roman Catholicism and petitioned the King on 17 November 1688 to call a parliament "regular and free in all its circumstances". This petition had a hostile reception from King James. Following the arrival of William of Orange in England, King James removed to Ireland where he called a parliament in 1689, which passed an act of attainder against certain Protestants deemed disloyal to the king, and confiscated their estates, among whom was the Earl of Burlington (who was also Earl of Cork). This was overturned the following year by William of Orange when he ascended the throne.

On 3 March 1691, Richard was appointed to the newly incorporated Society of the Royal Fishery in Ireland.

== Family and death ==
At the age of 22, Richard Boyle married the 21-year-old Lady Elizabeth Clifford, daughter of Henry Clifford, 5th Earl of Cumberland and Lady Frances Cecil, on 5 July 1635 at Skipton Castle. They had six children:

- Charles Boyle, 3rd Viscount Dungarvan (1639–1694).
- Richard Boyle, who died on 3 June 1665 at the Battle of Lowestoft.
- Frances Boyle (born March 1636, died 1674 or earlier), who married firstly Colonel Francis Courtenay and secondly Wentworth Dillon, 4th Earl of Roscommon.
- Elizabeth Boyle, who married Nicholas Tufton, 3rd Earl of Thanet.
- Mary Anne Boyle, who married Edward Montagu, 2nd Earl of Sandwich.
- Henrietta Boyle, who married Lawrence Hyde, 1st Earl of Rochester.

Lord Burlington died on 6 January 1698 and was buried on 3 February 1698 at Londesborough in Yorkshire. He was succeeded by his grandson, Charles Boyle, 2nd Earl of Burlington.

== See also ==
- Burlington Estate

Honorary titles
| Preceded by The Duke of Buckingham | Lord Lieutenant of the West Riding of Yorkshire; 1667 | Succeeded by The Duke of Buckingham |
| Preceded by The Earl of Danby | Lord Lieutenant of the West Riding of Yorkshire; 1679–1688 | Succeeded by Lord Thomas Howard |
| Preceded by The Duke of Buckingham | Custos Rotulorum of the West Riding of Yorkshire; 1679–1685 | Vacant Title next held by Lord Thomas Howard |
Peerage of England
| New creation | Earl of Burlington; 1664–1698 | Succeeded by Charles Boyle |
| New creation | Baron Clifford of Lanesborough (descended by acceleration); 1644–1689 | Succeeded by Charles Boyle |
Peerage of Ireland
| Preceded by Richard Boyle | Earl of Cork; 1643–1698 | Succeeded by Charles Boyle |
| Preceded by Richard Boyle | Viscount Dungarvan (descended by acceleration); 1643–1663 | Succeeded by Charles Boyle |
| Preceded by Lewis Boyle | Viscount Boyle of Kinalmeaky; 1642–1698 | Succeeded by Charles Boyle |
