= John Boyle, 14th Earl of Cork =

British nobleman

John William Boyle, 14th Earl of Cork and 14th Earl of Orrery DSC VRD (12 May 1916 – 14 November 2003), styled The Honourable John Boyle from 1965 to 1995, was an Irish and British peer.

He was educated at Harrow and King's College London, graduating in 1937. He fought in World War II, being mentioned in despatches on two occasions, and was awarded the Distinguished Service Cross. He was married to Mary Gordon-Finlayson, daughter of General Sir Robert Gordon-Finlayson. His eldest son, John, succeeded him to the Earldom in 2003. John and Mary also had two younger sons: Robert and Reginald.

Ancestors of John Boyle, 14th Earl of Cork

16. Edmund Boyle, 8th Earl of Cork
8. Hon. John Boyle
17. Isabella-Henrietta Poyntz
4. Gerald Boyle
18. Lord Henry FitzGerald
9. Hon. Cecilia FitzGerald-de Ros
19. Charlotte Boyle-Walsingham, 21st Baroness de Ros
2. Hon. Reginald Boyle
20. Sir William Pepys, 1st Baronet
10. Charles Pepys, 1st Earl of Cottenham
21. Elizabeth Dowdeswell
5. Lady Elizabeth Pepys
22. William Wingfield-Baker
11. Caroline Wingfield
23. Lady Charlotte-Maria Digby
1. John Boyle, 14th Earl of Cork
24. John Flower
12. Philip Flower
25. Martha Wickham
6. Arthur Flower
26. Jonathan Flower
13. Mary Flower
27. Mary Nurse
3. Violet Flower
28. Philip Pauncefort-Duncombe
14. Sir Philip Pauncefort-Duncombe, 1st Baronet
29. Lady Alicia Lambert
7. Isabel Pauncefort-Duncombe
30. Thomas Maunsell
15. Sophia Maunsell
31. Hon. Caroline Cokayne

Peerage of Ireland
Preceded by Patrick Boyle	Earl of Cork; Earl of Orrery; 1995–2003	Succeeded by John Boyle
