= John Boyle, 15th Earl of Cork =

British hereditary peer and member of the House of Lords (born 1945)

Lieutenant Commander The Right Honourable The Earl of Cork
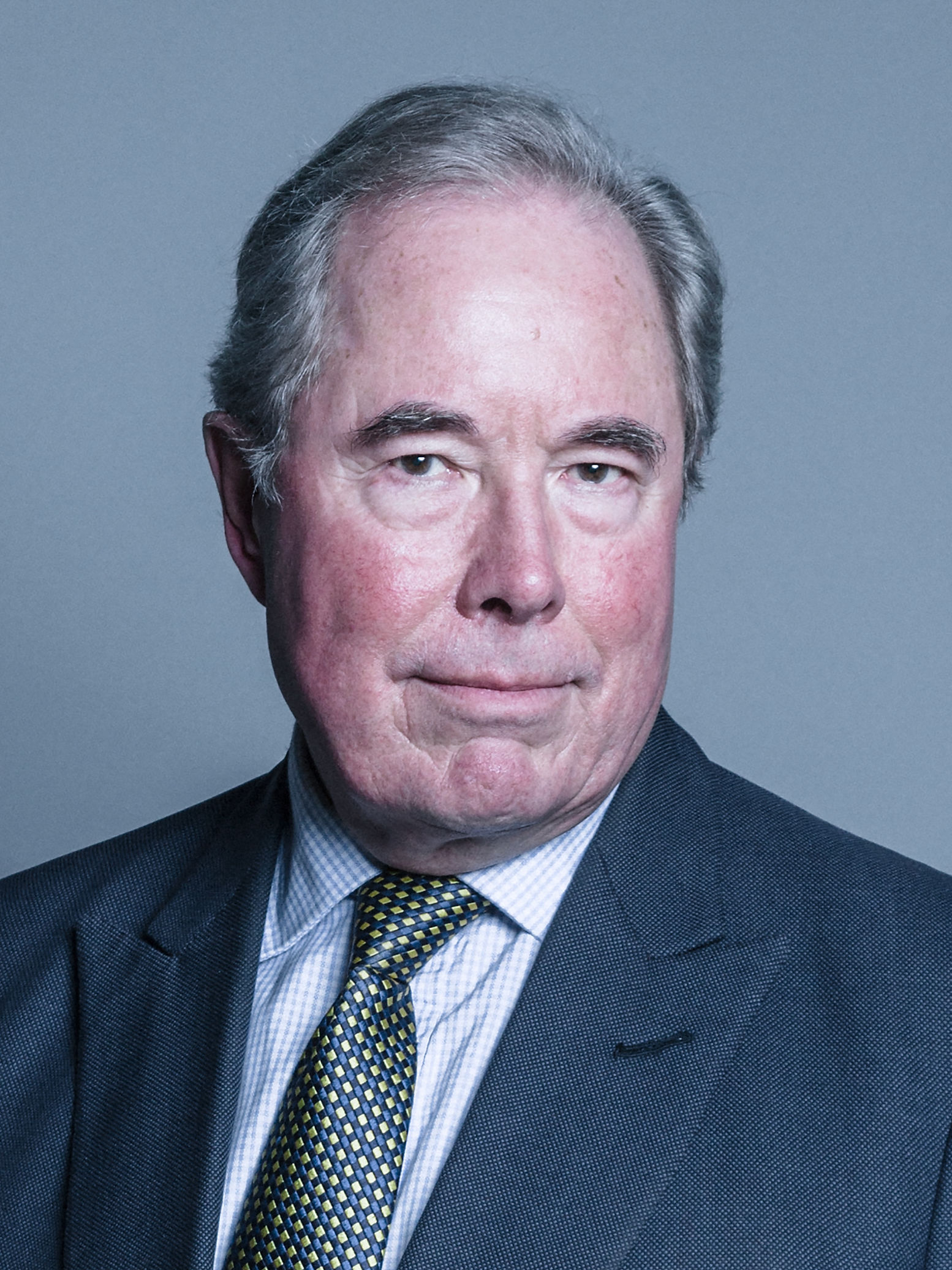
- Official parliamentary portrait, 2017

Member of the House of Lords
- Lord Temporal
- Elected Hereditary Peer; 19 July 2016 – 29 April 2026
- By-election: 2016
- Preceded by: The 2nd Baron Bridges
- Succeeded by: Seat abolished

Personal details
- Born: John Richard Boyle; 3 November 1945 (age 80)
- Party: Crossbench
- Spouse: Rebecca Juliet Noble
- Military career
- Allegiance: United Kingdom
- Branch: Royal Navy
- Service years: 1965–1979
- Rank: Lieutenant Commander
- Commands: HMS Sealion

John Richard Boyle, 15th Earl of Cork and 15th Earl of Orrery (born 3 November 1945) is a British hereditary peer and a former member of the House of Lords, where he sat as a Crossbencher. Boyle was an officer in the Royal Navy and then had a career in the sugar industry before inheriting his titles in 2003.

== Royal Navy ==
Boyle entered the Royal Navy and graduated from Royal Naval College, Dartmouth. In 1976, as a Lieutenant-Commander, he was given the command of HMS Sealion but retired from the Royal Navy in 1979 and went to work in the sugar industry.

== Politics ==
Boyle was first styled as Viscount Dungarvan as a courtesy title from 1995 following his father inheriting the earldoms. He inherited the title of Earl of Cork and Orrery following the death of his father, John Boyle, 14th Earl of Cork on 14 November 2003.

He was elected to sit in the House of Lords at a crossbench hereditary peers' by-election in July 2016, following Lord Bridges ceasing to be a member of the House owing to his non-attendance of the House, a provision that was created following the passage of the House of Lords Reform Act 2014. He defeated Richard Hubert Gordon Gilbey, 12th Baron Vaux of Harrowden by 15 votes to 8 in a vote of all sitting crossbench hereditary peers. Though his Irish titles came from the Peerage of Ireland, which did not make him eligible for election, he also holds the title of Baron Boyle of Marston in the Peerage of Great Britain which allowed him to stand in the by-election for hereditary peers. In the House of Lords, he was referred to by his higher ranking Irish titles as Earl of Cork and Orrery despite being elected via his barony.

== Personal life ==
The Earl of Cork and Orrery was educated at Harrow School. He is married to Rebecca Juliet née Noble, daughter of Michael Noble, Baron Glenkinglas. They have three children.

Peerage of Ireland
Preceded by John Boyle	Earl of Cork; 2003–present	Incumbent
Preceded by John Boyle	Earl of Orrery; 2003–present	Incumbent
Parliament of the United Kingdom
Preceded by The Lord Bridges	Elected hereditary peer to the House of Lords under the House of Lords Act 1999; Sat as Baron Boyle of Marston; 2016–2026	Position abolished under the House of Lords (Hereditary Peers) Act 2026
