= Charles Boyle, 3rd Viscount Dungarvan =

English peer and politician (1639–1694)

Charles Boyle, Viscount Dungarvan
- Baptised: 12 December 1639
- Died: 12 October 1694
- Occupations: Aristocrat, politician
- Spouses: Lady Jane Seymour; Lady Arethusa Berkeley
- Children: Elizabeth Boyle, Countess of Barrymore; Mary Boyle, Duchess of Queensberry; Charles Boyle, 2nd Earl of Burlington; Henry Boyle, 1st Baron Carleton; Arabella Boyle, Countess of Shelburne; Arethusa Boyle-Vernon
- Parent(s): Richard Boyle, 1st Earl of Burlington; Lady Elizabeth Clifford

Charles Boyle, Viscount Dungarvan, 3rd Baron Clifford, FRS (bapt. 12 December 1639 – 12 October 1694), was an English peer and politician. He was a member of a famous Anglo-Irish aristocratic family.

== Early life ==
Charles Boyle was the son of Richard Boyle, 1st Earl of Burlington, and his wife, Lady Elizabeth Clifford, 2nd Baroness Clifford suo jure, and was styled with the courtesy title of Viscount Dungarvan from birth.

== Career ==
In 1663, Charles Boyle was called to the Irish House of Lords as Viscount Dungarvan and became a Fellow of the Royal Society the following year.

From 1670 to 1679, Charles was Member of Parliament for Tamworth in the British House of Commons, and then for Yorkshire from 1679 onward. In 1682, he purchased the original Chiswick House which was a Jacobean house owned by Sir Edward Wardour. The house was used as a summer retreat by the Boyle family from their central London residence, Burlington House. In 1689, he was called to the British House of Lords for the Barony of Clifford of Lanesborough, which had been created for his father in 1644.

On his mother's death in 1691, Charles inherited the Barony of Clifford. As he predeceased his father in 1694, his titles passed to his eldest son, Charles Boyle who succeeded his grandfather as the 2nd Earl of Burlington.

== Personal life and death ==
On 7 May 1661, Charles Boyle had married Lady Jane Seymour (1637–1679), the fourth daughter of William Seymour, 2nd Duke of Somerset and his wife, Lady Frances Devereux. They had five children:

- Hon. Elizabeth Boyle (1662–1703), married her second cousin James Barry, 4th Earl of Barrymore.
- Hon. Mary Boyle (c. 1664–1709), married James Douglas, 2nd Duke of Queensberry.
- Hon. Charles Boyle (bef. 1669–1704), later 4th Viscount Dungarvan, and later still 3rd Earl of Cork and 2nd Earl of Burlington.
- Hon. Henry Boyle (1669–1725), later 1st Baron Carleton.
- Hon. Arabella Boyle (c. 1671–1750), married Henry Petty, 1st Earl of Shelburne.

After the death of his wife Jane in 1679, Charles married Lady Arethusa Berkeley (1664–1743), daughter of George Berkeley, 1st Earl of Berkeley and Elizabeth Massingberd, in 1688, and they had one child:

- Hon. Arethusa Boyle (1688–?), married James Vernon.

Charles Boyle died on 12 October 1694.

Parliament of England
Preceded by John Swinfen and John Ferrers	Member of Parliament for Tamworth; 1670–1679; With: John Swinfen	Succeeded by John Swinfen and Thomas Thynne
Preceded by Conyers Darcy and Sir Thomas Slingsby, Bt.	Member of Parliament for Yorkshire; 1679–1689; With: The Lord Fairfax of Cameron 1679–1685, Sir John Kaye, Bt. from 1685	Succeeded by Sir John Kaye, Bt. and The Lord Fairfax of Cameron
Peerage of Ireland
Preceded by Richard Boyle	Viscount Dungarvan (writ of acceleration); 1663–1694	Succeeded by Charles Boyle
Peerage of England
Preceded by Richard Boyle	Baron Clifford of Lanesborough (writ of acceleration); 1689–1694	Succeeded by Charles Boyle
Preceded by Elizabeth Boyle	Baron Clifford; 1691–1694	Succeeded by Charles Boyle
