= Richard Boyle, 1st Earl of Cork =

English politician (1566–1643)

The Earl of Cork
- 1st Earl of Cork
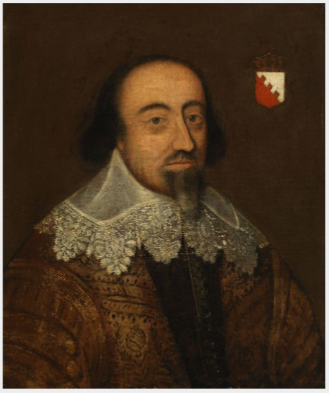
- The 1st Earl of Cork
- Tenure: 1629–1643
- Other titles: Lord Treasurer of the Kingdom of Ireland
- Known for: Plantations of Ireland
- Born: 13 October 1566; Canterbury, Kent, England
- Died: 15 September 1643 (aged 76)

Richard Boyle, 1st Earl of Cork (13 October 1566 – 15 September 1643), also known as 'the Great Earl of Cork', was an English politician who served as Lord Treasurer of the Kingdom of Ireland.

Lord Cork was an important figure in the continuing English colonisation of Ireland in the 16th and 17th centuries, as he acquired large tracts of land in plantations in Munster in southern Ireland. Moreover, his sons played an important role in fighting against the Irish Catholic rebellion in the 1640s and 1650s, assisting in the victory of the British and Protestant interests in Ireland.

In addition to being the first Earl of Cork, he was the patriarch of the Boyle family through his many prominent descendants, whose titles included Earl of Orrery (1660), Earl of Burlington (1664) and Earl of Shannon (1756).

== Early life ==
Boyle was born at Canterbury on 13 October 1566, the second son of Roger Boyle (d. 24 March 1576 at Preston, near Faversham in Kent), a descendant of an ancient landed Herefordshire family, and of Joan (15 October 1529 –20 March 1586), daughter of John Naylor, who were married in Canterbury on 16 October 1564. Both his parents are interred in an alabaster tomb at the upper end of the chancel of the parish church of Preston. His elder brother was John Boyle, Bishop of Cork, Cloyne and Ross.

Young Boyle went to The King's School, Canterbury, at the same time as Christopher Marlowe. His university education began at Bennet (Corpus Christi) College, Cambridge, England, in 1583. After this he studied law at the Middle Temple in London and became a clerk to Sir Roger Manwood, Kt., who was then the Lord Chief Baron of the Exchequer.

Before completing his studies, Boyle decided "to gain learning, knowledge, and experience abroad in the world" and left London for a new start in Ireland. He arrived in Dublin on 23 June 1588 with just over £27 (equivalent to £9,342 in 2025),as well as a gold bracelet worth £10 (£3,460 in 2025), and a diamond ring (given to him by his mother at her death and which he wore all his life), besides some fine clothing, and his "rapier and dagger".

In 1590 he obtained the appointment of deputy Escheator to John Crofton, the Escheator-General.

=== Joan Apsley ===
On 6 November 1595, Boyle married Joan Apsley (1578 – 14 December 1599), the daughter and co-heiress of William Apsley of Limerick, one of the council to the first President of the province of Munster.

Apsley was the heiress of lands in Galbally, with a fortune greater than that of Richard Boyle. Joan was said to have been "charmed by Mr. Boyle's conversation," and her father allowed them to marry. She married Boyle at Limerick on 6 November 1595, she being 17 and he 28. This marriage brought her husband an estate worth £500 a year, "the beginning and foundation of my fortune", (equivalent to £122,969 in 2025), which he continued to receive until at least 1632.

She died during childbirth aged 21 in Mallow, Ireland and was buried with her still-born son in Buttevant church, County Cork, Ireland. Boyle's detractors maintained that unlike many of his other close relatives whom he took great care to commemorate, Richard took no trouble to have Joan, his first wife commemorated after her death. Boyle commemorated Joan in the south chapel, known as the Chantry of our Blessed Saviour, of St. Mary's Collegiate Church in Youghal, which he purchased in 1606 to make it into a mortuary chapel for his family. This tomb, completed in 1619, depicts Joan kneeling at her husband's feet dressed in "a richly brocaded purple gown." This led to the conviction among some that his monumental commemorative endeavours were motivated by how they could help achieve his personal objectives, rather than sentimental, as Joan's connections were of no direct use to him after her death.

His strongest commemoration of Joan might be in the name he gave his fourth daughter but this may of course have been given in memory of his mother.

== Political career ==
Boyle by this time had been the object of the attacks of Sir Henry Wallop, Treasurer at War, Sir Robert Gardiner, Lord Chief Justice of Ireland, Sir Robert Dillon, Chief Justice of the Irish Common Pleas, and Sir Richard Bingham, Chief Commissioner of Connaught, a demonstration, said Boyle, of their envy of his success and increasing prosperity.

Boyle was arrested on charges of fraud and collusion with the Spanish (essentially accusations of covert papist infiltration, a treasonable offence for an official in Queen Elizabeth I's Protestant civil service) in his office. He was thrown into prison (at least once by Sir William FitzWilliam in about 1592) several times during this episode. He was about to leave for England to justify himself to Queen Elizabeth I, when there was a rebellion in Munster in October 1598, and "all my lands were wasted" which once again returned him to poverty. The Nine Years' War arrived in Munster with Irish rebels from Ulster, who were joined by locals who had lost land to English settlers. Boyle was forced to flee to Cork for safety.

This turn of events left him obliged to return to London and his chambers at The Temple. At this point, he was almost immediately taken into the service of Robert Devereux, 2nd Earl of Essex.

Henry Wallop then renewed his prosecution of Boyle. Boyle was summoned to appear at the Court of Star Chamber. In the proceedings, Boyle's adversaries seem to have failed to substantiate their accusations. Boyle had somehow managed to secure the attendance of Queen Elizabeth I herself at the proceedings, and he successfully exposed some misconduct on the part of his adversaries.

Elizabeth famously said: "By God's death, these are but inventions against the young man" and she also said he was "a man fit to be employed by ourselves".

He was immediately appointed Clerk of the Council of Munster by Elizabeth I in 1600. In December 1601, Boyle brought to Elizabeth the news of the victory near Kinsale.

In October 1602, Boyle was again sent over by Sir George Carew, the president of Munster, on Irish affairs. He was knighted at St Mary's Abbey, near Dublin, by Carew on 25 July 1603. the same day that he married his second wife, Catherine, daughter of Sir Geoffrey Fenton, Principal Secretary of State. In 1606 he was appointed as Privy Councillor for Munster and in 1612 as Privy Councillor for Ireland.

== Acquisition of property, rank, and titles ==
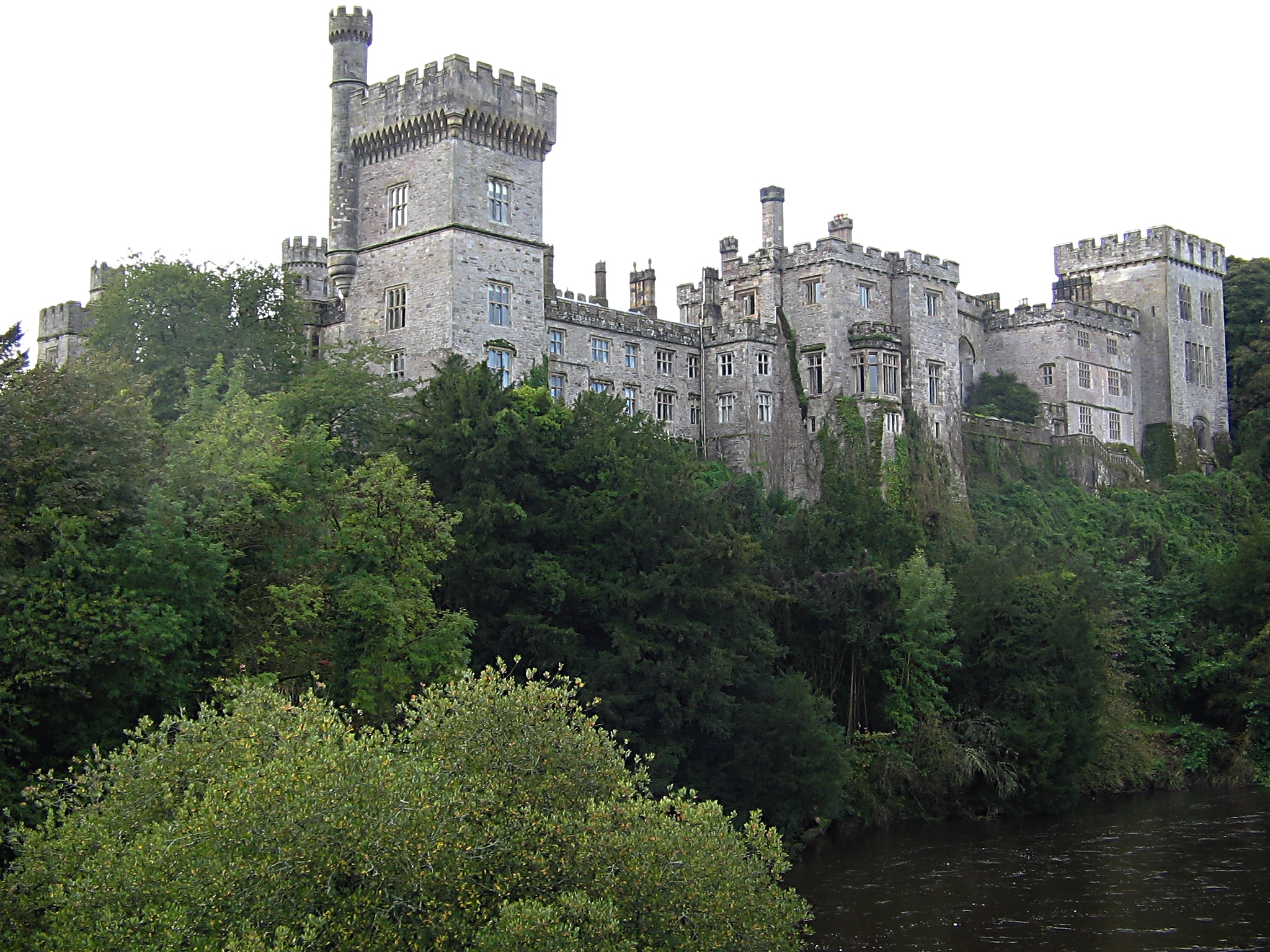
Lismore Castle, County Waterford

In 1602, Richard Boyle bought Sir Walter Raleigh's estates of 42,000 acres (170 km^{2}) for £1,500 (£406,510 in 2025) in the counties of Cork (including Myrtle Grove), Waterford (including Lismore Castle) and Tipperary. He made these purchases on the insistence of Sir George Carew. Boyle made Lismore Castle his chief country abode after purchasing it and turned it into a magnificent residence with impressive gabled ranges on each side of the courtyard. He also built a crenellated outer wall and a gatehouse known as the Riding Gate for the castle. The principal apartments of the castle were decorated with fretwork plaster ceilings, tapestry hangings, embroidered silks, and velvet. Boyle also had a substantial residence at Youghal, besides Myrtle Grove, known today as "The College", close to the Collegiate Church of St Mary Youghal. Order on the Boyle estates was maintained in 13 castles which were garrisoned by retainers. The town of Clonakilty was formally founded in 1613 by him when he received a charter from King James I of England.

Boyle was then returned as a burgh commissioner (Member of Parliament) for Lismore in the Irish Parliament of 1614, (held at Dublin Castle) on 18 May 1614. He ascended to the Irish Peerage as Lord Boyle, Baron of Youghal on 6 September 1616.

Lord Boyle claimed to have built the town of Bandon in County Cork, but in fact, the town was planned and built by Henry Beecher, John Archdeacon, and William Newce. The land on which Bandon was built had been granted by Queen Elizabeth I to Phane Beecher in 1586, and inherited by his eldest son Henry who then sold it to Boyle in November 1618. In Bandon, Boyle founded iron-smelting and linen-weaving industries and brought in English settlers, many from Bristol.

Lord Boyle was created Earl of Cork and Viscount Dungarvan on 26 October 1620. He then occupied the office of Sheriff from 1625 to 1626. On 26 October 1629, he was appointed as a Lord Justice, and on 9 November 1631, he became the Lord Treasurer of Ireland. Although he was not a Peer in the English Parliament, it is nonetheless recorded that he was "by writ called into the Upper House by His Majesty's great grace", and he subsequently took up the honoured position of an "assistant sitting on the inside of the Woolsack."

Oliver Cromwell is reported to have said of Lord Cork 'If there had been an Earl of Cork in every province, it would have been impossible for the Irish to have raised a rebellion.' One of Lord Cork's major political allies during the era was Piers Crosby.

It is a mistake to see Lord Cork's 'empire' as merely being exclusively confined to the development of the 'Raleigh estates': for instance, his acquisition of the entirety of the town of Bandon was not completed until 1625. Other towns which also form part of Lord Cork's municipal development legacy (which records employment of over 4,000 people during his lifetime) include Midleton, Castlemartyr, Charleville and Doneraile.

By 1636, Lord Cork had opted to live in the West Country to see out the rest of his days. He purchased from The 3rd Earl of Castlehaven, for £5,000, the manor of Stalbridge in Dorset which became his English seat, and in 1637, he laid out a further £20,000 for Temple Coombe Manor, close by in Somerset. Lord Cork, at the insistence of the Howards, also bought Annery House near Bideford in 1640 for £5000. The Earl was most delighted with Annery House and the living that came with the estate; he was also delighted that he could easily travel to Youghal from Bideford. Annery House was left to his sixth son Francis Boyle upon his death in 1643. Lord Cork had also been left the manor of Salcombe in Devon by his friend Thomas Stafford, the illegitimate son of George Carew, 1st Earl of Totnes. Salcombe, along with Halberton Manor, was also left to his son Francis and his wife Elizabeth Killigrew.

== Boyle's adversaries ==
The Great Earl's most famous enemy was Thomas Wentworth, 1st Earl of Strafford. Strafford arrived in Ireland in 1633 as Lord Deputy, and at first successfully deprived Boyle of much of his privilege and income. Boyle patiently husbanded forces in opposition to Strafford's Irish program and this successful political manoeuvering by Boyle was an important factor in Strafford's demise. It may be said in defence of Boyle that he would have been quite prepared to work amicably with Strafford, had Strafford not quickly made it clear that he saw Boyle as an "over-mighty subject", whose power must be curbed, if not crushed entirely. Boyle initially made friendly overtures, and tried to establish a family link by marrying his eldest son Richard to Elizabeth Clifford, a niece of Strafford's first wife, but soon abandoned any hope of an amicable relationship.

An illuminating example of the humiliations to which Wentworth subjected Boyle, was the instance where he forced Boyle to remove his wife's tomb from the choir in St Patrick's Cathedral, Dublin. He was also prosecuted in the Court of Castle Chamber, the Irish equivalent of Star Chamber, for alleged misappropriation of the funds of Youghal College.

Archbishop William Laud delighted in Wentworth's attacks on Boyle and wrote: "No physic better than a vomit if it be given in time, and therefore you have taken a very judicious course to administer one so early to my Lord of Cork. I hope it will do him good".

Laud and Wentworth shared, with King Charles I, the same fate as many others, who at some time in their lives, found reasons to conspire against Boyle: an early demise. With Boyle showing his customary astuteness by putting on a convincing show of politically appropriate response at every crucial juncture. His one serious miscalculation was his failure to anticipate the Irish Rebellion of 1641.

Boyle made an entry concerning Wentworth in his diary: "A most cursed man to all Ireland and to me in particular".

At Wentworth's trial, Boyle was a key witness, but he did not take any other direct part in the prosecution itself. Unsurprisingly, he was in full support of the condemnation of Wentworth and wholeheartedly approved of his execution: he made a grim entry in his diary: "Lord Strafford was beheaded on the Tower Hill, as he well deserved".

From his children, Boyle expected obedience, although he was a genuinely affectionate father, and far more forgiving of opposition from them than from his political enemies. Lady Mary, "my unruly daughter" angered her father by refusing to marry Lord Clanbrassil on the rather modern ground that she found him repulsive, and again by marrying the future Earl of Warwick, who was then a penniless younger son, against her father's wishes; but they were soon reconciled and he furnished her with a generous dowry.

Boyle died at Youghal in September 1643, having been chased off his lands in the Irish Rebellion of 1641. His sons, however, recovered the family estates after the suppression of the rebellion. Boyle's tomb is in Youghal's St Mary's Collegiate Church.

== Boyle's "philosophical" legacy ==
Lord Cork has been described as the "first colonial millionaire".

Historian Roy Foster, in his Modern Ireland, calls him an 'epitome of Elizabethan adventurer-colonist in Ireland'.

The Boyle motto is: 'God's Providence is my inheritance'.

Lord Cork's theopolitical philosophy has been described as 'providentialist' when contrasted with its counterpart which prevailed to the north in parts of Ulster at the time, which is more typically characterised as Presbyterian.

Such a comparison of these two standpoints is neither exclusively religious nor secular, a factor which perhaps offers some small insight as to how Lord Cork managed to achieve what seems now the extraordinary feat of gaining strong favour at various times with the leaders on either side of the English Civil War.

== Issue ==
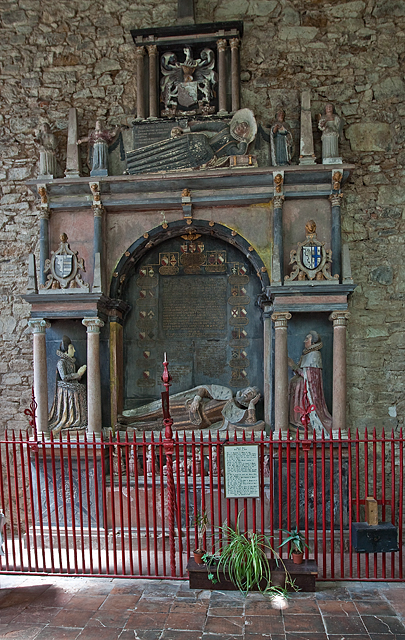
Tomb in St Mary's Collegiate church, Youghal

By his second wife, Catherine Fenton, daughter of Sir Geoffrey Fenton and his wife Alice Weston, the 1st Earl of Cork had fifteen children:

- Roger Boyle (1 August 1606, Youghal, County Cork, Ireland–10 October 1615, Deptford, Kent, England, where he was buried).
- Lady Alice Boyle (1607–1667), married David Barry, 1st Earl of Barrymore, then after his death, married John Barry, of Liscarroll, co Cork, Ireland.
- Lady Sarah Boyle (1609–1633), married Sir Thomas Moore, then after his death married Robert Digby, 1st Baron Digby.
- Lady Lettice Boyle (1610–1657), married Colonel George Goring, Lord Goring.
- Lady Joan Boyle (1611–1657), married George FitzGerald, 16th Earl of Kildare ("the Fairy Earl").
- Richard Boyle, 2nd Earl of Cork and 1st Earl of Burlington (1612–1698), Lord High Treasurer of Ireland (1660–1695).
- Lady Katherine Boyle (1615–1691), married Arthur Jones, 2nd Viscount Ranelagh.
- Hon. Geoffrey Boyle
- Lady Dorothy Boyle, married Sir Arthur Loftus of Rathfarnham and was the mother of Adam Loftus, 1st Viscount Lisburne.
- Lewis Boyle, 1st Viscount Boyle of Kinalmeaky (1619–1642), succeeded under special remainder by his older brother Richard.
- Roger Boyle, 1st Earl of Orrery (1621–1679)
- Francis Boyle, 1st Viscount Shannon
- Lady Mary Boyle, married Charles Rich, 4th Earl of Warwick.
- Hon. Robert Boyle (1627–1691), author of The Sceptical Chymist; considered to be the father of modern chemistry.
- Lady Margaret Boyle

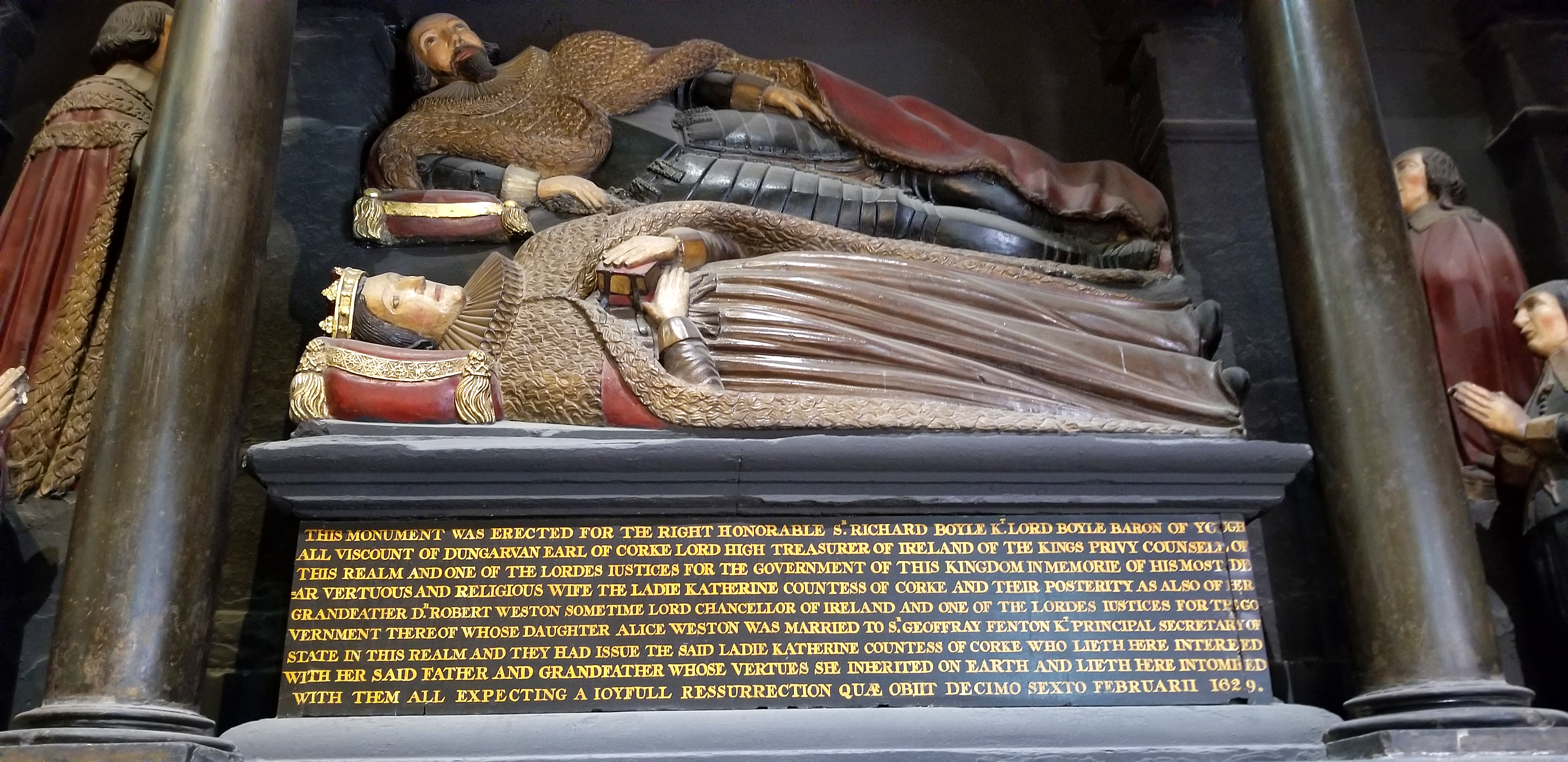
Boyle's Monument in St. Patrick's Cathedral

Boyle erected an elaborate monument to himself, his wives, his mother, and his children in The Collegiate Church of St Mary Youghal, County Cork and there is a similar but much larger Boyle monument in St Patrick's Cathedral, Dublin. His elder brother John is also buried in the tomb.

== Notes ==
Peerage of Ireland
New creation	Earl of Cork; 1620–1643	Succeeded by Richard Boyle
