= Lysaght =

Lysaght may refer to:

== People ==
- John Lysaght, 1st Baron Lisle (1702–1781)
- John Lysaght, 2nd Baron Lisle (1729–)
- Edward Lysaght (1763–1811), Irish songwriter
- Sidney Royse Lysaght (1856–1941), Irish poet
- John Lysaght (1832–1895), manufacturer of sheet iron
- Averil Lysaght (1905–1981), New Zealand biologist, science historian and artist
- Muriel Lysaght (1917–2005), New Zealand landscape architect
- Sophia Augusta Lysaght (1861-1945), New Zealand artist
- Cornelius Lysaght (b. 1965), British horse-racing correspondent

== Businesses ==
- John Lysaght (company), British iron and steel company
- Lysaght, Australian steel company

== Places ==
- Mount Lysaght
- Another spelling of Lysite, Wyoming

== See also ==
- MacLysaght
