= Clarks Wood Company warehouse =

Building in Bristol, England

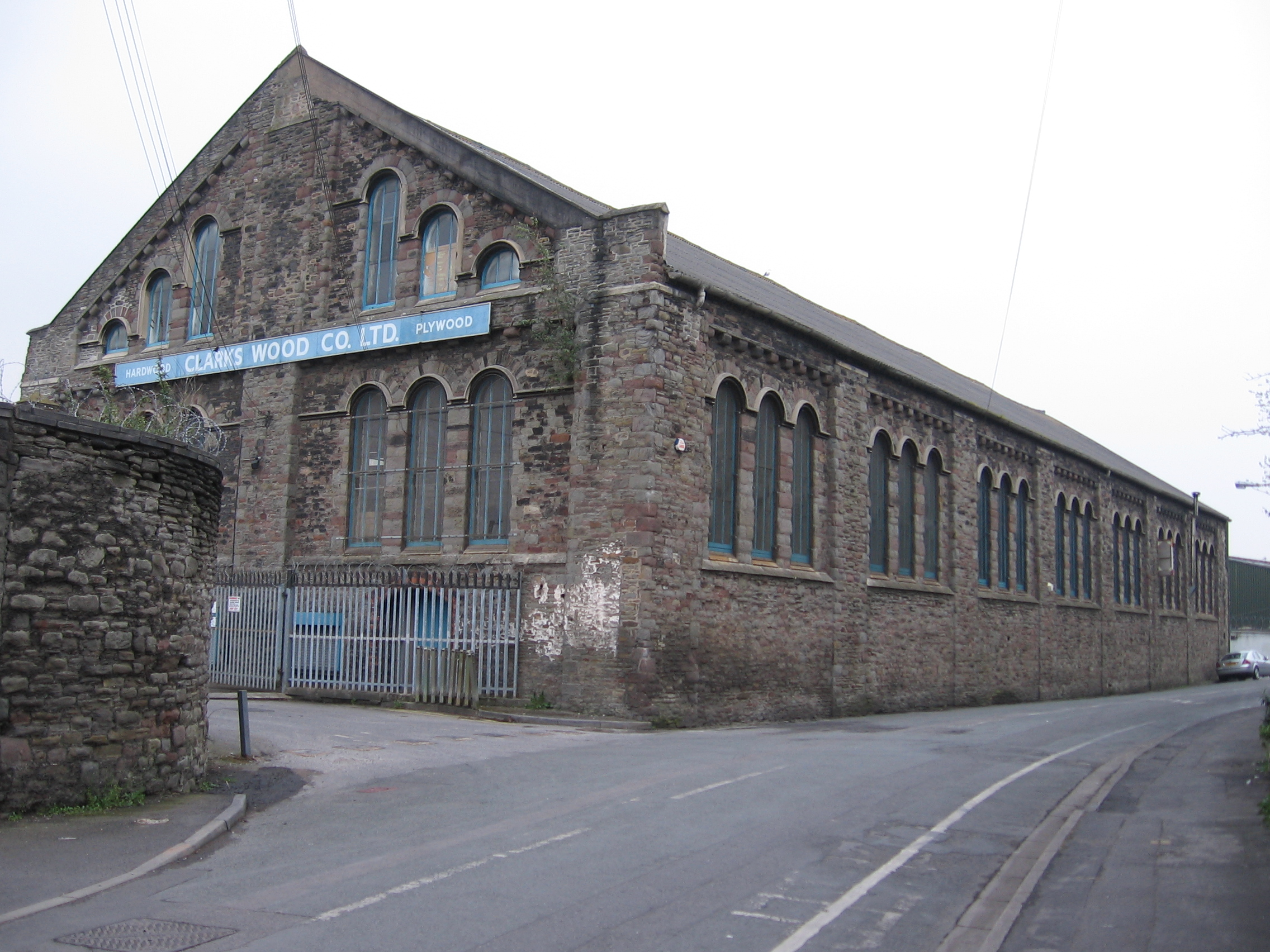

- Location within Bristol

General information
- Location: Bristol, England
- Coordinates: 51.4509°N 2.5695°W
- Completed: c 1863
- Client: John Lysaght

Design and construction
- Architect: Possibly Thomas Royse Lysaght

The Clarks Wood Company warehouse is a 19th-century industrial building in Silverthorne Lane, Bristol.

It dates from about 1863, but only two of its original walls remain. It is known to have been used early in its history as a railhead warehouse for William Butler's tar works at nearby Crew's Hole, and later became part of St Vincent's Works.

It is an example of the Bristol Byzantine style of architecture, and has been listed by English Heritage as a grade II listed building.
