= Plastic Dog Agency =

Plastic Dog
- Company type: Private
- Industry: Musical promotion and booking
- Founded: UK (1968)
- Defunct: (1977)
- Headquarters: Bristol, UK
- Number of employees: 5

Plastic Dog (also known as Park Street Associates) was a company formed in Bristol by people affiliated with the music venues Dugout on Park Row and later the Granary nightclub. Formed by musicians, the group aimed to use their creative talents to create a bustling musical network in Bristol.

== History ==
Al Read and Terry Brace were school friends who had experience playing music (Read guitar and Brace bass). Al had organised Skiffle nights at the Beeches club in Filton, Bristol in the late 50s.

In 1966 When Read joined a band called the Franklyn Big Six, he sent a letter to Brace inviting him to join the band. They soon left this band to join Picture of Dorian Gray, which became renamed East Of Eden. Geoff Nicholson soon joined East of Eden and Ed Newshom, the roadie from Nicholson's last band The Kingbees followed.

This line-up of East of Eden released a single called King Of Siam in 1968. East of Eden hired the Dugout club. In a newspaper advertisement for this club night their saxophonist Ron Caines suggested "if it's raining, don't forget your plastic dog coats", which inspired their title. Al and Terry left East of Eden but continued the club nights, choosing to promote local bands.

Here they linked up with Mike Tobin. He had been involved with Read's skiffle nights as a performer in the late 50s and they had stayed in touch ever since. When he joined the Plastic Dog collective had become a loose collective of creative people. Around this time Newshom had stopped being East of Eden's roadie and joined Plastic Dog too.

Tobin approached the Granary Jazz club to find a bigger venue for the Plastic Dog nights and they started organising gigs on Monday nights. Now Plastic Dog had an entertainments agency licence, developed a graphics studio and set up offices at 77 Park Street.

Plastic Dog became full time promoters of rock music at the Granary and other venues.

In 1971 Plastic Dog invested a lot of money into organising the “Midsummer Merrymaking" festival at Pleasure Acre, Portbury, Portishead scheduled for July 30. Communication with the local council resulted in a late switch of venues, the company lacked the time or funding to promote this change and on top of this bad weather made the festival unworkable. Plastic Dog struggled to recover from the resulting loss of funds and the company began to fragment.

Comedian Jasper Carrot expressed an interest in signing with Plastic Dog Agency at a meeting on May 30, 1974.

Early in 1977 Plastic Dog (Park Street Associates) was sold to Derek Barker and Adrian Squires at Rainbow Entertainments who were based at Queen Square, Bristol. Read moved his office to The Granary club and focused on booking bands and radio presentation.

== Legacy ==
The agency published a fanzine called Dogpress which ran for 35 monthly issues until December 1971. Throughout its run it had incorporated the talents of many famous contributors including illustrator Rodney Matthews. The team that ran this publication became Plastic Dog Graphics, a sister company to the Plastic Dog Agency. When they split from Plastic Dog following their financial problems in 1971 Plastic Dog Graphics became Skyline Studios. They had an office on Park Row in Bristol, designing album covers, posters and badges until they dissolved in 1976.

Throughout the Punk movement and then the NWOBHM the Granary remained a successful venue as like Plastic Dog the acts were booked by music fans for music fans.

On the 6th of April 1982 Al Read left the Granary following an incident with drug dealers, focusing instead on radio.

The surviving members of Plastic Dog still organise events in Bristol.
