= Lloyds Bank, Bristol =

Listed building in Bristol, England

Lloyds Bank
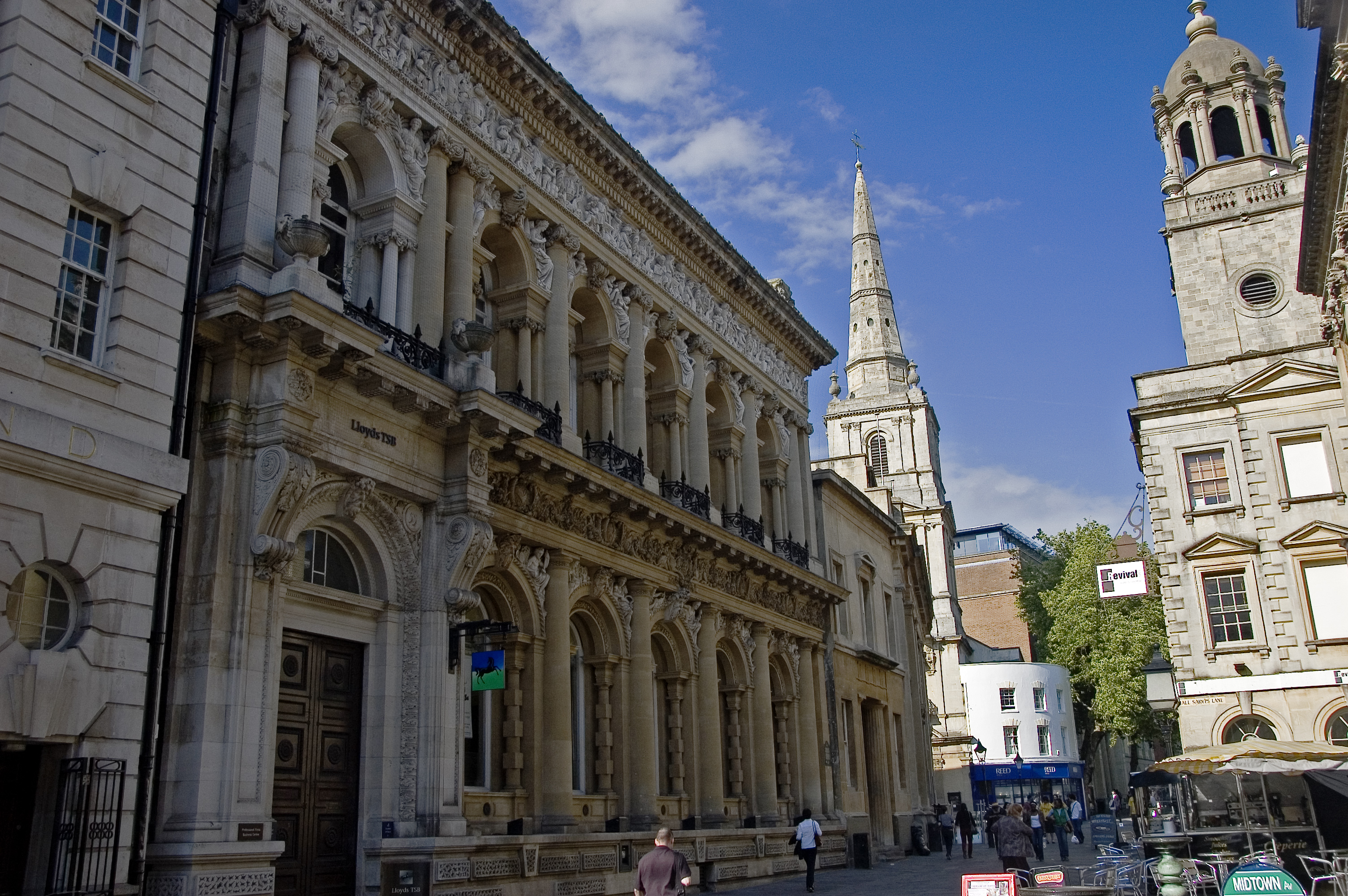
- Lloyds Bank in 2007

- Location within Bristol

General information
- Location: Corn Street, Bristol, England
- Coordinates: 51.4536°N 2.5958°W
- Year built: 1854–58

Design and construction
- Architects: William Bruce Gingell and T.R. Lysaght

Listed Building – Grade II*
- Official name: Lloyds Bank
- Designated: 8 January 1959
- Reference no.: 1187398

The Lloyds Bank (grid reference ST587729) is a historic building situated at 53 and 55 Corn Street in Bristol, England.

Originally the West of England and South Wales Bank built by Bristol architects William Bruce Gingell (1819–1899) and T.R. Lysaght in 1854. Gingell was one of the most progressive Bristol architects of the latter part of the 19th century. He went on to design the General Hospital. Gingell is said to have used St Mark's library in Venice as a starting point for this building. The sumptuous friezes by are by John Thomas (1813–1862). Thomas had been responsible for overseeing the carving on Charles Barry's new Houses of Parliament. On the ground floor the crests of Newport, Bath, Bristol, Exeter, and Cardiff are shown – the main towns from where the bank operated. On the first floor the 'elements and sources of wealth' are symbolised by life-size figures. They include: justice and integrity; education and charity; peace and plenty; art and science; commerce, navigation and commerce. Above this cherubs depict the activities of the bank: receiving, paying, storing, coining money, engraving and printing, and trading with Africa and America.

The adornment was intended to emphasise the wealth, and therefore financial stability, of the bank. It did not stop the bank going bust, however, 20 years later in 1878.

The opulent interior features Corinthian columns.

It is a Grade II* listed building and formerly housed a branch of the Lloyds Bank.

It is now a 42-room boutique hotel and luxury spa.

== See also ==
- Grade II* listed buildings in Bristol
