= Bristol Byzantine =

Byzantine Revival architecture in Bristol, England

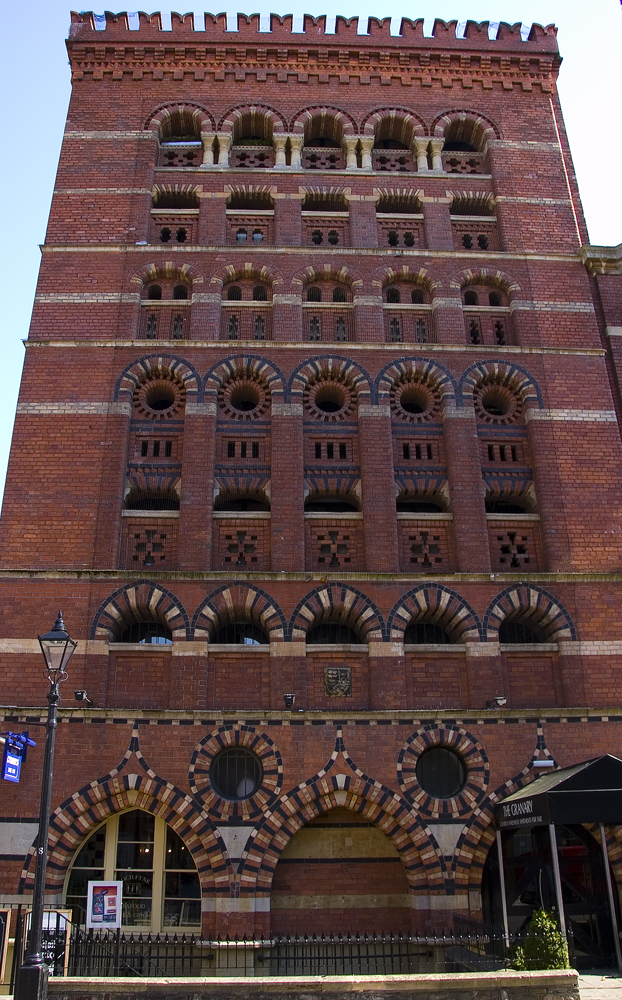
Granary, Bristol

Bristol Byzantine is a variety of Byzantine Revival architecture that was popular in the city of Bristol from about 1850 to 1880.

Many buildings in the style have been destroyed or demolished, but notable surviving examples include the Bristol Beacon, the Granary on Welsh Back, the Carriage Works on Stokes Croft and several of the buildings around Victoria Street. Several of the warehouses around the harbour have survived including the Arnolfini, which now houses an art gallery. Clarks Wood Company warehouse and the St Vincent's Works in Silverthorne Lane and the Wool Hall in St Thomas Street are other survivors from the 19th century.

== Style ==
Bristol Byzantine has influences from Byzantine and Moorish architecture applied mainly to industrial buildings such as warehouses and factories.

The style is characterised by a robust and simple outline, materials with character and coloured polychrome brickwork including red, yellow, black and white brick primarily from the Cattybrook Brickpit.

Several buildings included archways and upper floors unified through either horizontal or vertical grouping of window openings.

The first building with some of the characteristics generally thought of a Bristol Byzantine is Bush House, which is now known as the Arnolfini a 19th-century Grade II* listed tea warehouse situated on the side of the Floating Harbour in Bristol city centre. The architect was Richard Shackleton Pope, who constructed first the south part of the warehouse (1831) then extended it to the north in 1835–36. It has a rock-faced plinth, three storeys of rectangular windows recessed within tall round arches, and a shallow attic.

The style may have come about as a result of an acquaintance between William Venn Gough and Archibald Ponton, who designed the Granary and John Addington Symonds the Bristol-born historian of the Italian Renaissance. The term Bristol Byzantine is thought to have been invented by Sir John Summerson.

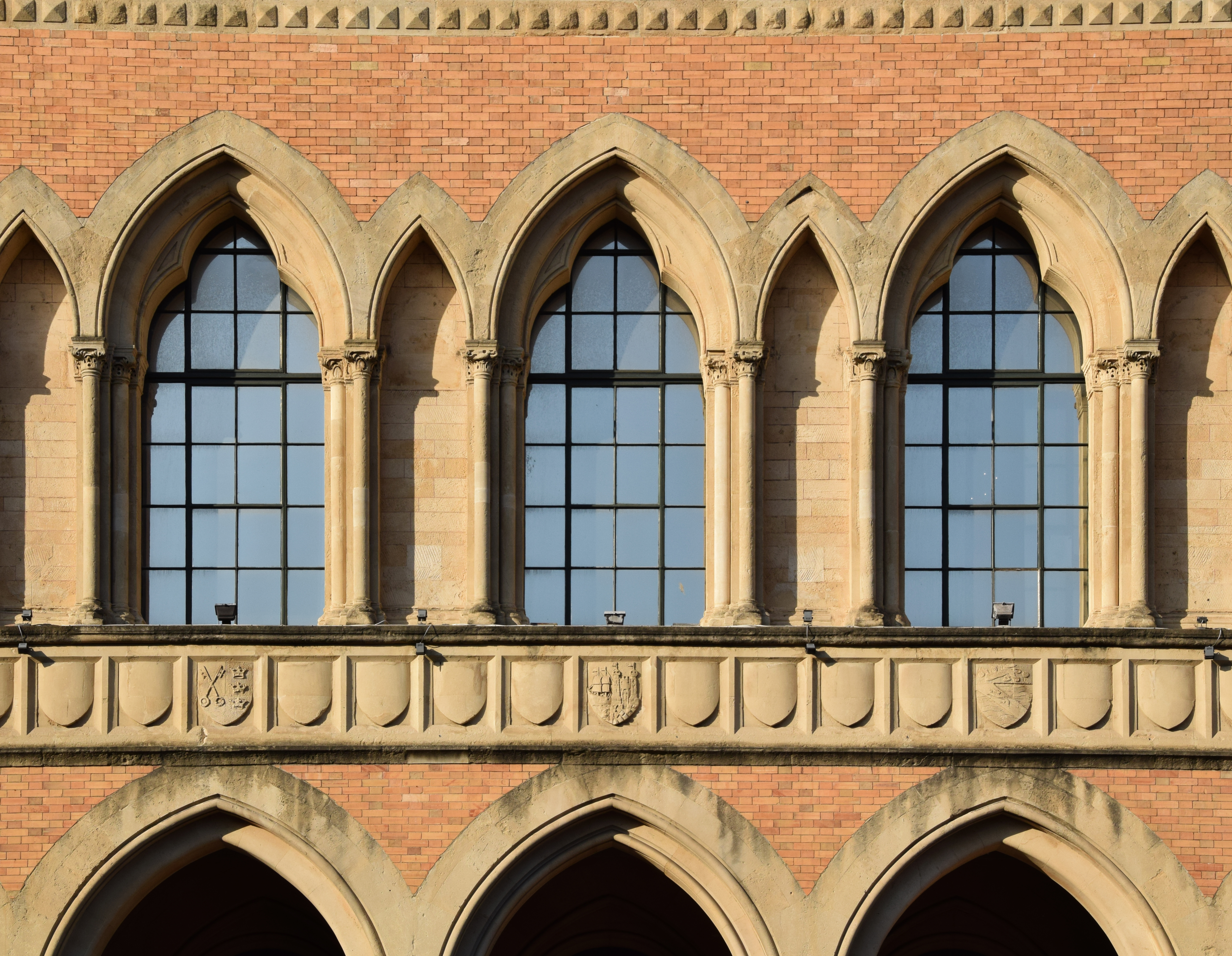
Browns Restaurant

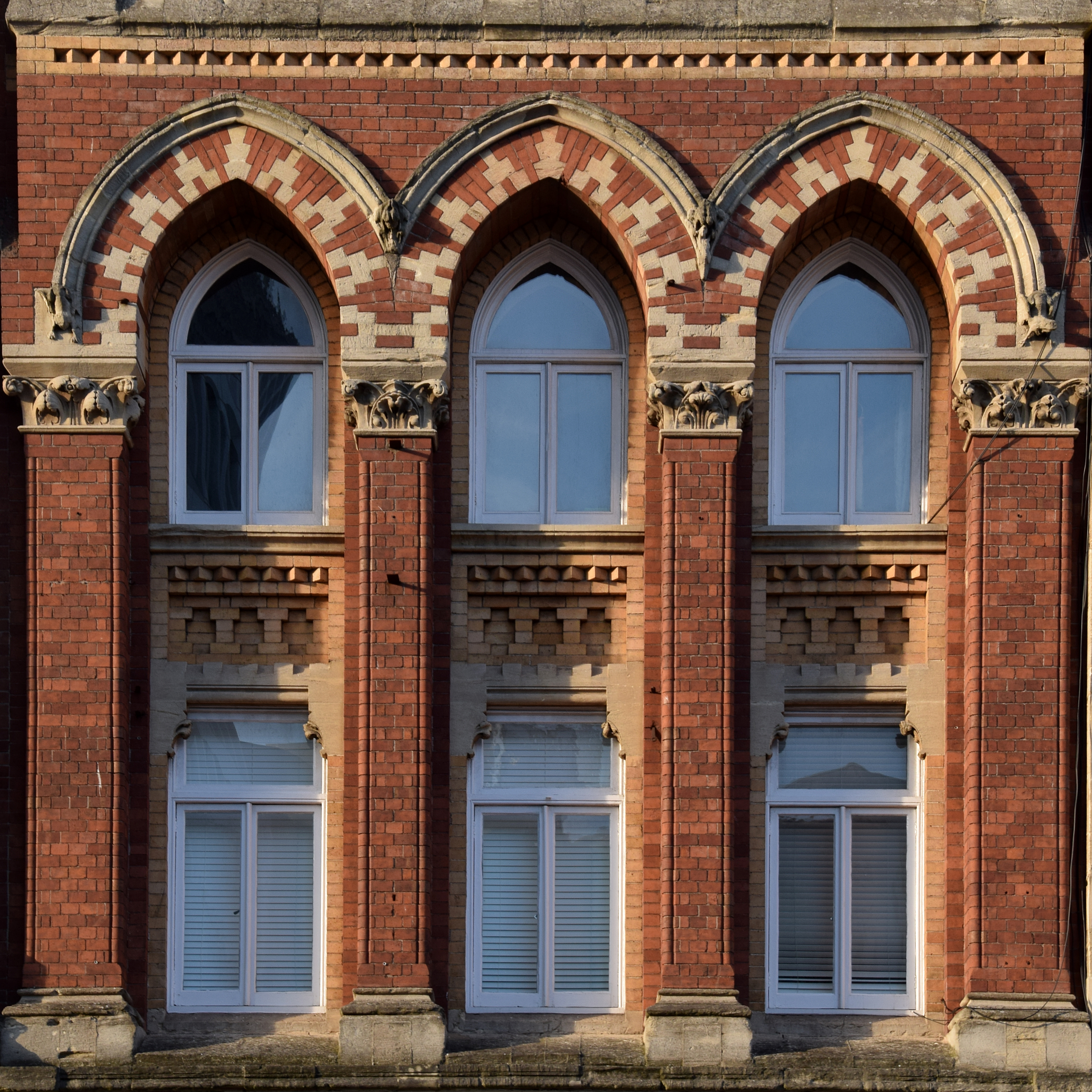
Victoria Court

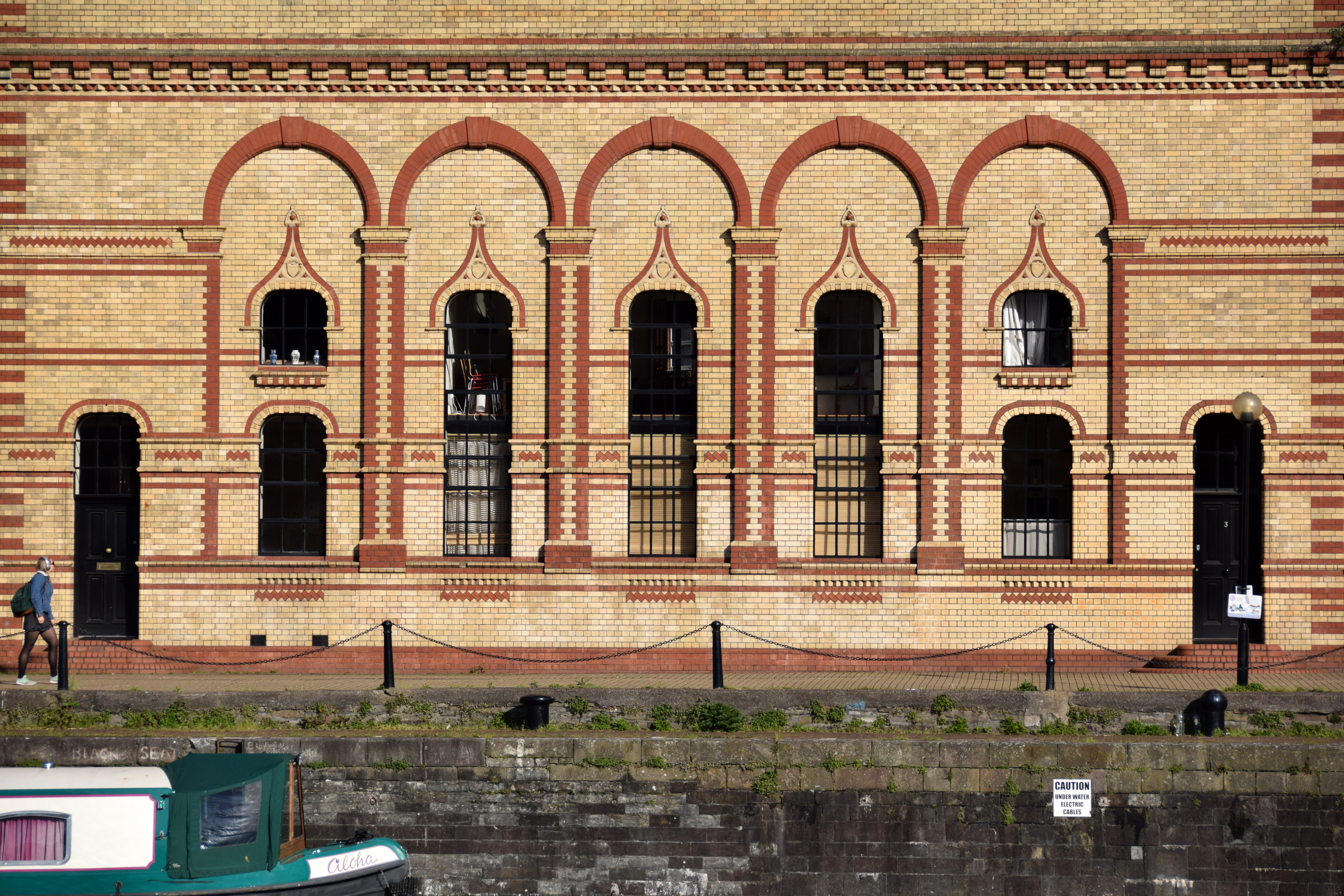
Robinsons Warehouse

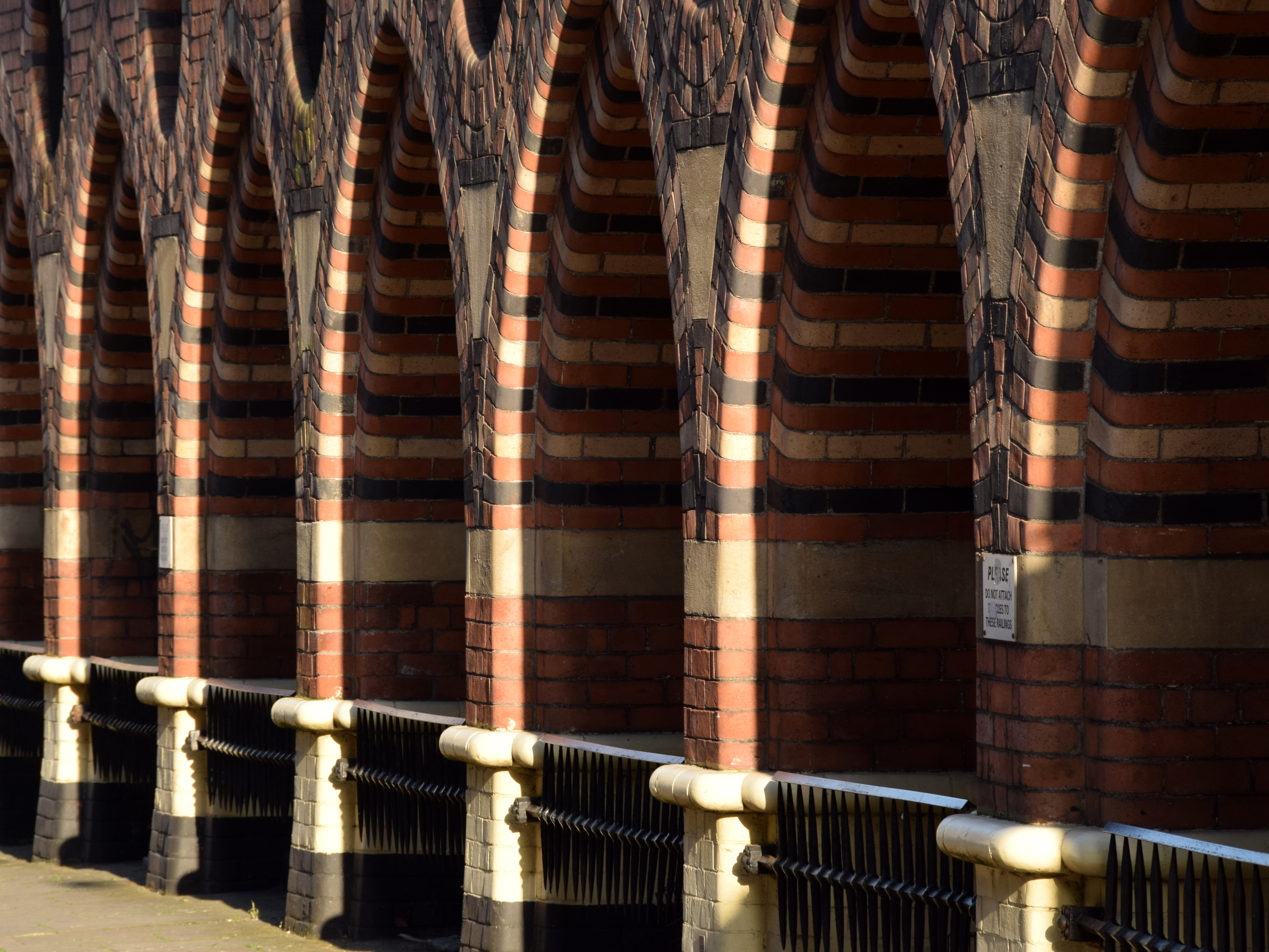
Granary

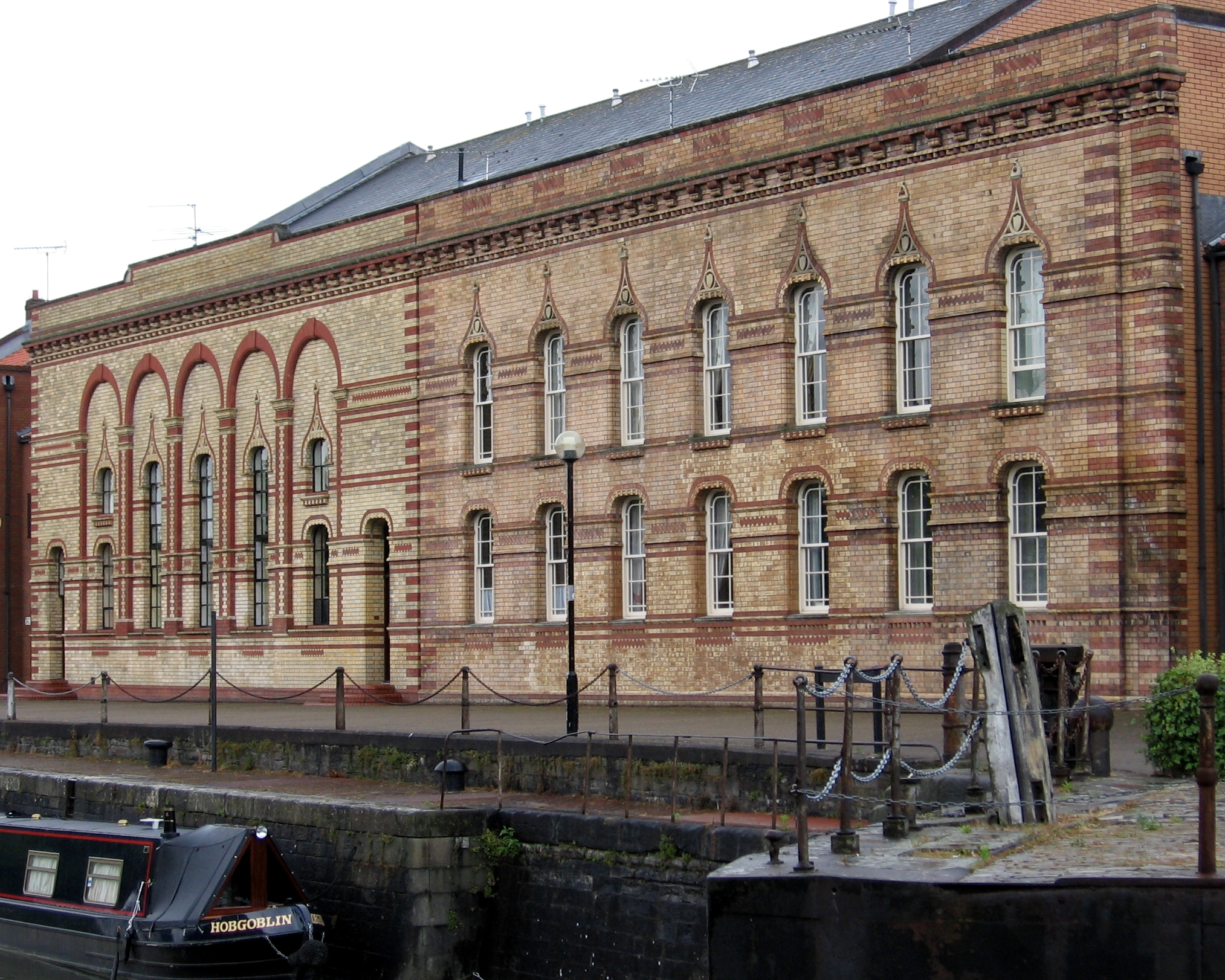
Robinson's Warehouse

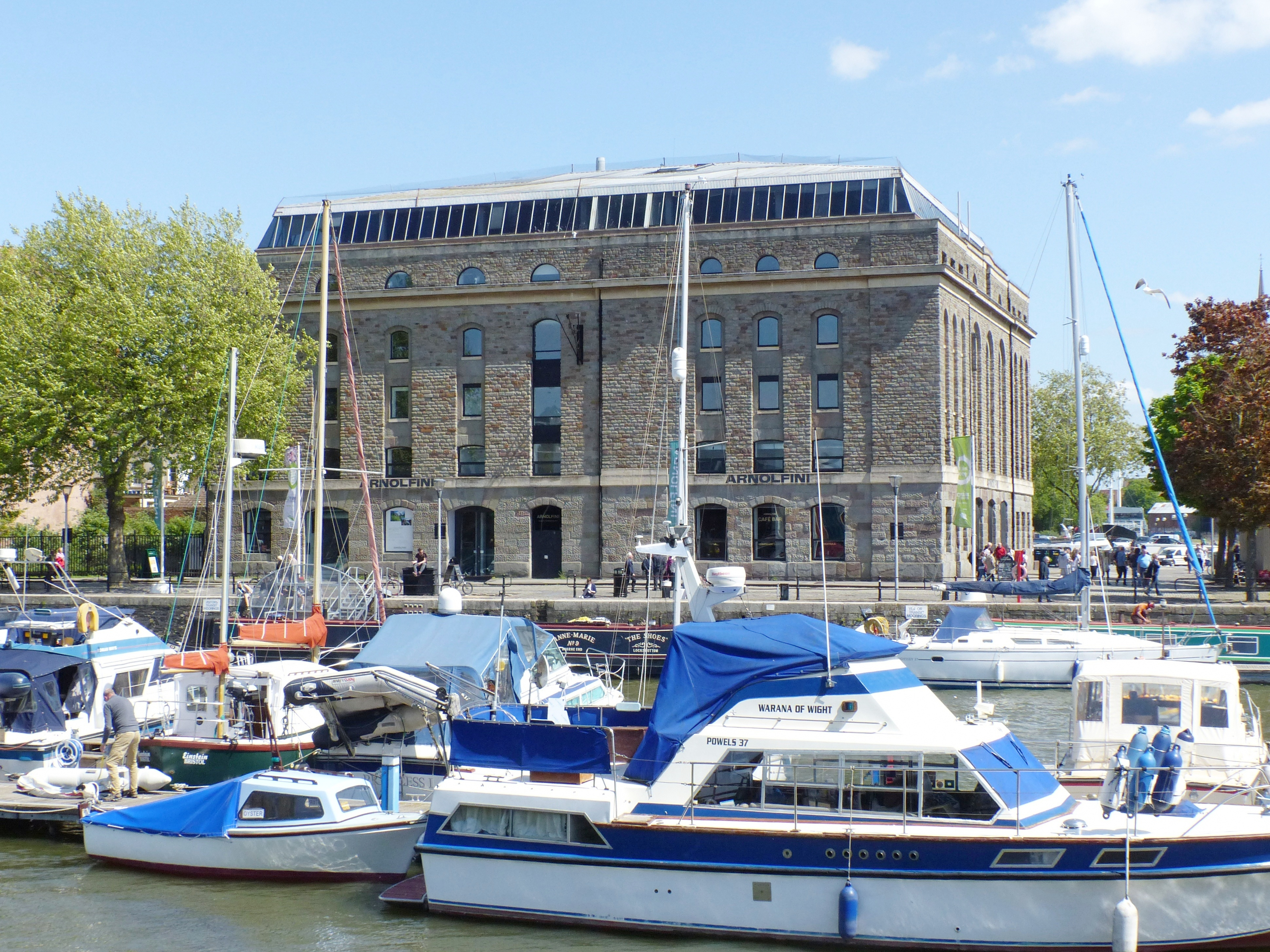
The Arnolfini arts centre, the first example of the Bristol Byzantine style.

== Architects ==
- R. Milverton Drake
- John Foster
- William Bruce Gingell
- Edward William Godwin
- William Venn Gough
- John Henry Hirst
- Thomas Royse Lysaght
- Archibald Ponton
- Richard Shackleton Pope

== Examples of buildings in the Byzantine architecture style ==
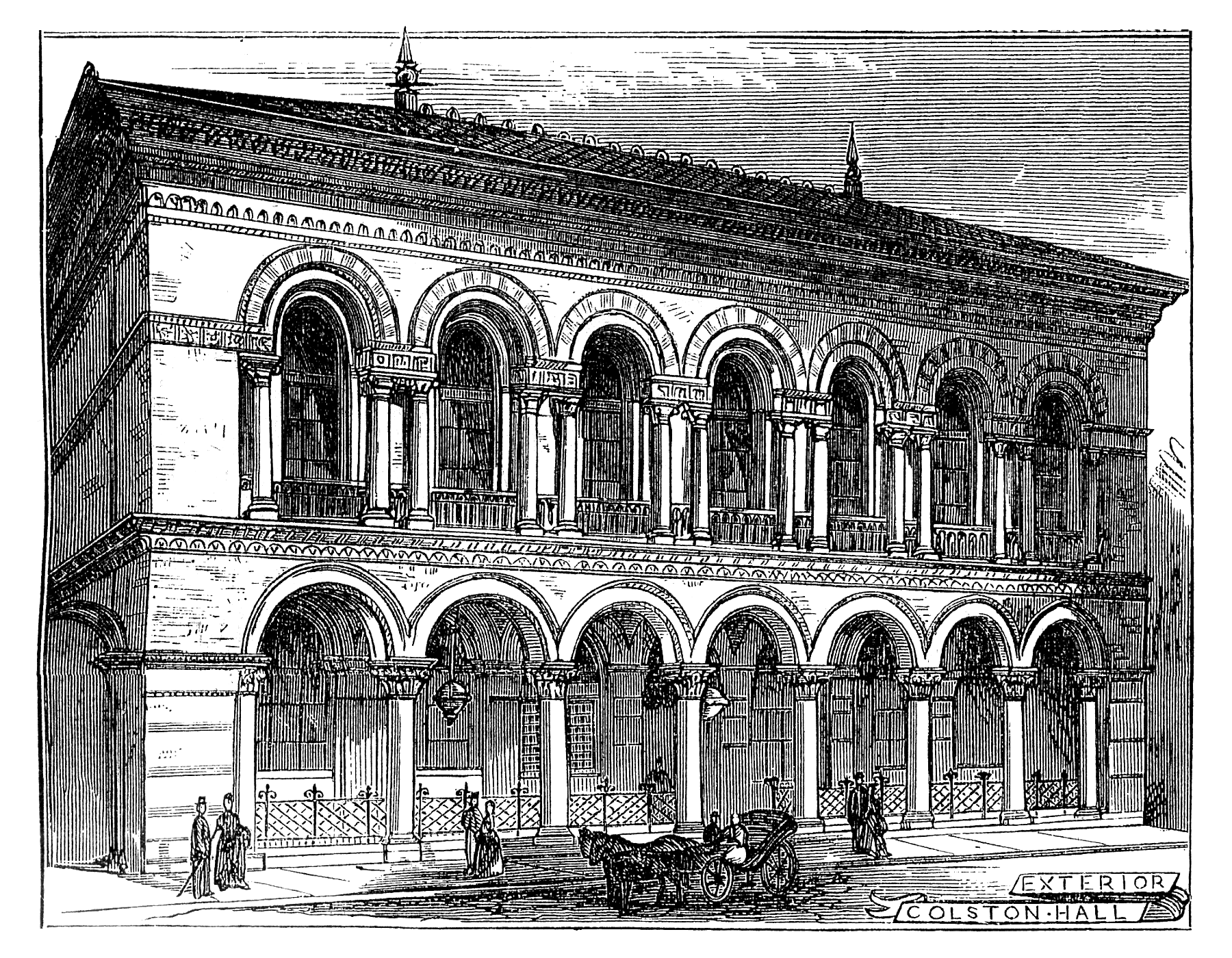
The Bristol Beacon, formerly Colston Hall, from an engraving

- 35 King Street (c. 1870)
- Bristol Beacon (1860s)
- Brown's Restaurant (1871)
- Carriage Works (1862)
- Clarks Wood Company warehouse (1863)
- Former Gardiners offices (1865–1867)
- Gardiners warehouse (1865)
- Granary, Bristol (1869)
- Robinson's Warehouse (1874)
- St Vincent's Works
- Warehouse premises of Hardware (Bristol) Limited (1882)
- Wool Hall, Bristol (1830)
- Arnolfini (1831)

== References in modern culture ==
- "Bristol Byzantine" is the name of a track by The Blue Aeroplanes on their 2006 album Altitude.

== See also ==
- Buildings and architecture of Bristol
