= Robinson's Warehouse, Bristol =

Building in Bristol, England

Robinson's Warehouse
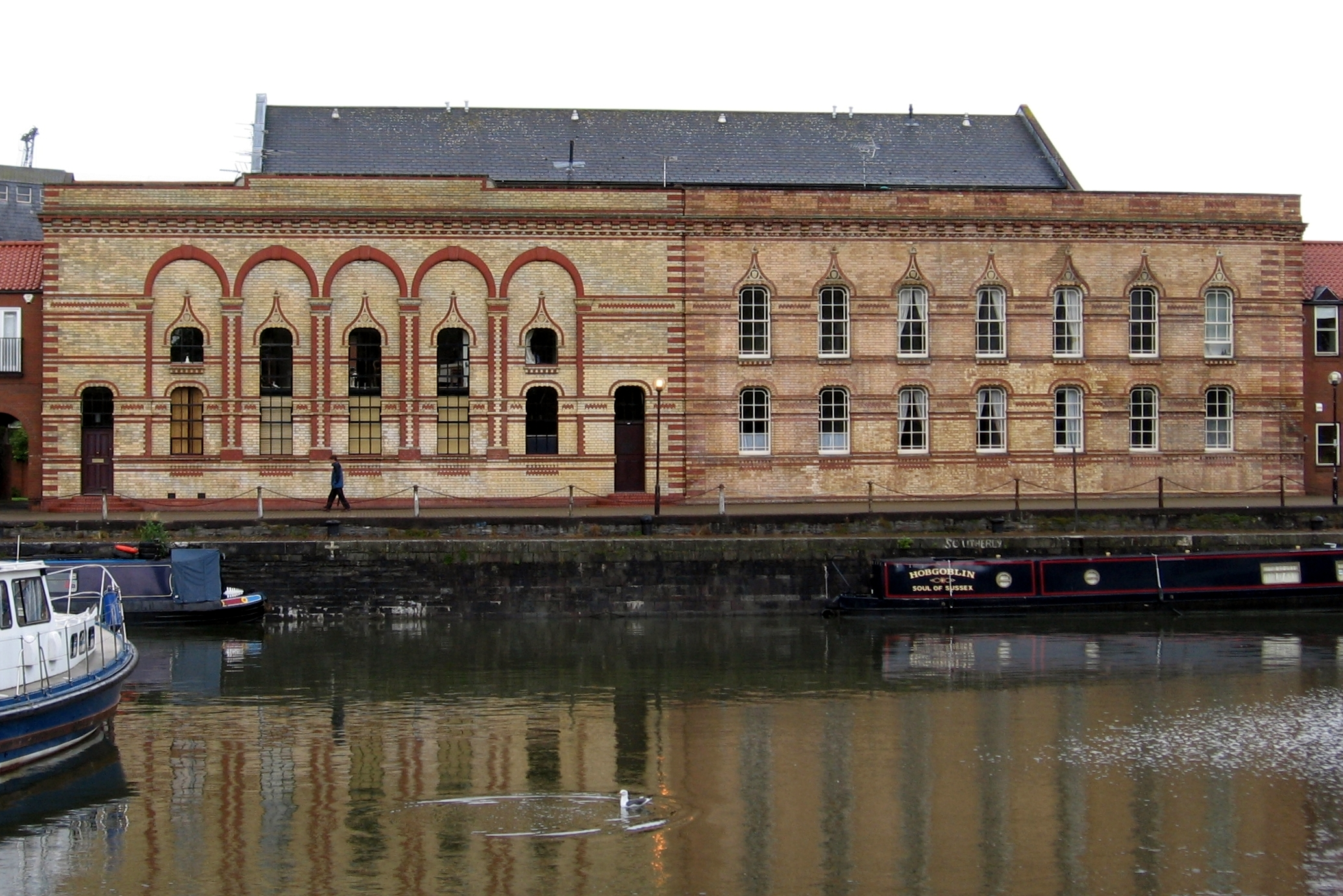

- Location within Bristol

General information
- Location: Bristol, England
- Coordinates: 51.4475°N 2.5951°W
- Completed: 1874

Robinson's Warehouse (grid reference ST585725) is an office building and former warehouse on Bathurst Parade, on the Floating Harbour in Bristol, England.

It was built in 1874 by William Bruce Gingell, and is an example of the Bristol Byzantine style with yellow and red brick and Moorish arches.

It was formerly the warehouse of Robinson's Oil Seed Manufactory, and has also been known as Warriner's Warehouse.

The interior was reconstructed in 1981 as offices, preserving the original exterior.

It has been designated by English Heritage as a grade II listed building.

== See also ==
- Media related to Robinson's Warehouse at Wikimedia Commons
- Grade II listed buildings in Bristol
