= Gardiners Warehouse =

Building in Bristol, England

Gardiners warehouse
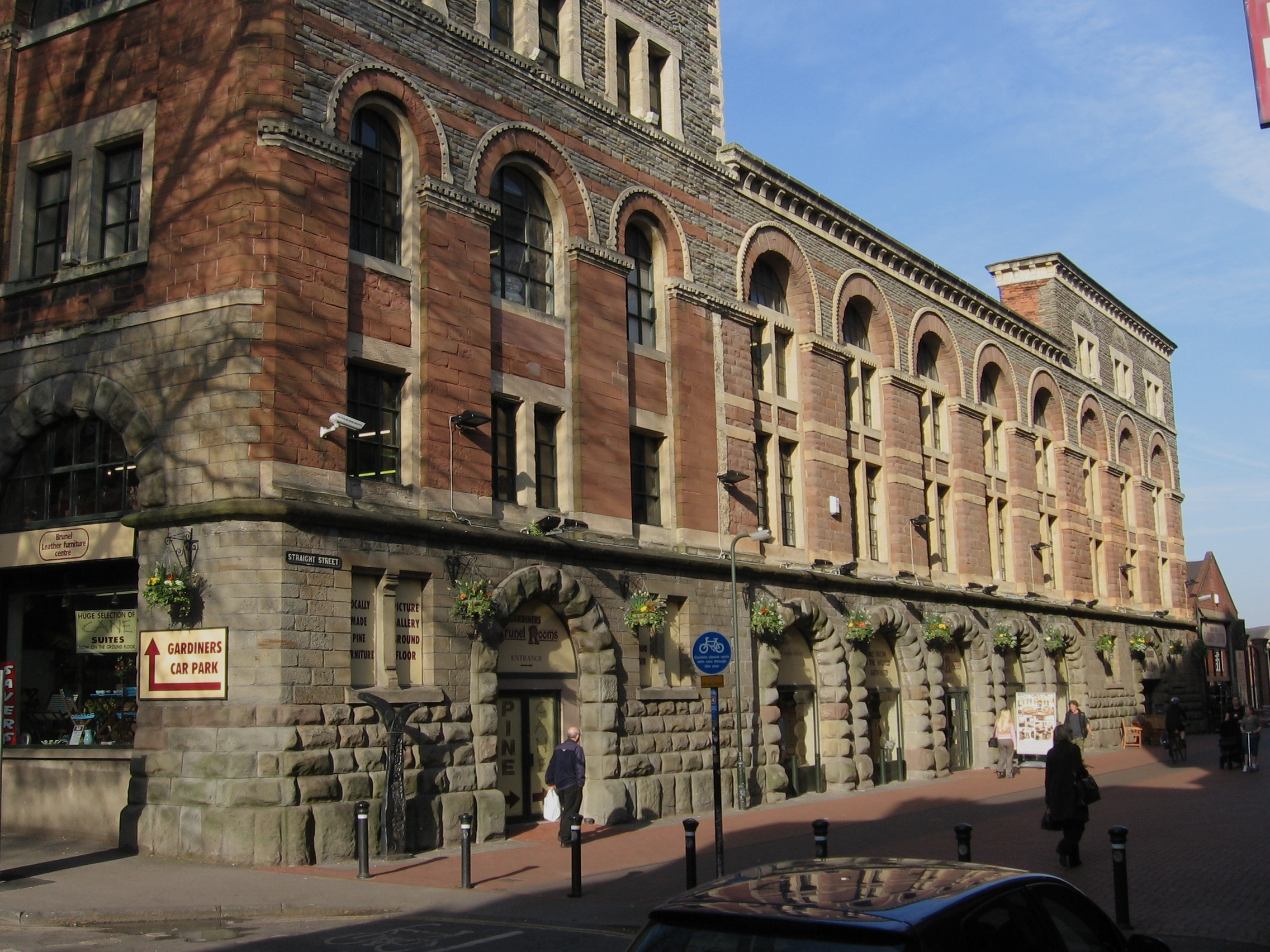

- Location within Bristol

General information
- Location: Bristol, England
- Coordinates: 51.4541°N 2.5826°W
- Completed: 1865

The Gardiners warehouse (grid reference ST596729) is on Straight Street, Broad Plain, Bristol, England.

It was built in 1865 by William Bruce Gingell and is an example of the Bristol Byzantine style. It was originally part of Christopher Thomas and Brothers' soap works, but is now a warehouse. Some of the original florentine skyline ornament have since disappeared.

In 1958 the Gardiners warehouse became home to what is now known as Gardiner Haskins of Gardiner Sons & Co Ltd, an independent homeware retailer established in 1893. In 1997 the Brunel Garden Centre that sits adjacent to the Gardiners warehouse opened.

It has been designated by English Heritage as a grade II listed building.

In 2018 Gardiner Haskins announced its intention to vacate Gardiners warehouse and move to a new showroom opposite the building.

== See also ==
- Grade II listed buildings in Bristol
