= Jacobs Wells Baths =

Former public baths built in 1889 in Bristol, England

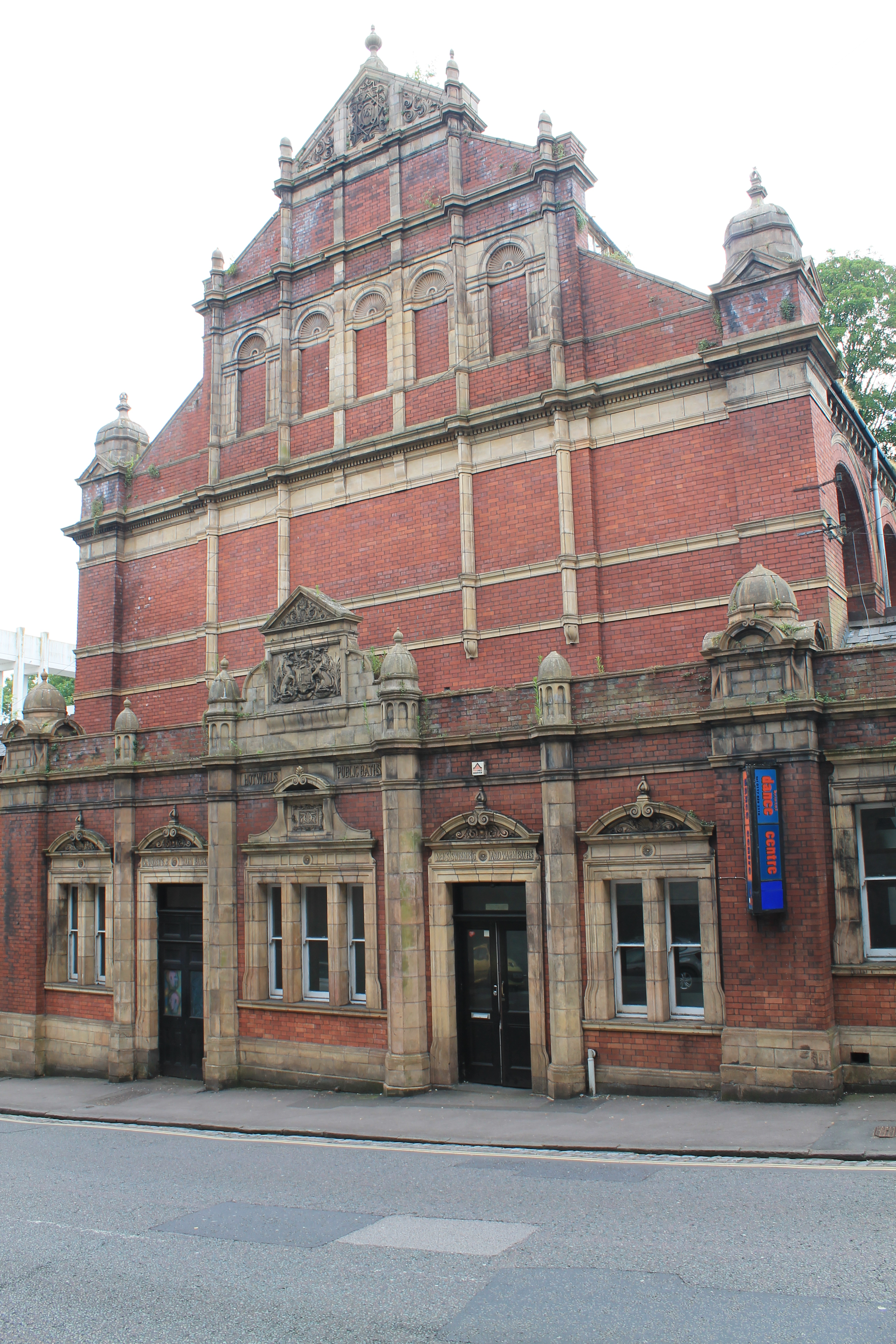

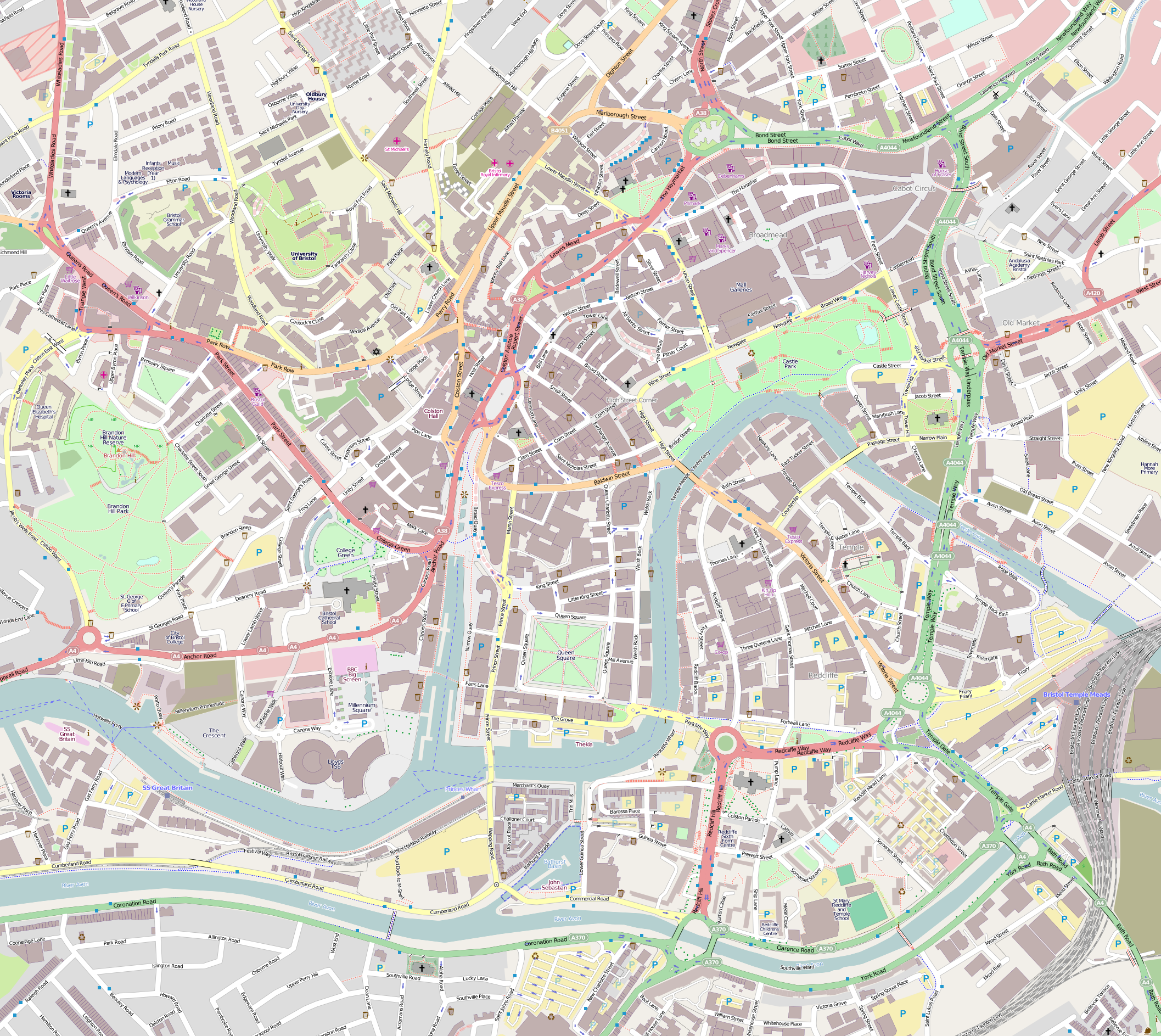
- Location within Bristol Central Location within Bristol

General information
- Architectural style: Northern Renaissance Revival style, Queen Anne Revival Style
- Classification

Listed Building – Grade II
- Official name: Hotwells Public Baths
- Designated: 4 March 1977
- Reference no.: 1292890
- Location: Hotwells Public Baths, Jacob's Wells Road, BS8 1DX, Bristol, England
- Coordinates: 51.4516122°N 2.608517°W
- Opened: 25 April 1889
- Closed: 1 April 1977 (swimming baths closed permanently)
- Cost: £10,117 (1889) (£1.4m in 2024)
- Client: Bristol Corporation
- Landlord: Bristol City Council

Design and construction
- Architect: Josiah Thomas
- Developer: A. Krauss
- Engineer: Sampsons

Jacobs Wells Baths, formally called Hotwells Public Baths, is a former public baths on Jacob's Wells Road, Bristol. Built in 1889 and designed by Bristol City Surveyor Josiah Thomas, the baths closed in the late 1970s and were converted in the 1980s into a community managed dance centre, which closed in 2016. In 2018 Bristol City Council transferred responsibility for the building to the charity Fusion Lifestyle on a 35-year lease with a peppercorn rent. The building is Grade II listed and recognised as an asset of community value by Bristol City Council.

== Bristol before public baths ==
19th Century Bristol suffered during the cholera epidemics of the early 1830s - the first time cholera had spread to the UK. The first outbreak in Bristol, which started in July 1832, killed 626 residents by November 1832.

Conditions in Bristol had not improved by 1845, when a Royal Commission appointed to investigate the Health of Towns stated the city had the unenviable reputation as "the third most unhealthy town in England", and found that there "are few, if any, large towns in England in which the supply of water is so inadequate as at Bristol", and noted there were no public baths in the city at all. The council was slow to react and, despite opening baths at Broadweir in 1847, during another cholera outbreak in 1849 444 people died.

A Report from the Government's General Board of Health to Parliament in 1850 criticised the bad or absent public works in Bristol, with one Commissioner reporting that "the state of the water-supply and privies in the affected localities perhaps worse than I have seen it in most other places."

In response to the 1845 Royal Commission, and reports from Health of Towns Associations, which criticised the poor and unsanitary conditions in Britain's cities, the government passed the Public Health Act 1848 (11 & 12 Vict. c. 63). Following the 1850 General Board of Health Report the Council decided to adopt the Act's powers, and became the Local Board of Health in 1851.

The council first set its attention to sewers, drains and supplying water, and by the 1860s was leading the way on public health reform. Between 1851 and 1883 the annual mortality rate in the city fell from 28 per thousand in 1851 to 18 per thousand in 1883.

After a less dramatic cholera outbreak in 1866, the Council in 1875 set its Baths and Wash-Houses Committee to investigate establishing public baths to cater for St Philip’s, St Augustine’s and Hotwells. The result was a recommendation to establish a public baths in lower Clifton, as the Committee noted the majority of residents in St Philip's lived within three quarters of a mile of the two existing public baths.

== A Victorian bathhouse ==
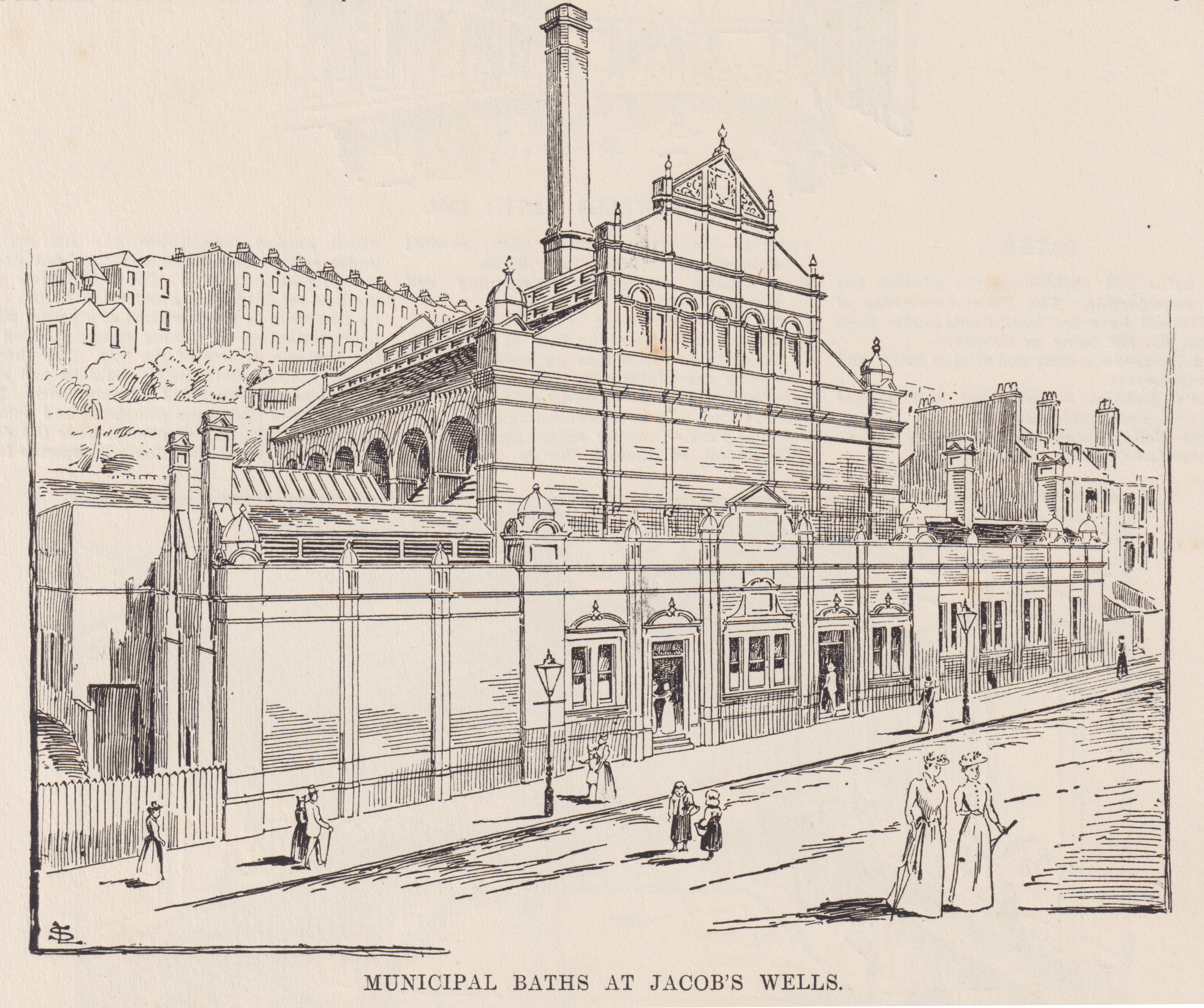
Jacob's Wells Baths (1904)

An offer on land owned by the Society of Merchant Venturers was made on 20 March 1877, and City Surveyor Josiah Thomas submitted plans to the Council in April 1879 which were approved unanimously.

The original cost proposed in 1881 was £20,000 (equivalent to £2,780,000 in 2024), but ratepayers objected to what was seen as an extravagant cost. The Council withdrew its plans and returned in 1885 with more modest proposals, costing half as much as the original, with cost-saving measures such as using Cattybrook wire-cut facing bricks instead of stone dressings.

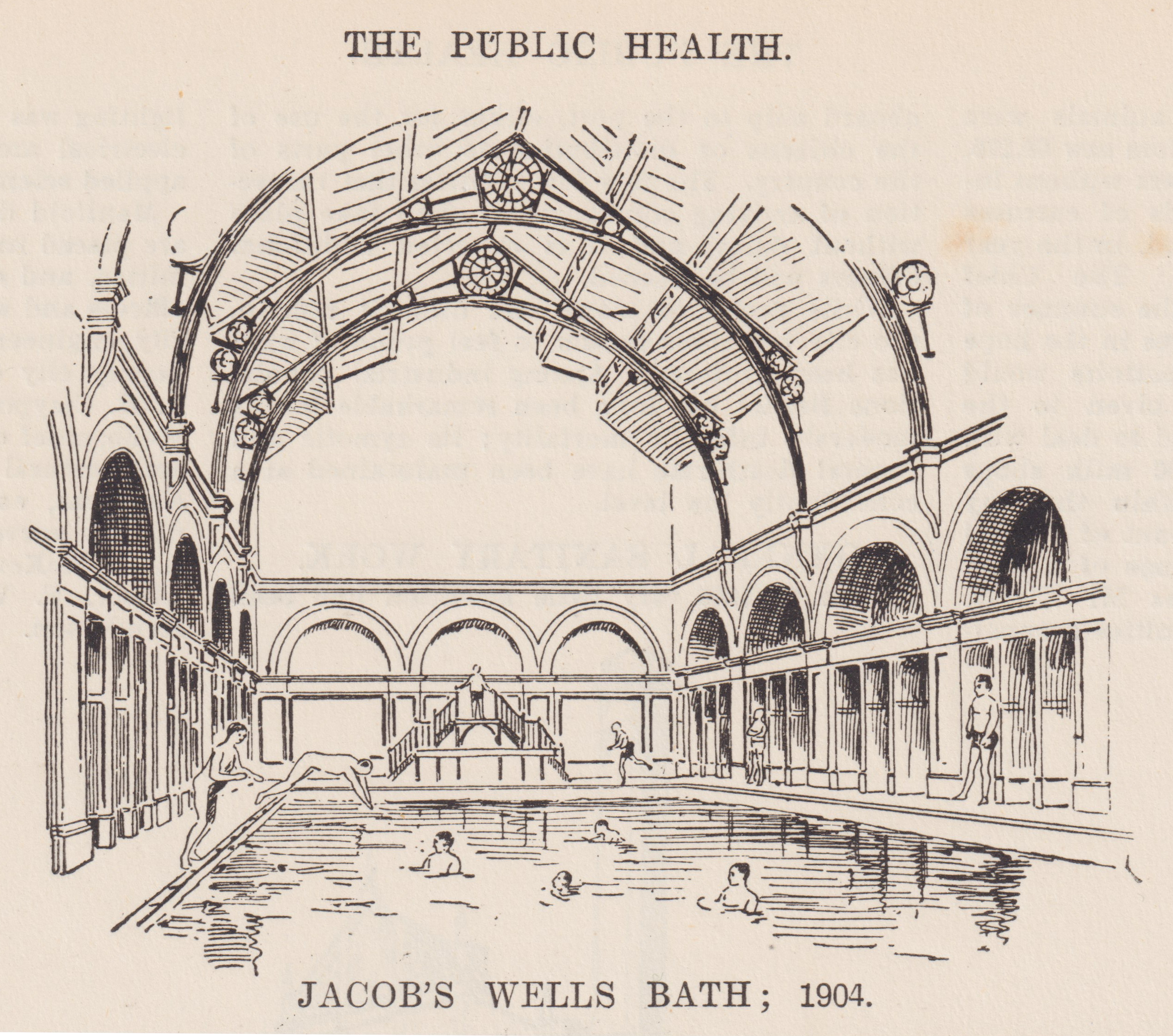
Jacob's Wells swimming pool (1904)

The Mayor opened the new bath in 1889 The Eastern elevation is particularly ornate, and the chimney stack is 120 feet high.

In its early years male and female bathing were separate. Men could use the first and second class baths, but women could only use the second class baths and not for swimming.

In 1905 the natural hot springs at Jacob's Well were diverted to feed the baths.

The baths were awarded a Grade II listing on 4 March 1977 shortly before the swimming baths were permanently closed on 1 April 1977.

== Bristol Community Dance Centre ==
On 31 October 1984 the Bristol Community Dance Centre took on a 30-year full-repairing lease for the building. The Dance Company formed in 1977, and is the longest serving dance dedicated organisation in the UK. The Dance Company rescued and reused a now internationally acclaimed 330m^{2} rosewood sprung floor from another baths in Bristol and installed it over the top of the former pool.

In 2015, full planning permission for the refurbishment of the existing south wing and the conversion of the Pump Room to a new dance studio/events space, along with the construction of a new roof over the existing watertanks to create a dance studio/events space, was granted to the Dance Centre by the council. However, funding for the granted works could not be secured without an extended lease, and negotiations with the council were unsuccessful.

The Council did not renew the site's lease with the Dance Centre due to the poor condition of the building and the enormous costs needed for redevelopment, and the Dance Centre handed the keys to the building back to the Council in August 2016.

== Future ==
In May 2016 the Council listed the baths as an asset of community value, and arranged with Artspace Lifespace a temporary 6-month lease for the building starting in September 2016 to 'caretake' the property until a permanent solution could be found. Artspace Lifespace used the building for dance, music, art and community activities.

The Council decided against selling the building's freehold and in early 2017 invited expressions of interest from "not for private profit organisations" and "social enterprises" to take over the management of the building, particularly those in the dance, music, artistic, cultural and leisure community interested in a long lease. At the same time the Council surveyed the building for damage and decay. Their commissioned report found that the historic fabric of the building was significantly damaged and would require prompt action to restore it to an adequate condition.

The council's Selection Panel assessed the four proposals, including one from Fusion Lifestyle. Fusion Lifestyle is a British charity which runs swimming pools, sports halls, indoor tennis centres and athletics stadiums across the UK, and in the South West of England operates Shepton Mallet Lido and Frome Sport & Fitness. On 4 December 2017 the Council agreed to lease the building on a peppercorn rent for 35 years to Fusion Lifestyle, subject to receiving an acceptable and sustainable full business plan. This was to be completed by 30 March 2018 but was delayed until October 2018, and Artspace Lifespace was asked to manage the building for another 6 months.

In 2017 the council invited expressions of interest from not-for-profit organisations and social enterprises to take over operations. In January 2023, Fusion Lifestyle withdrew a restoration plan as a pool and leisure centre due to increased energy costs.
