= Granary, Bristol =

Listed building in Bristol, England

Granary
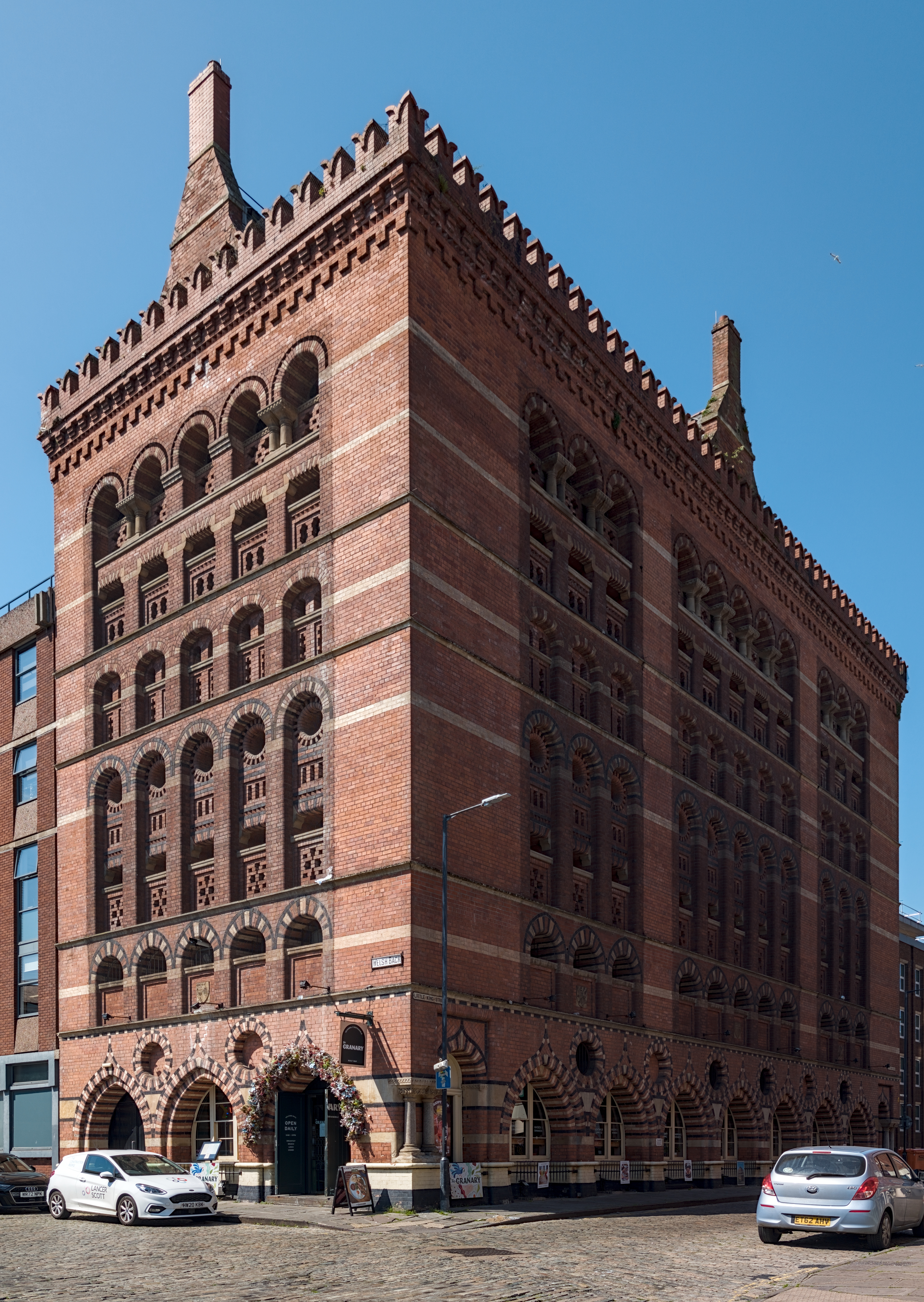

- Location within Bristol
- Alternative names: Wait and James' Granary

General information
- Architectural style: Bristol Byzantine
- Location: Welsh Back, Bristol, England
- Coordinates: 51.4521°N 2.5926°W
- Year built: 1869

Design and construction
- Architects: Archibald Ponton and William Venn Gough

Listed Building – Grade II*
- Official name: The Granary and attached area walls
- Designated: 8 January 1959
- Reference no.: 1202674

The Granary, also known as Wait and James' Granary, is a building on Welsh Back in Bristol, England. Designed by Archibald Ponton and William Venn Gough and completed in 1869, it is considered the best-preserved and most exuberant example of the Bristol Byzantine architectural style. It is designated by Historic England as a Grade II* listed building and has been identified as a key landmark within the City and Queen Square Conservation Area.

== History ==
=== Operational granary ===
The building was constructed in 1869 as a granary for the firm Wait, James and Co. To function effectively for drying large quantities of grain, the structure required immense strength, stability, and warmth, combined with excellent ventilation. The architects, Ponton and Gough, devised a functional yet highly decorative solution. Unlike many contemporary warehouses that utilized external hoists, the Granary featured internal lifts located in the corners of the building to transport grain between floors. For distribution, sacks were slid down onto the street via movable skids that extended from circular openings (oculi) in the spandrels of the ground-floor arcade.

=== The Granary Club ===
From 1968 to 1988, the building housed a celebrated music venue known as The Granary. It was initially opened in 1968 as a jazz club by Ted Cowell, under the guidance of Acker Bilk, who once described it as the "most ornate jazz club in the world".

In 1969, the venue began hosting regular rock nights organized by the Plastic Dog collective. The group, whose existing night at the nearby Dugout club had become overcrowded, initially took over the poorly attended Monday nights. By early 1970, the venue had dropped 'Old' from its title, and by 1978 it had transitioned into an all-rock club. During this era, the club hosted numerous notable acts, including Yes, Genesis, Status Quo, Motörhead, and Iron Maiden. The venue was also the filming location for the a scene in the sitcom Only Fools and Horses where the character Del Boy falls through an open bar hatch.

==== Concerts ====
1968–1988 concerts
Date	Year	Musician(s)	Tour	Note
27 June	1978	Dire Straits	Dire Straits Tour	--
12 December	1984	Random Gender	--	The first gig

=== Redevelopment ===
Following the closure of the club, the building's condition deteriorated. In 1990, Bristol City Council selected Property Enhancement (Developments) Ltd to renovate the structure. The restoration, led by architect Chris Lambert Gorwyn, involved extensive repairs to the roof and battlements, and the replacement of damaged bricks using custom-coloured replicas to match the original facade. The upper floors were converted into offices, with the top floor noted for its exposed timber and "ship-like" atmosphere.

In 2002, the building was converted into apartments. This followed a competitive bidding process initiated by the City Council, with the winning design provided by Barton Willmore. The ground floor commercial space was subsequently occupied by restaurant chains such as Loch Fyne and Belgo.

In late 2023, the ground floor opened as an all-day dining restaurant simply named "The Granary", with a cocktail bar in the basement named "The Granary Club" in homage to its previous occupant.

== Architecture ==
The Granary is constructed of red Cattybrook brick with polychrome dressings in black and white brick and limestone. The architectural style is broadly defined as Bristol Byzantine, but also incorporates elements of Ruskinian Venetian Gothic. Although the building appears to have seven storeys from the exterior, it actually contains ten floors, including attic levels. The design makes use of polychromic bricks in its structure and a complex arrangement of recessed planes to create visual interest. The ground floor acts as a massive podium with a 20-foot (6.1 m) height, featuring sturdy piers and pointed arches that support the weight of the structure above. The upper storeys are characterized by varying window patterns: the first floor features a simple arcade of round arches; the second and third floors are treated as a single unit; and subsequent floors display segmental, square, or shouldered arches. A key feature of the facade is the use of unglazed, recessed fretted brickwork screens on the upper levels, which were designed to allow ventilation for the drying grain while maintaining security. The roofline is crowned by a machicolated cornice and a crenellated parapet with distinctive forked merlons.

== See also ==
- Grade II* listed buildings in Bristol

== Bibliography ==
- Jones, Mark (2009). Bristol Folk: A Discographical History of Bristol Folk Music in the 1960s and 1970s. Bristol Folk Publications. ISBN 9780956353108.
