= Merthyr Tydfil Law Courts =

Court building in Merthyr Tydfil, Wales

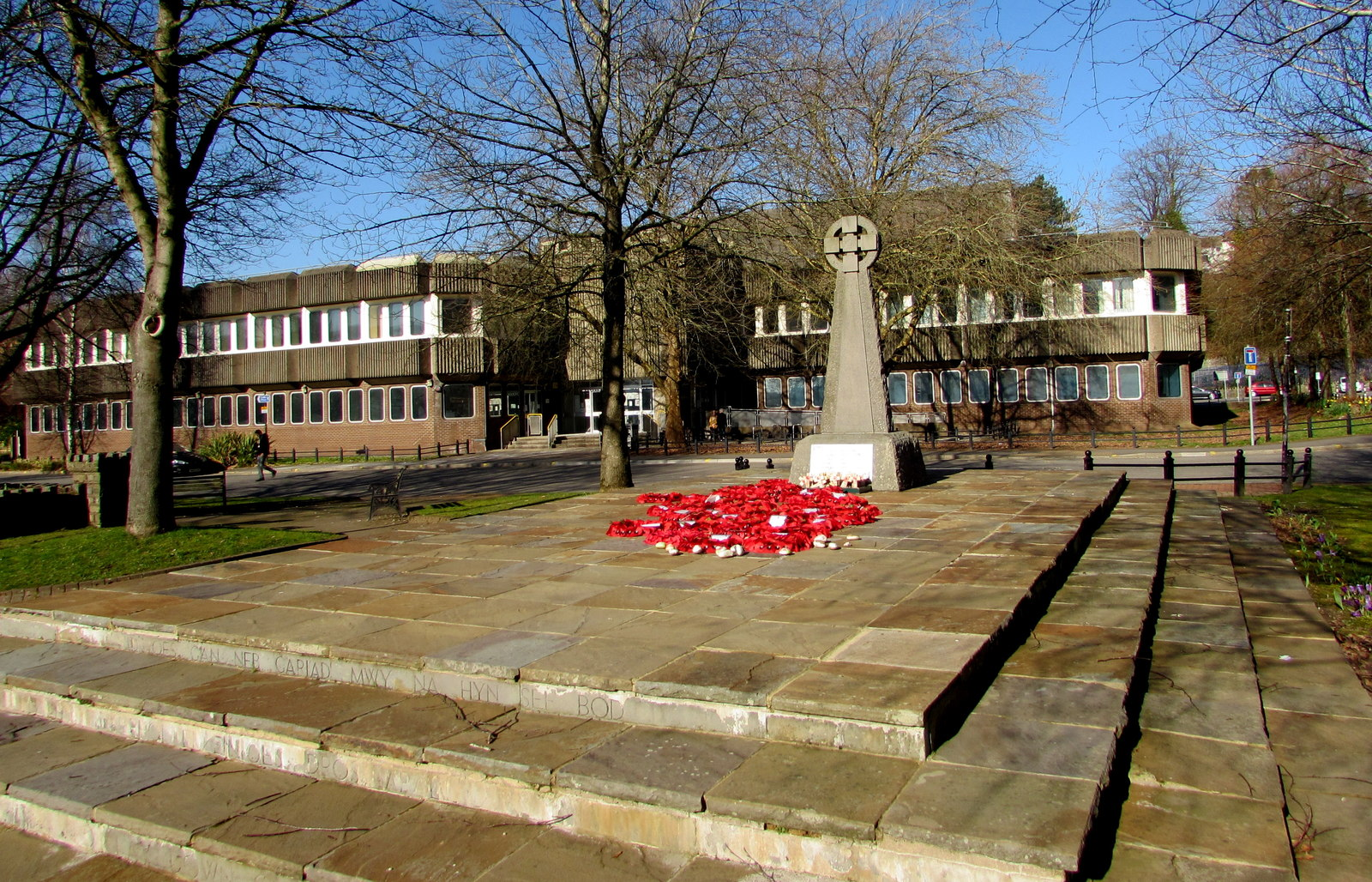
- Merthyr Tydfil Law Courts (behind the war memorial)

- Shown in Merthyr Tydfil County Borough
- 51.7473°N 3.3806°W
- Location: Glebeland Place, Merthyr Tydfil

History
- Built: 1977

Site notes
- Architectural style: Modernist style

Merthyr Tydfil Law Courts is a Crown Court venue which deals with criminal cases, as well as a County Court, which deals with civil cases, in Glebeland Place, Merthyr Tydfil, Wales. It also accommodates the local magistrates' court.

== History ==
The quarter sessions were held in the council chamber at Merthyr Tydfil Town Hall for the first time in 1910, and continued to be held there for much of the 20th century. (Note: The council chamber was also used as a courtroom.) However, as the number of court cases in Merthyr Tydfil grew, it became necessary to commission a dedicated courthouse. The new building was jointly commissioned by Mid Glamorgan County Council and the Department of the Environment with the latter paying for the crown court element, which was about half the cost. The site the commissioning bodies selected had been occupied by rows of terraced houses (Glebeland Place, Williams's Square and Lamb Lane) which had been cleared in the mid-20th century.

The new building was designed in the Modernist style, built in brick, concrete and glass at a cost of £1.7 million and was completed in 1977. The design involved an asymmetrical main frontage of two wings facing onto Castle Street. The right hand wing, which was further set back from Castle Street, featured, in the left hand bay, a short flight of steps leading up to a porch with a glass doorway, which was recessed under a ribbed and castellated concrete panel. On the ground floor, the wings were fenestrated by small square windows set above the brick work, while on the first floor, there was a row of small square windows with ribbed concrete panels above and below them. Internally, the building was laid out to accommodate four courtrooms.

The area in front of the building was occupied by a public house known as The Lamb. It was demolished in the mid-1980s and replaced by a small green with a war memorial which was unveiled in 1990.

Notable court cases have included the trial and conviction of Christopher Kerrell, in October 2018, for the murder of his wife, Hollie Kerrell.
