= Sidney Royse Lysaght =

British writer (1856–1941)

Sidney Royse Lysaght (1856–1941) (pronounced LYE-suht) was a British writer of Irish ancestry.

== Early life ==
Lysaght was born near Mallow, County Cork, son of architect Thomas Royse Lysaght (1827–1890) and Emily (née Moss; died 1905). Thomas's father, William, was a small landowner at Hazelwood, Mallow, distantly connected with the Barons Lisle. He was educated at a preparatory school and an English public school before Trinity College Dublin.

== Career ==
=== Business ===
His uncle, John Lysaght, was head of the family iron making concern, John Lysaght and Co. Sidney, who became a "successful and wealthy businessman", spent most of his life with the firm, along with his brother William. He was particularly involved in the development of corrugated iron. Having travelled "extensively throughout Australia, New Zealand, and Polynesia", he visited Robert Louis Stevenson in Samoa in 1894.

=== Writing ===
Lysaght's first work was A modern ideal, a dramatic poem (1886), "followed by a number of novels, dramas, and volumes of poetry" including Poems of the unknown way (1901), The marplot (1903), My tower in Desmond (1925), and A reading of life (1936). He wrote as "S. R. Lysaght".

== Personal life ==
Lysaght married Katherine (died 1953), daughter of Joseph Clarke, of Waddington, Lincolnshire; their only child was Edward Anthony Edgeworth Lysaght (later known as Edward MacLysaght), writer and authority on Irish family history. Lysaght died at the family estate, Hazelwood, near Mallow, which he had inherited. He also owned an extensive estate at Tuamgraney in County Clare, where he established a nursery industry. He had previously lived at Banwell Castle in Somerset.

== Works ==
- A Modern Ideal (1886) poems
- The Marplot (1893)
- One of the Grenvilles (1899)
- Poems of the Unknown Way (1901)
- Her Majesty's Rebels (1907)
- Horizons and Landmarks (1911) poems
- My Tower in Desmond (1925)
- The Immortal Jew (1931)
- A Reading of Poetry; an essay (1934)
- A Reading of Life (1936)
