= East of Eden (British band) =

British progressive rock band

- Origin: Bristol, England, United Kingdom
- Genres: Progressive rock; psychedelic rock; jazz-rock; jazz-funk; country rock
- Years active: 1967–1978; 1996–2005; 2011
- Labels: Deram, Harvest
- Past members: Dave Arbus; Ron Caines; Geoff Nicholson; Al Read; Terry Brace; Stuart Rossiter; Tony Addison; Tony Fennell; Steve York; Dave Dufort; Bryan Appleyard; Andy Sneddon; Geoff Britton; Jeff Allen; Davy Jack; Jim Roche; Don Weller; Garth Watt-Roy; Martin Fisher; Joe O'Donnell; Alan Parkes; Les Davidson; Peter Filleul; Dyl Katz; Ian Lynn
- Website: www.eastofedentheband.co.uk

East of Eden were a British progressive rock band, who had a Top 10 hit in the UK with the single "Jig-a-Jig" in 1970. The track was stylistically unlike any of their other work. Although some might consider them a symphonic progressive band, others state that their style is mostly jazz-oriented.

== History ==
Their professional career began back in 1967 when they were formed in Bristol as Picture of Dorian Gray, by Dave Arbus (b. David Arbus, 8 October 1941, Leicester, died 21 March 2025 – violin, flute, saxophone, trumpet), Ron Caines (b. Ronald Arthur Caines, 13 December 1939, Bristol – alto saxophone), Geoff Nicholson (b. Geoffrey Nicholson, 27 June 1948, near Bristol – guitar, vocals), Mike Price (bass), and Stuart Rossiter (drums). Price left in spring 1968 and was replaced by Terry Brace (born Terrence Brace, 28 September 1943, died 2006 (Bristol). Vocalist and guitarist Al Read (b. Alan G Read, 26 March 1942, Chelsea, London, died 2009) joined at the same time.

With this line-up the band released the now very-rare single, "King Of Siam", on 25 July 1968. They appeared in the film Laughter in the Dark.

Brace and Read left in September 1968; the band carried on with Nicholson as their main vocalist, with Ron Caines occasionally contributing. Brace was replaced by Steve York (b. 24 April 1948, London died 2020). Rossiter also left, and was replaced in September 1968 by Dave Dufort (b. David Dufort, 1947, London). In 1968 they moved to London, and were signed to a recording contract with Deram Records. In February 1969 Dufort left and in came Bryan Appleyard, who was replaced in June 1969 by Geoff Britton (b. Geoffrey Britton, 1 August 1943, Lewisham, South East London) (drums), who later joined Wings. York also left in June 1969, and in came bassist Andy Sneddon (born Andrew Sneddon, 8 May 1946, Kilbirnie, Ayrshire, Scotland).

In 1969, they released the Mercator Projected album, featuring the line-up of Dave Arbus, Ron Caines, Geoff Nicholson, Steve York and Dave Dufort (Dufort's surname was misspelled "Dufont" on the cover of the original LP release, and also on the CD re-release in 2008, which featured as part of its artwork a photo of the back cover of the original LP, complete with the misspelling). This album was followed by Snafu (1970) featuring Nicholson, Britton, Arbus, Caines and Sneddon; and later by Jig-a-Jig, a European-only compilation, released in 1971. Snafu reached the Top 30 of the UK Albums Chart, while a single, "Ramadhan", reached number two in France. After the band had left Deram, the company released "Jig-a-Jig" as a single and it was a surprise Top-10 hit. Caines and Nicholson had left the band in 1970, and the band (now effectively a quartet of Arbus, Davy Jack, Jeff Allen and Jim Roche) continued less successfully with Harvest Records releasing albums East Of Eden and New Leaf. The last original member, Arbus also left at the end of 1972, and was replaced by Joe O'Donnell (b. Joseph O'Donnell, 26 December 1948, Limerick, County Limerick, Ireland). In the mid-1970s the band continued to record albums for the European market and tour in Europe.

Original guitarist Nicholson left in May 1970. The band broke up in 1978 having undergone various changes in membership. Important members in late line-ups included vocalist Al Read; bassist Terence 'Terry' Brace; bassist Andy Sneddon; bassist/vocalist David 'Davy' Jack (b. 24 January 1940, Glasgow, Strathclyde, Scotland); drummer Jeff Allen (b. Jeffrey Allen, 23 April 1946, Matlock, Derbyshire – from June 1970); bassist/vocalist Martin Fisher (b. 1947, Kingston-upon-Thames, Surrey); violinist Joe O'Donnell (from March 1973); Alan 'Al' Perkes (b. 26 May 1949, Bow, east London); and guitarist Garth Watt-Roy (b. Garth Philip Watt-Roy, December 1947, Bombay, India – from February 1972).

The three core members (Arbus, Caines and Nicholson) reunited in 1996, and their album Kalipse was released the following year. Like most of their earlier work, it was a cult hit.

Arbus was a guest musician on The Who's track "Baba O'Riley", playing the violin solo. He was a friend of Who drummer Keith Moon and later became a member of Fiddler's Dram.

== Personnel ==
Late 1967 – Early 1968	Early 1968 – July 1968	July 1968 – September 1968	September 1968 – March 1969
Dave Arbus - violin, flute, saxophones; Ron Caines - saxophone, vocals; Geoff Nicholson - guitar, vocals; Mike Price - bass; Stuart Rossiter - drums	Dave Arbus - violin, flute, saxophones; Ron Caines - saxophone, vocals; Geoff Nicholson - guitar, vocals; Al Read - vocals, guitar; Terry Brace - bass; Tony Fennell - drums	Dave Arbus - violin, flute, saxophones; Ron Caines - saxophone, vocals; Geoff Nicholson - guitar, vocals; Al Read - vocals, guitar; Terry Brace - bass; Dave Dufort - drums	Dave Arbus - violin, flute, saxophones; Ron Caines - saxophone, vocals; Geoff Nicholson - guitar, vocals; Steve York - bass; Dave Dufort - drums; This is the core band line-up for the 1st album Mercator Projected and Sound Of East-Eden Live (1970)
March 1969 - July 1969	July 1969 – February 1970	February 1970 – July 1970	July 1970 – August 1971
Dave Arbus - violin, flute, saxophones; Ron Caines - saxophone, vocals; Geoff Nicholson - guitar, vocals; Andy Sneddon - bass; Brian Appleyard - drums	Dave Arbus - violin, flute, saxophones; Ron Caines - saxophone, vocals; Geoff Nicholson - guitar, vocals; Andy Sneddon - bass; Geoff Britton - drums; This is the core band line-up for the 2nd album Snafu	Dave Arbus - violin, flute, saxophones; Ron Caines - saxophone, vocals; Davy Jack - guitar, vocals; Andy Sneddon - bass; Jeff Allen - drums	Dave Arbus - violin, flute, saxophones; Jim Roche - guitar; Davy Jack - bass, vocals, guitar; Jeff Allen - drums; This is the core band line-up for the 3rd album East of Eden and the 4th album New Leaf
August 1971 - April 1972	April 1972 – February 1973	February 1973 – 1975	1975
Dave Arbus - violin, flute, saxophones; Don Weller - saxophone; Jim Roche - guitar; Davy Jack - bass, vocals, guitar; Jeff Allen - drums	Dave Arbus - violin, flute, saxophones; Garth Watt-Roy - guitar, vocals; Martin Fisher - bass, keyboards, vocals; Jeff Allen - drums	Joe O'Donnell - violin; Garth Watt-Roy - guitar, vocals; Martin Fisher - bass, keyboards, vocals; Jeff Allen - drums	Joe O'Donnell - violin; Les Davidson - guitar; Davy Jack - bass, vocals; Al Parkes - keyboards; Jeff Allen - drums
1975-1976	1976-1978	1997-2005	September 2011
Don Weller - saxophone; Les Davidson - guitar; Davy Jack - bass, vocals; Peter Filleul - keyboards, vocals; Jeff Allen - drums	Don Weller - saxophone; Les Davidson - guitar; Davy Jack - vocals; Ian Lynn - keyboards; Dyl Katz - bass; Jeff Allen - drums	Dave Arbus - violin, viola, flute; Ron Caines - saxophones, vocals; Geoff Nicholson - guitar, vocals, keyboards, bass, programming	Dave Arbus - violin, flute, saxophones; Ron Caines - saxophone, vocals; Geoff Nicholson - guitar, vocals; Andy Sneddon - bass; Geoff Britton - drums

== Discography ==
Albums

- Mercator Projected (April 1969, Deram)
- Snafu (February 1970, Deram)
- Jig-a-Jig (1971, Deram, European-only compilation)
- East of Eden (June 1971, Harvest)
- New Leaf (November 1971, Harvest)
- Another Eden (1975, Harvest, European-only release)
- Here We Go Again (1976, EMI, European-only release)
- It's the Climate (1977, EMI, European-only release)
- Silver Park (1978, EMI, European-only release)
- Kalipse (1997, Transatlantic)
- Armadillo (2001, Blueprint) (Voiceprint)
- Graffito (2005, Eclectic)

== See also ==
- Plastic Dog Agency
