= Hardware (Bristol) Limited warehouse =

Building in Bristol, England

Warehouse premises of Hardware (Bristol) Limited
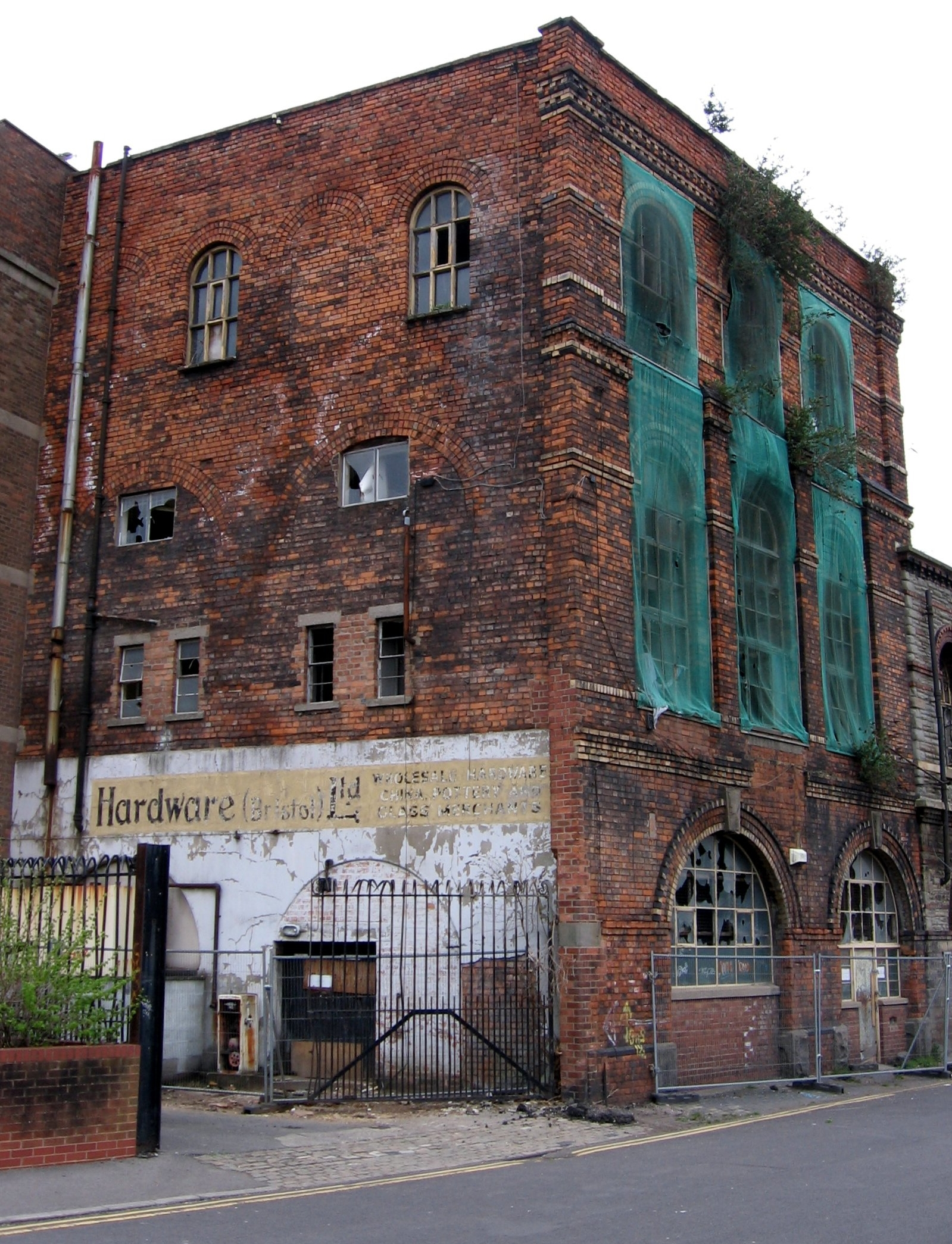

- Location within Bristol

General information
- Location: Bristol, England
- Coordinates: 51.4535°N 2.5818°W
- Construction started: 18
- Completed: 1882

The Warehouse premises of Hardware (Bristol) Limited (grid reference ST596729) is on Old Bread Street, Bristol, England.

It was built in 1882 by William Bruce Gingell in red brick with white and black brick details and is an example of the Bristol Byzantine style. It was originally part of Christopher Thomas and Brothers' soap works.

It has been designated by English Heritage as a grade II listed building.

== See also ==
- Grade II listed buildings in Bristol
