= Merthyr Tydfil Town Hall =

Municipal Building in Merthyr Tydfil, Wales

- Neuadd y Dref Merthyr Tudful (Welsh)
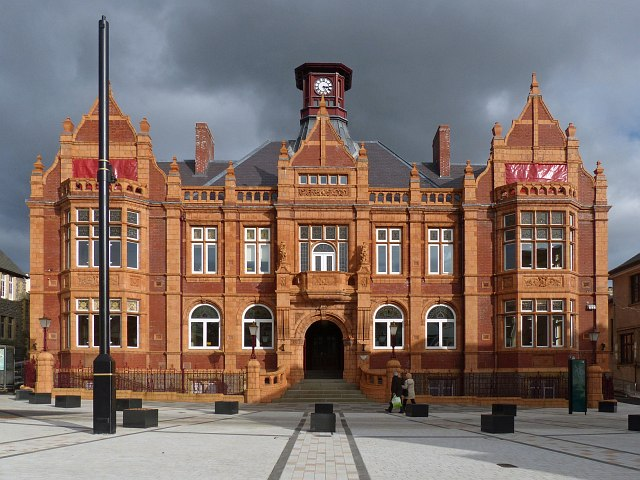
- Merthyr Tydfil Town Hall

- Shown in Merthyr Tydfil County Borough
- 51.7475°N 3.3778°W
- Location: High Street, Merthyr Tydfil

History
- Built: 1898

Site notes
- Architect: Edwin Arthur Johnson
- Architectural style: Renaissance style

Listed Building – Grade II*
- Official name: Town Hall
- Designated: 22 August 1975
- Reference no.: 11444

Merthyr Tydfil Town Hall (Welsh: Neuadd y Dref Merthyr Tudful) is a municipal building in the High Street, Merthyr Tydfil, South Wales. The town hall, which was the headquarters of Merthyr Tydfil County Borough Council, is a Grade II* listed building.

== History ==
The local board of health for Merthyr Tydfil, which was established under the chairmanship of Sir John Guest, in 1850, initially established its offices at 71 High Street. Proposals for a new town hall were considered in 1869, but the local board decided that such a development could not be afforded at that time. Following significant population growth, particularly associated with the coal mining industry, the area became an urban district in 1894. The new civic leaders decided to proceed with the town hall development: the site they close was open land on the corner of the High Street and New Castle Street, just to the north of the old offices of the local board of health.

The foundation stone for the new building was laid in May 1896. It was designed by Edwin Arthur Johnson in the Renaissance style, built in red Cattybrook brick with orange terracotta dressings by Harry Gibbon and completed in 1898. The design involved a symmetrical main frontage with seven bays facing onto the High Street with the end bays slightly projected forward with bay windows and gables; the central bay, which also slightly projected forward, featured a rounded headed doorway which was flanked by brackets supporting heraldic lions and full-height pilasters; there was a cantilevered balcony and a mullioned window on the first floor and a gable above. Internally, the principal rooms were the council chamber and the courtroom at the rear of the building.

The election of the future leader of the Labour Party, Keir Hardie, as member of parliament for Merthyr Tydfil was announced from the steps of the town hall In September 1900. Subsequent election successes were announced from the balcony. A town hall clock, supplied by Flooks & Williams, was installed in a tower above the town hall and officially started on 22 April 1903. The town became a municipal borough with the town hall as its headquarters in 1905 and a county borough with the town hall as its headquarters in 1908. The quarter sessions were held in the town hall for the first time in 1910.

The town hall continued to serve as the borough headquarters for much of the 20th century and, from 1974, as the headquarters of the enlarged Merthyr Tydfil District Council. After the courts relocated to the new Law Courts in Glebeland Place in 1977, and after the council relocated to the new Merthyr Tydfil Civic Centre in the late 1980s, the town hall became a night club. The nightclub closed in 2002 and after that the building lay derelict until 2012 when it was restored by Merthyr Tydfil Housing Association with funding from the Heritage Lottery Fund, Cadw and Merthyr Tydfil County Borough Council. The restoration works were carried out by Graham Construction to a design by Austin-Smith:Lord. The Prince of Wales reviewed the works in February 2014 and the building was officially re-opened as an arts and creative industries centre known as the Red House by the actor, Richard Harrington, on 1 March 2014. The area in front of the town hall, which had been the scene of the Merthyr Rising in 1831, was remodelled as a new public space known as Penderyn Square and re-opened by the Minister for Finance, Jane Hutt, on 20 September 2014.
