= Cattybrook brickworks =

Brickworks and SSSI in South Gloucestershire, England

Coordinates: 51.549°N 2.587°W

Cattybrook Brickpit
- Site of Special Scientific Interest
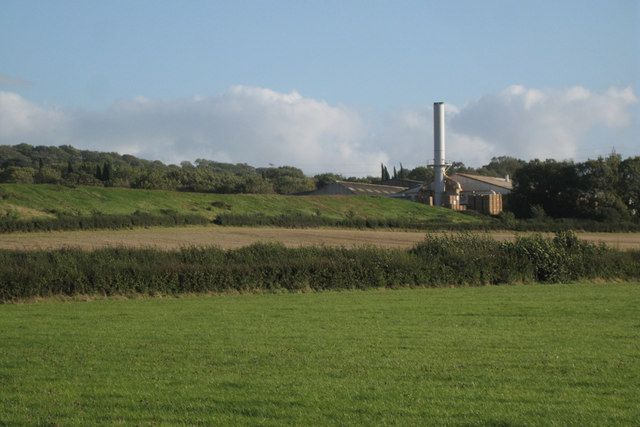
- Location of Cattybrook Brickpit.
- Area of search: South Gloucestershire
- Grid reference: ST594835
- Interest: Geological
- Area: 2.2 hectares (5.4 acres)
- Notification date: 1989
- Location map: English Nature

Cattybrook brickworks is a clay pit and brickworks near the village of Almondsbury in South Gloucestershire, England. It is operated by Ibstock plc.

Two areas totalling 2.2 hectares (5.4 acres) within the brickpit are designated as Cattybrook Brickpit geological Site of Special Scientific Interest (SSSI). The SSSI notification was made in 1989.

== History ==
The Cattybrook Brick Company was established in 1864. In 1903, Cattybrook acquired the brickworks of Shortwood Brick and Tile Company in Pucklechurch. From 1972, they were taken over by the Ibstock Group.

The brickworks are located immediately to the North of the Bristol and South Wales Union Railway, then under construction through the Severn Tunnel. By the end of 1883, the tunnel's enormous demand for bricks with which to line the tunnel was taking 100,000 bricks per month from Cattybrook. This was only a small proportion of the tunnel's need though and three other brickworks were supplying the tunnel, 1,200,000 per month in total. After completion of the tunnel, these brickworks and their masons were unemployed, leading to an over-supply of cheap bricks in the area and the first speculative housing developments in the new railway villages such as Rogiet and Pilning.

== Notable buildings and structures using Cattybrook bricks ==
Notable buildings and structures built using Cattybrook bricks include

- Jacobs Wells Baths, a former public baths in Bristol
- Maidenhead Viaduct, a railway bridge across the River Thames in Maidenhead
- Montpelier High School, a girls secondary school in Bristol
- Severn Tunnel, a railway tunnel under the Severn Estuary between England and Wales
- The Granary, a distinctive building in Bristol built in the Bristol Byzantine style
- Merthyr Tydfil Town Hall, a municipal building
- W.D. & H.O. Wills tobacco factories in Bristol
