= Edward MacLysaght =

Irish genealogist, writer and politician (1887–1986)

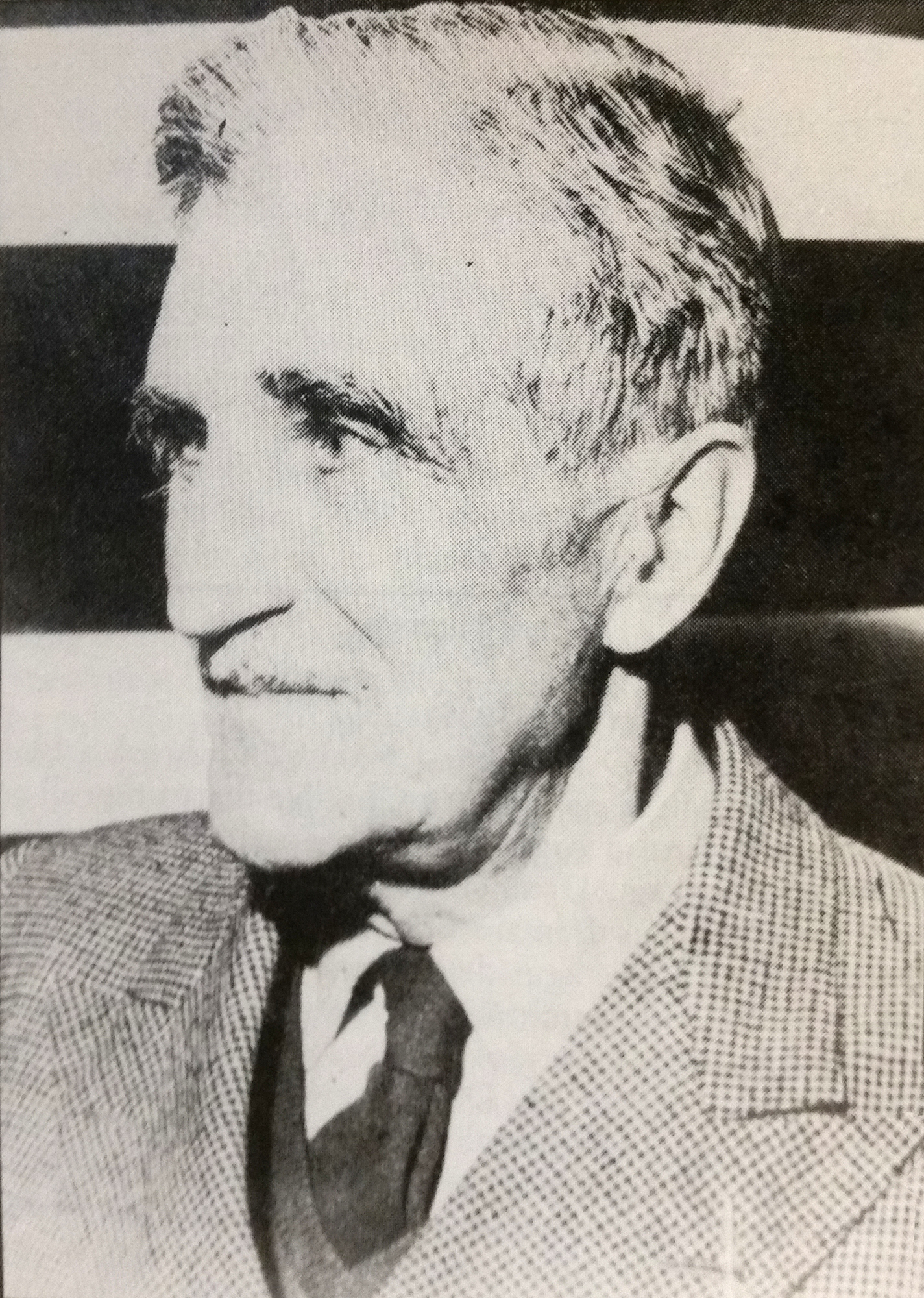
- MacLysaght, c. 1960

Senator
- In office 11 December 1922 – 17 September 1925

Personal details
- Born: Edgeworth Lysaght; 6 November 1887 Somerset, England
- Died: 4 March 1986 (aged 98) County Dublin, Ireland
- Party: Independent
- Spouses: Mabel "Maureen" Pattison (m. 1913); Mary Cuneen
- Children: 5
- Parent: Sidney Royse Lysaght (father)
- Education: Corpus Christi College, Oxford

Edgeworth Lysaght, later Edward Anthony Edgeworth Lysaght, and from 1920 Edward MacLysaght (Irish: Éamonn Mac Giolla Iasachta; 6 November 1887 – 4 March 1986) was a genealogist of twentieth-century Ireland. His numerous books on Irish surnames built upon the work of Rev. Patrick Woulfe's Irish Names and Surnames (1923).

== Early life and education ==
Edgeworth Lysaght was born at Flax Bourton, Somerset (near Bristol), to Sidney Royse Lysaght, of Irish origin, a director of the family iron and steel firm John Lysaght and Co. and a writer of novels and poetry, and Katherine (died 1953), daughter of Joseph Clarke, of Waddington, Lincolnshire. Lysaght's grandfather, Thomas Royse Lysaght, was an architect, and his great-grandfather, William Lysaght, a small landowner distantly connected with the Barons Lisle. Lysaght was named "Edgeworth Lysaght" after his father's friend, the economist Francis Ysidro Edgeworth; "Edward" was added at baptism, and he was called "Ned". "Anthony" was added at confirmation. He lost the sight in one eye after a childhood accident.

Lysaght was educated at Nash House preparatory school, Bristol, and at Rugby School, where he was unhappy, his parents' frequent absence due to his father's business responsibilities necessitating travel to South America, South Africa, and Australia contributing to this. He was a contemporary there of Rupert Brooke, whose father was Lysaght's housemaster. Eighteen months after leaving Rugby, on the advice of Francis Edgeworth, he then went to Corpus Christi College, Oxford, to study law, but, having on his own account "had a wild time as part of the smart set" and anticipating rustication after a drunken incident, he left after three terms.

== Life in Ireland ==
Lysaght took up residence in a caravan at Lahinch, County Clare, Ireland, where he had previously holidayed and become friendly with local people. His father, himself strongly connected to his Irish boyhood and wanting to establish himself as a "country gentleman", recognized his son's enthusiasm for Ireland and in 1909 bought a 600-acre estate at Tuamgraney, at which Lysaght would farm until 1913, introducing an electrical generator and other forms of modernization including the development of a limekiln, nursery, and school where young men of means could learn the basics of farming. This was the beginning of a metamorphosis for Lysaght; although of English upbringing, he disliked the local gentry, considering them "layabout rentiers", and preferred to make friendships amongst employees and his neighbours.

He sought to replace his English accent with a Clare one, and eschewed his lack of religion (despite an Anglican upbringing) of a few years before in favour of Roman Catholicism, and became involved in the Gaelic League. An integral factor in Lysaght's reinvention was his relationship with Mabel ("Maureen") Pattison; five years his senior, they had met when Lysaght spent a period at a Dublin hospital. She was born and raised in South Africa, her father a civil servant there, but had an Irish family including a local postmistress. Lysaght's family sought to avoid what they considered an unsuitable marriage, sending Lysaght and his brother Patrick on a world tour taking in Ceylon and Japan, but they were nevertheless married at the Brompton Oratory on 4 September 1913. They had two children. Mabel introduced him to friends in the Arts Club, and Lysaght entered Dublin literary society; his "somewhat overdone" attempts to "give himself a new, more Irish identity" were noticed by acquaintances. Lysaght's father invested £300 in Maunsell's publishers, who produced Lysaght's book of poems Irish eclogues. As of the early 1930s, he served on the General Committee of the Munster Agricultural Society. He and Mabel later divorced in South Africa. Lysaght remarried to Mary Cuneen. He had three children with his second wife.

By 1915 Lysaght's command of Irish had improved dramatically, and in that year he founded the Nua-Ghaeltacht at Raheen, County Clare.

He was an independent delegate to the 1917–1918 Irish Convention in which he opposed John Redmond's compromise on Home Rule. By 1918 his involvement in all aspects of the Irish independence movement had deepened greatly. Although not known if he was actually a member of the Irish Republican Army (IRA), he was very active in the Irish War of Independence as a supporter, financially and otherwise, of the East Clare Brigade of the IRA.

In 1919, he published a largely autobiographical novel entitled The Gael. In 1920, Lysaght, along with others of the name, changed his name to "MacLysaght", "so as to emphasise its Gaelic origin".

His Raheen office served as a meeting place for the Volunteers and guns, documents and ammunition were stored there. However, the war led to a sharp decline in the fortunes of his farm. The execution of close friends such as Conor Clune, manager at his seed and plant nursery, in November 1920 and the subsequent devastating raids on his farm resulted in his playing a far more active role in Sinn Féin as a loyal supporter of the new TD for Clare, Éamon de Valera. For this, he was imprisoned following his return from Britain as part of a Sinn Féin delegation which was publicising the Black and Tans atrocities.

== Later life ==
MacLysaght was elected to the Free State Seanad Éireann in 1922. He was appointed Inspector for the Irish Manuscripts Commission in 1938. MacLysaght was elected to the Royal Irish Academy in 1942 and in the same year was awarded a D.Litt. He was appointed Chief Herald of Ireland in 1943 and served in this post until 1954. MacLysaght served as Keeper of Manuscripts at the National Library of Ireland from 1948 to 1954 and was Chairman of the Irish Manuscripts Commission from 1956 to 1973.

== Death ==
MacLysaght died on 4 March 1986, aged 98, and was interred in the graveyard of St. Cronan's Church, Tuamgraney.

== Works ==
- Irish Life in the Seventeenth Century (1939)
- The Surnames of Ireland
- MacLysaght, Edward (1957). Irish Families: Their Names, Arms and Origins. Dublin: Hodges Figgis & Co Ltd.
- Supplement to Irish Families
- More Irish Families
- More Irish Families incorporating Supplement to Irish Families
- The Gael (1919)
- Cursaí Thomáis (1927)
- Changing Times (1978)

== See also ==
- Heraldry
- Office of the Chief Herald of Ireland

== Sources ==
- Ó Ceallaigh, Seán (2003). Liam Prút (ed.). Éamonn Mac Giolla Iasachta, 1887-1986: beathaisnéis. Baile Átha Cliath: Coiscéim. pp. 475p.
- , database of Irish writers; comprehensive listing of life and works. Retrieved 5 August 2010. Archived 2004.
