= William Bruce Gingell =

British architect

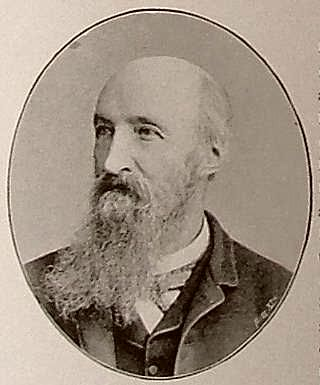
William Bruce Gingell

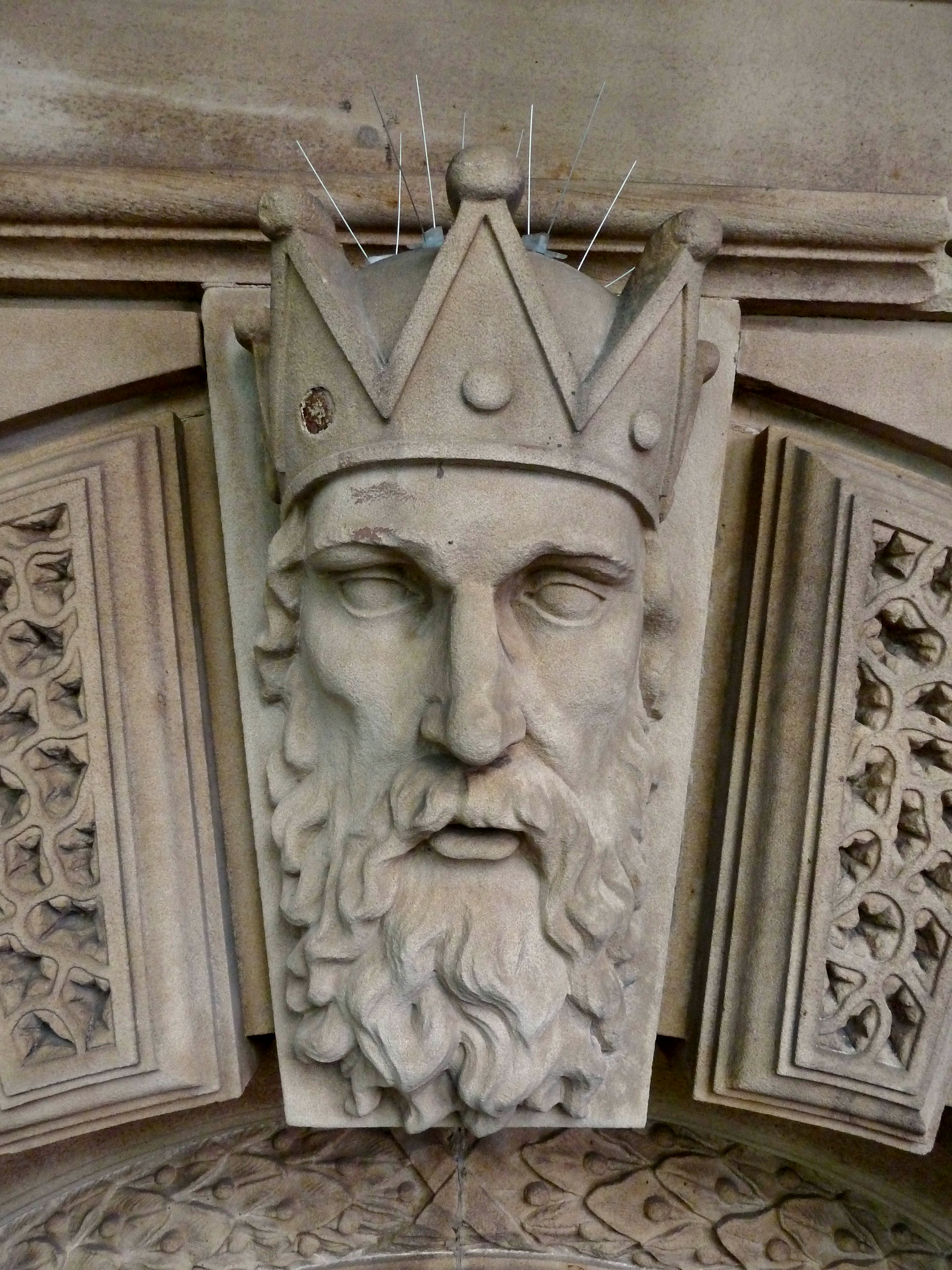
Portrait of Gingell on Moorlands House

William Bruce Gingell (1819–1899) was an architect practising in Bristol.

He was in partnership with John Henry Hirst for a time and was influential in the Bristol Byzantine architectural style.

== Significant buildings ==
- Gardiners warehouse
- Lloyds Bank, Bristol
- Robinson's Warehouse, Bristol
- Warehouse premises of Hardware (Bristol) Limited
- Moorlands House, Leeds
- Midland Bank, 55 Cardiff Street, Aberdare, 1857
