= St Vincent's Works =

Listed building in Bristol, England

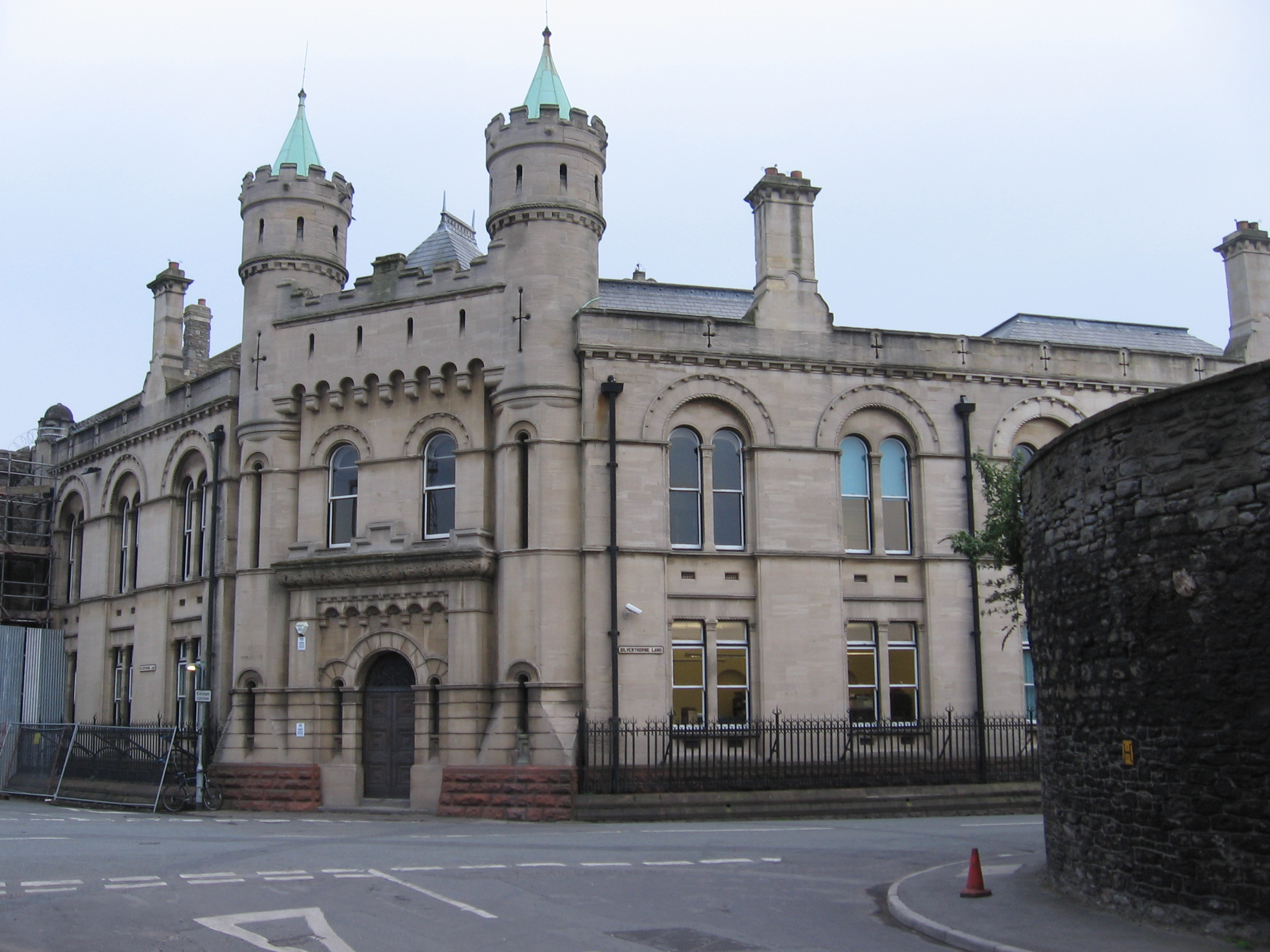

- Location within Bristol

General information
- Architectural style: Gothic Revival
- Location: Silverthorne Lane, Bristol, England
- Coordinates: 51.45040°N 2.5732°W
- Year built: 1891

Listed Building – Grade II*
- Official name: St Vincent's Works and attached front area railings
- Designated: 8 January 1959
- Reference no.: 1201988

The St Vincent's Works is a former factory and offices at Silverthorne Lane in Bristol, England.

The building was built as offices and a factory by Thomas Royse Lysaght, for his brother John Lysaght of John Lysaght and Co. with the buildings being completed by R Milverton Drake. The site was previously owned by Acraman and Company and was involved in the manufacture of corrugated-iron and pre-fabricated buildings, which were exported around the world and particular to settlers in Australia. By 1878 the factory employed 400 men and produced 1,000 tons of galvanised iron sheet a month. The company also diversified into making constructional ironwork, exported around the world from Bristol.

The building was home to the head office of renewable energy consultancy GL Garrad Hassan.

It is an example of the Bristol Byzantine style and a number of the associated buildings have Grade II* or Grade II listed status.

The company offices are Grade II* listed. The offices were built in a Gothic style with a domed atrium decorated with golden Doulton tiles. The offices have wood panelling and throughout the building are elaborate decorations.

In January 2018, the building was leased by Colliers International on behalf of a private landlord to the newly founded film production company, Screenology. The building is now under a ten-year contract with Screenology.

== See also ==
- Grade II* listed buildings in Bristol
