= William Royse Lysaght =

English steel manufacturer (1858–1945)

- Born: 23 July 1858
- Died: 27 April 1945 (aged 86); Tidenham, Gloucestershire, England
- Occupations: Steelmaker, ornithology
- Known for: The W R Lysaght Collection of Birds at Birmingham Museums and Art Gallery

William Royse Lysaght CBE JP (23 July 1858 – 27 April 1945) was an English steel manufacturer and collector of bird specimens.

== Early life ==
Lysaght was born on 23 July 1858, the son of Thomas Royse Lysaght and Emily Lysaght (née Moss). He was the nephew of John Lysaght, the founder of steel manufacturers John Lysaght and Co.

== Career as steelmaker ==
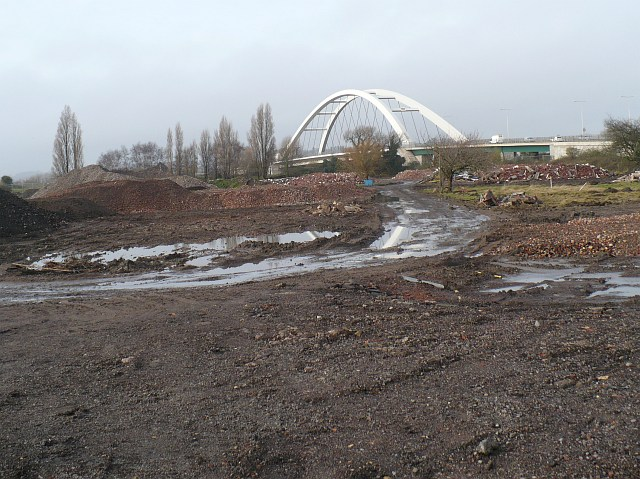
The full site of Orb steelworks occupies 74 acres. This 22 acre portion has been cleared for the creation of a housing development to be named Lysaght Village.

From 1874 Lysaght worked at the Gospel Oak works in Tipton, learning to produce sheet iron. John Lysaght purchased the Swan Garden ironworks of Wolverhampton in 1878 and William then became its manager, and he also managed the Osier Bed ironworks after that was purchased in 1885.

Over the following 10 years, William helped his uncle John plan a new sheet-rolling plant in Newport, Wales. After the death of his uncle 1895, Lysaght completed the project with the opening of the Orb Works in 1897. By 1901 Lysaght had transferred sheet metal production from Wolverhampton to Newport and went on to manage expansion of the company which employed 3,000 workers by 1913. William and his brother Sydney went on to build the Normanby Park Steelworks in Scunthorpe and, when exports were interrupted by the First World War, they began construction of an Australian steelworks in Newcastle, New South Wales, which eventually opened in 1921.

The Lysaght companies were sold to H. Seymour Berry and became part of Guest, Keen and Nettlefolds (GKN) in 1920, Lysaght becoming a director of GKN.

== Later life ==
Lysaght married Effie Elizabeth Stavern Gladstone in 1890 and had three children. In 1915 he became High Sheriff of Monmouthshire, and was appointed CBE in the 1918 New Year Honours for his services as an adviser to the wartime Ministry of Munitions. He died on 27 April 1945 at his home near Tidenham, Gloucestershire, with a wealth of £277,367 17s. 8d.

== Bird collection ==
Lysaght acquired most of his collection from E M Connop of Wroxham, near Norwich, in 1912 or 1913. The vast majority of specimens were from Norfolk and it is believed that many of the remainder were added by Lysaght himself. The 1913 catalogue of the collection, then kept at Castleford Museum in Chepstow, lists 1,860 birds in 680 cases or as individual specimens. After Lysaght's death, his son Desmond Lysaght offered the collection in 1954 to Birmingham Museum and Art Gallery, which was only able to accept a selection of it because of limited storage space' The W R Lysaght Collection at Birmingham now totals almost 1300 specimens, representing 325 different species.

== W.R. Lysaght Institute ==
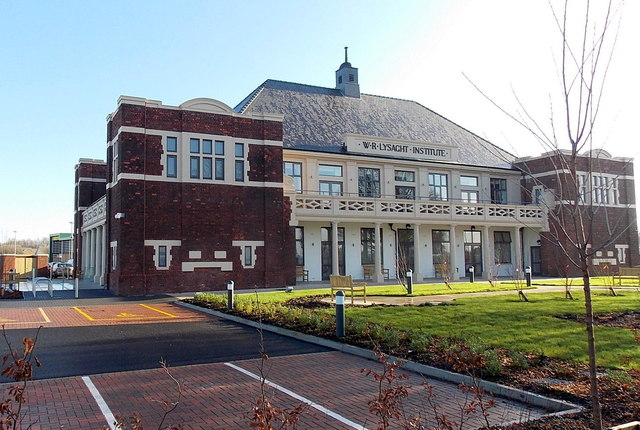
The restored Lysaght Institute in Newport

At Newport, where employment at the Orb steel works peaked at over 3,500 employees, the W.R. Lysaght Institute was opened in December 1928 on Corporation Road, as a memorial to its namesake's fifty years as the company's chairman, and to celebrate the contribution of its employees to the success of the works. It was financed jointly by the company and its workers, stood in 8 acres of grounds near the works entrance, and provided a range of facilities for staff including a ballroom, tennis courts, bowling green, and ornamental gardens. It closed in 2001, and soon became derelict. The site was initially purchased by a housing developer, but was later sold and in 2008 was bought by Linc-Cymru. It was refurbished and reopened as a community centre in November 2012.
