= King of Siam (song) =

"King Of Siam"

Single by East of Eden

from the album Kings Of Siam - Rare Tracks (1968-1970)
- B-side: "Ballad Of Harvey Kaye"
- Released: 25 July 1968
- Genre: Progressive rock
- Label: Atlantic
- Songwriter(s): Dave Arbus
- Producer(s): Glazier, Collier

"King Of Siam" is the debut single by East of Eden, released on 25 July 1968 on the 7" 45 rpm vinyl record format. It was written by Dave Arbus. The band's then vocalist guitarist Al Read believes they were the first British band to be signed to the Atlantic label.

The song isn't featured on any official compilations but appears on the unofficial Kings Of Siam - Rare Tracks (1968-1970) album released in 2013 on the French label Verne Records.

== Track listing ==
1968 7" UK single

Side one
No.	Title	Writer(s)	Length
1.	"King Of Siam"	Dave Arbus

Side two
No.	Title	Writer(s)	Length
2.	"Ballad of Harvey Kaye"	Geoff Nicholson

== Personnel ==
- Dave Arbus - violin
- Ron Caines - alto saxophone
- Geoff Nicholson - guitar, vocals
- Terry Brace - bass
- Al Read - guitar, vocals
