= John Lysaght and Co. =

Former iron and steel manufacturing company in England

- Industry: Iron and steel
- Founded: 1857
- Defunct: 1921
- Fate: acquired by GKN
- Successor: GKN
- Headquarters: Bristol
- Number of locations: Bristol; Wolverhampton; Newport; Scunthorpe
- Key people: John Lysaght; Sydney Royse Lysaght (nephew); William Royse Lysaght (nephew); Daniel Connor Lysaght

John Lysaght and Co. was an iron and steel company established in Bristol, England, and with later operations in Wolverhampton, Newport, and Scunthorpe. The company was acquired by GKN in 1920.

== The founder ==
John Lysaght (1832–1895) was born in Mallow, County Cork, Ireland, into a prosperous family of landowners; his father was William Lysaght (1800–1840), a distant relation of the Barons Lisle. John Lysaght was sent to school in Bristol, and became friendly with the Clark family. In the 1851 census he is recorded as a civil engineer living with his widowed mother and family in Liscard, Cheshire. However, in 1856 he acquired from the Clark family a small hardware galvanisation business, utilising the Crawford hot-dip technique, at Temple Back, Bristol.

The business was renamed John Lysaght Ltd., and initially employed six men and a boy. Lysaght expanded the business, buying in iron sheets and galvanising them for the expanding factory market. He adopted the name "Orb" as his trademark, and Orb corrugated galvanised iron sheeting became highly prized. Demand grew quickly, and in 1869 Lysaght purchased a larger site at St Vincent's, Netham, Bristol, for a new factory which by 1878 employed 400 men and produced 1000 tons of galvanised iron sheet a month. The company also diversified into making constructional ironwork, exported around the world from Bristol. In 1878 the company bought the disused Swan Garden Iron Works in Wolverhampton, and two years later acquired the neighbouring Osier Beds Iron Works. Together these enabled Lysaght's to produce 40,000 tons of rolled iron sheet each year, much of which was exported to Australia. John Lysaght travelled to Australia in 1879, and formed a subsidiary company there, Lysaght (Australia), the Victoria Galvanised Iron and Wire Co. In England, John Lysaght's was incorporated as a limited company in 1881, and then expanded at its bases in Bristol and Wolverhampton.

== Expansion ==
John Lysaght's nephews, Sidney Royse Lysaght (1856–1941) and William Royse Lysaght (1859–1945), both joined the company in the late 1870s. W.R. Lysaght oversaw the company's expansion, while S.R. Lysaght turned to writing novels and verse. Shortly before its founder's death in 1895, the company acquired land at Pill Farm, Newport, South Wales, on which to build a new rolling mill. The Orb Ironworks at Newport opened in 1898, and by 1901 most of the machinery at Wolverhampton, and many of the employees, had transferred to Newport. For many years copies of the Wolverhampton Express & Star were delivered regularly to newsagents in Newport, and the works football team formed the basis of what became Newport County AFC.

Under W.R. Lysaght, the works had 3,000 employees, including 600 women, and produced 175,000 tons per year, mostly for export. Daniel Connor Lysaght (1869–1940) became the works manager and led the company's expansion into electrical steels through a partnership with the Joseph Sankey Company. In 1912, the company ended its reliance on bought-in steel by opening its first steelworks, Normanby Iron Works, at Normanby Park, Scunthorpe, Lincolnshire. Its weekly output of 6,500 tons was shipped to Newport for rolling. By 1913, the Newport ironworks had 42 mills, driven by six steam engines, and the works' chimneys were a major landmark. The number of blast furnaces at Scunthorpe increased to four in 1917.

== Merger and later developments ==
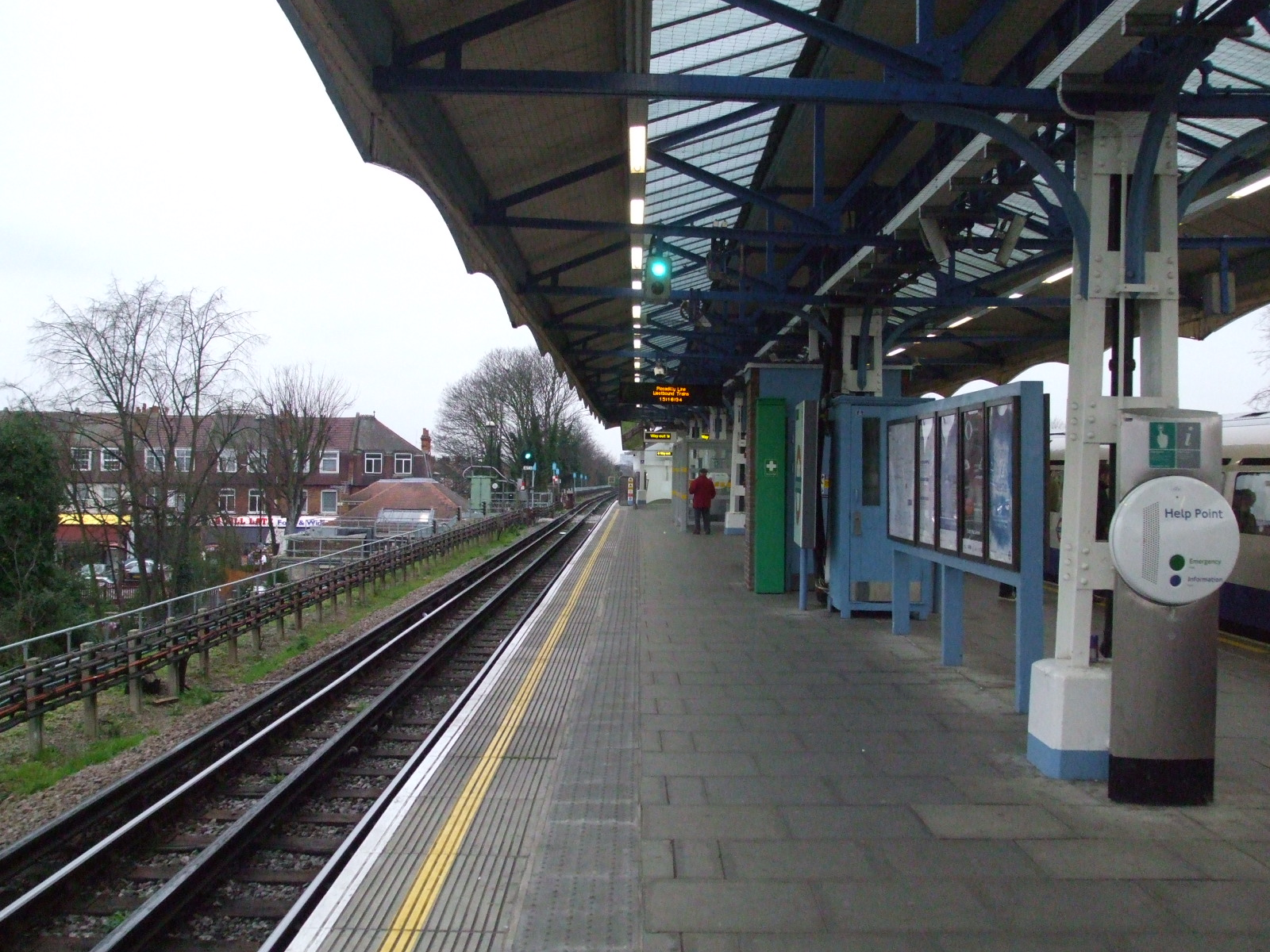
Iron platform canopy of Hounslow Central. There is still a plaque showing the maker's mark near the platform stairs.

In 1919, the Lysaght family members sold most of their shares in the company to its chairman, Seymour Berry, while remaining in control of various branches of the business. The company acquired a controlling interest in Joseph Sankey and Sons Ltd.. In 1920, Guest Keen and Nettlefolds (GKN) acquired the John Lysaght company, including its works at Newport, Bristol, and Scunthorpe. Seymour Berry, chairman of John Lysaght, and another director, then joined the board of GKN. In 1921 the company established an Australian subsidiary in Newcastle, New South Wales, and many of the Newport workers emigrated there to start up the new mills. Using the Lysaghts name, new works were also acquired or built in Argentina and Canada. The name John Lysaght remained in use by GKN as late as 1966, for its works at Newport and Scunthorpe.

The platform canopy of Hounslow Central London Underground station is one example of original John Lysaght work.

== W. R. Lysaght Institute ==
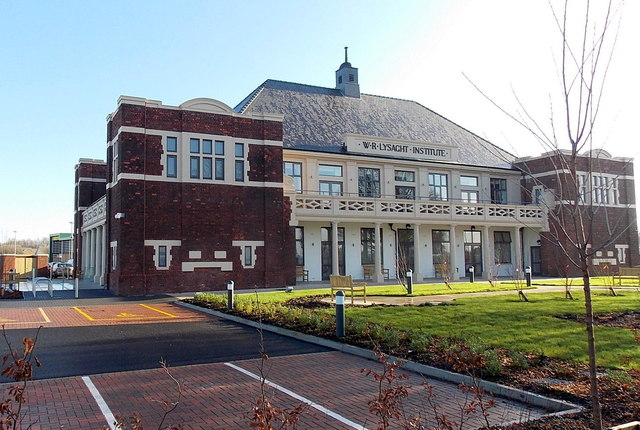
The restored Lysaght Institute in Newport

At Newport, where employment at the Orb steel works peaked at over 3,500 employees, the W. R. Lysaght Institute was opened in December 1928 on Corporation Road, as a memorial to its namesake's fifty years as the company's chairman, and to celebrate the contribution of its employees to the success of the works. It was financed jointly by the company and its workers, stood in 8 acres of grounds near the works entrance, and provided a range of facilities for staff including a ballroom, tennis courts, bowling green, and ornamental gardens. It closed in 2001, and soon became derelict. The site was initially purchased by a housing developer, but was later sold and in 2008 was bought by Linc-Cymru. It was refurbished and reopened as a community centre in November 2012.

== Main sites ==
- St. Vincent's Iron Works, Bristol
- Swan Garden Works and Osier Bed Works, Wolverhampton
- Orb Iron Works, Newport
- Normanby Park Steel Works, Scunthorpe

== See also ==
- Lysaght, Australia
