= Trudoxhill =

Village and civil parish in Somerset, England

Coordinates: 51.1902°N 2.3663°W

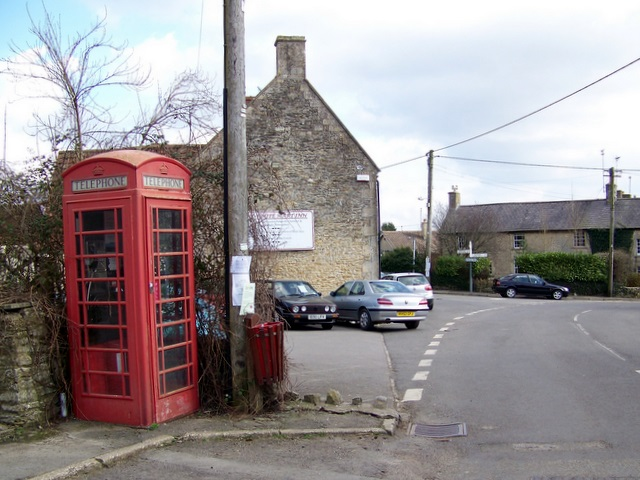

- Location within Somerset
- Population: 423 (2011)
- OS grid reference: ST745435
- Unitary authority: Somerset Council
- Ceremonial county: Somerset
- Region: South West
- Country: England
- Sovereign state: United Kingdom
- Post town: FROME
- Postcode district: BA11
- Dialling code: 01373
- Police: Avon and Somerset
- Fire: Devon and Somerset
- Ambulance: South Western
- UK Parliament: Frome and East Somerset

Trudoxhill is a village and civil parish near Nunney in Somerset, England.

== History ==
The name Trudoxhill comes from the Old English treow meaning tree, dox for dark and hyll for hill.

The parish includes the village of Marston Bigot which includes Marston Bigot Park which encompasses approximately 222 hectares (2,220,000 m^{2}) and includes Marston House, Marston Pond and the remains of the medieval shrunken village of Lower Marston.

Nearby is Marston Moat the site of a fortified manor house.

== Governance ==
The parish council has responsibility for local issues, including setting an annual precept (local rate) to cover the council's operating costs and producing annual accounts for public scrutiny. The parish council evaluates local planning applications and works with the local police, district council officers, and neighbourhood watch groups on matters of crime, security, and traffic. The parish council's role also includes initiating projects for the maintenance and repair of parish facilities, as well as consulting with the district council on the maintenance, repair, and improvement of highways, drainage, footpaths, public transport, and street cleaning. Conservation matters (including trees and listed buildings) and environmental issues are also the responsibility of the council.

For local government purposes, since 1 April 2023, the village comes under the unitary authority of Somerset Council. Prior to this, it was part of the non-metropolitan district of Mendip, which was formed on 1 April 1974 under the Local Government Act 1972, having previously been part of Frome Rural District.

The village is in the 'Postlebury' electoral ward. The ward stretches from Trudoxhill south west to Lamyatt. The total ward population at the 2011 census was 2,061.

It is also part of the Frome and East Somerset county constituency represented in the House of Commons of the Parliament of the United Kingdom. It elects one Member of Parliament (MP) by the first past the post system of election.

== Geography ==
South of the village, Postlebury Wood is a large and relatively undisturbed woodland with the first records of the woodland being from documents dated 1182, shortly after which it was incorporated in the Royal Forest of Selwood, and has been coppiced and has been used for charcoal production in the past.

== Religious sites ==
The parish Church of St Leonard was built in 1789, and altered in 1844 by Edward Davis of Bath for the Earl of Cork and Orrery. It is Grade I listed.

The former Church of St Michael at Gare Hill, on the border with Wiltshire, is now disused. It was built circa 1857 by William Butterfield for the Duke of Somerset. It is a Grade II* listed building.

There is also a small Grade I listed Church of St Leonard, at Marston Bigot.

Chapel House was built in 1699, but purchased and converted into a congregational chapel in 1717, when pews, pulpit and gallery were installed.
