= William Boyle, 12th Earl of Cork =

Royal Navy Admiral of the Fleet and peer (1873–1967)

Admiral of the Fleet The Right Honourable The Earl of Cork and Orrey GCB GCVO
- Admiral of the Fleet Lord Cork
- Born: 30 November 1873; Farnham, Surrey
- Died: 19 April 1967 (aged 93); London
- Burial place: Church of St Leonard, Marston Bigot
- Military career
- Allegiance: United Kingdom
- Branch: Royal Navy
- Service years: 1886–1940
- Rank: Admiral of the Fleet
- Commands: Home Fleet; Royal Naval College, Greenwich; Reserve Fleet; 1st Cruiser Squadron; Naval Barracks at Devonport; HMS Tiger; HMS Repulse; Red Sea Patrol; HMS Fox; HMS Skirmisher; HMS Haughty
- Conflicts: Boxer Rebellion; First World War; Second World War
- Awards: Knight Grand Cross of the Order of the Bath; Knight Grand Cross of the Royal Victorian Order

Admiral of the Fleet William Henry Dudley Boyle, 12th Earl of Cork and 12th Earl of Orrery, GCB, GCVO (30 November 1873 – 19 April 1967) was a British Royal Navy officer and peer. He served as a junior officer on the China Station during the Boxer Rebellion and went on to serve in the First World War initially as a staff officer during the Dardanelles Campaign and as then commander of the Red Sea Patrol: in that capacity, he led a six-day bombardment of the Turkish held port of Jeddah and worked closely with T. E. Lawrence in support of the Arab Revolt. In the inter-war years he was Commander-in-Chief, Reserve Fleet, President of the Royal Naval College, Greenwich and Commander-in-Chief of the Home Fleet. After succeeding a cousin and becoming Earl of Cork in 1934, he became Commander-in-Chief, Portsmouth.

Boyle also served in the Second World War, first as head of planning for Operation Catherine, an abortive naval offensive in the Baltic Sea proposed by Winston Churchill which aimed to cut off the flow of iron ore from Sweden. He then became commander designate of a planned Anglo-French expedition to assist the Finns in the Winter War they were waging against a Soviet attack: this expedition was also called off. Finally, he was given command of a naval force with a mission to retake the strategic port of Narvik in Norway from the Germans: although Narvik was briefly captured, all allied troops were eventually withdrawn.

== Naval career ==
=== Early years ===
Born the second of four sons of Colonel Gerald Edmund Boyle (a grandson of the Edmund Boyle, 8th Earl of Cork) and to Lady Elizabeth Theresa Pepys (daughter of Charles Pepys, 1st Earl of Cottenham), "Ginger" Boyle joined the training ship HMS Britannia as a cadet on 15 January 1887. He was assigned to the turret battleship HMS Monarch in the Channel Squadron in December 1888 and, following promotion to midshipman on 15 June 1889, appointed to the battleship HMS Colossus in the Mediterranean Fleet in March 1890.

Boyle transferred to the corvette HMS Active in the Training Squadron in July 1892 and, having been promoted to sub-lieutenant on 1 July 1894, he joined the gunboat HMS Lizard on the Australia Station in September 1894. Promoted to lieutenant on 1 October 1895, he transferred to the cruiser HMS Furious in the Channel Squadron in July 1898 and then became first lieutenant in the sloop HMS Daphne on the China Station in November 1898: in this capacity, he saw action during the Boxer Rebellion. He was appointed first lieutenant in the torpedo gunboat HMS Hazard on 2 July 1902, before becoming commanding officer in the destroyer HMS Haughty on 28 August 1902. He went on to be Executive Officer in the cruiser HMS Astraea in the Mediterranean Fleet in February 1904 and, having been promoted to commander on 31 December 1906, he was reassigned as Executive Officer in the battleship HMS Hibernia in the Channel Fleet in January 1907. He joined the Naval Intelligence Division at the Admiralty in January 1909 before becoming Executive Officer in the armoured cruiser HMS Good Hope in the Atlantic Fleet in 1911. He went on to be commanding officer of the scout cruiser HMS Skirmisher in the Home Fleet in January 1912 and was promoted captain on 30 June 1913. He was appointed British naval attaché in Rome in July 1913 and in that capacity was involved as an observer during the Second Balkan War. For this work he was appointed a Commander of the Italian Order of Saints Maurice and Lazarus.

=== First World War ===
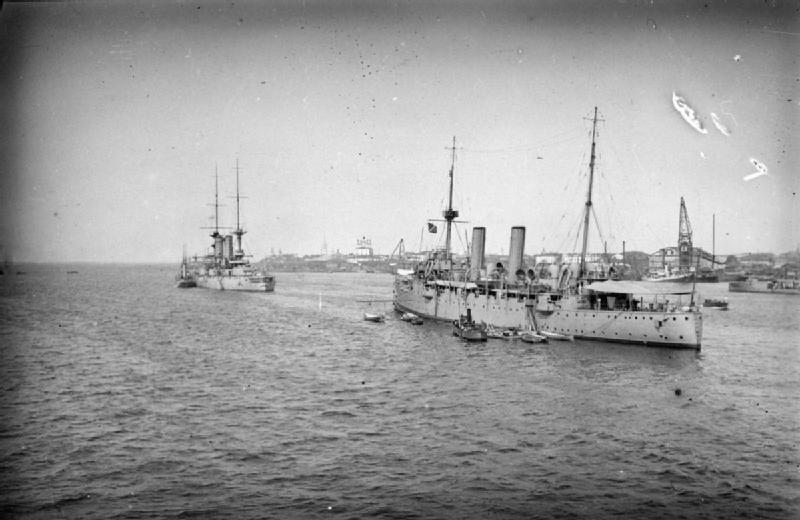
The light cruiser HMS Fox which Boyle commanded in the Red Sea during the First World War

Boyle served in the First World War initially as a staff officer on the staff of Rear-Admiral Rosslyn Wemyss during the Dardanelles Campaign. He was given command of the light cruiser HMS Fox in the Red Sea in September 1915 and went on to be commander of the Red Sea Patrol in January 1916. In that capacity he led a six-day bombardment of the Turkish-held port of Jeddah in June 1916 and worked closely with T. E. Lawrence in support of the Arab Revolt. For his services to Egypt, he was awarded the Order of the Nile, 3rd Class on 4 December 1916. He went on to be Flag Captain to Admiral Sir Henry Oliver, commanding the 1st Battlecruiser Squadron in the Grand Fleet, in the battlecruiser HMS Repulse in November 1917. He was appointed a Companion of the Order of the Bath on 1 January 1918 and, for his services to Jordan, he was awarded the Order of El Nahda, second class on 23 April 1920.

=== Inter-war years ===
Boyle became commanding officer of the battlecruiser HMS Tiger in the Atlantic Fleet in April 1919 and commanding officer of the naval barracks at Devonport in July 1921. He was appointed a naval aide-de-camp to the King on 8 November 1922. Promoted to rear admiral on 1 November 1923, he became second-in-command of the 2nd Battle Squadron of the Atlantic Fleet with his flag in the battleship HMS Resolution in May 1924. After attending the senior officers' war course at the Royal Naval College, Greenwich, he became commander of the 1st Cruiser Squadron of the Mediterranean Fleet with his flag in the cruiser HMS Frobisher in September 1926. After a tour with his squadron on the China Station and promotion to vice admiral on 12 June 1928, he became Commander-in-Chief of the Reserve Fleet with his flag in the light cruiser HMS Constance in December 1928 and President of the Royal Naval College, Greenwich in April 1929. He was advanced to Knight Commander of the Order of the Bath on 3 June 1931. Promoted to full admiral on 1 November 1932, he became Commander-in-Chief of the Home Fleet flying his flag in the battleship HMS Nelson in March 1933. He was advanced to Knight Grand Cross of the Order of the Bath on 16 July 1935.

Boyle succeeded his cousin as Earl of Cork and Orrery and Baron Boyle of Marston in 1934 and attended the funeral of King George V in January 1936. He was appointed First and Principal Naval Aide-de-Camp to the King on 12 July 1936 and attended the coronation of King George VI in May 1937. He went on to be Commander-in-Chief, Portsmouth in July 1937 and, having been promoted to Admiral of the Fleet on 21 January 1938, was still "...exceedingly fit and full of energy and drive."

=== Second World War ===
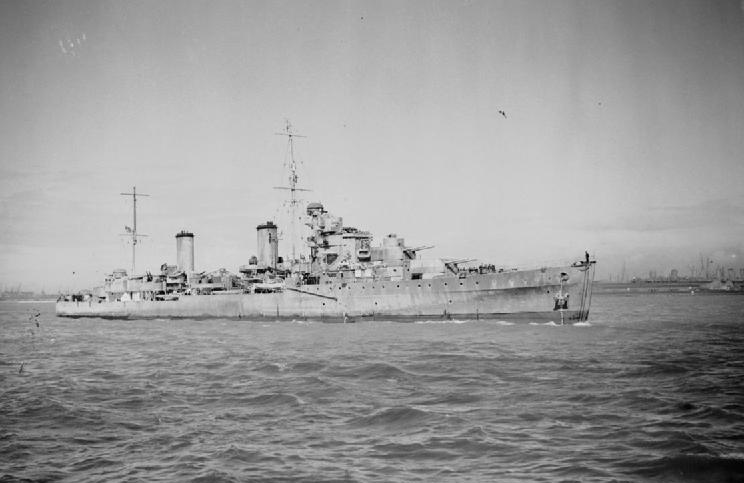
The cruiser HMS Aurora which Cork used as his flagship for operations off Norway during the Second World War

Lord Cork served in the Second World War initially as head of planning for Operation Catherine, a naval offensive in the Baltic Sea proposed by Winston Churchill which aimed to cut off the flow of iron ore from Sweden and isolate Germany from Scandinavian trade. The operation was intended to take place in the spring of 1940 but was abandoned in January 1940.

Cork then became commander designate of a planned Anglo-French expedition to assist the Finns in the Winter War they were waging against a Soviet attack: Finland agreed to Soviet terms in March 1940 and this expedition was also called off.

In April 1940 Cork was given command of a naval force with a mission to retake the strategic port of Narvik in Norway from the Germans: he flew his flag from the cruiser, HMS Aurora. Cork was in favour of an immediate storming of Narvik using both military and naval forces, but the more cautious army commander, Major General Pierse Joseph Mackesy, had orders not to attempt an opposed landing. Cork bombarded Narvik and then abandoned the mission in the face of strong German opposition. Cork provided covering fire for the landing of troops of the French Foreign Legion at Bjerkvik in May 1940 and, although Narvik was briefly captured, he was asked to support the withdrawal of all allied troops in June 1940. He was awarded the Norwegian Order of St. Olav for this operation on 13 October 1942.

=== Later years ===
Churchill was outraged at Admiral Sir James Somerville for not continuing the pursuit of the Italian Navy after the Battle of Cape Spartivento in November 1940 and dispatched Cork to conduct an inquiry, but Cork found that Somerville had acted entirely appropriately.

Cork served in the Home Guard during the final years of the Second World War and became President of Shaftesbury Homes and Arethusa, a training school for homeless boys in London, in 1942. He attended the funeral of King George VI in February 1952. He died in his home in London on 19 April 1967. He is buried in the graveyard of the Church of St Leonard, Marston Bigot in Somerset, near Marston House, the family seat.

== Family ==
Boyle married, at St. Mary's Roman Catholic Church, Chelsea, on 24 July 1902 Lady Florence Keppel (1871–1963), youngest daughter of the William Keppel, 7th Earl of Albemarle. They had no children.

== Sources ==
- Heathcote, Tony (2002). The British Admirals of the Fleet 1734 – 1995. Pen & Sword Ltd. ISBN 0-85052-835-6.
- Regan, Geoffrey (2001). Geoffrey Regan's Book of Naval Blunders. André Deutsch. ISBN 0-233-99978-7.
- Ruotsila, Markku (2005). Churchill and Finland: a study in anticommunism and geopolitics. Routledge. ISBN 978-0-415-34971-0.

Military offices
Preceded by Sir Hugh Watson	Commander-in-Chief, Reserve Fleet; 1928–1929	Succeeded by Percival Hall-Thompson
Preceded by John McClintock	President, Royal Naval College, Greenwich; 1929–1932	Succeeded by Sir Barry Domvile
Preceded by Sir John Kelly	Commander-in-Chief, Home Fleet; 1933–1935	Succeeded by Sir Roger Backhouse
Preceded by Sir William Fisher	Commander-in-Chief, Portsmouth; 1937–1939	Succeeded by Sir William James
Honorary titles
Preceded by Sir John Kelly	First and Principal Naval Aide-de-Camp; 1936–1938	Succeeded by Sir Roger Backhouse
Peerage of Ireland
Preceded by Robert Boyle	Earl of Cork; Earl of Orrery; 1934–1967	Succeeded by Patrick Boyle
