= St Michael's Church, Gare Hill =

Church in Somerset, England

St Michael's Church
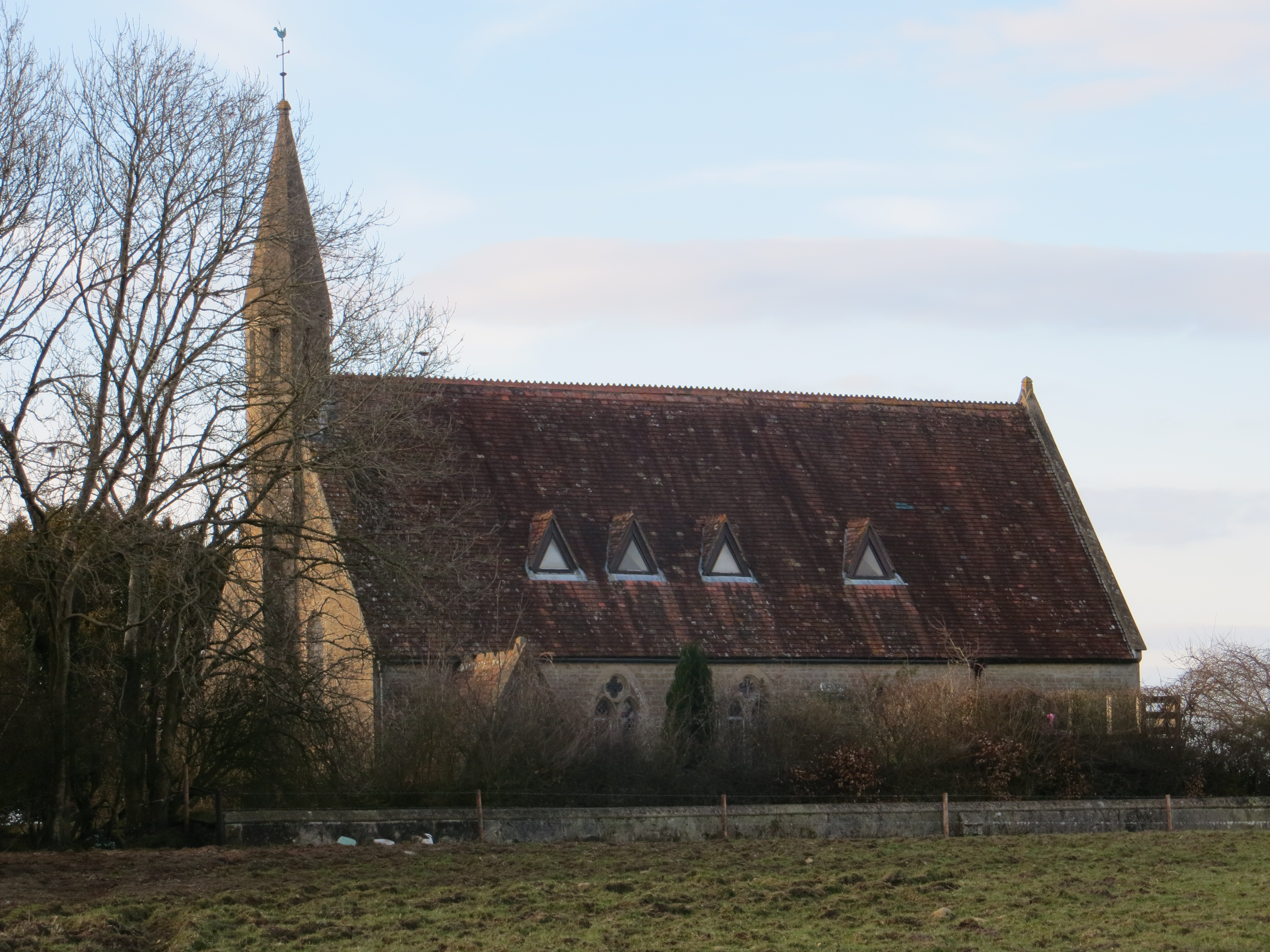
- St Michael's Church

Religion
- Affiliation: Church of England
- Ecclesiastical or organizational status: Closed
- Year consecrated: 1858

Location
- Location: Gare Hill, Somerset, England
- Interactive map of St Michael's Church
- Coordinates: 51.1608°N 2.3161°W

Architecture
- Architect: William Butterfield
- Type: Church

St Michael's Church is a former Church of England church at Gare Hill, Somerset, England. The church, which was designed by William Butterfield and built in 1857–58, has been a Grade II* listed building since 1981. The churchyard wall and gateway is also Grade II listed.

== History ==
St Michael's was built as a chapel of ease to the parish church of St Leonard's, Marston Bigot, situated approximately four miles away. It was constructed at the expense of the late Edmund Boyle, 8th Earl of Cork, who bequeathed further capital for endowment and repair funds. The designs for the church were drawn up by William Butterfield.

The foundation stone was laid on 5 October 1857 by Rev. Richard Cavendish Boyle, the rector of Marston and son of the Earl. The church was consecrated by the Bishop of Bath and Wells, Rev. Robert Eden, 3rd Baron Auckland, on 24 August 1858. The ceremony was attended by 600 persons.

With a decline in numbers of the local congregation, St Michael's was declared redundant on 1 June 1981. It was sold to a private owner and converted to residential use with planning permission approved in May 1984. The residence was named Churchfields House.

== Architecture ==
St Michael's is built of Doulting stone, with a tile roof, in the Gothic style. Designed to accommodate 150 persons, it is made up of a buttressed three bay nave and two bay chancel, with a south porch. The western end of the roof contains an octagonal bell turret with spirelet. Two stained glass windows were presented to the church by Lady Bath.
