= Operation Pike =

Cancelled plan for the bombing of the Soviet Union by Britain and France

- Part of the Second World War
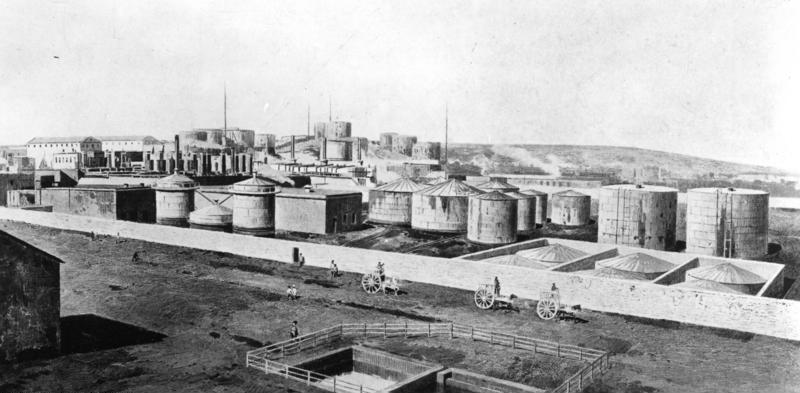
- Oil refinery in Baku, 1912. (Note: The French diplomat René Massigli, in a report to Paris, noted that US oil engineers observed "as a result of the manner in which the oil fields have been exploited, the earth is so saturated with oil that fire could spread immediately to the entire neighbouring region; it would be months before it could be extinguished and years before work could be resumed again".)
Date	Planned for late 1930s – early 1940s
Location	Soviet Union and Scandinavia
Status	Never carried out

Belligerents
Royal Air Force; French Air Force; Finland	USSR; Germany	Norway; Sweden

Operation Pike was a proposed Anglo-French strategic bombing plan to destroy oil-production facilities in the Caucasus in the early years of the Second World War. Air Commodore John Slessor oversaw planning directed against Soviet oil industry. British military planning against the Soviet Union occurred during the first two years (1939–1941) of the Second World War, when, despite formal Soviet neutrality, the British and French, as initial Allies of World War II, concluded that the German–Soviet Trade Agreement of 19 August 1939 and the German–Soviet pact of 23 August 1939 made Stalin an accomplice of Hitler and of Nazi Germany. The plan envisaged destroying the Soviet oil industry to cause the collapse of the Soviet economy and to deprive Germany of Soviet resources.

== Plan ==
After the conclusion of the German-Soviet Pact, Britain and France became concerned that the Soviets supplied oil to the Germans. Anti-communist attitudes in both countries had also increased in the first few months of World War II due to the provision by the Soviet Union of economic assistance to the Germans and their aggressive actions in Eastern Europe. Planning began soon after the Soviet invasion of Poland during September 1939 and increased after Stalin began the Winter War against Finland in November 1939. The plan included the seizure of northern Norway and Sweden and an advance into Finland to confront Soviet troops and naval forces in the Baltic Sea. The plan was considered costly and ineffective in dealing with the German threat and so was reduced to the seizure of Norway and the Swedish iron ore mines, Plan R 4. British and French politicians were for the continuation of the conflict between Finland and the USSR to legitimise their attack on the Soviet forces.

Planners identified the dependence by Germany on oil imports from the Soviets as a vulnerability that could be exploited. Despite initial opposition by some politicians, the French government ordered General Maurice Gamelin to commence a "plan of possible intervention with the view of destroying Russian oil exploitation" and the US Ambassador, Bullit, informed the US President Franklin Roosevelt that the French considered that air attacks by the French Air Forces in Syria against Baku to be "the most efficient way to weaken the Soviet Union". According to the report by General Gamelin that was submitted to the French prime minister on 22 February 1940, an oil shortage would cripple the Red Army, the Soviet Air Force and Soviet collective farm machinery, which would make possible widespread famine and even the collapse of the Soviet government,

Dependence on oil supplies from the Caucasus is the fundamental weakness of Russian economy. The Armed Forces were totally dependent on this source also for their motorized agriculture. More than 90 percent of oil extraction and 80 percent of refinement was located in the Caucasus (primarily Baku). Therefore, interruption of oil supplies on any large scale would have far-reaching consequences and could even result in the collapse of all the military, industrial and agricultural systems of Russia.

— Gamelin

An important source of raw materials would also be denied to Germany by the destruction of the oil fields. Serious preparation by the British began after the end of the Winter War in March 1940. By April, plans to attack oil production facilities in the Caucasian towns of Baku, Batum and Grozny were complete. Bombers were to be flown from bases in Iran, Turkey and Syria in "Western Air Plan 106", with the code name Operation Pike. The French proposed accelerating the planning but the British were more cautious for fear of a possible German-Soviet alliance if the allies attacked the Soviets.

The Soviet government anticipated Allied attacks and from 25 to 29 March, the command of the Transcaucasian Military District performed the following map exercise. According to the scenario, the "black" forces, continuing their actions against the "brown" forces at the Western Front, attacked in co-operation with "blue" and "green" forces; they were repelled by the "reds" in the Caucasus, who then started a counteroffensive towards Erzurum and Tebriz. Some scholars do not take the British plans of attack seriously and regard them as mere contingency plans. The Latvian Soviet historian Vilnis Sīpols noted that the British and French military staff had developed strategic plans for assaulting the USSR from the south but that neither government had a political decision to invade.

== Reconnaissance missions ==
During March 1940, after the end of the Winter War, the British performed secret reconnaissance flights to photograph areas inside the USSR by using high-altitude, high-speed stereoscopic photography pioneered by Sidney Cotton. Using specially modified and unmarked Lockheed Model 12 Electra Junior aircraft painted a special blue camouflage scheme developed by Cotton, who commanded the RAF Photographic Development Unit (PDU), the Secret Intelligence Service launched high-altitude reconnaissance flights from RAF Habbaniya, a Royal Air Force station in Iraq. One such mission was flown on 30 March 1940. Flying over the mountainous region of southeastern Kurdistan, in Iranian airspace, across the coast of the Caspian Sea and then north towards Baku, the flight entered Soviet airspace at 11:45 after a four-hour flight. Loitering for an hour and making six photographic runs with its 14 in (360 mm) aerial camera, the aircraft left Baku at 12:45 and returned to RAF Habbaniya. Another reconnaissance sortie was flown on 5 April from RAF Habbaniya, this time crossing Turkish airspace to reach Batumi. The flight encountered Soviet anti-aircraft fire and a Soviet fighter attempted an interception. The British had obtained everything that they needed for interpreting photographs and mapping the Soviet petroleum facilities.

== Preparations for air campaign ==
Analysis of the photography by the PDU revealed that the oil infrastructure in Baku and Batumi were particularly vulnerable to air attack, as both could be approached from the sea and so the more difficult target of Grozny would be bombed first to exploit the element of surprise. Oil fields were to be attacked with incendiary bombs, and tests conducted at the Royal Arsenal at Woolwich revealed that light oil storage tanks at the oil processing plants could be detonated with high explosives. As of 1 April, four squadrons comprising 48 Blenheim Mk IV bombers were transferred to the Middle East Command and were supplemented with a number of single-engined Wellesley bombers for night missions. A French force of 65 Maryland bombers and a supplementary force of 24 Farman F.222 heavy bombers were allocated for night operations during the campaign. The French were preparing new air fields in Syria that were expected to be ready by 15 May. The campaign was expected to last three months and more than 1,000 short tons (910 t) of bombs were allocated to the operation, 404 × 500 lb (230 kg) semi-armour-piercing bombs, 554 × 500 lb (230 kg) and 5,188 × 250 lb (110 kg) general-purpose bombs and 69,192 × 4 lb (1.8 kg) incendiary bombs.

== German capture of Allied plans ==
The German invasion of Western Europe from 10 May 1940 and the swift Fall of France derailed the plans. The Germans captured a train stalled at the village of La Charité-sur-Loire that contained boxes of secret documents evacuated from Paris. Among them were documents dealing with Operation Pike. On 4 July, the Deutsches Nachrichtenbüro (German News Bureau) released excerpts of the captured documents relating to Operation Pike and asserted that

Germany must be credited with saving these other states [including the Soviet Union] from being drawn into this chaos by Allied schemings... because she took timely counter-measures and also crushed France quickly.

— DNB

The strategic bombing campaign against Soviet targets was postponed and eventually abandoned.

=== Revival against Germany ===
After the attack on the USSR by Germany (Operation Barbarossa) in June 1941, Operation Pike was revived as a contingency plan to be invoked if German forces occupied the Caucasian oil fields.

== Problems ==
Although the British and the French pursued the operation to weaken the Germans and the Soviets, the result would likely have been more damaging for the Allies. If the attack had occurred prior to the invasion of France, Britain may have had the prospect of fighting a German–Soviet alliance alone if France was defeated, which also would have delayed the almost-inevitable German–Soviet conflict. If it were resurrected in 1942 to deny oil fields in the Caucasus to the advancing Germans if the Soviets could not sabotage them, success in destroying them would have harmed the Soviets more. Operation Pike was motivated largely by the desire for action and avoiding massive, direct confrontation during the Phoney War, the overconfidence of strategic bombing enthusiasts and the idea of harming both Germany and the USSR simultaneously.

== See also ==
- Anglo-Soviet Agreement (1941)
- Anglo-Soviet Treaty (1942)
- Franco-British plans for intervention in the Winter War
- Franco-Soviet Treaty of Mutual Assistance
- Moscow negotiations of 1939
- Operation Catherine
- Operation Unthinkable
