= Operation Catherine =

Proposed British offensive during World War II

Operation Catherine was a proposed Baltic Sea offensive by the United Kingdom's Royal Navy to be undertaken in early 1940. It aimed at interdicting German seaborne commerce with the Soviet Union, Sweden, Finland, Estonia and Latvia. In particular, an objective was to stop the flow of Swedish iron ore to Germany. The driving force behind the project was the First Lord of the Admiralty Winston Churchill, and the head of planning was Admiral of the Fleet Lord Cork. Events overtook the proposed operation and resulted in its cancellation.

== Plan ==
Churchill proposed a substantial naval squadron: three Revenge-class battleships, an aircraft carrier, five cruisers, two destroyer flotillas, submarines and supporting auxiliaries. The battleships would need to be significantly modified to resist air and submarine attack to pass through the shallow waters. HMS Royal Sovereign would have been fitted with very large bulges to her hull to make her 140 ft (43 m) wide to increase her buoyancy and thus reduce her draught by 9 ft (2.7 m) even after the addition of 4 to 5 in (100 to 130 mm) of deck armour (some 2,000 long tons (2,000 t) of armour would be used in total). Only two of her main turrets would be retained, but elsewhere, the elevation for those guns would be 30 degrees. In the new state, her top speed would have been about 13–14 kn (24–26 km/h; 15–16 mph) in action. As well as cutting off German iron ore supplies, Churchill anticipated that the show of force would encourage the Scandinavian nations to join the war against Nazi Germany.

== Objections ==
The First Sea Lord Admiral Sir Dudley Pound opposed the plan for several reasons. The armour plating was in short supply and was needed elsewhere; the three battleships were badly needed, particularly if Italy and Japan also declared war; the impact of air power was underestimated in the plan; and the loss of such a squadron would encourage Italy and Japan to declare war.

== Cancellation ==
Despite those cogent arguments and widespread opposition, Churchill continued to push hard for Catherine. Pound avoided a head-on argument and apparently co-operated while he pointed out problems. Finally, on 20 January 1940, Churchill cancelled the operation.

== See also ==
- Plan R 4
- Operation Pike
- Franco-British plans for intervention in the Winter War
- Anglo-German Naval Agreement of 1935
- British submarine flotilla in the Baltic
- Baltic Project - a First World War plan for British intervention in the Baltic
