= Postlebury Wood =

Woodland in Somerset, England

- Site of Special Scientific Interest
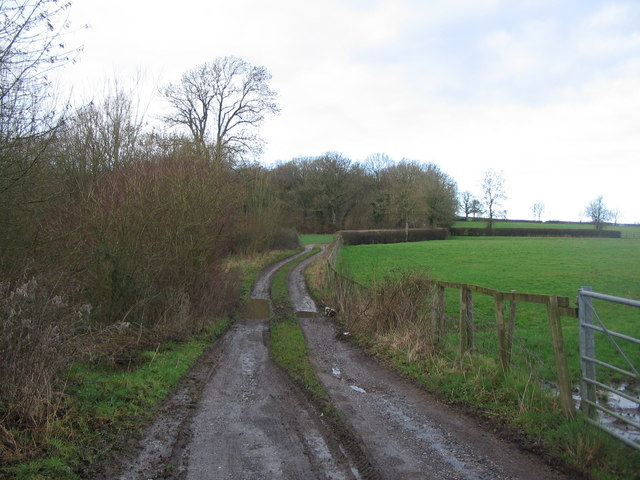

- Location within Somerset
- Location of Postlebury Wood.
- Area of search: Somerset
- Grid reference: ST740430
- Coordinates: 51.18563°N 2.37339°W
- Interest: Biological
- Area: 87 hectares (0.87 km^{2}; 0.34 sq mi)
- Notification date: 1987

Postlebury Wood (grid reference ST740430) is an 87 hectare biological Site of Special Scientific Interest south of Trudoxhill in Somerset, notified in 1987.

Postlebury Wood is a large and relatively undisturbed woodland with the first records of the woodland being from documents dated 1182, shortly after which it was incorporated in the Royal Forest of Selwood, and has been coppiced and has been used for charcoal production in the past.

The wood is largely composed of Oak (Quercus robur), Ash (Fraxinus excelsior) and Hazel (Corylus avellana). The ground flora is well developed, ranging from communities of Bluebell (Hyacinthoides non-scripta), Bracken (Pteridium aquilinum), Foxglove (Digitalis purpurea) and Wood Sorrel (Oxalis acetosella). Plants of particular interest include Solomon's Seal (Polygonatum multiflorum), Greater Butterfly Orchid (Platanthera chlorantha), Bird's Nest Orchid (Neottia nidus-avis), Broad-leaved Helleborine (Epipactis helleborine) and Autumn Crocus (Colchicum autumnale).

Postlebury Wood supports large populations of homostyle Primroses, a plant found in only one area outside south-east Somerset. These plants, which are unique in that they represent a self-fertile form of a normally self-sterile species, are of international significance in providing opportunities for genetic studies.
