= Plan R 4 =

World War II British plan for an invasion of Norway in April 1940

Map of Norway in 1939

Plan R 4 was an unrealised British plan to invade Norway and Sweden in April 1940, during the Second World War. As a result of competing plans for Norway and Operation Weserübung, the German invasion of Norway the same month, it was not carried out as intended. Similar Franco-British plans for intervention in the Winter War had been made.

== Background ==
Germany lacked iron ore for steel production and before the war, iron ore had been imported from mines in the French region of Lorraine. Since the outbreak of war in September 1939, that supply had been cut off and shipments from the other large supplier, Sweden, were essential for the production of military equipment.

In the Gulf of Bothnia, the northern part of the Baltic Sea, lies the Swedish port of Luleå from where ore is shipped during the summer. The Baltic that far north froze in winter and for several months each year, the Swedes sent iron ore by rail to the ice-free port of Narvik, in the far north of Norway. In a normal year, 80 per cent of the iron ore was exported through Narvik. The only alternative in winter was a long rail journey to Oxelösund on the Baltic, south of Stockholm, which was not frozen. British intelligence suggested that Oxelösund could ship only a fifth of the weight that Germany required. Travelling inside Norwegian territorial waters for most of the trip, the shipping from Narvik was virtually immune to British interception.

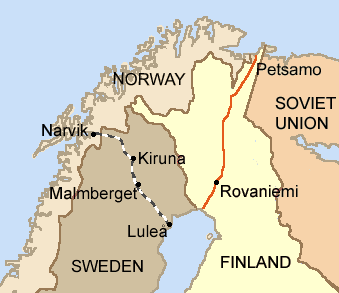
Franco-British support was offered to Finland, which had been invaded by the Soviet Union, if they were given free passage through neutral Norway and Sweden, instead of taking the road from Petsamo. This was a pretext to occupy the iron ore districts in Kiruna and Malmberget. (borders, 1920–1940)

The British and the French strategy was to use the Winter War, the invasion of Finland by the Soviet Union that had begun on 30 November 1939, as an excuse for seizing the Swedish ore fields in the north and the Norwegian harbours through which it was shipped to Germany. The plan was to get Norwegian and Swedish permission to send an expeditionary force to Finland across Sápmi, ostensibly to help the Finns. Once there, they were to take control of Swedish harbours and mines, occupy cities such as Gävle and Luleå, ending German access to Swedish ore and presenting Norway and Sweden with a fait accompli. Because of the danger of Allied or German occupation and of the war being waged on their territory, the Swedes and the Norwegians refused the transit requests.

The Germans, aware of the danger, were making plans for an invasion of Norway to protect their supply of iron ore. The Altmark Incident of 16 February 1940 convinced Hitler that the Allies would not respect Norwegian neutrality and he ordered the plans for an invasion hastened. The Scandinavian reluctance to allow Allied troops on their territory baulked the original Allied plan for using aid to Finland as a pretext for sending troops but on 12 March, the Allies decided to try a "semi-peaceable" invasion instead. Troops were to be landed in Norway and were to move into Sweden to capture the Swedish mines but if serious military resistance from the Norwegians was encountered, the Allies were not to press the issue. Finland sued for peace on 13 March and the revised version of the plan had to be abandoned. Faced with this, the Allied instead began work on Plan R 4.

The Germans knew something of the Allied plans. Intercepted radio traffic showed that Allied transport groups had been readied. Later interceptions informed Germany that the Allies had abandoned the plan and redeployed their forces. Adolf Hitler feared that the Allies would launch their invasion sooner or later and 9 April was set as the date of Operation Weserübung, the German attack on Denmark and Norway.

== Plan ==
=== Operation Wilfred ===
Operation Wilfred, set to commence on 5 April (but delayed to 8 April) was a British naval operation intending to place two minefields inside Norwegian territorial waters already. Ships carrying ore would have to sail into international waters and run the gauntlet of the Royal Navy, which could prevent the transport of Swedish iron ore to Germany. The Norwegian and the Swedish governments were to be publicly informed some days beforehand and to be accused of inability to uphold their neutrality.

==== Plan R 4 ====
R 4 consisted of

- Operation Stratford – the main British force (Scots Guards + AA) to occupy the area from Narvik to the Swedish border following the railway.
- Operation Avonmouth (combined British and French force) – a raid to destroy the Sola airfield outside Stavanger and occupation of Bergen and Trondheim, the force comprising the main part of 146th and 148th Infantry Brigades plus a French Alpine brigade.
- Operation Plymouth – consisting of the Hallamshire Battalion of the 146th Infantry Brigade to land at Trondheim and advance eastwards.

According to military historian Earl F. Ziemke in his 1960 essay "The German Decision To Invade Norway and Denmark", it was hoped that Operation Wilfred would provoke a German reaction in the form of troop landings or threats thereof and R 4 was to be executed "the moment the Germans landed in Norway 'or showed they intended to do so". The first battalion transports were to sail within a few hours of the mines having been laid. In his 2007 essay "The German Invasion of Norway, 1940: The Operational Intelligence Dimension" the historian Adam Claasen wrote "it is not intended that any Forces shall be landed in Norway until the Germans have violated Norwegian Territory, or there is clear evidence that they intend to do so". Both authors agree that the plan assumed the Norwegians would not resist the British forces.

== Aftermath ==
Plan R 4 could not be executed as planned, as most of the German navy was reported to be in Norwegian waters already. The plan to invade northern Sweden after Norway had to be abandoned as Allied troops were swiftly sent to support the Norwegians against the Germans, but success was achieved only in the Narvik area, where the Germans were brought close to surrender. The Allied troops consisted of 24,500 British, Norwegian, French and Polish troops, in particular marine infantry, French Foreign Legionnaires and Polish mountain troops. The German troops were composed of 2,000 mountain troops and 2,600 seamen from the sunken German invasion flotilla. On 17 April 1940, Hitler ordered the German troops to evacuate to Sweden to be interned (see the Allied campaign in Norway). The Battle of France and the Low Countries led to an Allied troop redeployment. Allied troops were evacuated in Operation Alphabet from Narvik by 8 June 1940.

== See also ==
- Franco-British plans for intervention in the Winter War
- Foreign support of Finland in the Winter War
- British occupation of the Faroe Islands
- Iceland in World War II
- Operation Catherine
- Operation Pike
