= Marston Moat =

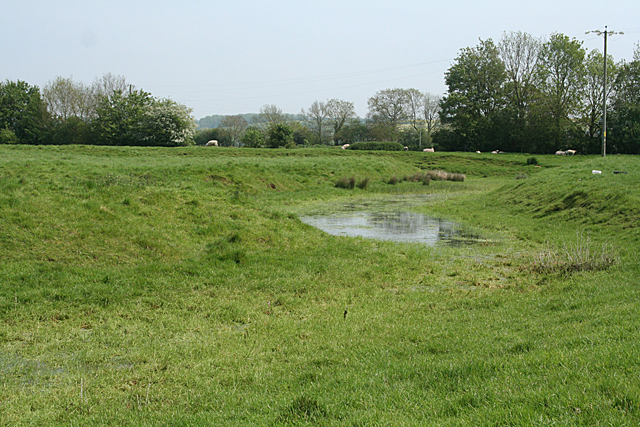
- The remains of the moat

- Location within Somerset
- 51°11′35″N 2°20′03″W
- Location: Trudoxhill, Somerset, England

Scheduled monument
- Official name: Marston Moat
- Designated: 1 November 1966
- Reference no.: 29779

Marston Moat is the site of a fortified manor house in the parish of Trudoxhill, Somerset, England. It has been designated as a Scheduled Ancient Monument. It is now on the Heritage at Risk Register due to animal burrowing.

The 23 feet (7.0 m) wide moat which measures 108 feet (33 m) by 188 feet (57 m) has a 10 feet (3.0 m) wide and 1 foot (0.30 m) high bank on its south and east sides. It is situated east of the River Frome.

The site was held by the Bigot family of Marston Bigot before 1195. There is some evidence that they fortified it without a licence to crenellate from Edward II. As a result of this and an insult to the King's messenger Richard Bigot lost his titles to land, which were assigned to William de Meriet and John de Meriet.

It was leased as a farmhouse by the reign of Edward IV however none of the stone remains, and no full excavation has ever been carried out.
