= Franco-British plans for intervention in the Winter War =

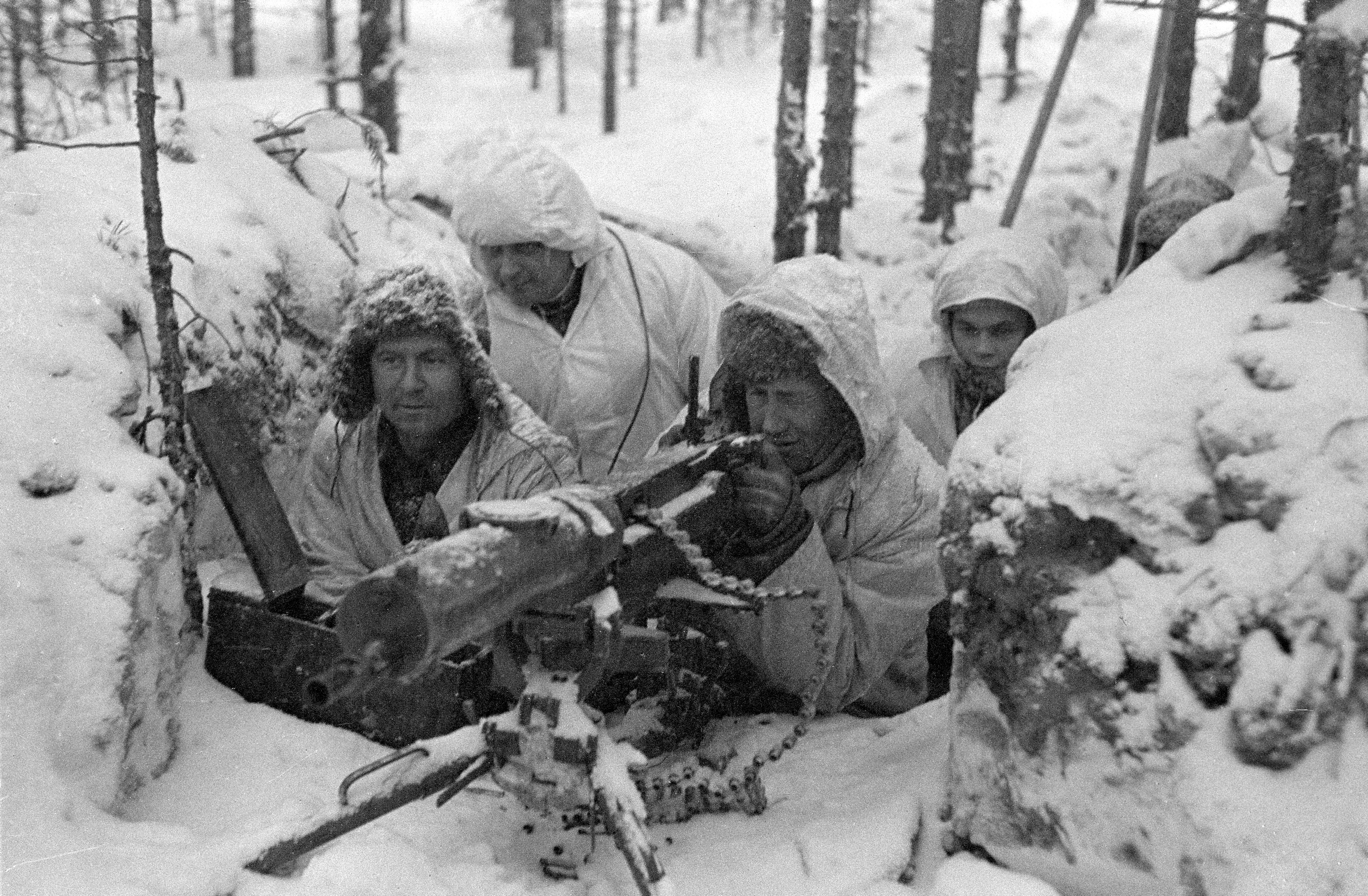
A Finnish machine gun crew during the Winter War

During the early stages of World War II, the United Kingdom and France made a series of proposals to send troops to assist Finland against the Soviet Union during the Winter War, which started on 30 November 1939. The plans involved the transit of British and French troops and equipment through neutral Norway and Sweden. The initial plans were abandoned because Norway and Sweden declined transit through their land for fear that their countries would be drawn into the war. The Moscow Peace Treaty ended the Winter War in March 1940, which precluded the possibility of intervention.

== Background ==
The Winter War started in November 1939. In February 1940, a Soviet offensive broke through the Mannerheim Line on the Karelian Isthmus, which exhausted Finnish defenses and forced the country's government to accept peace negotiations on Soviet terms. As the news that Finland might be forced to cede its sovereignty to the Soviet Union, public opinion in France and Britain, which already supported Finland, swung for military intervention. When rumors of an armistice reached governments in Paris and London, both decided to offer military support.

Finland's resistance to the Soviet invasion, from November 1939 to March 1940, came while there was a military stalemate on the continent called the "Phoney War". Attention turned to the Nordic Theatre. Months of planning at the highest civilian, military and diplomatic levels in London and Paris saw multiple reversals and deep divisions.

Finally, the British and French agreed on a plan that involved uninvited invasions of Norway, Sweden, Iceland and Denmark's Faroe Islands with the goals of damaging the German war economy and assisting Finland in its war with the Soviet Union. An Allied war against the Soviet Union was part of the plan. The main naval launching point would be Royal Navy's base at Scapa Flow, in the Orkney Islands.

The Soviet invasion of Finland excited widespread outrage at both popular and elite levels in support of Finland not only in Britain and France but also in the neutral United States. The League of Nations declared the Soviet Union to be the aggressor and expelled it. "American opinion makers treated the attack on Finland as dastardly aggression worthy of daily headlines, which thereafter exacerbated attitudes toward Russia".

The real Allied goal was economic warfare: to cut off shipments of Swedish iron ore to Germany, which was calculated to weaken German war industry seriously. The British Ministry of Economic Warfare stated that the project against Norway would be likely to cause "An extremely serious repercussion on German industrial output... [and the Swedish component] might well bring German industry to a standstill and would in any case have a profound effect on the duration of the war". The idea was to shift forces away from doing little on the static Western Front to playing an active role on a new front.

The British military leadership, by December, had supported the idea enthusiastically after it had realised that its first choice, an attack on German oil supplies, would not get approval. Winston Churchill, now leading the Admiralty, pushed hard for an invasion of Norway and Sweden to help the Finns and to cut the iron supplies. Likewise, political and military leaders in Paris strongly supported the plan because it would put their troops in action. The poor performance of the Soviets against the Finns strengthened the confidence of the Allies that the invasion, and the resulting war against the Soviets would be worthwhile. However, the civilian leadership of Neville Chamberlain's government in London drew back and postponed invasion plans. Also, neutral Norway and Sweden refused to co-operate.

== Initial Allied approaches ==
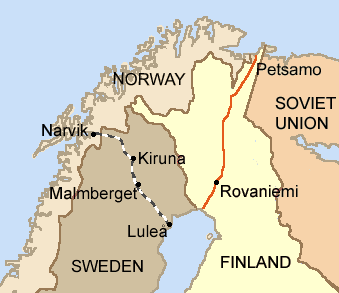
Franco-British support was offered on the condition their armed forces be given free passage through neutral Norway and Sweden instead of taking the difficult and Soviet-occupied passage from Petsamo.

The first intervention plan, approved on 4–5 February 1940 by the Allied High Command, consisted of 100,000 British and 35,000 French troops, which would disembark at the Norwegian port of Narvik and support Finland via Sweden while they secured supply routes along the way. Plans were made to launch the operation on 20 March under the condition of a formal request for assistance from the Finnish government to avoid German charges that the Franco-British forces were an invading army. On 2 March, transit rights were officially requested from the governments of Norway and Sweden. It was hoped that Allied intervention would eventually bring the neutral Nordic countries, Norway and Sweden, to the Allies by strengthening their positions against Germany, but Hitler had by December declared to the Swedish government that Franco-British troops on Swedish soil would immediately provoke a German invasion.

The Franco-British plan, as initially designed, proposed a defence of all of Scandinavia north of a line Stockholm–Gothenburg or Stockholm–Oslo (the British concept of the Lake Line following the lakes of Mälaren, Hjälmaren, and Vänern), which would provide a good natural defense some 1,700–1,900 kilometres (1,100–1,200 mi) south of Narvik. The planned frontier involved Sweden's two largest cities but also could result in large amounts of Swedish territory to be occupied by a foreign army or to become a war zone. The plan was revised to include only the northern half of Sweden and the narrow adjacent Norwegian coast.

== Norwegian reaction ==
The Norwegian government denied transit rights to the proposed Franco-British expedition.

== Swedish reaction ==
The Swedish government, headed by Prime Minister Per Albin Hansson, declined to allow transit of armed troops through Swedish territory although Sweden had not declared itself neutral in the Winter War. The Swedish government argued that since it had declared a policy of neutrality in the war between France, Britain and Germany, the granting of transit rights by Sweden to a French-British corps, even if it would not be used against Germany, was still an illegal departure from international laws on neutrality.

That strict interpretation appears to have been a pretext to avoid angering the Soviet and German governments. Another interpretation was to deny the Allies an opportunity to fight Germany far from Britain or France and to destroy the Swedish infrastructure in the process.

The Swedish Cabinet also decided to reject repeated Finnish pleas for regular Swedish troops to be deployed in Finland and the Swedes and made it clear that their present support in arms and munitions could not be maintained for much longer. Diplomatically, Finland was squeezed between Allied hopes for a prolonged war and Swedish and Norwegian fears that the Allies and Germans might soon be fighting each other on Swedish and Norwegian soil. Norway and Sweden also feared an influx of Finnish refugees if Finland lost to the Soviets.

Fifteen months later, the Swedish government conceded to German demands for transit rights of one division across Sweden for German troops on their way from occupied Norway to Finland to join the German attack on the Soviet Union. A total of 2,140,000 German soldiers on leave and more than 100,000 German military railway carriages crossed neutral Swedish territory during the next three years.

== Further Allied proposals and effect on peace negotiations ==
Germany and Sweden pressured Finland to accept peace on unfavourable conditions, but Britain and France had the opposite objective. Different plans and figures were presented for the Finns. France and Britain promised to send 20,000 men, who were to arrive by the end of February. By the end of that month, Finnish Commander-in-Chief, Field Marshal Mannerheim was pessimistic about the military situation and on 29 February, the government decided to start peace negotiations. The same day, the Soviets commenced an attack against Viipuri.

When France and Britain realized that Finland was considering a peace treaty, they gave a new offer of 50,000 troops, if Finland asked for help before 12 March. Finland hoped for Allied intervention, but its position became increasingly hopeless. Its agreement to an armistice on 13 March signalled defeat. On 20 March, a more aggressive Paul Reynaud became prime minister of France and demanded an immediate invasion; Chamberlain and the British cabinet finally agreed and orders were given of Operation Wilfred to provoke a justification. However, Germany invaded first and quickly conquered Denmark and southern Norway in Operation Weserübung, repelling Allied counter-efforts in Scandinavia. With the British failure in Norway, Britain decided it immediately needed to set up naval and air bases in Iceland. Despite Iceland's plea for neutrality, Britain considered its occupation as a military necessity. The British occupied the Faroe Islands on 13 April, and the decision made to occupy Iceland on 6 May.

== See also ==
- Operation Wilfred, scheme to mine the neutral Norwegian waters.
- Allied campaign in Norway
- Foreign support in the Winter War
- Plan R 4, plan for the invasion of Northern Norway and Sweden.
- Swedish iron mining during World War II
- Operation Pike, strategic bombing of Soviet oilfields in Caucasus.
