= St Leonard's Church, Marston Bigot =

Church in Somerset, England

St Leonard's Church
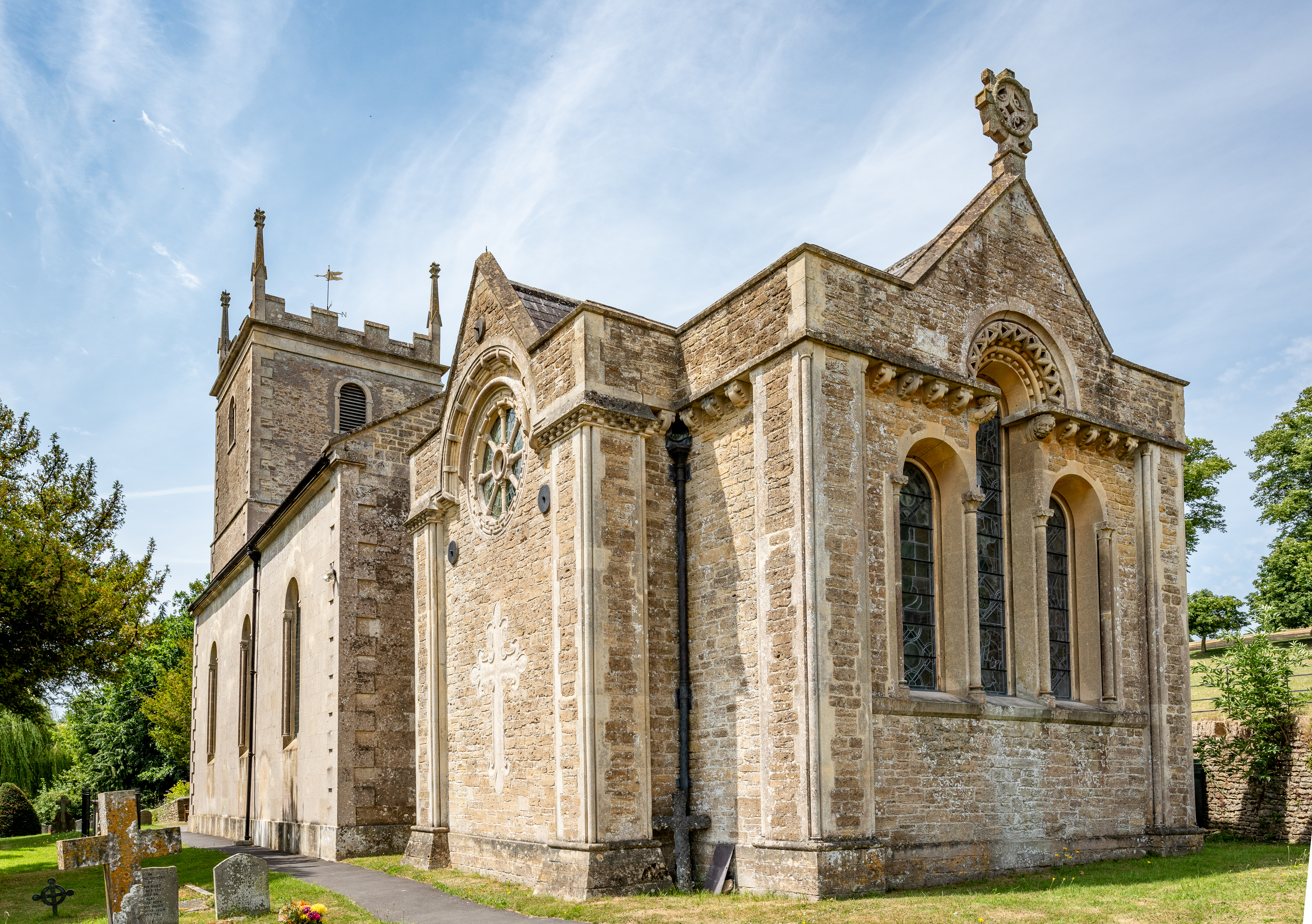
- A view from the East-South-East of St Leonard's Church

- Location within Somerset

General information
- Location: Marston Bigot, England
- Coordinates: 51.2035°N 2.3513°W
- Completed: 1789

The Church of St Leonard in Marston Bigot, Somerset, England, was built by Edmund Boyle, 7th Earl of Cork and Orrery, to replace an earlier church on another site which he had had demolished for spoiling the view from Marston House. It opened to the public in 1789. It has been designated as a Grade I listed building.

It is dedicated to Leonard of Noblac.

The nave has three bays with semi-circular headed windows with heavily enriched surrounds and an elaborate hammerbeam roof. The stained glass in the east window dates from the 15th century and is from Altenberg Abbey near Cologne, Germany. It depicts a scene from the early life of St Bernard, the driving force of the Cistercian order.

It has a tower containing a ring of eight bells, overhauled in 2003.

The church was altered in 1844 by the architect Edward Davis.

Henry Waldegrave, 11th Earl Waldegrave, was rector of the village from 1905–12, and lived in the rectory, which is also a listed building.

== See also ==
- List of Grade I listed buildings in Mendip
- List of towers in Somerset
