= Marston Bigot Park =

Marston House
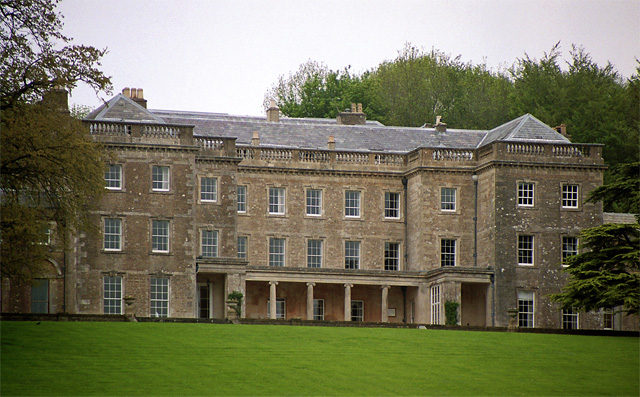
- Marston House

- Location within Somerset
- 51°12′21″N 2°20′56″W
- Location: Marston Bigot, Somerset, England

History
- Built: c. 1650
- Rebuilt: c. 1700

Listed Building – Grade II*
- Official name: Marston House
- Designated: 27 November 1972
- Reference no.: 1174802

Marston Bigot Park encompasses approximately 222 hectares (2,220,000 m^{2}) and includes Marston House, Marston Pond and the remains of the medieval shrunken village of Lower Marston. It is in the village of Marston Bigot within the English county of Somerset, England. The house is a Grade II* listed building.

== History ==
Several deserted medieval settlements are located within the park.

The earliest description of Marston House is contained in a letter from Richard Boyle, 1st Earl of Cork, in 1641, when he purchased the Manor from Sir John Hippisley. In 1714, Marston was inherited by Charles Boyle, 4th Earl of Orrery, who rebuilt it. The house later passed to John Boyle, 5th Earl of Cork, and successive generations, who each left their mark on the house and grounds, including Edmund Boyle, 7th Earl of Cork who added Marston Pond, a boathouse, and three gate lodges. However, late in the 19th century the house fell into disrepair and it was sold in 1905 to the Bonham-Christie family.

The US Army used Marston House and its grounds during World War II, and John and Angela Yeoman of Foster Yeoman Ltd finally rescued the property from dereliction in 1984, using it as the company headquarters. Foster Yeoman put the house on the market in 2012 at a price of £6 million. The house was purchased by Timothy Sanderson, Chairman and Chief Investment Officer of Sanderson Asset Management.

== Architecture ==
It is built of squared and coursed Doulting stone with a slate roof and balustraded parapet, located on a 180 metres (591 ft) long terrace with stone urns. The house is 130 metres (427 ft) long but generally only 20 metres (66 ft) deep, therefore presenting a massive facade when viewed from the park. In the three-storey central block of this front are four Ionic columns, which were built by Sir Jeffry Wyattville around 1817, with two-storey wings on either side, which were added in 1776 by Samuel Wyatt.

=== Gardens ===
The garden at Marston House is listed Grade II in the Register of Historic Parks and Gardens of special historic interest in England.

Stephen Switzer laid out the gardens between 1724 and 1745. They cover an approximately rectangular area of approximately 8.5 hectares (85,000 m^{2}). They include a rustic, rectangular-shaped, above-ground limestone grotto dating from 1743, north-east of the house near the Frome road, which was built by James Scott.

Much of the 18th century lay out is now hidden by a lake which was created in the 1820s and 1830s, as part of a restyling in the style of Capability Brown, with advice from William Sawrey Gilpin.

The lake is now used for private fishing. The farm includes a herd of 60 Hereford cattle.
