= Marston Bigot =

Village in Somerset, England

Coordinates: 51.202751°N 2.347118°W

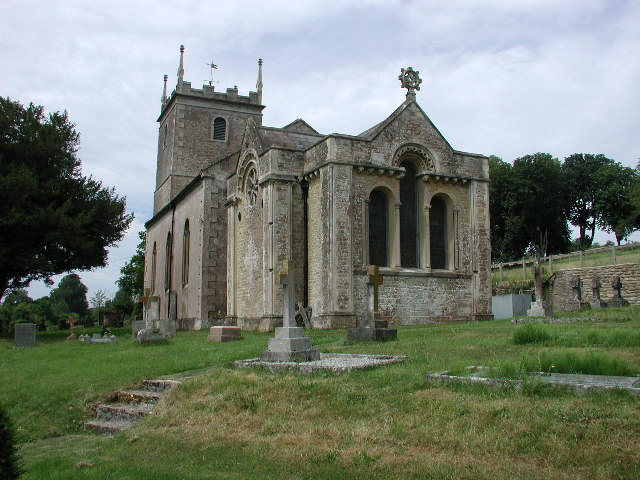
- Church of St Leonard, Marston Bigot

- Location within Somerset
- OS grid reference: ST758448
- Civil parish: Trudoxhill
- Unitary authority: Somerset Council
- Ceremonial county: Somerset
- Region: South West
- Country: England
- Sovereign state: United Kingdom
- Post town: FROME
- Postcode district: BA11
- Police: Avon and Somerset
- Fire: Devon and Somerset
- Ambulance: South Western
- UK Parliament: Frome and East Somerset

Marston Bigot is a small village and former civil parish, now in the parish of Trudoxhill in the Somerset district, in the ceremonial county of Somerset, England. It is near Nunney and 3 miles (5 km) south of Frome. In 1931 the parish had a population of 117.

== History ==
Marston Bigot was listed as "Mersitone-tora" in the Domesday Book of 1086, which gave the name of the then Saxon landowner as Robert Arundel. It became known as Marston Bigot some time after it was given by William the Conqueror to Roger de Bigod, which later became the Bigott family. The manor of Marston Bigot was held by the Crown after the execution of Lord Charles Stourton, 8th Baron Stourton in 1557. It was sold by Elizabeth I in 1596 to William Brown and James Orenge, or Orange.

The parish was part of the hundred of Frome. On 1 April 1933 the parish was abolished and merged with Nunney.

Nearby is Marston Moat, the site of a fortified manor house.

== Marston Bigot Park ==
Marston Bigot Park encompasses approximately 222 hectares (2,220,000 m^{2}) and includes Marston House, Marston Pond and the remains of the medieval shrunken village of Lower Marston.

=== House ===
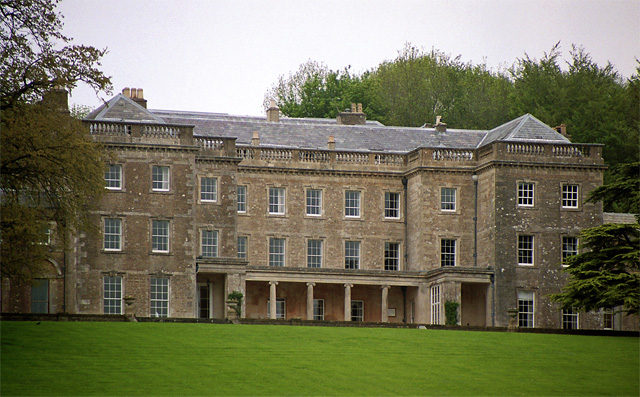
Marston House

The earliest description of Marston House is contained in a letter from Richard Boyle, 1st Earl of Cork, in 1641, when he purchased the Manor from Sir John Hippisley. In 1714, Marston was inherited by Charles Boyle, 4th Earl of Orrery, who rebuilt it. The house later passed to John Boyle, 5th Earl of Cork, and successive generations, who each left their mark on the house and grounds, including Edmund Boyle, 7th Earl of Cork who added Marston Pond, a boathouse, and three gate lodges. However late in the 19th century the house fell into disrepair and it was sold in 1905 to the Bonham-Christie family.

Marston House and its grounds were used by the US Army during World War II, and were finally rescued from dereliction in 1984 by John and Angela Yeoman of Foster Yeoman Ltd, and used as the company headquarters. Foster Yeoman put the house on the market in 2012 at a price of £6 million.

The house is a Grade II* listed building. It is built of squared and coursed Doulting stone with a slate roof and balustraded parapet, located on a 180 metres (591 ft) long terrace with stone urns. The house is 130 metres (427 ft) long but generally only 20 metres (66 ft) deep, therefore presenting a massive facade when viewed from the park. In the three-storey central block of this front are four Ionic columns, which were built by Sir Jeffry Wyattville around 1817, with two-storey wings on either side, which were added in 1776 by Samuel Wyatt.

=== Gardens ===
The garden at Marston House is listed Grade II in the Register of Parks and Gardens of Special Historic Interest in England.

The gardens were laid out by Stephen Switzer between 1724 and 1745. They cover an approximately rectangular area of approximately 8.5 hectares (85,000 m^{2}). They include a rustic, rectangular-shaped, above-ground limestone grotto dating from 1743, north-east of the house near the Frome road, which was built by James Scott.

Much of the 18th century layout is now hidden by a lake which was created in the 1820s and 1830s, as part of a restyling in the style of Capability Brown, with advice from William Sawrey Gilpin.

== Church ==
The small stone church, dedicated to St Leonard, was built on the site of an older one and was opened to the public in 1789. It has a tower containing a fine peal of eight bells. It was altered in 1844 by the architect Edward Davis. The nave has three bays with semi-circular headed windows with heavily enriched surrounds and an elaborate hammerbeam roof. It has been designated by English Heritage as a Grade I listed building. The stained glass in the east window dates from the 15th century and is from Altenberg Abbey near Cologne, Germany. It depicts a scene from the early life of St Bernard, the driving force of the Cistercian order.

Henry Waldegrave, 11th Earl Waldegrave, was rector of the village from 1905 to 1912, and lived in the rectory, which is also a listed building.
