= Swedish iron-ore industry during World War II =

Prime source of iron for Nazi Germany

Swedish iron ore was an important economic and military factor in the European theatre of World War II, as Sweden was the main contributor of iron ore to Nazi Germany. The average percentages by source of Nazi Germany’s iron ore procurement through 1933–43 by source were: Sweden: 43.0%; domestic production (Germany): 28.2%; France: 12.9%. Within the German military the Navy was most dependent on Swedish steel as an absolute necessity to the German war effort, according to their grand admiral. It has also been argued that the Swedish export helped prolong the war.

Both the Allies and the Axis were keen to gain control of the mining district in northernmost Sweden, surrounding the mining towns of Gällivare and Kiruna. The importance of this issue increased after other sources of iron were cut off from Germany by the Allied naval blockade during the Battle of the Atlantic. Both the planned Anglo-French support of Finland in the Winter War and the following German occupation of Denmark and Norway during Operation Weserübung were to a large extent motivated by the wish to deny their respective enemies iron critical for wartime production of steel.

Winston Churchill, then First Lord of the Admiralty, was particularly concerned about Swedish exports of iron ore to Germany, and pushed for the British government to take military action to end the trade. From the beginning of the war Churchill tried to persuade his cabinet colleagues to send a British fleet into the Baltic Sea to stop Swedish iron reaching Germany from the two Swedish export ports, Luleå and Oxelösund. The planned incursion was termed Project Catherine and was planned by Admiral of the Fleet William Boyle. However, other events overshadowed the incursion and it was canceled. Later, when the Baltic ports froze over and the Germans began shipping the iron ore from the Norwegian port of Narvik, Churchill pushed for the Royal Navy to mine the west coast of Norway to prevent the Germans travelling inside neutral territorial waters to escape Allied Contraband Control measures.

== Background ==
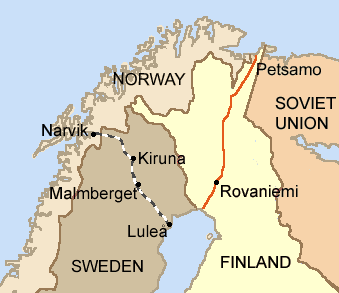
Iron ore is extracted in Kiruna and Malmberget, and brought by rail to the harbours of Luleå and Narvik. (Borders as of 1920–1940.)

At the outbreak of hostilities on 3 September 1939, Britain and France having vastly more powerful naval forces at their disposal swiftly enacted a repeat of the German naval blockade used to great effect throughout the previous war. Germany had limited natural resources and was reliant on large scale imports for a wide range of goods and raw materials, including iron ore, a steady supply of which was imperative in the creation of steel to sustain its war effort and general economy.

Prewar iron ore supplies to Germany
Source	tons (millions)
Germany	10
Sweden	9
Other	3
Total	22

In the year before the war, Germany received 22 million tons of iron ore from various sources. Although it was able to produce around 10 million tons of its own iron ore each year, it was of low grade quality and needed to be mixed with high grade material from other countries such as Sweden, which annually supplied it with 9 million tons: 7 million from Kiruna and Gällivare in Lapland and 2 million from the central Swedish ore fields north-west of Stockholm.

With the declaration of war and the start of the blockade, many sources of these foreign supplies were lost to Germany, and although it retained access to 3 million tons per annum from neutral Norway and Luxembourg, the supplies from Morocco and Spain were lost to it, and so the remaining supplies from neutral Scandinavia became of crucial importance. Grand Admiral Raeder, head of the German navy, declared that it would be "utterly impossible to make war should the navy not be able to secure the supplies of iron-ore from Sweden".

Britain, who itself imported large quantities of iron ore, was fully aware of the Swedish exports to Germany and through its system of Contraband Control was routinely stopping ships of all nations to ensure they were not delivering important supplies to the Germans. To counter the allied blockade, Germany embarked upon a system of unrestricted submarine warfare whereby Allied and neutral ships could be attacked without warning. As a result, during the first nine months of the war a large number of neutral ships were sunk with considerable loss of life by the Germans.

While the Allies were keen to maintain the moral high ground and stressed at every opportunity the difference in impact between their approach compared to their enemy's, they were mindful that many neutral mariners (including those of Sweden) relied upon the trade with Nazi Germany for their livelihoods, and so during the opening stages of the war they were careful not to be too strict with non-combatant vessels for fear the blockade would alienate neutral nations into joining the war on the side of Germany.

== Iron ore routes ==
There were two main routes by which iron ore was shipped to Germany from Sweden.

=== The Eastern Route ===
Annually from May to November, ore from the Northern region was shipped from the port of Luleå down the Gulf of Bothnia to the German north Baltic ports at Lübeck, Swinemünde, and Stettin. Outside these months, the Gulf of Bothnia froze over, severely restricting supplies, and although an alternate port was available at Oxelösund, south of Stockholm, for the transport of iron ore from the mines in Bergslagen, this facility was unable to supply the full amount required by Germany, and in any case froze over from January to March each year. Luleå remained outside the reach of Royal Navy's patrols but it was estimated that when Luleå and the Baltic ports of Oxelösund and Gävle were open it could only supply around 8 million tons, or less than half pre-war imports.

This meant that during the early winter months of the war, due to the thick ice, Germany had no choice other than to transport the majority of its ore by rail to Narvik Station and then by ship along Norway's heavily indented Western coast to Germany, a much more circuitous route than the one available during warmer months.

=== The Western Route ===
The port of Narvik, high above the Arctic Circle was open for iron ore shipments all year round. But the stormy Atlantic coast of Norway also provided another extremely useful geological feature for Germany in its attempts to continue shipping the ore and beating the allied blockade.

Immediately offshore from Norway's western coast lies the Skjaergaard (Skjærgård), a continuous chain of some 50,000 glacially formed skerries ('small uninhabited islands') sea stacks and rocks running parallel to the shore. A partially hidden sea lane (which Churchill called the Norwegian Corridor) exists in the area between this rocky fringe and the coastal landmass proper. Inside this protected channel it is possible to navigate the entire 1,600 kilometres (990 mi) length of the Norwegian coast from North Cape to Stavanger. Such coastlines, sometimes known as Leads – a rough English translation for the common Norwegian nautical term Ledene ('shipping lane') are common around Scandinavia – Skjaergaard also exist along the Swedish and Finnish Baltic coasts and off Greenland.

The Germans made great use of the Norwegian Corridor to avoid the attention of the vigilant Royal Navy and RAF. In the winter of 1939–1940 a steady stream of their specially-constructed iron ore vessels made the long trip south from Narvik, sometimes within the three-mile curtilage of neutral Norwegian territorial waters, sometimes just outside if the way appeared hazardous or the sea particularly turbulent. At the southernmost point the iron ore captains had to make a choice:

1. Follow the Skjaergaard around the coasts of Norway and Sweden, down through the Kattegat and finally into the north German and Baltic ports of Lubeck and Stettin. This route was safer because it brought them much closer to the protection of the German naval patrols and Luftwaffe air cover but involved hauling the very bulky and heavy iron ore the long way overland to the industrial centres on the overburdened German railway system.
2. Leave the safety of the Skjaergaard and make a dash south across the Skagerrak (the sea channel north of the Danish Jutland peninsula), and hurry down the west coast of Denmark to Hamburg and Bremen. This was the preferred route because it allowed the ore to be taken straight along the efficient inland waterways to the industrial heartlands of the Ruhr and the Rhineland where it could be processed. It was much more hazardous, putting the ships and their cargo at the mercy of allied submarines and patrolling destroyers of the Contraband Control. A number of German ships were sunk in this area.

== British attempts to disrupt trade ==
From the beginning of the war, Winston Churchill expended considerable energies trying to persuade his colleagues in the British government to take action to stop the iron ore traffic. On 16 December 1939 he issued a memo to the cabinet:

It must be understood that an adequate supply of Swedish iron ore is vital to Germany…the effectual stoppage of the Norwegian ore supplies to Germany ranks as a major offensive operation of the war. No other measure is open to us for many months to come which gives so good a chance of abridging the waste and destruction of the conflict, or of perhaps preventing the vast slaughters which will attend the grapple of the main armies. The ore from Luleå (in the Baltic) is already stopped by the winter ice, which must not be broken by the Soviet ice-breaker, should the attempt be made. The ore from Narvik must be stopped by laying successively a series of small minefields in Norwegian territorial waters at the two or three suitable points on the coast, which will force the ships carrying ore to Germany to quit territorial waters and come on to the high seas, where, if German, they will be taken as prize, or, if neutral, subjected to our contraband control.

Although in late 1939 many of Churchill's cabinet colleagues agreed with the need to take action to disrupt the iron ore traffic, they decided against the use of mines. At the time negotiations into the British chartering of the entire Norwegian mercantile shipping fleet were at a delicate stage and the British Foreign Office made convincing arguments against infringing upon Norway's neutrality. In 1915 the British government had issued an apology to the Norwegian government for a violation of her territorial waters by British warships who seized a German steamer inside the three-mile nautical limit. Near the end of World War I the British, Americans and French had induced the Norwegians to allow the Skjaergaard to be mined in order to prevent German ships and submarines from using their territorial waters as a way around the Great North Sea Mine Barrage, a massive minefield laid from Scotland to Norway as part of the earlier Allied blockade strategy.

Yet another diplomatic dispute over foreign incursions in Norway's territorial waters broke out in February 1940 between the respective governments of Britain, Norway and Germany following the Altmark Incident. A German tanker carrying British prisoners of war, the Altmark, attempting to return home via the cover of the Norwegian Corridor, was spotted by British aircraft on 14 February 1940 and pursued by a British destroyer flotilla, on personal orders from Churchill. On the evening of 16–17 February, a British boarding party from the destroyer Cossack, freed 299 British naval prisoners of war from the Altmark, which had been seeking safety in the Jøssingfjorden.

On the evening of 21 March 1940 the British submarine HMS Ursula, (which had attacked the German cruiser Leipzig, sinking one of her escorts, destroyer F9, in Heligoland Bight the previous December) intercepted the German iron ore ship Hedderheim, en route from Narvik, and sank her eight miles off the coast of Denmark, although the crew were all rescued. At the time it was seen as an early indication that Britain was at last taking steps to end the iron trade and over the next few days several other German ships were sunk at the entrance to the Baltic. Following reports that strong British destroyer and submarine forces were stationed in the Skagerrak, Berlin ordered all her ships along the iron ore route to port immediately.

By now it was clear to all concerned that the Phoney War was about to end. Antagonised by the German mining of their own waters with deadly new magnetic mines and a general concern that Germany was managing to overcome the worst effects of the blockade, the Supreme War Council met in London on 28 March 1940 to discuss an intensification of the economic warfare strategy.

Finally, on 3 April the War Cabinet gave authorisation for the mining of the Skjaergaard. On the morning of Monday 8 April 1940 the British informed the Norwegian authorities of its intentions and carried out Operation Wilfred. However, by the time it took place German preparations for the German invasion of Norway were well under way and because of this only one minefield was actually laid, in the mouth of Vestfjord leading directly to Narvik.

== After the invasion of Norway ==
Despite warnings from a number of Allied and neutral sources about the imminent invasion, the Norwegians were caught largely unprepared, and on 9 April 1940 the Germans began landing troops in the main Norwegian settlements of Stavanger, Oslo, Trondheim, Bergen and Narvik. The British and French made attempts to assist the Norwegians, landing considerable forces at Narvik on 14 April and fighting fierce naval engagements off the coast. Further Allied landings took place between 18 and 23 April (the Battle of Narvik), but the Germans had already taken too firm a foothold, and the Norwegian government surrendered on 9 June 1940. The railway traversed the significant Norddal Bridge, which was rigged to be blown up in case of war. There was an attempt to blow up this bridge on 14 April, but lack of expertise and of explosives meant that the damages were not so large and it was repaired fairly quickly and was used for ore transport throughout the war.

The production ore in the Kiruna mine declined sharply in 1939 and 1940. The battles of Narvik and the ensuing destruction of much of the port along with the sinking of cargo ships anchored there contributed to this decline. Further, cargo ships leaving Narvik could be sunk by the Allies as Britain had declared iron ore a contraband product. From its height in 1937 to 1940 production of iron ore in Kiruna mine dropped from 7 to 3 million tons.

Soon after the Germans fully occupied Norway they began pressing Sweden to allow unarmed German troops to travel on the Swedish railway system to and from Norway on leave. On 8 July 1940 an agreement on this traffic was reached.

The supplies of iron ore continued to be shipped to Germany, often under Swedish naval protection through the Baltic and in some cases in Swedish transport ships. After the German invasion of Russia, Soviet submarines attempted to sink iron ore ships in the Baltic sea, sinking the Swedish passenger liner, Hansa, on 24 November 1944, causing 84 deaths including children. Transport of ore to Germany through the port of Luleå ended in 1944.

To avoid mass firing as iron ore production declined during the war LKAB workers were kept busy extracting waste rock and some were allowed to retire with pensions before schedule.

== The Swedish position ==
Sweden was able to remain neutral throughout the war. According to Erik Boheman, the State Secretary for Foreign Affairs during the war, the main reasons were luck and the development of the war, in combination with the Swedish people's spirit to resist an invasion, and perhaps also some diplomatic skillfulness.

Sweden also sought to maintain its traditional ties with the Western democracies. The Allied blockade of Europe and the German counter blockade of the Baltic prevented all but the bare minimum of commodities such as oil reaching Sweden from the West, but despite the Allies' sympathy with Sweden's position, there was a general belief among the American and British governments that Sweden went too far in collaborating with the Nazi regime.

The Allies noted that without the Swedish iron ore, the German war effort would grind to a halt because not only was the ore being sent in large quantities but it was also of very high quality, making German steel manufacture extremely efficient. The US military was also appalled at Sweden for escorting German ships, allowing use of its own ships to transport the ore and for its failure to stop the transit of German soldiers and war materials across its territory.

After America joined the blockade against the Axis forces and assisted in the economic warfare measures already being implemented by the British in early 1942, efforts were made to stop the Swedish iron ore trade and to reduce the practical help it was giving to Germany, although these attempts initially did nothing to reduce the German war effort.

== Later Allied pressure on Sweden ==
During the last half of 1943 and the early months of 1944, the US sought to cripple Germany's ability to continue the war by carrying out a concentrated and costly bombing campaign against ball bearing production in Germany combined with trade negotiations, including preclusive purchasing arrangements, intended to cut off Swedish ball bearings to Germany. Despite the bombing, German industrial countermeasures and improvisations warded off any serious consequences, and an Allied agreement with Sweden in September 1943 to halt exports of ball bearings neglected to impose restrictions on exports of the high-quality steel used in their manufacture. This allowed Sweden to continue to provide Germany with ball-bearing steel, largely offsetting the drop in the Swedish export of finished ball bearings.

After the tide of battle on the eastern front had irreversibly shifted following German defeats at El Alemein, Stalingrad and Kursk in the winter and summer of 1943, the Soviet Union, at the Moscow Conference of Foreign Ministers in October 1943, took the lead in suggesting a more active role for Sweden in the War, such as by allowing the establishment of Allied air bases in its territory. Although the Allies decided not to call on Sweden to declare war on Germany, Churchill believed that the War might be brought to an early end if Sweden (and Turkey which provided Germany with chromite ore) entered it on the Allied side in order to confront Hitler on additional fronts.

Although Sweden did not enter the fight, they later agreed to cancel the transit of German military material and troops across Sweden, to further reduce iron ore exports, end Swedish naval escorting of German ships in the Baltic, and reduce ball bearing exports. In exchange, Britain and the US agreed to a relaxation of the blockade to allow Sweden to import certain important commodities, including rubber and oil. The ongoing diplomatic pressure, together with the deteriorating German military position gradually persuaded Sweden to reduce and ultimately end its trade with Germany by November 1944.

== Post-war recovery ==
Iron mining in northern Sweden began to recover in the autumn of 1946 with a series of shipments to England. Production was further secured with LKAB signing a contract with Bethlehem Steel the same year. By the early 1950s annual ore production had the same tonnage as in the best years of the 1930s.

== See also ==
- Franco-British plans for intervention in the Winter War
- Malmbanan
- Swedish overseas trade during World War II
- Military production during World War II
- British submarine flotilla in the Baltic (World War I)

== Sources ==
- Shirer, William Lawrence (1960). The Rise and Fall of the Third Reich: A History of Nazi Germany. New York City: Simon & Schuster. ASIN B0766DKDLR. LCCN 60006729. OCLC 1286630. OL 5794925M. Wikidata Q138029595.
