= Richard Pratt (Ripon MP) =

16th-century English politician

Richard Pratt (fl. 1563) was an English politician.

He was a member (MP) of the parliament of England for Ripon in 1563.

Parliament of England
Preceded by Francis Kempe; John Sapcote	Member of Parliament for Ripon; 1563; With: George Leighe	Succeeded by Martin Birkhead; Anthony Roane
