= Peter Yorke (MP) =

16th-century English politician

Peter Yorke (or Peter York) (c. 1542 – by 1589), of Gouthwaite, Yorkshire, was an English landowner and politician.

Peter Yorke was the son of Sir John Yorke (c.1490-1568) and Anne Smyth. He was educated at Peterhouse, Cambridge and admitted to the Middle Temple in 1557. In 1560 he married Elizabeth, daughter of Sir William Ingleby of Ripley Castle, and they moved to Parcevall Hall, part of the manor of Appletreewick, a former possession of Bolton Priory bought by Peter's father in 1549. When his father died in 1568 he inherited the extensive former Byland Abbey estates in Nidderdale, which his father had bought in 1547, as well as Appletreewick manor, which included valuable mining rights at Greenhow Hill.

He was a Member (MP) of the Parliament of England for Ripon in 1589.

In his will, proved on 4 July 1589, Yorke left most of his estates to his eldest son John.

Parliament of England
Preceded by William Spencer; Samuel Sandys	Member of Parliament for Ripon; 1589; With: William Smith	Succeeded by Anthony Wingfield; William Bennet
