= William Aislabie =

William Aislabie may refer to:

- William Aislabie (governor) (died 1725), governor of Bombay, 1708–1715
- William Aislabie (1700–1781), Member of Parliament for Ripon, 1721–1781
- William Aislabie (1671–1725), his uncle, also Member of Parliament for Ripon, 1719–1722
- William Aislabie (died 1773), cousin of William Aislabie (1700–1781), also Member of Parliament for Ripon, 1727–1734
