= Stephen Proctor =

English courtier (??–1619)

Stephen Proctor or Procter (died 1619) was an English courtier, a minerals and financial speculator, and Yorkshire landowner who built Fountains Hall.

== Life ==
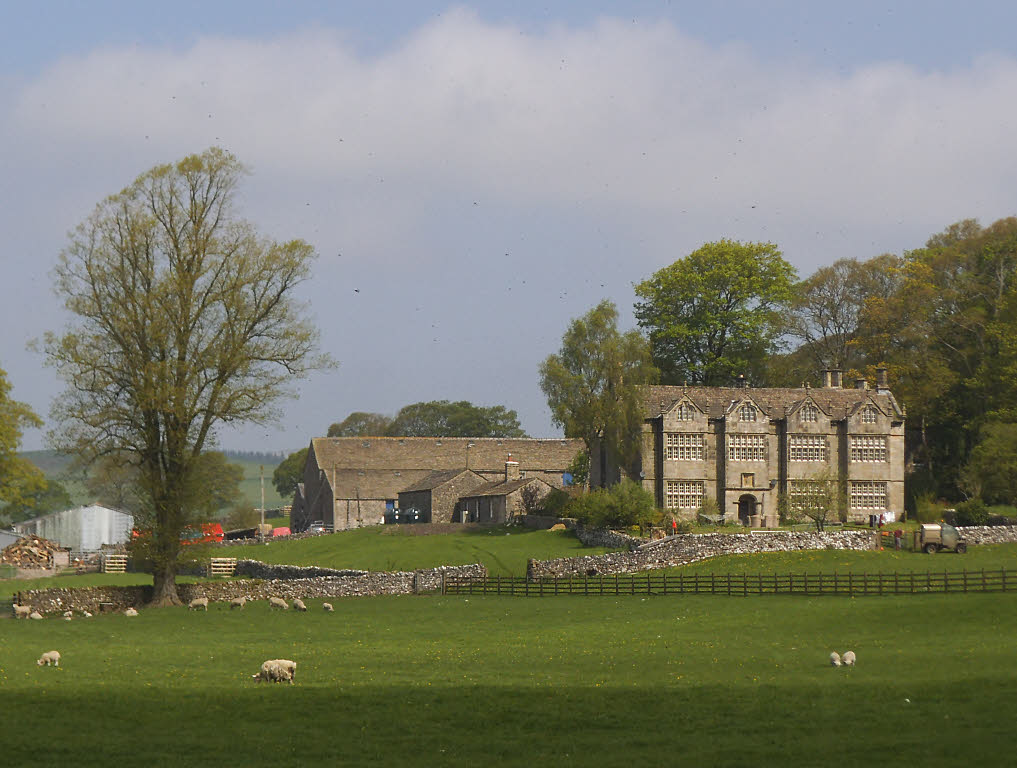
Friar's Head Hall, Flasby with Winterburn (rebuilt in the 17th century).

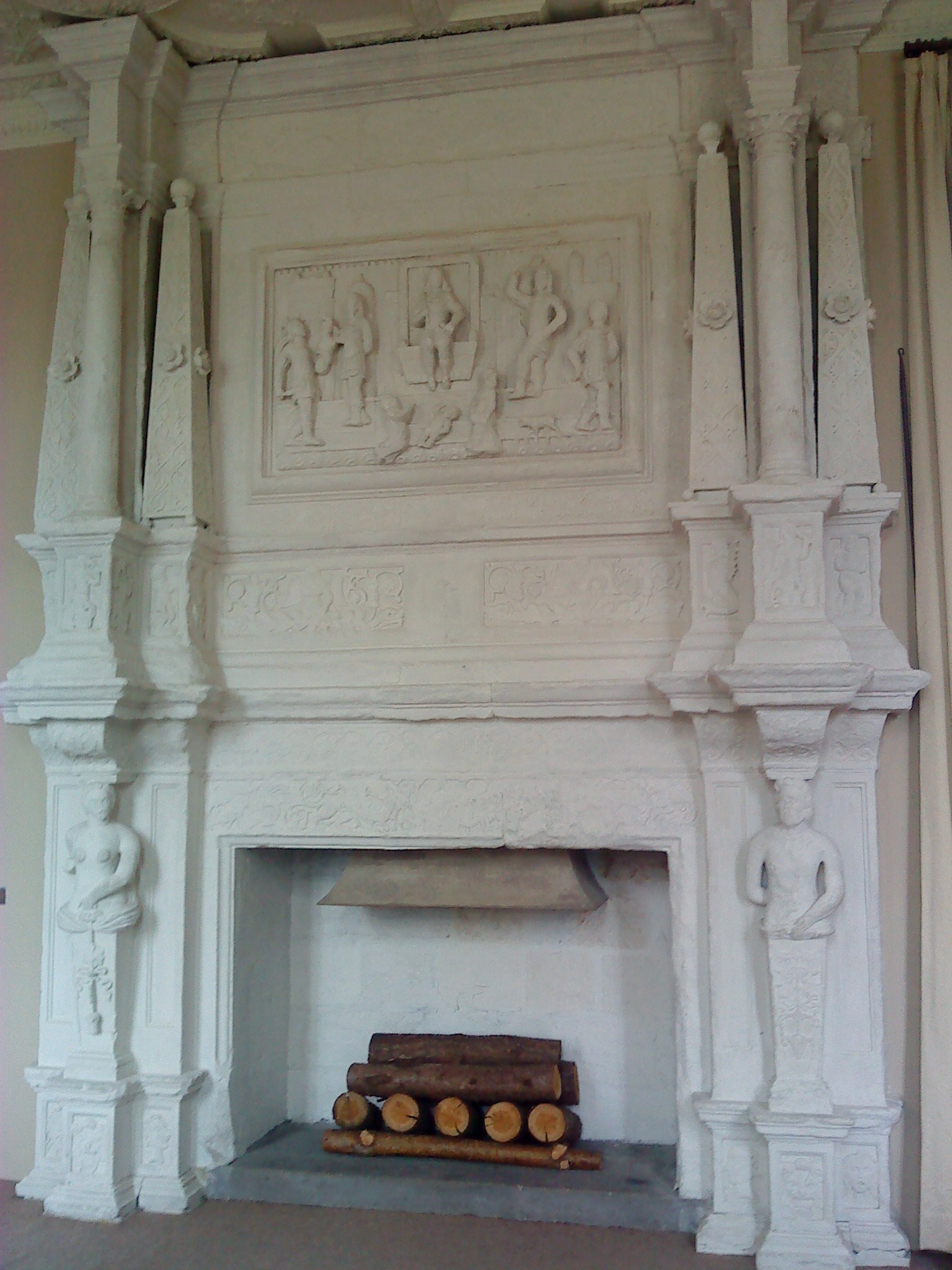
Fireplace at Fountains Hall with the Judgement of Solomon

Proctor was a member of a family from Ripon and Friar's Head and Cowper Cote at Gargrave. In 1513, Stephen and Ralph and Roger Proctor of Flasby were mentioned in the Flodden muster. Gabriel Proctor was the receiver of Flasby and other manors (formerly the property of Furness Abbey) for the Duchy of Lancaster in 1556, when the Earl of Cumberland's servants attacked his family during a territorial dispute.

His father, Thomas Proctor (or Procter) is sometimes said to have made a fortune from a 1589 patent to smelt iron with wood, and he is known to have been a lead-mining entrepreneur. The iron patent was sold to Edward Fitton in 1592 and he later complained that it was worthless. In the 1540s, Thomas Proctor leased lead mines from Sir Arthur Darcy on Appletreewick Moors formerly the property of Bolton Abbey. The mines were operated by a consortium of merchants from York who sent the ore to Flanders and paid a rent to Proctor. This phase of business came to an end in 1549 when Sir John Yorke bought the manor of Appletreewick and evicted Proctor, his tenants, and his workers. A Chancery case over the crown lease of the Appletreewick (Greenhow) lead mines resulted, between John Yorke, knight, and Thomas Proctor of Cowpercote, yeoman.

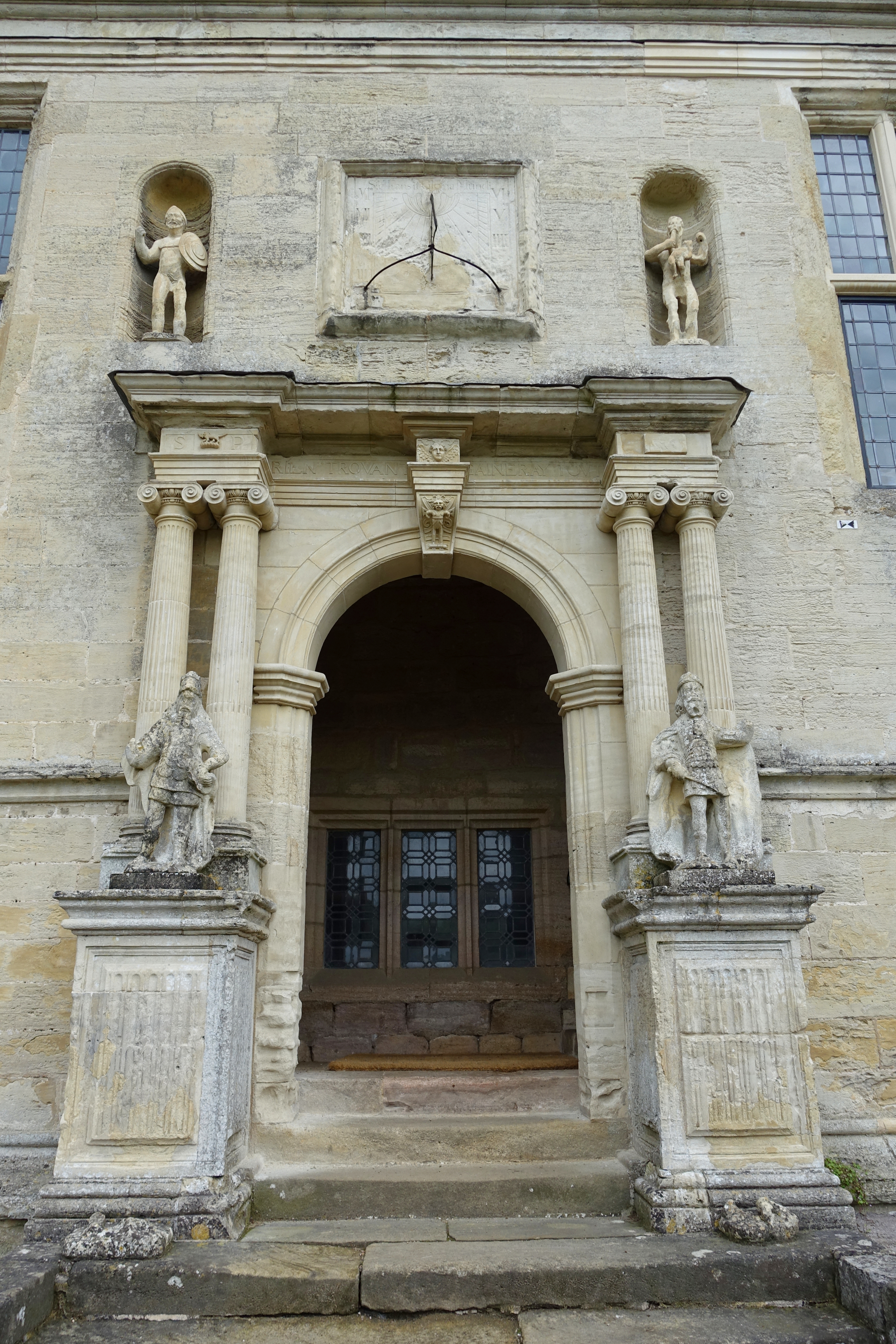
Statues of Mars and Saturn in niches at Fountains Hall

Stephen and his brother Elias Proctor were involved in some aspects of a family iron business, and Stephen's father-in-law, the court musician Ralph Green was an investor. For a time, they had a bloomery at Shipley and used a forge at Summerbridge, not far from the medieval iron-working site of Smelthouses. They used ironstone brought from Gildersome rather than any more local source. A blast furnace constructed at Shipley proved unsuccessful. Stephen Procter gained a patent from Elizabeth I for coal and ironstone at Fulwood, near modern-day Huthwaite.

Before he bought the Fountains estate, Proctor lived at Warsill Grange, and at Westminster. Fountains Hall was built partly using stone taken from Fountains Abbey in the late 1590s after Proctor acquired the estate from Thomas and William Gresham for £4,500. The inclusion of the lands of Bewerley, with its lucrative lead mines, in his purchase was disputed. Rivalry between landowners in exploiting the mineral resources of former monastic lands became the determinant of his career. Proctor placed a placed an image of Saturn on Fountains Hall, a planet associated with melancholy and the metallic element lead, and a figure of Mars, representing iron.

Thomas Proctor, probably his brother, lived at Cowper Cote in 1601, and was appointed a collector of the tax or subsidy. Stephen Proctor was knighted by James VI and I in March 1604. He was admitted to Gray's Inn in November 1605. Prince Charles travelled to London from Dunfermline Palace with his physician Henry Atkins in July 1604 and they stopped at Fountains Hall.

Proctor worked on the leases of William Stanley, 6th Earl of Derby following an inheritance dispute, and supported Robert Cecil to gather and improve crown revenue from lands and woods. The King gave Proctor "free gifts" of money in 1609 and 1610.

== Religion and country house drama ==
An author, Thomas Bell, formerly a Catholic, after his conversion dedicated his Christian Dialogue (1609) to members of the Yorkshire Puritan gentry, including Proctor, Timothy Whittingham, Timothy Hutton, and the exchequer official Vincent Skinner.

Proctor argued with William Ingleby, who sided with tenants and villagers at Kirkby Malzeard who dismantled his enclosure made on the common land of Grewelthorpe Moor where he had commenced mining for coal. The village activists included 31 women led by Dorothy Bayne, known as Captain Bayne. Proctor's title was strengthened by a deal made by the Earl of Derby. Proctor had captured a priest, Christopher Wharton, within Ingleby's park at Ripley Castle in 1598.

Proctor seems to have been anxious about his neighbour's religious beliefs, suspecting that Sir John Mallory supported a Catholic seminary in Studley Royal Park. A convicted and condemned burglar, David Paler or Paley, in prison at York Castle, alleged that Mallory pretended that he hosted priests in his park, so that his keepers could accidentally kill Proctor as a poacher, if he came to investigate at night. Paler mentioned other enemies, and Proctor's involvement with properties having disputed title due to the Earl of Derby's inheritance.

In August 1609, Proctor and Timothy Whittingham were involved in the capture of the Catholics John Mush and Matthew Flathers at Upsall Castle. Proctor investigated Sir John Yorke (1566–1635) of Nidderdale and Gowlthwaite Hall (a relation of William Ingleby) after hearing of theatrical performances of recusant character by the Simpson family at Christmas 1609 and Candlemas 1610. The first informer was Elizabeth Stubbs, a former servant at Gowlthwaite, or her husband, the minister William Stubbes. Proctor alleged that Yorke's servants danced to a piper in the churchyard on the Sabbath, claiming that with "theire piping and revellinge wolde make such a noyse in time of praier, as the mynyster colde not well be h[e]arde". Charges against Yorke grew into complicity in the Gunpowder Plot. Proctor also said that he had disrupted Prince Charles's visit to Fountains. Eventually, Yorke was heavily fined by the Star Chamber for hosting the players.

Amongst the evidence, there is a suggestion that Proctor had seen the players perform, and perhaps a Saint Christopher play with suitable adjustments was played at Gowlthwaite and a house of the Danby family. The performances were said to have included a dispute between a Catholic priest and a Protestant minister, which was the main focus of the prosecution, as the direct presentation of religious controversy on the stage was forbidden by statute.

One actor, William Harrison, said he had played the clown's parts in King Lear and Pericles, possibly both recently published plays by William Shakespeare, or the anonymous King Leir, an Elizabethan version of the Leir story. It has been argued that the themes of the anonymous play might have better suited a recusant audience. Another play mentioned was The Travels of the Three English Brothers, a biopic based on the Shirley family, recently performed in London by Queen Anne's Men at the Red Bull Theatre.

The actors, led by Christopher Simpson (the elder), were said to have been members of Richard Cholmely of Roxby and Brandsby's company, though there is some doubt if he really was their active patron. In November 1609, Cholmeley had been caught harbouring two Jesuits John Hutton and Cuthbert Johnston. On this occasion, Anne of Denmark interceded with King James for bestowing the gift of his forfeit, which was obtained by the Earl of Montgomery, and Cholmeley was able to compound for a pardon.

=== The Yorke family ===
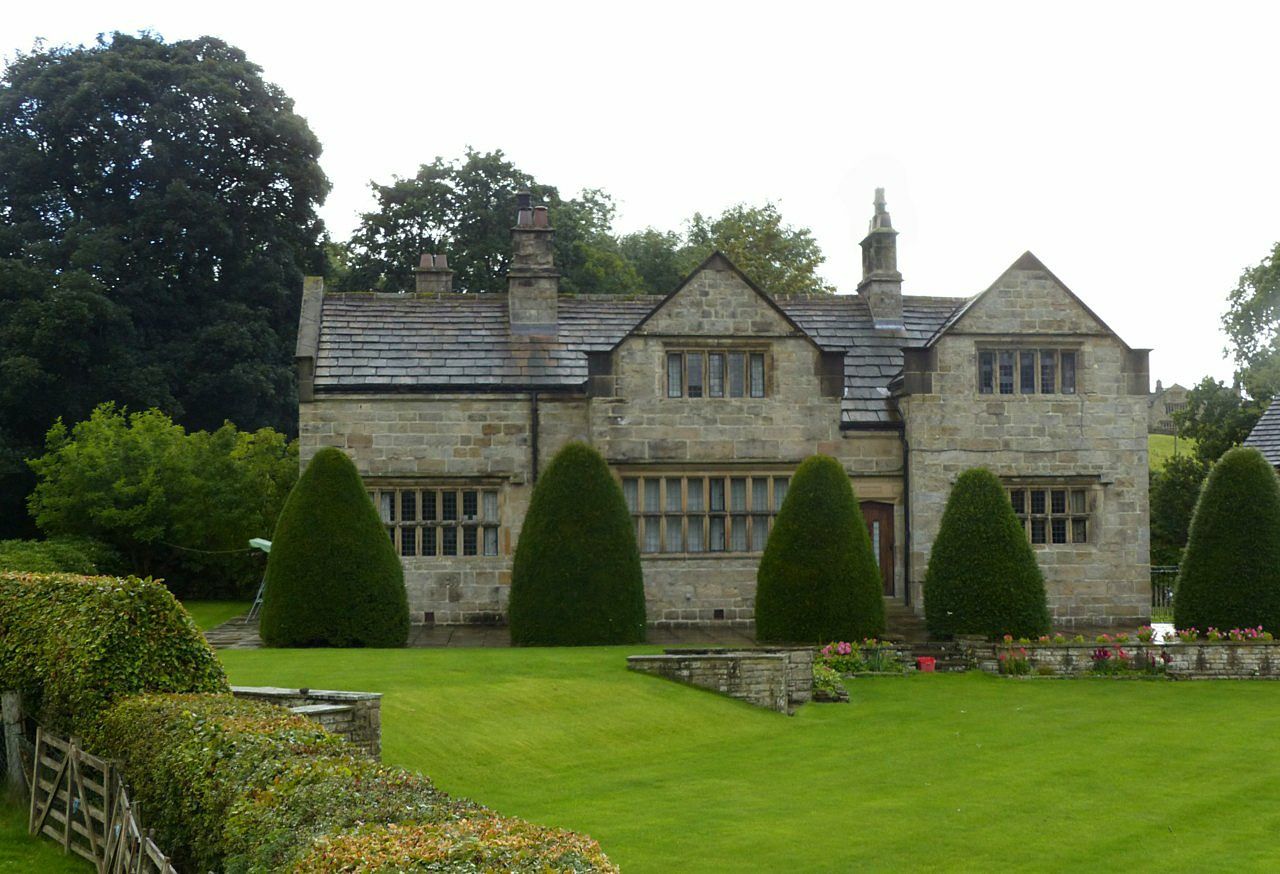
Gowlthwaite Hall, moved and restored when a reservoir was made

John Yorke's grandfather, also John Yorke, had been Master of the Mint in London. His wife, Julian Hansby, was a great aunt of the diarist Alice Thornton. John Yorke's executors included Christopher Wandesford. He left Gowlthwaithe to a nephew, also called John Yorke, who maintained court connections. His first wife, Florence Sharpe was from Westmorland. Two of their daughters were married to Scottish courtiers, Elizabeth to James Leslie, Lord Lindores, and Jane to David Leslie, 1st Lord Newark. Their father had contributed to the 1594 masque at the baptism of Prince Henry at Stirling Castle. John Yorke's son by his second marriage to Katherine Daniel, also John Yorke, was Member of Parliament for Richmond. Katherine was a daughter of Sir Ingleby Daniel of Beswick and a sister of the poet George Daniel (1616–1657). His verse, written in response to the crisis that became the Bishops' Wars, is modelled on the themes of the Stuart court masque.

== Collector of fines ==
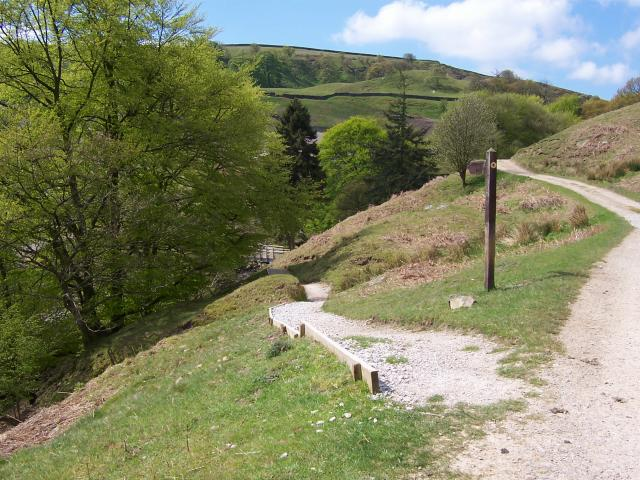
Proctor was a rival of John Yorke to exploit lead mines at Ashfold Side, Nidderdale Way

Stephen Proctor promoted a scheme to collect fines and customs due to the King, alleging that local officials and Sheriffs and were corrupt. His solution would be to have paid informers. He petitioned Anne of Denmark to intervene in his favour. He had formed a connection with her household. Around the year 1606 he met Anne of Denmark's servant, Zachary Bethell (a wardrobe servant who produced the queen's masques), to solicit a meeting with her to discuss in person "some matters of good importance that yet you have not heard of".

Francis Bacon approved his project to collect fines. Proctor was made collector and receiver of penal fines in July 1609. His schemes attracted censure for their own "vexatious abuses", and apparent oppression of the people, and he accumulated a substantial debt. He was made to answer a committee of the House of Commons in March 1610, and was a prisoner in the Tower of London in July.

Proctor defended his actions in the Fountains district, in typical terms of the period, claiming to have provided employment to "a great number of workmen", and by the development of mines "a great relief to the poor inhabitants of that vast and mountainous country". In 1619, Stephen Atkinson used similar phrases to praise the work of the gold prospector Cornelius de Vos in Scotland.

Proctor was alleged to have slandered the Earl of Northampton as a partaker in the Gunpowder Plot, alleging that he concealed knowledge of the involvement of William Ingleby of Ripley and John Yorke with the conspiracy. He also accused Yorke of having harboured the Jesuit John Gerard, and installing priest holes at Gowlthwaite. Yorke was thought to have persuaded Anthony Bowlyn, a servant of the clerk of the King's kitchen, to spread the rumour in 1612. In February 1614, according to John Chamberlain, Proctor was convicted in the Star Chamber for criminal schemes against two Yorkshire landowners and other offences, and sentenced to the pillory, imprisonment, and a fine of £3,000.

=== Murder by riot ===
Proctor brought in specialists to build an "engine" to drain his lead mines on Bewerley Moor, a former Abbey Grange, near modern Greenhow. Further troubles included a case of "horrible riot" at these leadworks and the subsequent death of a man called Wetherall. Proctor intended to pursue this case in 1618, against the Armitage and Darnbrooke families. They had previously raised a Chancery case against the occupation of the Bewerley mines by Procter and his business partner Lambwell or Lemuell Knowles alias Dobson of Methley. The death was classed as a "murder by riot". The site, originally developed by Byland Abbey, was bought by Mary Yorke (widow of the MP) in 1674, and later developed as the Prosperous Lead Mine. The Yorke family had long had an interest in lead at Bewerley, on the north side of Ashfold Side Gill. Proctor had bought the royalties and Armitage family interest in 1613.

== Marriage and children ==
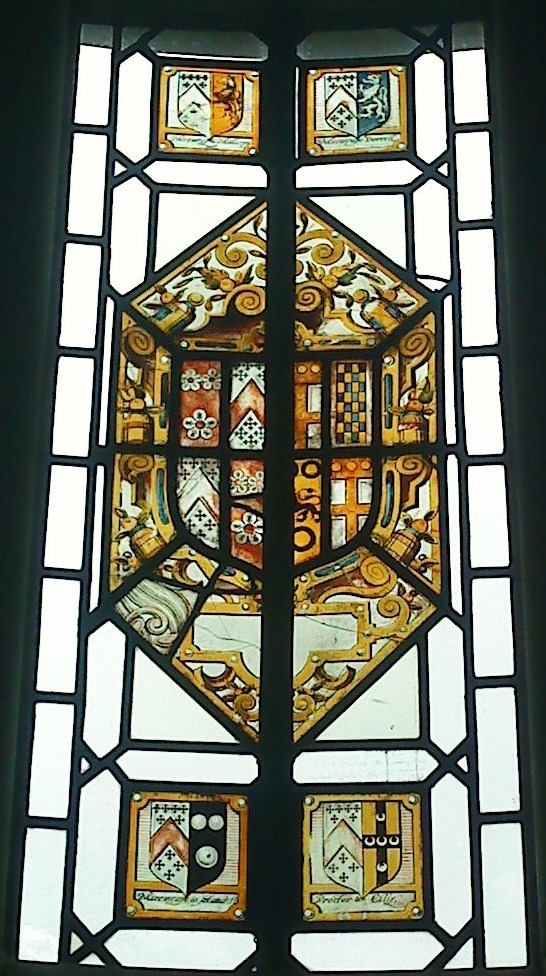
Stained glass by Bernard Dininckhoff at Fountains Hall

Proctor married Honor Green (died 1625), a daughter of Ralph Green (died 1599) who was a court musician to Elizabeth I playing the sackbut. Stained-glass windows installed by the Proctors at Fountains Hall evoked a long ancestry and affinity for both the Green and Proctor families. The heraldry was painted by a German artist resident in York, Baernard Dininckhoff. The extent and original arrangement of the glass is unclear, and the intended display of family pedigree and ancient alliances was perhaps optimistic. Proctor established a connection with an old family called Mirewray, known from the records of Furness Abbey. The inclusion of the arms of Francis Clifford, 4th Earl of Cumberland, with whom Proctor quarrelled, may have been a conciliatory gesture. The arms connected with the Green family shed no clear light on Honor Proctor's family, but can be connected with heraldry used by a relation of Henry Green, Chief Justice at St Peter's Church, Lowick.

Their children included:

- Deborah Proctor, who married Thomas Jackson of Cowling Hall.
- Priscilla Proctor (died 1622), who married George Dawson of Azerley in April 1610.
- Beatrice Proctor (died 1622), who married Stephen Pudsey of Arnforth
- Honor Proctor, who married Broythwell or Brochwel Lloyd, and was the mother of the military engineer Charles Lloyd of Leighton in Worthen (died 1661), who worked on the defences of Berwick-upon-Tweed in 1639. The Scottish General of Artillery, Alexander Hamilton, sent a spy to observe his progress.
- A daughter who married George Reresby,

After Stephen Proctor died, Honor Proctor lived at Cowling Hall with her daughter Deborah. Honor Proctor sold the Fountains estate to Timothy Whittingham in 1623. He had been a business associate of her husband. Whittingham sold it on to Humphrey Wharton of Gillingwood Hall, who sold it to Richard Ewens of South Cowton, a younger brother of Anne of Denmark's auditor Ralph Ewens, and his son-in-law John Messenger.

The 1625 will of Honor Proctor includes furnishings used at Fountains and at Cowling, a chest of viols and a pair of virginals, portraits of Will Sommers and Jane Shore, and a larger picture of Elizabeth I which she bequeathed to "Lady Darcy" (possibly Mary Belasyse, a granddaughter of Henry Cholmely). Honor Proctor's clothing included a "pair of French bodies of taffeta".
