= William Bennet (MP for Ripon) =

English politician

- Born: after 1553
- Died: February 1609
- Occupation: Member of Parliament

William Bennet (after 1553 – February 1609), of Marlborough, Wiltshire, was an English politician.

== Education ==
He was educated at John Roysse's Free School in Abingdon, (now Abingdon School). He was later a student of Gray's Inn.

== Career ==
William Bennet was a Member (MP) of the Parliament of England for Ripon in 1593.

He was a co-founder of Pembroke College, Oxford.

== Death and legacy ==
He died in February 1609 and left lands to Christ's Hospital of Abingdon.

He was the founder of the Bennet scholarship at Abingdon School which in his will, dated 29 Dec. 1608, made provision for the free education and apprenticeship of six poor boys of Abingdon, to be known as Bennet boys. The regulations for the Bennet Boys were set up on 30 November 1609 by his uncle Thomas Tesdale and his brother Ralph Bennett. The Bennet Boys existed from 1609 until 1870.

His brother John Bennet succeeded him as the MP for Ripon.

Parliament of England
Preceded by Peter York; William Smith	Member of Parliament for Ripon; 1593; With: Anthony Wingfield	Succeeded by Sir John Bennett; Christopher Perkins

== See also ==
- List of Old Abingdonians
