= John Yorke =

John Yorke may refer to:

- John Yorke (Master of the Mint) (c.1490-1569), English merchant and Member of Parliament for Boroughbridge
- John Yorke (c.1566–1634), English recusant landowner
- John Yorke (1633–1663), British Member of Parliament for Richmond
- John Yorke (1685–1757), British Member of Parliament for Richmond
- John Yorke (1728–1801), British Member of Parliament for Reigate and Higham Ferrers
- John Yorke (British Army officer) (1814–1890), British general
- John Yorke (Conservative politician) (1836–1912), English landowner and Conservative politician
- John Yorke, 7th Earl of Hardwicke (1840–1909), British naval commander
- John Yorke (producer), BBC television producer

== See also ==
- John York (disambiguation)
