= Marmaduke Wyvill (MP for Ripon) =

16th-century English politician

Marmaduke Wyvill (by 1496 – 1558), of Little Burton, Yorkshire, was an English politician.

== Political career ==
He was a member (MP) of the parliament of England for Ripon in October 1553.

Parliament of England
Preceded by ? ?	Member of Parliament for Ripon; Oct. 1553; With: Edward Beseley	Succeeded by William Rastell; John Temple
