= Baron Headley =

British noble family

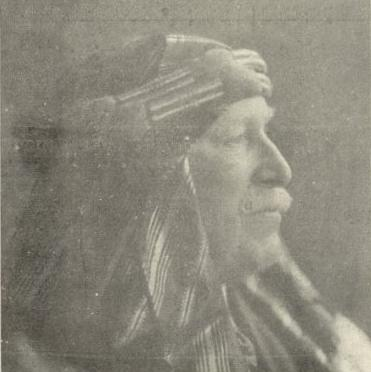
Rowland Allanson-Winn, 5th Baron Headley.

Lord Headley, Baron Allanson and Winn, of Aghadoe in the County of Kerry, was a title in the Peerage of Ireland. It was created in 1797 for Sir George Allanson-Winn, 1st Baronet, a former Baron of the Court of the Exchequer and Member of Parliament for Ripon. He had already been created a Baronet, of Little Warley in the County of Essex, in the Baronetage of Great Britain on 14 September 1776. His son, Charles Winn-Allanson, 2nd Baron Headley, represented Ripon, Malton and Ludgershall in Parliament. In 1833 he succeeded a distant relative as 8th Baronet, of Nostel (see below). His nephew, the third Baron (the son of the Honourable George Allanson-Winn, MP for Malton), sat in the House of Lords as an Irish representative peer from 1868 to 1877. His son, the fourth Baron, was an Irish Representative Peer from 1883 to 1913. His cousin, Rowland Allanson-Winn, 5th Baron Headley, was a prominent convert to Islam. On the death in 1994 of the latter's younger son, Charles Allanson-Winn, 7th Baron Headley, the titles became extinct.

The Baronetcy, of Nostel in the County of York, was created in the Baronetage of England on 3 December 1660 for George Winn. His great-grandson, the fourth Baronet, began the construction of the mansion of Nostell Priory in Yorkshire, which became the seat of the Winn family. The house later came into another branch of the family, the Barons St Oswald. The fourth Baronet’s son, the fifth Baronet, represented Pontefract in the House of Commons. On the death of the seventh Baronet, the title was inherited by his distant relative the second Baron Headley. The Baronetcy remained united with the Barony until their extinction in 1994.

== Barons Headley (1797) ==
Escutcheon of the Barons Headley

- George Allanson-Winn, 1st Baron Headley (1725–1798)
- Charles Winn-Allanson, 2nd Baron Headley (1784–1840)
- Charles Allanson-Winn, 3rd Baron Headley (1810–1877)
- Charles Allanson-Winn, 4th Baron Headley (1845–1913)
- Rowland Allanson-Winn, 5th Baron Headley (1855–1935)
- Rowland Allanson-Winn, 6th Baron Headley (1901–1969)
- Charles Allanson-Winn, 7th Baron Headley (1902–1994)

== Winn Baronets, of Nostel (1660) ==
Escutcheon of the Winn Baronets of Nostel

- Sir George Winn, 1st Baronet (c. 1607–1667)
- Sir Edmund Winn, 2nd Baronet (c. 1644–1694)
- Sir Rowland Winn, 3rd Baronet (1675–1722)
- Sir Rowland Winn, 4th Baronet (c. 1706–1765)
- Sir Rowland Winn, 5th Baronet (1739–1785)
- Sir Rowland Winn, 6th Baronet (1775–1805)
- Sir Edmund Mark Winn, 7th Baronet (1762–1833)
- Sir Charles Allanson-Winn, 8th Baronet (1784–1840) (had already succeeded as 2nd Baron Headley)

for further Baronets of Nostell, see the Barons Headley above

== See also ==
- Baron St Oswald
