= George Allanson-Winn, 1st Baron Headley =

George Allanson-Winn, 1st Baron Headley (1725 – 9 April 1798), known as Sir George Allanson-Winn, Bt, between 1776 and 1797, was a British barrister, judge and politician.

== Biography ==
Born George Winn, he was the only son of Pelham Winn, of South Ferriby, Lincolnshire, by Elizabeth Wighton, daughter of Reverend Gilbert Wighton by Elizabeth Allanson, sister of William Allanson, of Bramham Biggin, Bramham, Yorkshire. He entered Lincoln's Inn in 1744 and was called to the Bar in 1755. In 1761 he was appointed a Baron of the Exchequer, a post he held until 1776. He had succeeded to the estates of his cousin Mark Winn, of Little Warley, Essex, in 1763. In 1776 he was created a Baronet, of Little Warley in the County of Essex. In 1777 he also succeeded to the estates of his cousin Charles Allanson of Bramham Biggin and took the additional surname of Allanson.

In 1789 Allanson-Winn was returned to Parliament for Ripon. He was elected through his connection with William Lawrence, who managed the elections in Ripon, brother-in-law of the widow of Allanson-Winn's cousin Charles Allanson (who had previously represented Ripon in Parliament). He continued to represent Ripon until 1798, during which time he was a silent supporter of William Pitt the Younger's administration. Having earlier petitioned Pitt for an Irish peerage, he made a renewed petition in 1793. He was rewarded four years later when he was made an Irish peer as Lord Headley, Baron Allanson and Winn, of Aghadoe in the County of Kerry.

Lord Headley married firstly his kinswoman Anne Winn, daughter of Sir Rowland Winn, 4th Baronet, of Nostell Priory, in 1765. They had one daughter. After her death in October 1774 he married secondly Jane Blennerhassett, daughter and co-heiress of Arthur Blennerhassett, of Ballyseedy, County Kerry, in 1783. They had two sons and two daughters. He died in April 1798 and was succeeded in his titles by his eldest son, Charles.

Parliament of Great Britain
Preceded by William Lawrence; Sir John Goodricke, Bt	Member of Parliament for Ripon; 1789–1797; With: William Lawrence	Succeeded by William Lawrence; John Heathcote
Baronetage of Great Britain
New creation	Baronet (of Little Warley); 1776–1798	Succeeded by Charles Winn-Allanson
Preceded by Hamilton baronets	Winn baronets of Little Warley; 14 September 1776	Succeeded by Mackworth baronets
Peerage of Ireland
New creation	Baron Headley; 1797–1798	Succeeded by Charles Winn-Allanson
