= Aislabie =

Aislabie is a surname. Notable people with the surname include:

- Benjamin Aislabie (1774–1842), English cricket administrator and cricketer
- Francis Aislabie (by 1515–1557), English politician.
- John Aislabie (1670–1742), British politician
- Several 18th-century public servants called William Aislabie
