= Thomas Duncombe =

Thomas Duncombe may refer to:

- Thomas Slingsby Duncombe (1796–1861), British Radical politician; Member of Parliament for Hertford, 1826–1832, and Finsbury, 1834–1861
- Thomas Duncombe (died 1746) (c. 1683–1746), British Member of Parliament for Downton, 1711–1713, and Ripon, 1734–1741
- Thomas Duncombe (died 1779) (1724–1779), British Member of Parliament for Downton, 1751–1754 and 1768–1775, and Morpeth, 1754–1768
