= Spring Hall Farm =

Farm in Grewelthorpe, North Yorkshire, England

Coordinates: 54°10′21″N 1°37′23″W

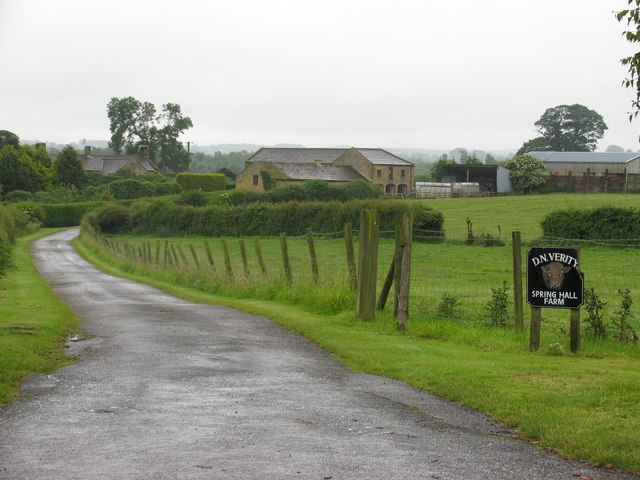
The farm, with the roof of Spring Hall visible to the left

Spring Hall Farm is a farm in Grewelthorpe, a village in North Yorkshire, in England.

The farm is centred on Spring Hall, built in 1708 as a yeoman's house; a stone at the rear is inscribed "LJB 1708". The hall was grade II* listed in 1967. When put up for sale in 2015, it was advertised as containing an entrance hall, living room, dining room, breakfast room, five bedrooms and two bathrooms.

The house is built of stone, with quoins, and a stone slate roof with shaped kneelers and stone coping. It has two storeys and eight bays. On the front is a full-height porch containing a doorway with a chamfered surround and a hood mould, above which is a rectangular window with a moulded surround, and a coped gable with shaped kneelers. The other windows are mullioned with two lights. At the rear is a lozenge-shaped initialled and dated stone, and inside there is a large inglenook fireplace.

The farm buildings to the northwest are separately listed at grade II. They are built of stone with a stone slate roof. The western range contains a large threshing barn incorporating a pigeoncote. At the northwest corner is a two-storey cart shed range with a granary above, and to the left is a stable range with five doorways. To the southeast of the barn is a wall linking with an outbuilding.

== See also ==
- Grade II* listed buildings in North Yorkshire (district)
- Listed buildings in Grewelthorpe
