= Edwin Lascelles =

Edwin Lascelles may refer to:

- Edwin Lascelles, 1st Baron Harewood (1713–1795), 18th century nobleman and MP
- Edwin Lascelles (MP for Ripon) (1799–1865), 19th century MP
