= John York (disambiguation) =

John York is an American pathologist who is the co-owner and co-chairman of the San Francisco 49ers.

John York may also refer to:

- John York (Master of the Mint) (died 1569), Master of the Mint
- John J. York, American actor
- John York (musician), American musician

== See also ==
- John Yorke (disambiguation)
- Jack York, Canadian slave
