= William Lawrence (Ripon MP) =

British politician

William Lawrence or Laurence (c. 1723–1798) was a British politician who sat in the House of Commons on three occasions between 1761 and 1798.

Lawrence was the second son of Captain Thomas Laurence RN and his wife Elizabeth Soulden, daughter of Gabriel Soulden, merchant, of Kinsale, county Cork. He married Anna Sophia Aislabie, daughter of William Aislabie of Studley Royal, near Ripon, Yorkshire, on 21 November 1759.

Lawrence was returned as Member of Parliament for Ripon in the 1761 general election on his father-in-law's interest. In 1768, Charles Allanson (Aislabie's other son-in law) was returned at Ripon instead and Lawrence did not stand for Parliament again until he was returned at a by-election 30 October 1775 after Allanson died.

In 1780 Lawrence was not put up for election again by his father-in-law for unknown reasons. However Aislabie died in the following year and Lawrence, having gained control of the borough, took his empty seat at Ripon in a by-election on 5 June 1781. He was returned for Ripon unopposed in 1784, 1790 and 1796. There is no record of his having spoken in the House.

Lawrence died on 2 September 1798 aged 75. His daughter subsequently upheld the family interest in Ripon.

Parliament of Great Britain
Preceded by William Aislabie; Sir Charles Vernon	Member of Parliament for Ripon; 1761–1768; With: William Aislabie	Succeeded by William Aislabie; Charles Allanson
Preceded by William Aislabie; Charles Allanson	Member of Parliament for Ripon; 1775–1780; With: William Aislabie	Succeeded by William Aislabie; Frederick Robinson
Preceded by William Aislabie; Frederick Robinson	Member of Parliament for Ripon; 1781–1796; With: Frederick Robinson 1781–1787; Sir John Goodricke, Bt 1787–1789; Sir George Allanson-Winn, Bt 1789–1798; John Heathcote 1798	Succeeded by Sir James Graham, Bt; John Heathcote
