= Gervase Lee =

16th-century English politician

Gervase Lee (died after 1623), of Southwell, Nottinghamshire, was an English politician.

He was a member (MP) of the parliament of England for Ripon in 1584.
