= Mathew Flathers =

English Roman Catholic priest and martyr

Blessed Matthew Flathers

Martyr
- Born: c. 1580; Weston, West Riding of Yorkshire, England
- Died: 21 March 1607; Micklegate Bar, York
- Beatified: 22 November 1987 by Pope John Paul II
- Feast: 21 March, 22 November (with the Douai Martyrs)

Mathew Flathers (Matthew; alias Major) (c. 1580 – 21 March c. 1607) was an English Roman Catholic priest. He is a Catholic martyr, beatified in 1987.

== Life ==
Born at Weston, West Riding of Yorkshire, Flathers was educated at Douai, graduating on 5 June 1605. He was ordained at Arras on 25 March 1606. and became an oblate of the Benedictine order. Three months later he was sent to the English mission, arriving on 30 June alongside Thomas Somers.

Flathers was discovered almost immediately by the agents of the Government; after the Gunpowder Plot, the English state was particularly active in hunting down Catholic priests. He was brought to trial, under the statute of 27 Elizabeth, on the charge of receiving orders abroad, and condemned to death. By an act of clemency, this sentence was commuted to banishment for life; but after a brief exile, Flathers returned to England and his mission. After ministering for a short time to Catholics in Yorkshire, he was apprehended again at Upsall Castle through the efforts of Stephen Proctor, Timothy Whittingham, and Thomas Posthumous Hoby.

Brought to trial at York on the charge of being ordained abroad and exercising priestly functions in England, Flathers was offered his life on condition that he take the recently enacted Oath of Allegiance. On his refusal, he was condemned to death and taken to the common place of execution outside Micklegate Bar, York.

There Flathers was hanged, drawn, and quartered; biographers recorded that after he was cut down alive, a man "with a halberd stroke him upon the head and cutt off a peece, another with a sword cutt him overthwart the face", and a third "with a hatchet cutt off his head". Various sources give the year of his death as 1606, 1607, or 1608, but agree on a date of 21 March.
