= Charles Allanson-Winn, 7th Baron Headley =

The Lord Headley
- Born: Charles Rowland Allanson-Winn; 19 May 1902
- Died: 23 February 1994 (aged 91)

Charles Rowland Allanson-Winn, 7th Baron Headley (May 19, 1902 – February 23, 1994), was an Irish Peer. He was the last of the Headley Barony.

== Biography ==
The son of Rowland Allanson-Winn, 5th Baron Headley, Charles Allanson-Winn was born on 19 May 1902 and educated at Bedford School. He succeeded to the title of Baron Headley upon the death of his elder brother, Rowland Allanson-Winn, 6th Baron Headley (1901–1969).

Upon the death of Charles Allanson-Winn, 7th Baron Headley, on 23 February 1994, the Headley Barony became extinct.

Peerage of Ireland
Preceded by Rowland Allanson-Winn	Baron Headley; 1969–1994	Extinct
