= Frederick Robinson (1746–1792) =

British politician (1746–1792)

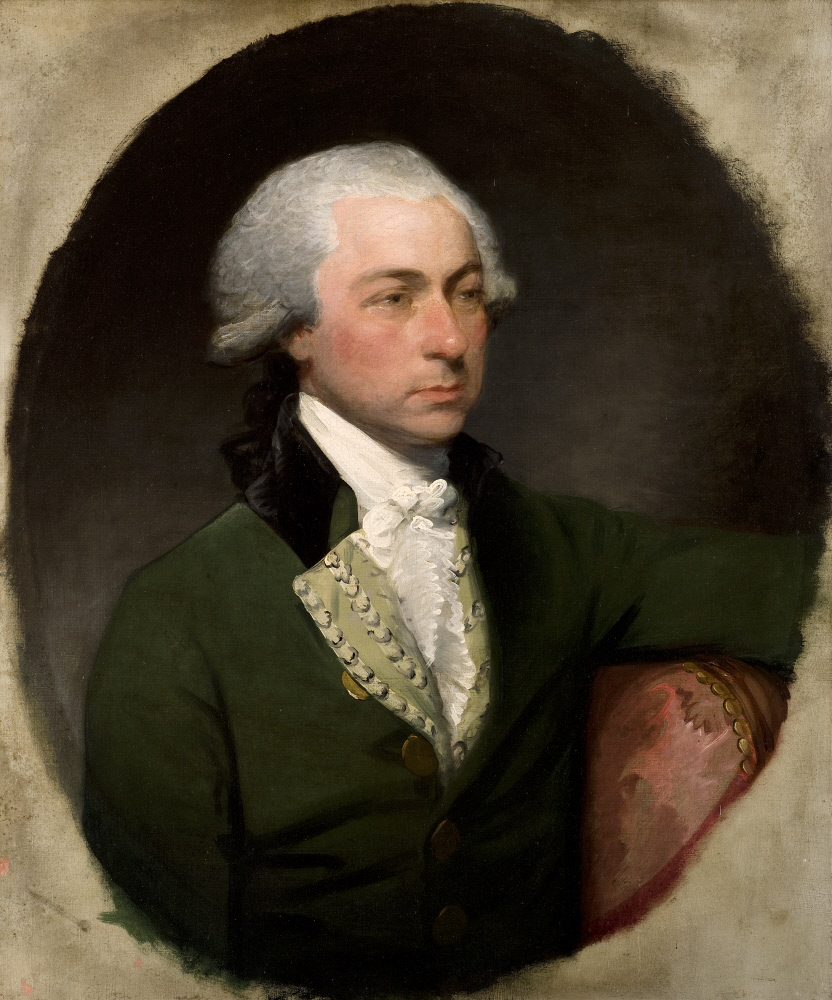

Member of the British Parliament for Ripon
- In office 1781–1787

Personal details
- Born: 11 October 1746
- Died: 28 December 1792 (aged 46)
- Spouse: Katherine Gertrude Harris
- Parent: Thomas Robinson, 1st Baron Grantham (father)

The Hon. Frederic ("Fritz") Robinson (11 October 1746 – 28 December 1792) was an English MP.

Robinson was the second son of Thomas Robinson, 1st Baron Grantham. His older brother Thomas Robinson, 2nd Baron Grantham was Ambassador at Madrid 1771–8; Fritz accompanied him to Spain as his Secretary, though ill-health forced him to return to England in 1777.

He became Tory MP for Ripon in 1781. In 1785, he married Katherine Gertrude Harris, the eldest surviving daughter of the musician and philosopher James Harris. He resigned his seat and accepted a pension in December 1787, and purchased 8 Whitehall Gardens, today Malmesbury House, in 1788; after his death his widow continued to live there until her own death in 1834.

Parliament of Great Britain
Preceded by William Lawrence; William Aislabie	Member of Parliament for Ripon; 1780–1787; With: William Aislabie to 1781; William Lawrence from 1781	Succeeded by William Lawrence; Sir John Goodricke, Bt
