= John Scott (MP for Ripon) =

16th-century English politician

John Scott (fl. 1572), was an English politician.

He was a member (MP) of the parliament of England for Ripon in 1572.
