= St James' Church, Grewelthorpe =

Church in North Yorkshire, England

Coordinates: 54°10′56″N 1°38′55″W

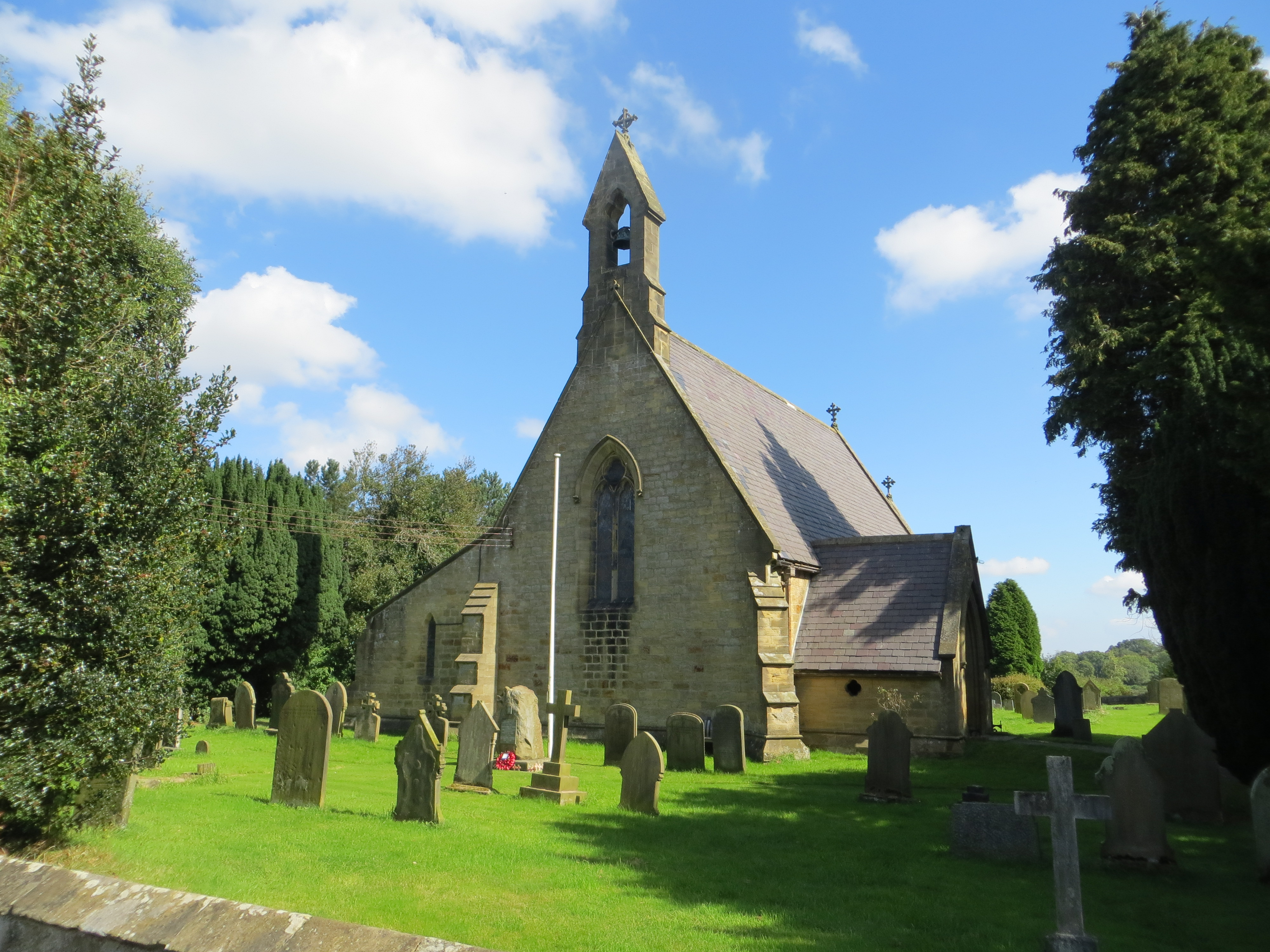
The church in 2014

St James' Church is the parish church of Grewelthorpe, a village in North Yorkshire, in England.

The church was built between 1846 and 1848, to a simple decorated gothic design by Adolphus Henry Cates. In 1851, it was recorded as having space for 250 worshippers, with 80 regularly attending on Sundays. The church was grade II listed in 1987.

The church is built of stone with a Welsh slate roof. It consists of a nave, a north aisle, a south porch, and a chancel with a vestry. On the west gable is a gabled bellcote, containing a bell in a chamfered pointed arched opening. Several of the windows have stained glass, designed by Forrest and Son.

== See also ==
- Listed buildings in Grewelthorpe
