= 1871 Ripon by-election =

UK Parliamentary by-election

The 1871 Ripon by-election was held on 15 February 1871. The by-election was held due to the resignation of the incumbent MP of the Liberal Party, Lord John Hay. It was won by the Liberal candidate Sir Henry Knight Storks.
