= William Heath (died 1570) =

English politician

William Heath (by 1533 – 1568/70), of Alvechurch, Worcestershire, was an English politician. He was a member of the parliament of England for Ludlow in 1555, and for Ripon in 1558. He had two legitimate sons, two legitimate daughters and one illegitimate son.
