= Henry Storks =

British Army general

Lieutenant-General The Right Honourable Sir Henry Storks GCB GCMG
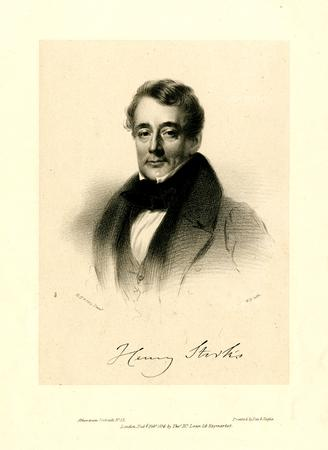
- Storks in 1836
- Born: 5 April 1811
- Died: 6 September 1874 (aged 63)
- Military career
- Allegiance: United Kingdom
- Branch: British Army
- Service years: 1828 – 1874
- Rank: Lieutenant-General
- Awards: Knight Grand Cross of the Order of the Bath; Knight Grand Cross of the Order of St Michael and St George

Lieutenant-General Sir Henry Knight Storks, GCB, GCMG, PC (5 April 1811 – 6 September 1874) was a British soldier and colonial governor.

== Military career ==
Educated at Charterhouse School, he entered the Army on 10 January 1828 as an ensign of the 61st Regiment of Foot. He was promoted lieutenant on 2 March 1832, exchanged to the 14th Regiment of Foot on 23 March 1832 and was promoted captain on 30 October 1835. Exchanging to the 38th Regiment of Foot on 30 May 1836, he served with them in the Ionian Islands in 1840 and was promoted major on 7 August 1840.

He went on half pay from the regiment on 23 May 1845 and served in a variety of staff posts. He served as an Assistant Adjutant General during the seventh of the Cape Frontier Wars from 1846 to 1847, and was subsequently promoted to an unattached lieutenant colonelcy on 15 September 1848. From 1849 to 1854, he was Assistant Military Secretary at Mauritius, and was promoted colonel on 28 November 1854.

Promoted major-general, Storks superintended the British bases set up in Ottoman territory during the Crimean War, where he supported the nursing efforts of Florence Nightingale. After the war, he was awarded the KCB (2 January 1857) and employed from 1857 to 1859 by the War Office as Secretary for Military Correspondence.

He now began his career in colonial government, appointed Lord High Commissioner of the Ionian Islands on 2 February 1859. While serving there, he was created GCMG in 1860, and reorganized the judiciary of the islands before the end of the commissionership (by treaty) on 14 November 1863. He was made a GCB on 1 July 1864. Sent next to Malta, he was appointed Governor on 15 November 1864. However, he was called the next year to Jamaica to investigate the disturbances there, including the Morant Bay rebellion, and was appointed Governor of Jamaica on 12 December 1865. He held that post until 16 July 1866. Upon his return, he was created a Privy Councillor (10 November 1866). He resigned the Governorship of Malta on 15 May 1867.

Now back at the War Office, he was appointed Controller-in-Chief and Under-Secretary at the War Office on 19 December 1867. There, he was involved in the re-organization of Army logistics that took place after the Crimean War. He was appointed Surveyor-General of the Ordnance on 5 August 1870, the first to hold that post since the Crimean War. On 10 October 1870 he was appointed colonel of the 70th Regiment of Foot, an office he held for the remainder of his life.

== Last years in politics ==
Entering politics in 1870, Storks was endorsed as the Liberal candidate at a parliamentary by-election for the Borough of Newark that followed the death of the sitting Liberal MP. He was opposed by Sir George Grey, standing as an independent liberal. Grey's views the Colonial Empire, of emigration, of Home Rule for Ireland and poverty were contrary to those of Gladstone's Liberal government. The administration arranged that both withdrew, allowing the Liberal Samuel Boteler Bristowe to take the seat. Storks was rewarded with the newly revived post of Surveyor-General of the Ordnance, and Grey returned to New Zealand later that year.

The following year Storks was elected to parliament at the Ripon by-election. He was promoted lieutenant general on 25 October 1871. While in Parliament, he spoke in favor of the abolition of the purchase system for Army commissions. His stance on the Contagious Diseases Acts contributed to his defeat by the Earl de Grey in the 1874 general election. He died shortly after losing the election, on 6 September 1874. He was buried in the Western part of Highgate Cemetery.

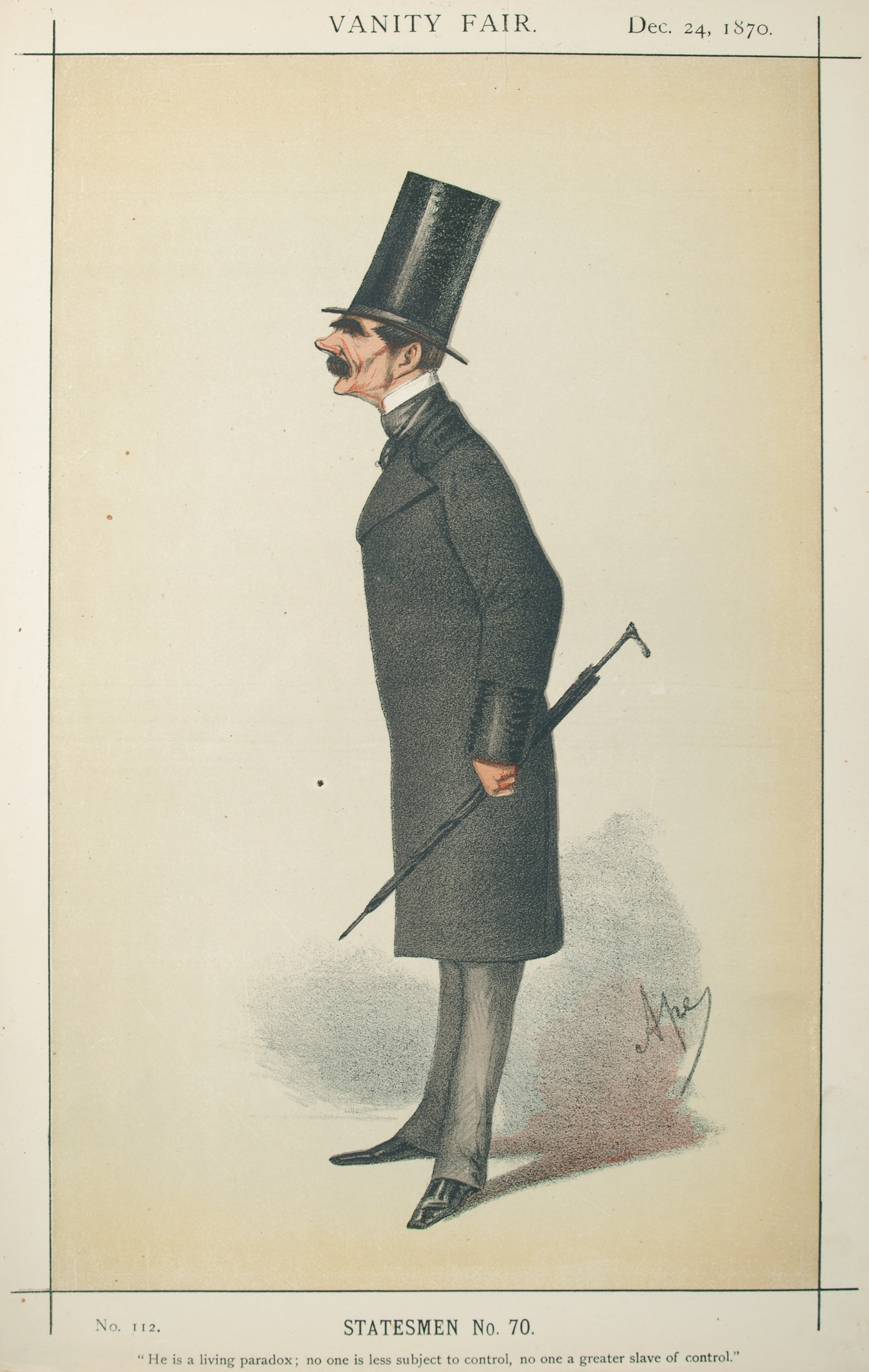
Caricature by Ape published in Vanity Fair in 1870

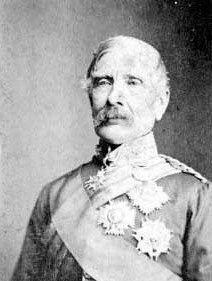
Knight Storks around 1870

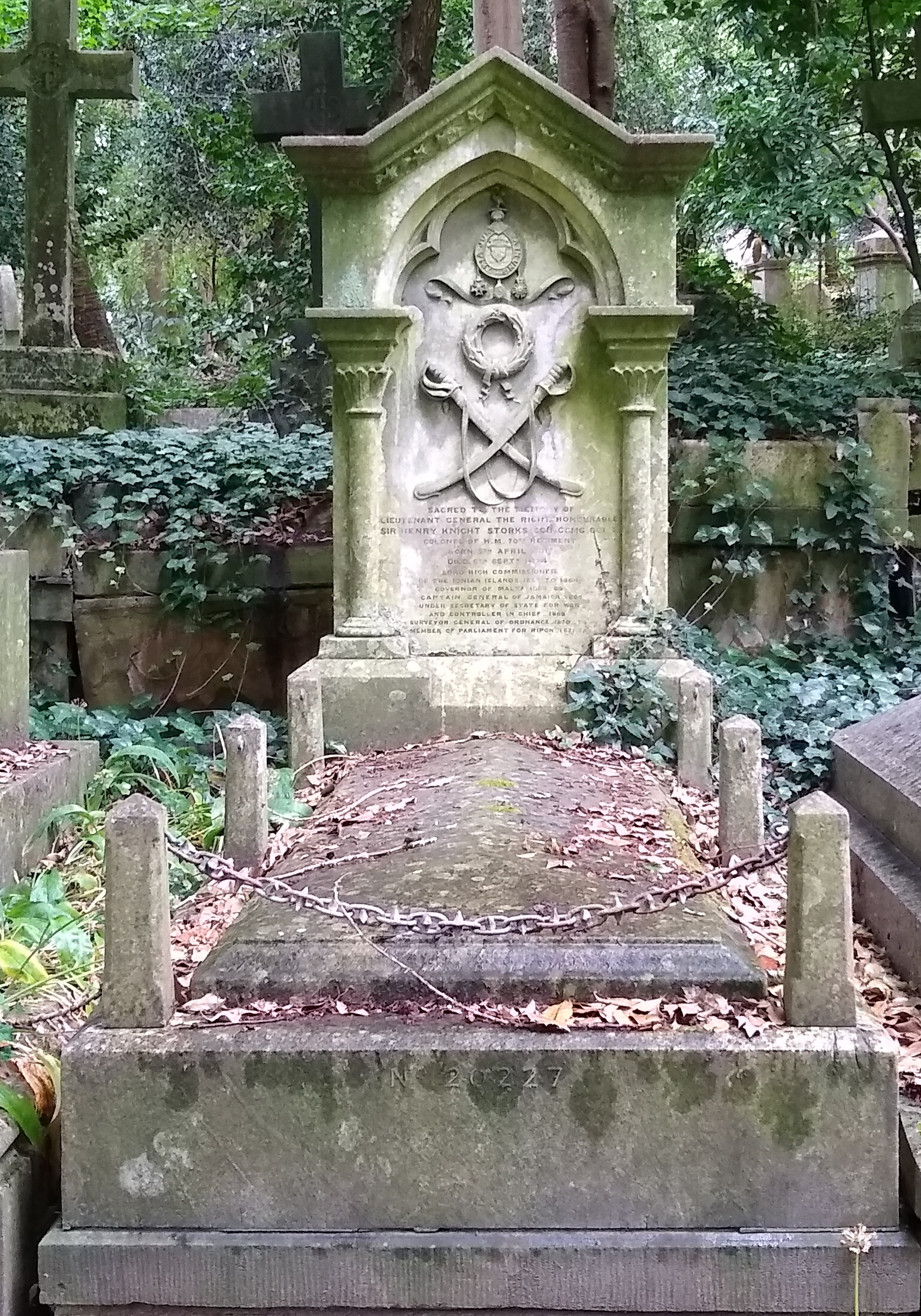
Grave of Sir Henry Knight Storks in Highgate Cemetery (West)

Political offices
Preceded by William Ewart Gladstone	Lord High Commissioner of the Ionian Islands; 1859–1863	Succeeded by end of British protectorate
Preceded by Sir John Le Marchant	Governor of Malta; 1864–1867	Succeeded by Sir Patrick Grant
Preceded by Edward John Eyre	Governor of Jamaica; 1865–1866	Succeeded by Sir John Peter Grant
Parliament of the United Kingdom
Preceded by Lord John Hay	Member of Parliament for Ripon; 1871–1874	Succeeded by Earl de Grey
Military offices
Vacant Title last held by Lauderdale Maule	Surveyor-General of the Ordnance; 1870–1874	Succeeded by Lord Eustace Cecil
Preceded by Charles Hastings Doyle	Colonel of the 70th (Surrey) Regiment of Foot; 1870–1874	Succeeded by Thomas James Galloway
