= Sir John Goodricke, 5th Baronet =

British diplomat and politician

Sir John Goodricke, 5th Baronet (1708–1789), was a British diplomat and politician who sat in the House of Commons between 1774 and 1789.

== Early life ==
Goodricke was the son of Sir Henry Goodricke, 4th Baronet of Ribston Hall and his wife Mary Jenkyns daughter of Tobias Jenkyns of Grimston and was born on 20 May 1708. In 1725, he entered Trinity College, Cambridge. He married Mary Benson, illegitimate daughter of Robert Benson, 1st Baron Bingley on 28 September 1731. He succeeded his father in the baronetcy on 21 July 1738.

== Diplomatic career ==
Goodricke became a diplomat. He was resident at the court of Brussels in 1750 although he did not go there. In 1758 he was appointed minister to Sweden, but remained at Copenhagen until he was admitted to Sweden in April 1764, and was there as envoy from 1764 to 1773. He relinquished his Stockholm appointment in 1773 when he inherited a life interest in the Bramham Park estate from his wife's brother in law George Fox Lane.

== Political career ==
In the 1774 general election Goodricke was returned as Member of Parliament for Pontefract but did not stand again in 1780. In a by-election in 1787 he was elected MP for Ripon which he held until his death in 1789.

== Fraud victim ==
Shortly before his death, Goodricke was the victim of a fraudulent transaction at his bank Hoare's Bank. A young man tendered a Bill of Exchange signed “J Goodricke”. The clerk was suspicious, but the drawer was familiar and it was thought possible that Goodricke's signature may have been affected by gout. The bill was subsequently proved to be a forgery and in the meantime a couple had opened an account using the money at another bank. When a woman arrived at that bank with a draft on the new account she was detained and her partner was discovered by the Bow Street Runners in a waiting carriage. The young man was quickly brought before the Bow Street magistrate, but Goodricke was surprised to discover he was the son of one of his gardeners in Yorkshire for whom he had procured a post at India House and given a sum of money. The felon became insane and died in Newgate Prison while awaiting trial on 2 August 1789.

== Later life and legacy ==
Goodricke died on 3 August 1789 the day after the felon who tried to cheat him. He had one son and two daughters. His son Henry was MP for Lymington, but predeceased him. He was succeeded in the baronetcy by his grandson Henry.

== See also ==
- List of Ambassadors of Great Britain to Sweden

Parliament of Great Britain
Preceded by Robert Monckton; Henry Strachey	Member of Parliament for Pontefract; 1774–1780; With: Charles Mellish	Succeeded by William Nedham; 4th Viscount Galway
Preceded by William Lawrence; Frederick Robinson	Member of Parliament for Ripon; 1787–1789; With: William Lawrence	Succeeded by William Lawrence; Sir George Allanson-Winn, Bt
Baronetage of England
Preceded by Henry Goodricke	Baronet (of Ribston); 1738–1789	Succeeded by Henry Goodricke
