= Listed buildings in Grewelthorpe =

Grewelthorpe is a civil parish in the county of North Yorkshire, England. It contains 17 listed buildings that are recorded in the National Heritage List for England. Of these, two are listed at Grade II*, the middle of the three grades, and the others are at Grade II, the lowest grade. The parish contains the village of Grewelthorpe and the surrounding area. In the parish is Hack Fall Wood, which contains four listed follies. The other listed buildings include houses, cottages and associated structures, farmhouses, a public house and a church.

== Key ==
Grade	Criteria
II*	Particularly important buildings of more than special interest
II	Buildings of national importance and special interest

== Buildings ==
Name and location	Photograph	Date	Notes	Grade
Goundry Farmhouse; 54.17960°N 1.64521°W		17th century	The farmhouse was extended to the left in the 19th century. It is in rendered stone and has stone slate roofs with stone copings. The original part has two storeys and one bay, and a single-storey single-bay wing to the right. It contains a doorway, a horizontally-sliding sash window to the right, and a casement window above. The later part has two storeys and three bays, and a central doorway with a fanlight. The doorway and the windows, which are sashes, have flat stone arches with voussoirs.	II
Raby Cottages; 54.18350°N 1.64990°W		17th century	A pair of stone cottages with a Welsh slate roof, stone copings and returned kneelers. There are two storeys and four bays. On the front are two doorways, the left with a slightly pointed head. The ground floor windows are double-chamfered, mullioned and transomed, and above them is a continuous hood mould. In the upper floor is a small casement window, and the other windows are mullioned with three lights. Inside the right cottage is an inglenook fireplace.	II
Spring Hall; 54.17252°N 1.62297°W	—	1708	The house is in stone, with quoins, and a stone slate roof with shaped kneelers and stone coping. There are two storeys and eight bays. On the front is a full-height porch containing a doorway with a chamfered surround and a hood mould, above which is a rectangular window with a moulded surround, and a coped gable with shaped kneelers. The other windows are mullioned with two lights. At the rear is a lozenge-shaped initialled and dated stone, and inside there is a large inglenook fireplace.	II*
Foulgate Nook Farmhouse; 54.17816°N 1.67411°W	—	Early 18th century	The farmhouse is in stone on a plinth, with quoins, and a stone slate roof with shaped kneelers and stone copings. There are two storeys and two bays. The doorway has a moulded architrave, a fanlight, a segmental head and a cornice. The windows are casements in moulded architraves with sills, friezes and cornices.	II
Gateposts south of Foulgate Nook Farmhouse; 54.17786°N 1.67394°W		Early 18th century	The gateposts are square and in stone. Each post is panelled, on a plinth, and has pilasters topped with carved scrolls, above which is a cornice surmounted by a gadrooned finial.	II
Fisher's Hall; 54.19023°N 1.64084°W		1750	A folly in Hack Fall Wood, it is in tufa, and has an octagonal plan and a single storey. It is without a roof, it has a plain eaves band, and is in Gothick style. The building contains a doorway with a pointed moulded arch and pilasters, above which is a dated and initialled tablet. On the other sides are window openings with pointed arches.	II
Mowbray Castle; 54.18831°N 1.64083°W		c. 1750	A folly in Hack Fall Wood in the form of a ruined stone Gothick tower. There are two storeys, an oval plan, and a front of three bays. In the centre is a large opening with a pointed arch, and the flanking wings contain smaller pointed arches with imposts. Above is a floor band, a cross-shaped opening in the middle bay and pointed arches in the outer bays. At the top are the remains of an eaves band and a parapet.	II
Rustic Temple; 54.19117°N 1.64347°W		c. 1750	A folly in Hack Fall Wood, it is a ruin in stone. There is a single storey and an octagonal plan. On the front is an opening, flanked by square openings, all under large lintels. Inside, in the middle of the back wall, is a round-headed niche.	II
The Ruin, Mowbray Point; 54.19038°N 1.64553°W		c. 1750	A folly or former banqueting hall in Hack Fall Wood, partly a ruin, in stone and tufa. The front range has one storey and five bays, the middle three bays projecting under a pediment with a moulded cornice. In the centre is a doorway flanked by windows, all with pointed arches and voussoirs. The outer bays contain rectangular windows. At the rear are three round arches, the middle one tallest, and a domed roof pierced by roundels. Outside these are tunnel vaults with niches.	II*
Hackfall Farmhouse; 54.18619°N 1.64731°W		Late 18th century	The farmhouse is in stone, with quoins, a moulded cornice, and a hipped pantile roof. In the centre is a doorway with a bracketed hood, and the windows are horizontally-sliding sashes. At the rear is a semicircular bow window.	II
Hillside; 54.18113°N 1.64908°W	—	Late 18th century	Two houses combined into one, it is in stone, with quoins, a moulded stone cornice, and a pantile roof with shaped kneelers and stone coping. There are two storeys and three bays. On the front are two doorways, each with a quoined surround and a stone hood on consoles. The windows are casements with plain surrounds.	II
Hilltop Farmhouse; 54.18144°N 1.65017°W	—	Late 18th century	The farmhouse is in stone, with quoins, a moulded stone cornice, and a stone slate roof with shaped kneelers and stone coping. The central doorway has a plain surround, to its left is a casement window, and the other windows are horizontally-sliding sashes with plain surrounds.	II
Westfield House; 54.18132°N 1.64828°W		Late 18th century	A house in stone with a Welsh slate roof, shaped kneelers and stone coping. There are three storeys and two bays. In the centre is a doorway with a stone hood on shaped consoles. The windows in the lower two floors are sashes, and in the top floor they are casements.	II
Farm buildings northwest of Spring Hall; 54.17284°N 1.62315°W		c. 1820	The farm buildings are in stone with a stone slate roof. The western range contains a large threshing barn incorporating a pigeoncote. At the northwest corner is a two-storey cart shed range with a granary above, and to the left is a stable range with five doorways. To the southeast of the barn is a wall linking with an outbuilding.	II
Hazel House; 54.18123°N 1.64819°W		Early 19th century	The house is in stone, with quoins, a floor band, and a slate roof with stone coping and kneelers. There are two storeys and two bays. The central doorway has a fanlight, and the windows are sashes with keystones.	II
The Crown Inn; 54.18174°N 1.64864°W		Early 19th century	The public house is in stone, and consists of a main block with three storeys and three bays, and a two-storey two-bay wing on the left. The main block has chamfered quoins, and a stone slate roof with shaped kneelers and stone copings. In the centre is a projecting gabled porch, the windows in the lower two floors are casements, and in the top floor are square four-paned windows. The wing has a Welsh slate roof with stone coping on the left. It contains a segmental carriage arch and sash windows.	II
St James' Church; 54.18224°N 1.64869°W		1845–47	The church is in stone with a Welsh slate roof. It consists of a nave, a north aisle, a south porch, and a chancel with a vestry. On the west gable is a gabled bellcote, containing a bell in a chamfered pointed arched opening.	II
