= 1868 Ripon by-election =

UK parliamentary by-election

The 1868 Ripon by-election was held on 21 December 1868. The by-election was held due to the incumbent Liberal MP, John Hay, becoming Junior Naval Lord. It was retained by Hay who was unopposed.
