= Charles Winn-Allanson, 2nd Baron Headley =

British politician

Charles Winn-Allanson, 2nd Baron Headley (25 June 1784 – 9 April 1840), styled The Honourable Charles Winn-Allanson between 1797 and 1798, was a British politician.

== Background and education ==
Winn-Allanson was the elder son of George Allanson-Winn, 1st Baron Headley, by his second wife Jane Blennerhassett, daughter and co-heiress of Arthur Blennerhassett, of Ballyseedy, County Kerry. George Allanson-Winn was his younger brother. He was educated at Eton and Trinity College, Cambridge.

== Political career ==
Lord Headley succeeded his father in the barony in 1798, aged 13. This was an Irish peerage and was not to entitle him to an automatic seat in the House of Lords on his 21st birthday in 1805. In 1806 he was one of the contenders for William Pitt the Younger's parliamentary seat at Cambridge University but made way for Lord Palmerston. At the general election of that year he was instead returned for Ripon, a seat controlled by the Allanson family. During this time he was listed as a supporter of the abolition of the slave trade. The following year he stood for Malton, against the interest of the Earl FitzWilliam. He was duly elected, mainly as a result of dissatisfaction with FitzWilliam and his agents. However, FitzWilliam and his supporters managed to obtain evidence of corruption and had Headley unseated on petition in 1808. He later represented Ludgershall between 1811 and 1812. He is not recorded as having ever spoken in the House of Commons.

== Family ==
Lord Headley married Anne Matthews in 1826. In 1833 he succeeded a distant cousin as 8th Baronet of Nostel. He died in April 1840, aged 55, and was succeeded in the titles by his nephew, Mark.

Parliament of the United Kingdom
| Preceded by John Heathcote; Sir James Graham, Bt | Member of Parliament for Ripon; 1806–1807; With: Sir James Graham, Bt | Succeeded by Hon. F. J. Robinson; George Gipps |
| Preceded by Bryan Cooke; Viscount Milton | Member of Parliament for Malton; 1807–1808; With: Robert Lawrence Dundas | Succeeded by Robert Lawrence Dundas; Bryan Cooke |
| Preceded by Magens Dorrien-Magens; Joseph Hague Everett | Member of Parliament for Ludgershall; 1811–1812; With: Magens Dorrien-Magens | Succeeded by Magens Dorrien-Magens; Joseph Hague Everett |
Peerage of Ireland
| Preceded by George Allanson-Winn | Baron Headley; 1798–1840 | Succeeded by Charles Allanson-Winn |
Baronetage of England
| Preceded by Edmund Mark Winn | Baronet (of Nostel); 1833–1840 | Succeeded by Charles Allanson-Winn |
