= William Aislabie (1700–1781) =

English politician (1700–1781)

William Aislabie (1700 – 17 May 1781) of Studley Royal, North Yorkshire was an English landowner and Tory politician who sat in the House of Commons for over 60 years from 1721 to 1781. His long unbroken service in the House of Commons was only surpassed, more than 100 years after his death, by the 63 years achieved by Charles Pelham Villiers at Wolverhampton.

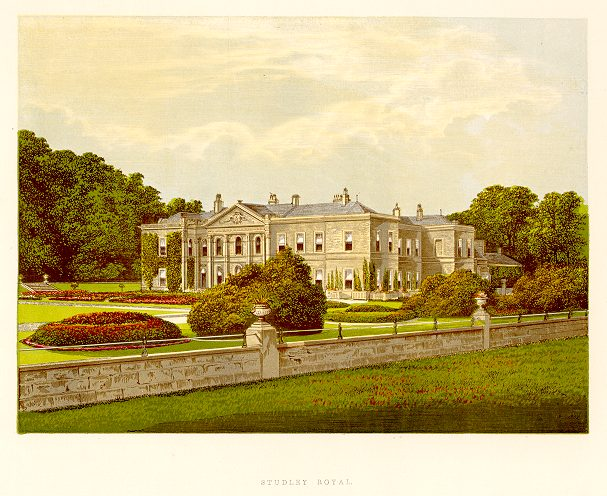
Studley Royal, 1880

== Background ==
Aislabie was the son of John Aislabie of Studley Royal, North Yorkshire and his first wife, Anne Rawlinson daughter of Sir William Rawlinson of Hendon. He inherited and landscaped Hack Fall Wood, near Grewelthorpe, North Yorkshire.

== Political career ==
Kirkby Fleetham Hall, North Yorkshire

Aislabie's father bought Kirkby Fleetham estate for him in North Yorkshire on reaching his age of majority, c. 1722 and he was first elected as Member of Parliament for Ripon on 17 May 1721 In the immediate aftermath of his father's disgrace for his connection with the South Sea Bubble, Aislabie's brother John Aislabie Jr. had previously held the seat. In 1721, Aislabie actually partnered (in the then two-member seat) his uncle of the same name and for a later part of the time his cousin, also named William Aislabie.

He served continuously as the MP for Ripon until his death in 1781, a period of 60 years 47 days, reaching the position of Father of the House of Commons in 1768. His last recorded speech in the House, on the Duke of Bridgewater's Canals Bill, was made in 1770, he last voted in 1773, and in 1779, The Public Ledger journal commented: "His age and infirmities do not allow him to attend."

In 1738, Aislabie was also appointed as an Auditor of the Imprests, and from 1749 until his death was registrar of the consistory court of the Diocese of York.

On his father's death in 1742 he inherited the Studley estate and in 1768 purchased the adjacent Fountains estate for £16,000. Aislabie then spent large amounts of time and energy developing one of England's finest water gardens on the estate.

In 1781, the year of his death, he undertook the restoration of the Ripon Obelisk which had been built by his father to a design by Nicholas Hawksmoor. William's renovation added a weathervane in the shape of the celebrated Ripon hornblower.

== Family ==
Aislabie married firstly, in about 1722, Lady Elizabeth Cecil (1706–1733), the daughter of the 6th Earl of Exeter, with whom he had two sons and two daughters, and secondly, on 6 September 1745, Elizabeth, daughter of Sir Charles Vernon of Farnham, Surrey, with whom he had one son and one daughter. None of his sons survived him. Studley Royal was left to his daughter Elizabeth, who had married Charles Allanson, his fellow MP. He built the present Kirkby Fleetham Hall on the Kirkby Fleetham estate in the mid-1700s for another daughter, Ann Sophie, who had married William Lawrence.

Parliament of the United Kingdom
Preceded by John Aislabie; William Aislabie (elder)	Member of Parliament for Ripon; 1721–1781; With: William Aislabie (elder) to 1722; John Scrope 1722–27; William Aislabie (3) 1727–34; Thomas Duncombe 1734–41; Hon. Henry Vane 1741–47; Sir Charles Vernon 1747–61; William Lawrence 1761–68; Charles Allanson 1768–75; William Lawrence 1775–80; Frederick Robinson from 1780	Succeeded by Frederick Robinson; William Lawrence
Preceded by Sir John Rushout, 4th Baronet	Father of the House; 1768–1781	Succeeded by Charles FitzRoy-Scudamore
