= Charles Allanson =

British politician (1720–1775)

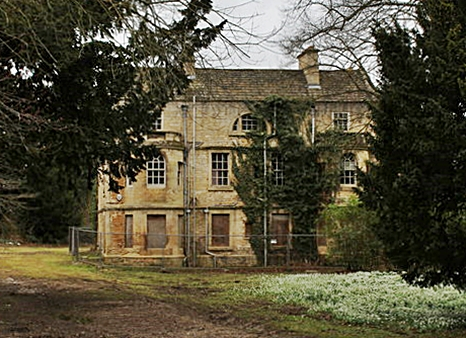
Bramham Biggin

Charles Allanson (c. 1720–1775) was a British politician who sat in the House of Commons from 1768 to 1775. Allanson was the eldest son of William Allanson of Little Sion, Middlesex. He entered Inner Temple in 1738 and matriculated at Queen’s College, Oxford on 2 May 1739, aged 18.

Allanson was returned as Member of Parliament for Ripon in the 1768 general election on the interest of his father-in-law and like him followed an independent line in the House. He was re-elected unopposed as MP for Ripon in 1774. There is no record of his having spoken in the House. He lived at Bramham Biggin on the Bramham Park near Wetherby, West Yorkshire. Allanson died on 17 September 1775. He had married firstly Mary Peters widow of Colonel Peters and daughter of Daniel Turner, MD on 30 April 1757. She died on 14 October 1762 and he had married secondly Elizabeth Aislabie, daughter of William Aislabie of Studley Royal, near Ripon, Yorkshire on 14 February 1765. After his death his widow inherited Studley Royal Park in North Yorkshire from her father.

Parliament of Great Britain
Preceded by William Aislabie; William Lawrence	Member of Parliament for Ripon; 1768– 1775; With: William Aislabie	Succeeded by William Aislabie; William Lawrence
