= Edward Beseley =

16th-century English politician

Edward Beseley (by 1532 – 1613 or later), of York and Skelton in Overton, Yorkshire, was an English politician.

He was a member (MP) of the parliament of England for Ripon in October 1553, for Thirsk in November 1554 and for Scarborough in 1558.
