= John Sapcote (MP for Ripon) =

16th-century English politician

John Sapcote (died 1574), of Therfield, Hertfordshire and Lincolnshire, was an English politician.

He was a member (MP) of the parliament of England for Ripon in 1559.
