= Edwin Lascelles (MP for Ripon) =

British politician

Edwin Lascelles (1799 in Harewood – 25 April 1865 in Wighill Park, near Wetherby) was a British Conservative Party politician. He was Member of Parliament (MP) for Ripon from 1846 to 1857.

Lascelles was a younger son of Henry Lascelles, 2nd Earl of Harewood. He graduated B.C.L. from All Souls College, Oxford in 1826, and was called to the Bar from the Inner Temple in the same year. Returned MP for Ripon without a contest in January 1846, he was re-elected in 1852 and retired in 1857.

He died suddenly, of apoplexy.

Parliament of the United Kingdom
Preceded by Thomas Berry Cusack Smith; Sir George Cockburn	Member of Parliament for Ripon; 1846 – 1857; With: Sir George Cockburn to 1847; Sir James Graham 1847–1852; William Beckett from 1852	Succeeded by John Greenwood; John Ashley Warre
