= Thomas Duncombe (died 1746) =

British Tory politician

Thomas Duncombe (c.1683–1746) of Duncombe Park, Yorks was a British Tory politician who sat in the House of Commons in two parliaments between 1711 and 1741

Duncombe was born Thomas Browne, the only son of Thomas Browne, merchant, of St Margaret's, Westminster and his wife Ursula Duncombe, daughter of Alexander Duncombe of Drayton, Buckinghamshire. His father was involved with his uncle, the banker Sir Charles Duncombe, in making government loans in the reign of Charles II and continued to do so on his own after 1690, lending various sums.. He matriculated at Christ Church, Oxford on 27 April 1703, aged 19 and was admitted at Inner Temple in 1709. In 1711 he succeeded to the Yorkshire estates, of his uncle Sir Charles Duncombe and assumed the name of Duncombe. He married Sarah Slingsby, daughter of Sir Thomas Slingsby, 4th Baronet, of Scriven, Yorkshire on 18 August 1714.

Duncombe was returned unopposed as Member of Parliament for Downton in a by-election on 9 May 1711 in succession to his late uncle. He was acting as a stop-gap for the rest of that Parliament and was probably a Tory like the rest of his family. He is not recorded as having voted in any of the divisions during his time in Parliament but it is not possible to distinguish his contributions from those of other Duncombes. He did not stand for Parliament at the 1713 British general election.

Duncombe succeeded to the estates of his father in 1720. He was High Sheriff of Yorkshire for the year 1727 to 1728. At the 1734 British general election, he was returned as MP for Ripon by John Aislabie, whose daughter had married his brother-in-law, Sir Henry Slingsby, 5th Baronet. He voted against the Administration, was not asked to stand at the 1741 British general election,

Duncombe died on 23 March 1746 leaving three sons and two daughters. His eldest son, Thomas also became a British politician

Parliament of Great Britain
Preceded by Sir Charles Duncombe; John Eyre	Member of Parliament for Downton; 1711–1713; With: John Eyre	Succeeded by John Sawyer; John Eyre
Preceded by William Aislabie II; William Aislabie III	Member of Parliament for Ripon; 1734–1741; With: William Aislabie III	Succeeded by William Aislabie III; Hon. Henry Vane
