= William Aislabie (died 1773) =

British politician

William Aislabie (died 1773), of Ditton, Surrey, was a British politician who sat in the House of Commons from 1727 to 1734.

Aislabie was born before 1706, the only son of William Aislabie of Waverley governor of Bombay and brother of John Aislabie.

At the 1727 British general election, Aislabie was brought in as Member of Parliament for Ripon by his cousin, William Aislabie of Studley Royal. He is not recorded in any division list and seems to have made no speeches. He did not stand at the 1734 British general election.

Aislabie was married and died on 11 April 1773 leaving one son.

Parliament of Great Britain
Preceded by William Aislabie; John Scrope	Member of Parliament for Ripon; 1727 – 1734; With: William Aislabie	Succeeded by William Aislabie; Thomas Duncombe
