= Martin Birkhead =

16th-century English politician

Martin Birkhead (died 1590), of Wakefield and York, was an English politician.

He was a member (MP) of the parliament of England for Ripon in 1571 and 1572.
