= Anthony Roane =

16th-century English politician

Anthony Roane (died 1583), of Hounslow, Middlesex, was an English politician.

He was a member (MP) of the parliament of England for Ripon in 1571.
