= William Spencer (MP for Ripon) =

16th-century English politician

William Spencer (c. 1552 – 18 December 1609), of Yarnton, Oxfordshire, was an English politician.

He was a member (MP) of the parliament of England for Ripon in 1584 and 1586.
