= John Yorke (c.1566–1634) =

English landowner (c.1566–1634)

John Yorke or Yorke (c.1566–1634) was an English landowner and mining entrepreneur.

== Career ==
He was a son of Peter Yorke of Gouthwaite in Nidderdale, Yorkshire and Elizabeth, daughter of William Ingleby of Ripley Castle. He was knighted at Windsor Castle in 1603.

Yorke's right to hunt at Appletreewick was disputed by Francis Clifford, 4th Earl of Cumberland, who contended it was part of the Forest of Skipton. Local landowners quarrelled over the ownership of lucrative lead mines, especially at Bewerley, which Yorke disputed with Stephen Proctor.

Yorke built a smelting mill at Heathfield for his Appletreewick and Stonebeck Down mines, possibly around 1599 when he made an agreement with Thomas Benson for transporting ore across Bewerley common.

== 1605 and the mystery visitors ==
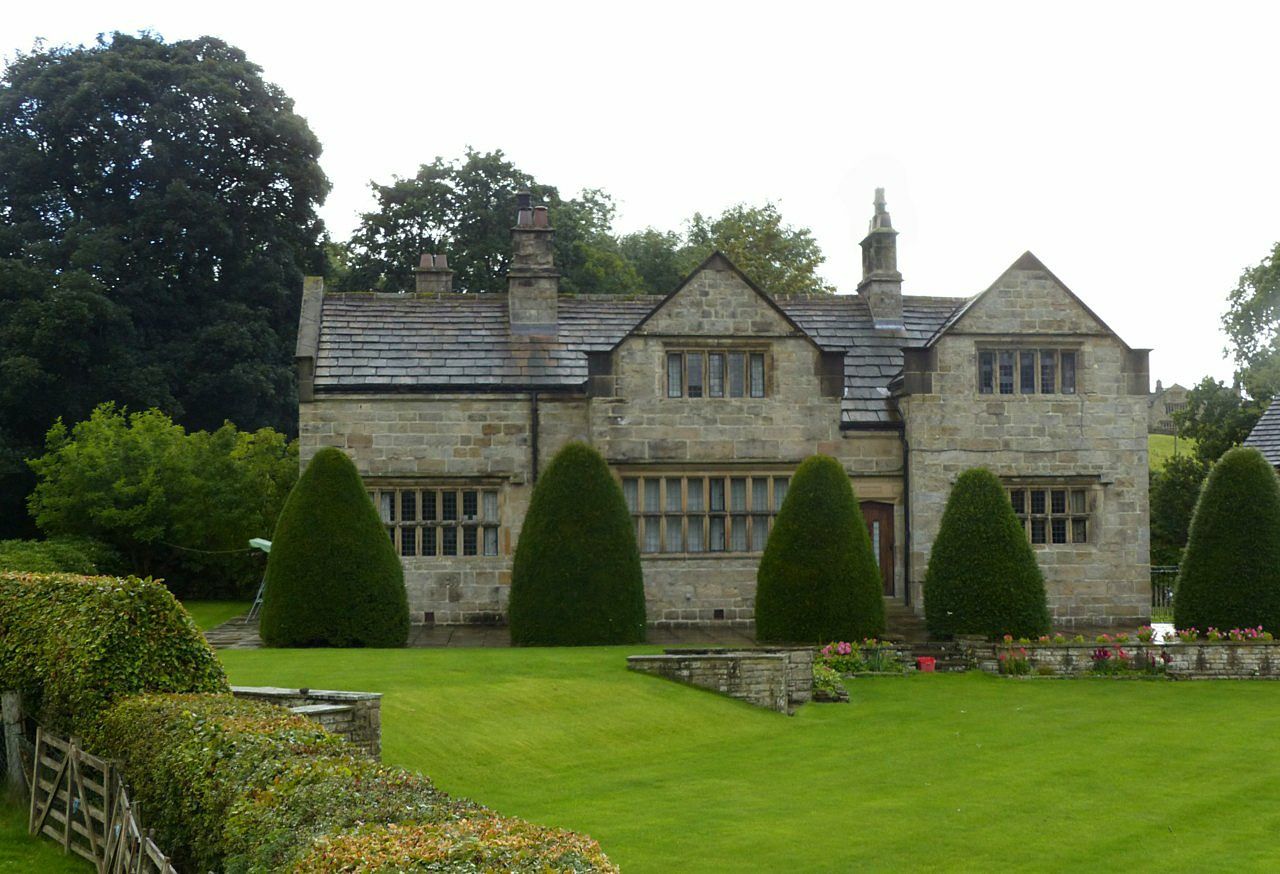
Gouthwaite Hall, rebuilt after the construction of Gouthwaite Reservoir

Yorke's name was mentioned in investigations following the Gunpowder Plot. It was said that Robert and Thomas Wintour had visited his house in Nidderdale shortly before Michaelmas 1605, before visiting Ripley Castle.

Robert Joye, a stonemason who had worked for Yorke at Gouthwaite Hall in 1605, said that Yorke's steward Marmaduke Lupton made him vacate the great hall of the house one evening and move into the buttery. Joye said he was able to peek into the hall and saw Yorke and his wife welcome a stranger called "Mr Jarrett" who was subsequently lodged in the attic. Joye heard from Yorke's cook Hodgeson that "Mr Jarrett" had departed for Ripley Castle, the home of Sir William Ingleby. It was suggested the visitor was a priest, and specifically John Gerard, but his known movements do not suggest a visit to Yorkshire. Lady Yorke's guest may have been her cousin Ralph Hansby.

Joye made his statement to Stephen Proctor at Fountains Hall during a later investigation, and claimed that he had seen the three Wintours at Gouthwaite about "the later Lady Day in harvest" in 1605 before the discovery of the plot. Another witness, William Browne, said his father had told him about calivers, muskets, and halberds stockpiled at Gouthwaite. Another witness said that Robert Wintour had remarked "Well! Wee are now even upon the pointe of blowing up the Parliament house". All this testimony was doubtful in the context of the rivalry between Yorke and Proctor as landlords and their ability to influence witnesses.

== Theatre at Gouthwaite Hall ==
Stephen Proctor complained that Yorke hosted Catholic recusant players, led by the Simpson brothers, at Gouthwaite Hall at Christmas 1609 and Candlemas 1610. They performed an illegal interlude which showed a debate between a Catholic priest and minister. The testimony of one of the actors, William Harrison, mentions their repertoire, including King Lear and Pericles. The minister of Thirkleby, Robert Fairbank, had a warrant for the arrest of the players. He sent one Robert Brown to take them at the house of the Danby family, but the hosts let them escape.

Proctor claimed that Yorke had harboured Jesuits in priest holes, including John Gerard, and was involved in the Gunpowder Plot. His servants were said to disrupt church services with merry making, "theire piping and revellinge wolde make such a noyse in time of praier, as the mynyster colde not well be heard".

George Abbott, Archbishop of Canterbury took charge of the case because of the mention of John Gerard, and he wrote to James VI and I about progress on 25 January 1612. He thought "new advertisements from Yorkshire" would "give us good light to the powder treason itself". Reports of Gerard in Yorkshire or at Gouthwaite proved illusory, though a further search revealed hidden accommodation in the attic. The case came before the Star Chamber, and Yorke was fined £3,000.

John Chamberlain wrote about Yorke and Ingleby in November 1611, as Yorkshire men "called into question as it were post liminio for the powder question". In July 1614 he wrote that the Gouthwaite Christmas play had included "foul passages to the vilifying of our religion, and exalting of Popery". Yorke and his wife, Lady Julian, were held in the Fleet Prison until their release in February 1617 after their fines were paid.

== Family and later life ==
Yorke married Julian Hansby, a daughter of Ralph Hansby of Beverley and Tickhill. She was a Catholic recusant and a great aunt of the diarist Alice Thornton. John Yorke died in 1634. His executors included Christopher Wandesford. He left Gouthwaithe to a nephew, also called John Yorke.
