= Francis Kempe =

16th-century English politician

Francis Kempe (by 1534 – 1597 or later), of London and Yedding, Middlesex, was an English politician.

He was a member (MP) of the parliament of England for Lincoln in 1558 and Ripon in 1559.
