= Greenhow =

Village in North Yorkshire, England

Coordinates: 54.07°N 1.83°W

- Location within North Yorkshire
- OS grid reference: SE112641
- Civil parish: Bewerley
- Unitary authority: North Yorkshire
- Ceremonial county: North Yorkshire
- Region: Yorkshire and the Humber
- Country: England
- Sovereign state: United Kingdom
- Post town: Harrogate
- Postcode district: HG3
- Dialling code: 01423
- Police: North Yorkshire
- Fire: North Yorkshire
- Ambulance: Yorkshire
- UK Parliament: Skipton and Ripon

Greenhow is a village in North Yorkshire, England, often referred to as Greenhow Hill. The term how derives from the Old Norse word haugr meaning a hill and a mound, so Greenhow literally means 'Green's hill or mound'.

== History ==
The village is about 3 miles (4.8 km) west of Pateley Bridge on the road heading towards Grassington, and is mainly in the civil parish of Bewerley. However, the western end of the village lying to the west of Kell Dyke, commonly known as Craven Cross, lies within the civil parish of Appletreewick. It is one of the highest villages in Yorkshire, at an altitude of between 1,310 and 1,380 feet (400 and 420 m), and one of the few villages in the United Kingdom lying at over 1,300 feet (400 m).

Greenhow is an old mining village that was a major supplier of lead. Sir John Yorke disputed the rights to the mines at "Grenhow" and "Grenehosyke" with Thomas Proctor in 1549. Sir Stephen Proctor bought the Manor of Bewerley, including the mineral rights in 1597. He was also responsible, as part of a settlement with John Armitage over disputed land, for the founding of the actual village of Greenhow. Before this date, the only settlement recorded on the Hill itself was Kell House, where monks of Fountains Abbey lived while guarding the abbey's lead interests.

In 1613, an agreement sought to protect the Greenhow miners' rights: "…there may be cottages erected for the miners and mineral workmen upon the said waste … and also for the keeping of draught oxen and horses for the maintenance of the mines, always leaving the tenants sufficient common".

Joseph Kipling, the grandfather of Rudyard Kipling, was the minister at the Methodist Chapel at Greenhow and Rudyard himself is known to have visited the village. There is a 'Kiplings Cottage' next door to the Miners Arms, but it is not known whether his grandfather actually lived there.

The church in the village (St Mary's) is reputedly the highest parish church in England still in use, though services are now only fortnightly on Sunday evenings plus major feast times.

== Coldstones Quarry ==
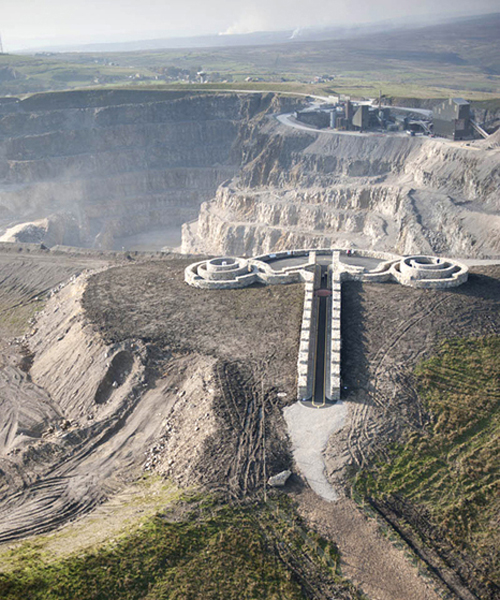
The Coldstones Cut by Andrew Sabin

To the east of the village is Coldstones Quarry, operated by Heidelberg Materials. The quarry is unusual in that it is located on high ground and is not easy to observe from above like most other quarries in the Yorkshire Dales. The quarry produces 600,000 tonnes (660,000 tons) of limestone aggregate per year, with most being used in West and North Yorkshire. Small amounts of fluorspar are also won from the limestone which is sent to Derbyshire for processing. A large public artwork, The Coldstones Cut, created by the artist Andrew Sabin, was opened in 2010 and received the 2011 Marsh Award for Excellence in Public Sculpture.

== Greenhow Hill ==
The name Greenhow Hill is also applied to a section of the B6265 road which runs between Pateley Bridge and Grassington through the village of Greenhow. The road has a very steep descent into Pateley Bridge from Greenhow (between 16 and 19%) and has been the setting for many accidents, especially for people on bicycles. This stretch of road is very popular with cyclists; it was part of the 2016 Tour de Yorkshire and is part of the Way of the Roses bike trail.

Greenhow Hill (1,306 feet/398 m) is also the summit point between Nidderdale to the east and Wharfedale to the west.

== Gallery ==
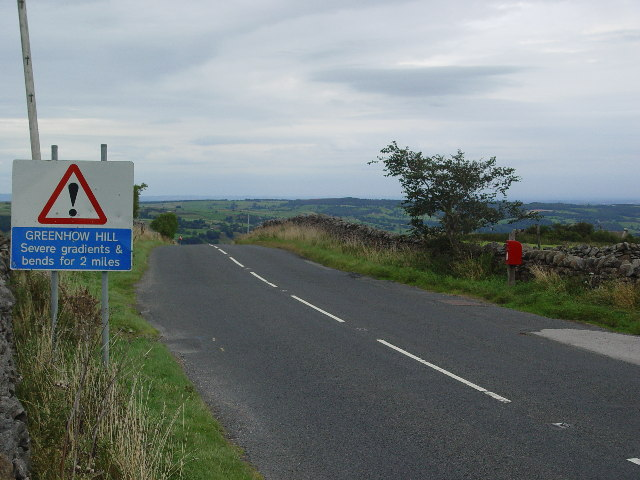
Greenhow Hill, at Toft Gate, looking eastwards. Pateley Bridge is down in the valley out of view.

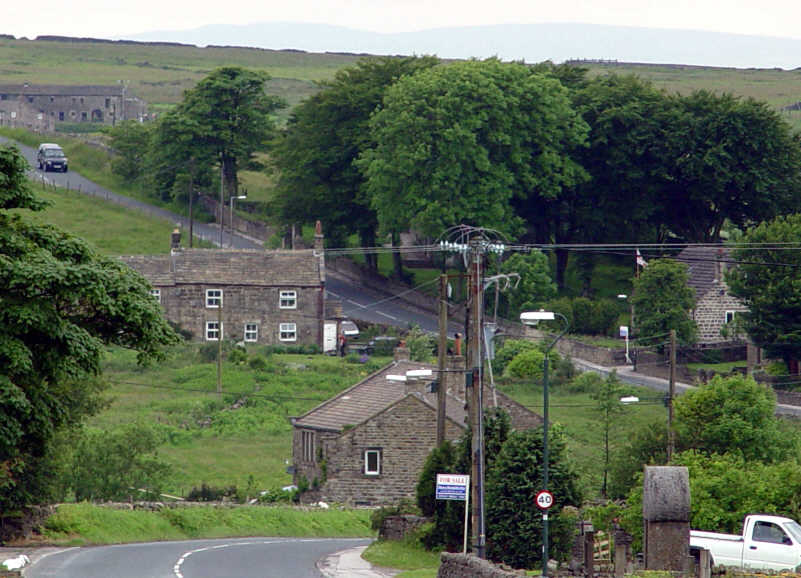
Greenhow Village 2003

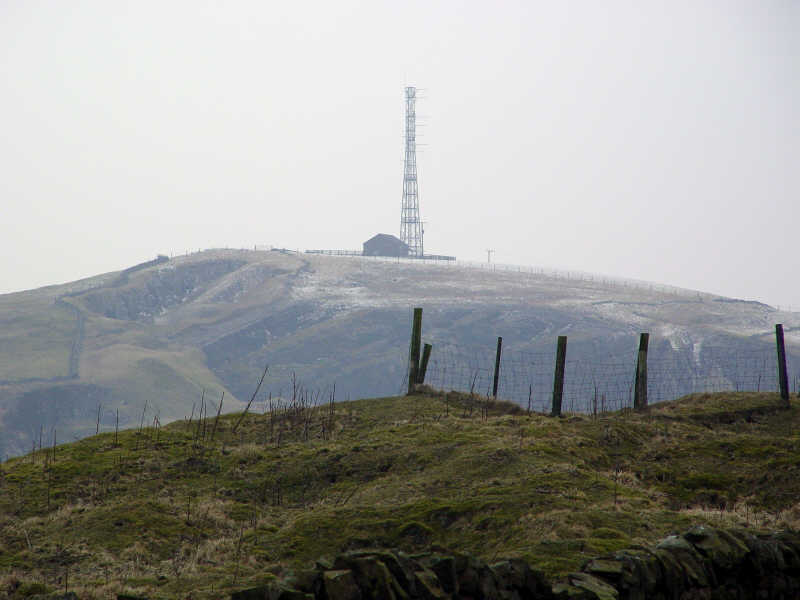
Greenhow Hill summit

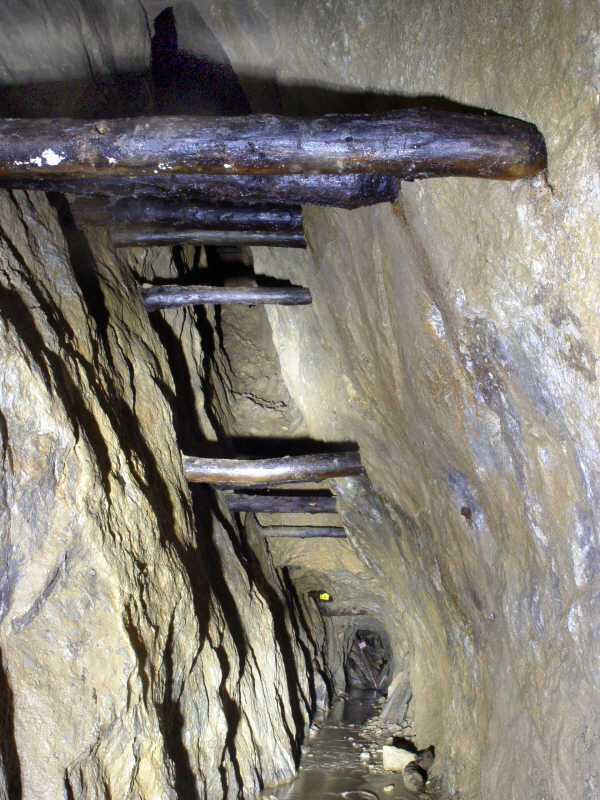
Lead Workings on Sun Vein

== Bibliography ==
- Blackah, Thomas, Songs & Poems written in the Nidderdale Dialect (1867)
- Blackah, Thomas, Dialect Poems & Prose (compiled by Harald Bruff) (1937)
- Bruff, Harald J.L. T'ill an' T'oade uns upuv Greenho (1920)
- Bruff, Harald J.L. T' Miners. Character sketches of old Yorkshire Lead Miners (1924)
- Dunham, Sir Kingsley & Wilson, Albert A, Geology of the Northern Pennine Orefield, Vol 2 Stainmore to Craven (1980)
- Gill, M.C. (1998). The Greenhow Mines. Keighley: Northern Mine Research Society.
- Grainge, William, Nidderdale (1862)
- Greenhow Local History Club. Life on the Hill. Greenhow Local History Club.
- Jennings, Bernard (Ed), A History of Nidderdale (1983)
- Weatherhead, W. History of Netherdale (1839)
