= William Smith (MP for Ripon) =

16th-century English politician

Sir William Smith (c. 1550 – 13 November 1626), of Mounthall, Theydon, Essex, was an English politician.

== Biography ==
Smith was the eldest son of George Smith, a mercer of London. He was educated at Peterhouse, Cambridge. He was the heir of his uncle, the diplomat Sir Thomas Smith, and succeeded to his estates in 1577. It was in this context that Smith took a party of 40 men to Ireland in June 1579 in an attempt to assert his right to his uncle's failed Protestant colony in Clandeboye.

In 1589, he was returned to the Parliament of England as a member of parliament for Ripon, possibly under the patronage of William Cecil, 1st Baron Burghley.

In Essex, Smith was a leading member of the county gentry. In 1590, he was appointed a justice of the peace and in 1601 he served as provost marshal for the county. He was knighted in 1603 and in 1605 he accompanied Charles Howard, 1st Earl of Nottingham on his journey to Spain to take up post as ambassador. Smith served a term as High Sheriff of Essex in 1619–20 and was appointed a deputy lieutenant.

In 1570, Smith married Bridget, a daughter of Thomas Fleetwood. Together, they had three sons and four daughters, one of whom, Elizabeth, married William Spring of Pakenham. Smith died in London in 1626. He was buried in Theydon where a monument was erected in his memory by his widow.
