= Anthony Wingfield (MP for Ripon) =

Member of the Parliament of England

Anthony Wingfield (1550?–1615?), one of a number of figures from the same family of his period, was an English scholar and Member of Parliament, known as reader in Greek to Queen Elizabeth I.

== Life ==
Born probably in or soon after 1550, was the third son of Richard Wingfield of Wantisden, Suffolk, by his wife Mary, younger sister of Bess of Hardwick; Anthony Wingfield was his grandfather, and John Wingfield his brother. He matriculated as a pensioner of Trinity College, Cambridge, in 1569, entered as a student of Gray's Inn in 1572, and was elected scholar of Trinity in 1573. He graduated B.A. in 1573–4, was elected fellow of his college in 1576, and commenced M.A. in 1577.

Possibly through the influence of his uncle Anthony Wingfield (died 1593), usher to Queen Elizabeth, he was appointed reader in Greek to the Queen. On 16 March 1581 he was elected public orator at Cambridge, and in 1582 he accompanied Peregrine Bertie, 13th Baron Willoughby de Eresby, on his embassy to Denmark. In October of the same year he was appointed proctor at Cambridge. On 21 March 1589 he was granted leave of absence by his university on going abroad in the Queen's service, and on condition that he supplied a deputy public orator; this post he resigned on 25 September 1589. On 19 January 1593 the Archbishop of York wrote to the Earl of Shrewsbury asking him to ensure that Wingfield was returned to parliament for one of the towns belonging to the see, and in the following month he was elected for Ripon.

Around the end of Elizabeth's reign, through family influence, Wingfield was appointed tutor to William and Charles Cavendish, the sons of Sir Charles Cavendish.

== Works ==
Wingfield had Latin letters in Epistolæ Academiæ (ii. 468 sqq.) and Latin verses in the university collection on Sir Philip Sidney's death. He wrote a well-known epigram on "The Peer Content", intended for Robert Cecil, 1st Earl of Salisbury. Pedantius, a Latin comedy published in 1631 mocking Gabriel Harvey, is now attributed to Edward Forsett. It may have arisen out of the contest for public orator at Cambridge in 1581, when Wingfield defeated Harvey; and it is suggested that Wingfield had a hand in it.

== Notes ==
Attribution

This article incorporates text from a publication now in the public domain: Lee, Sidney, ed. (1900). "Wingfield, Anthony (1550?-1615?)". Dictionary of National Biography. Vol. 62. London: Smith, Elder & Co.
