= Ripon (constituency) =

Parliamentary constituency in the United Kingdom, 1868–1983

- Former county constituency for the House of Commons
- Boundary of Ripon in the West Riding of Yorkshire, 1974–1983
- County: West Riding of Yorkshire

1885–1983
- Seats: One
- Replaced by: Skipton and Ripon, Leeds North West, Keighley and Shipley

1295–1885
- Seats: Two until 1868, then one
- Type of constituency: Borough constituency

Ripon was a constituency sending members to the House of Commons of England, Great Britain and the House of Commons of the Parliament of the United Kingdom until 1983, centred on the city of Ripon in North Yorkshire.

== History ==
Ripon was first represented in the Model Parliament of 1295, and also returned members in 1307 and 1337, but it was not permanently represented until 1553, after which it returned two Members of Parliament. It was a parliamentary borough consisting only of the town of Ripon itself until the Great Reform Act 1832; the right to vote was vested in the holders of the tightly controlled burgage tenements — count-of-head polls were accordingly rare — for, the last contested election in Ripon before the Reform Act 1832 was in 1715. By 1832 it was estimated that there were 43 men qualified to vote; the total of adult males over age 20 in the township in 1831 was recorded at 3,571.

Such a burgeoning middle class population when considered under the Reform Act 1832 made for Ripon a relatively major borough; its qualifying freehold-owning or more expensive house-leasing electorate were supplemented by such electors in neighbouring Aismunderby-cum-Bondgate. The sum of these male electors returned two members to each parliament. The Reform Act 1867 which came into force at the 1868 election reduced Ripon's representation from two MPs to one and enfranchised many of the under-represented high-growth areas of Britain.

The Redistribution of Seats Act 1885 abolished the borough of Ripon; instead the county constituency in which the town was placed as a result was named Ripon (strictly speaking, at first, "The Ripon Division of the West Riding of Yorkshire"), and this continued as a single member constituency, with intervening boundary changes until it was abolished before the 1983 general election. Until 1950 it included, as well as Ripon itself, the towns of Harrogate and Knaresborough; the post-1950 guise took in Ilkley and Otley.

== Boundaries ==
1885–1918: The Borough of Ripon, the Sessional Divisions of Claro and Kirkby Malzeard, and the Liberty of Ripon.

1918–1950: The Boroughs of Ripon and Harrogate, the Urban District of Knaresborough, the Rural Districts of Knaresborough, Pateley Bridge, and Ripon, and part of the Rural District of Great Ouseburn.

1950–1983: The Borough of Ripon, the Urban Districts of Ilkley and Otley, and the Rural Districts of Ripon and Pateley Bridge, and Wharfedale.

== Members of Parliament ==
- Constituency re-created (1553)

=== MPs 1553–1640 ===
Parliament	First member	Second member
1553 (Oct)	Marmaduke Wyvill	Edward Beseley
1554 (Apr)	William Rastell	John Temple
1554 (Nov)	Thomas More II	Thomas Seckford
1555	John Holmes	Thomas Poley
1558	William Heath	Thomas Lewknor
1559	Francis Kempe	John Sapcote
1562–3	George Leighe	Richard Pratt
1571	Martin Birkhead	Anthony Roane
1572	Martin Birkhead	John Scott
1584	William Spencer	Gervase Lee
1586	William Spencer	Samuel Sandys
1588	Peter York	William Smith
1593	Anthony Wingfield	William Bennet
1597	Sir John Bennet	Christopher Perkins
1601	John Thornborough	Christopher Perkins
1604	Sir John Mallory	Sir John Bennet
1614	Sir Thomas Posthumous Hoby	William Mallory
1621	Sir Thomas Posthumous Hoby	William Mallory
1624	Sir Thomas Posthumous Hoby	William Mallory
1625	Sir Thomas Posthumous Hoby	William Mallory
1626	Thomas Best	Sir Thomas Posthumous Hoby
1628	Sir Thomas Posthumous Hoby	William Mallory
1629–1640	No Parliaments summoned	

=== MPs 1640–1867 ===
Year	First member	First party	Second member	Second party
November 1640	William Mallory	Royalist	John Mallory	Royalist
September 1642	William Mallory disabled to sit - seat vacant		John Mallory	Royalist
January 1644	William Mallory disabled to sit - seat vacant		John Mallory disabled to sit - seat vacant	
1645	Sir Charles Egerton		Miles Moody (d. March 1647)	
1647	Sir Charles Egerton		Sir John Bourchier	
December 1648	Egerton excluded in Pride's Purge - seat vacant		Sir John Bourchier	
1653	Ripon was unrepresented in the Barebones Parliament and the First and Second Parliaments of the Protectorate			
January 1659	Edmund Jennings		Jonathan Jennings	
May 1659	Not represented in the restored Rump			
April 1660	Henry Arthington		Edmund Jennings	
1661	John Nicholas		Thomas Burwell	
1673	John Nicholas		Sir Edmund Jennings	
February 1679	Richard Sterne		Sir Edmund Jennings	
August 1679	Richard Sterne		Christopher Wandesford	
1685	Sir Gilbert Dolben, 1st Baronet		Sir Edmund Jennings	
1689	Sir Jonathan Jennings		Sir Edward Blackett, Bt	
1690	Sir Jonathan Jennings		Sir Edmund Jennings	
1691	Sir Jonathan Jennings		Jonathan Jennings	
1695	John Aislabie	Tory	Jonathan Jennings	
1701	John Aislabie	Tory	John Sharp	
1702	Sir William Hustler		John Sharp	
1705	John Aislabie	Tory, later Country Whig	John Sharp	
1715	John Aislabie	Tory, later Country Whig	The Viscount Castlecomer	
1719	John Aislabie	Tory, later Country Whig	William Aislabie I	
1721	William Aislabie II	Tory	William Aislabie I	
1722	William Aislabie II	Tory	John Scrope	
1727	William Aislabie II	Tory	William Aislabie III	
1734	William Aislabie II	Tory	Thomas Duncombe	
1741	William Aislabie II	Tory	Hon. Henry Vane	Whig
1747	William Aislabie II	Tory	Sir Charles Vernon	
1761	William Aislabie II	Tory	William Lawrence	
1768	William Aislabie II	Tory	Charles Allanson	
1775	William Aislabie II	Tory	William Lawrence	Tory
1780	William Aislabie II	Tory	Frederick Robinson	Tory
1781	William Lawrence	Tory	Frederick Robinson	Tory
1787	William Lawrence	Tory	Sir John Goodricke, Bt	Tory
1789	William Lawrence	Tory	Sir George Allanson-Winn, Bt	Tory
April 1798	William Lawrence	Tory	John Heathcote	Tory
October 1798	Sir James Graham, Bt	Tory	John Heathcote	Tory
1806	Sir James Graham, Bt	Tory	The Lord Headley	Tory
1807	F. J. Robinson	Tory	George Gipps	Tory
1826	F. J. Robinson	Tory	Lancelot Shadwell	Tory
1827	Louis Hayes Petit	Tory	Lancelot Shadwell	Tory
1828	Louis Hayes Petit	Tory	Sir Robert Inglis	Tory
1829	Louis Hayes Petit	Tory	George Spence	Tory
1831	Louis Hayes Petit	Whig	George Spence	Whig
1832	Thomas Staveley	Whig	Joshua Crompton	Whig
1835	Sir Charles Dalbiac	Conservative	Thomas Pemberton	Conservative
1837	Sir Edward Sugden	Conservative	Thomas Pemberton	Conservative
1841	Sir George Cockburn	Conservative	Thomas Pemberton	Conservative
1843	Sir George Cockburn	Conservative	Thomas Cusack-Smith	Conservative
1846	Sir George Cockburn	Conservative	Hon. Edwin Lascelles	Conservative
1847	Sir James Graham, Bt	Peelite	Hon. Edwin Lascelles	Conservative
1852	William Beckett	Conservative	Hon. Edwin Lascelles	Conservative
1857	John Ashley Warre	Whig	John Greenwood	Whig
1859	John Ashley Warre	Liberal	John Greenwood	Liberal
1860	Reginald Vyner	Liberal	John Greenwood	Liberal
1865	Sir Charles Wood	Liberal	Robert Kearsley	Liberal
1866	Lord John Hay	Liberal	Robert Kearsley	Liberal
1868	Representation reduced to one member			

=== MPs 1868–1983 ===
Election	Member	Party
1868	Lord John Hay	Liberal
1871 by-election	Sir Henry Knight Storks	Liberal
1874	Earl de Grey	Liberal
1880	George Goschen	Liberal
1885	Ripon parliamentary borough abolished, replaced by Ripon Division of the West Riding (county constituency)	
1885	William Harker	Liberal
1886	John Lloyd Wharton	Conservative
1906	H. F. B. Lynch	Liberal
Jan. 1910	Hon. Edward Wood	Conservative
1925 by-election	John Hills	Conservative
1939 by-election	Christopher York	Conservative
1950	Sir Malcolm Stoddart-Scott	Conservative
1973 by-election	David Austick	Liberal
Feb 1974	Dr Keith Hampson	Conservative
1983	constituency abolished	

== Election results ==
=== Elections in the 1830s ===
General election 1830: Ripon
Party	Candidate	Votes	%
Tory	Louis Hayes Petit	Unopposed	
Tory	George Spence	Unopposed	
Tory hold			
Tory hold			

General election 1831: Ripon
Party	Candidate	Votes	%
Whig	Louis Hayes Petit	Unopposed	
Whig	George Spence	Unopposed	
Registered electors		43	
Whig gain from Tory			
Whig gain from Tory			

General election 1832: Ripon
Party	Candidate	Votes	%
Whig	Thomas Kitchingman Staveley	168	25.6
Whig	Joshua Samuel Crompton	168	25.6
Tory	James Charles Dalbiac	162	24.7
Tory	William Markham	159	24.2
Majority		6	0.9
Turnout		330	96.8
Registered electors		341	
Whig hold			
Whig hold			

General election 1835: Ripon
Party	Candidate	Votes	%	±%
Conservative	James Charles Dalbiac	246	40.6	+15.9
Conservative	Thomas Pemberton	235	38.8	+14.6
Whig	Thomas Kitchingman Staveley	125	20.6	−30.6
Majority		110	18.2	N/A
Turnout		360	94.0	−2.8
Registered electors		383		
Conservative gain from Whig		Swing	+15.6	
Conservative gain from Whig		Swing	+15.0	

General election 1837: Ripon
Party	Candidate	Votes	%	±%
Conservative	Thomas Pemberton	Unopposed		
Conservative	Edward Sugden	Unopposed		
Registered electors		424		
Conservative hold				
Conservative hold				

=== Elections in the 1840s ===
General election 1841: Ripon
Party	Candidate	Votes	%	±%
Conservative	Thomas Pemberton	Unopposed		
Conservative	Edward Sugden	Unopposed		
Registered electors		373		
Conservative hold				
Conservative hold				

Sugden resigned after being appointed Lord Chancellor of Ireland, causing a by-election.

By-election, 27 September 1841: Ripon
Party	Candidate	Votes	%	±%
Conservative	George Cockburn	Unopposed		
Conservative hold				

Pemberton resigned by accepting the office of Steward of the Chiltern Hundreds, causing a by-election,

By-election, 18 March 1843: Ripon
Party	Candidate	Votes	%	±%
Conservative	Thomas Cusack-Smith	Unopposed		
Conservative hold				

Cusack-Smith resigned after being appointed Master of the Rolls in Ireland, causing a by-election.

By-election, 2 February 1846: Ripon
Party	Candidate	Votes	%	±%
Conservative	Edwin Lacelles	Unopposed		
Conservative hold				

General election 1847: Ripon
Party	Candidate	Votes	%	±%
Conservative	Edwin Lacelles	Unopposed		
Peelite	James Graham	Unopposed		
Registered electors		350		
Conservative hold				
Peelite gain from Conservative				

=== Elections in the 1850s ===
General election 1852: Ripon
Party	Candidate	Votes	%	±%
Conservative	William Beckett	266	49.0	N/A
Conservative	Edwin Lascelles	202	37.2	N/A
Radical	Augustus Newton	75	13.8	New
Majority		127	23.4	N/A
Turnout		309 (est)	87.5 (est)	N/A
Registered electors		353		
Conservative hold		Swing	N/A	
Conservative gain from Peelite		Swing	N/A	

General election 1857: Ripon
Party	Candidate	Votes	%	±%
Whig	John Ashley Warre	Unopposed		
Whig	John Greenwood	Unopposed		
Registered electors		339		
Whig gain from Conservative				
Whig gain from Conservative				

General election 1859: Ripon
Party	Candidate	Votes	%	±%
Liberal	John Greenwood	223	48.6	N/A
Liberal	John Ashley Warre	205	44.7	N/A
Liberal	Alfred Bates Richards	31	6.8	N/A
Majority		174	37.9	N/A
Turnout		230 (est)	68.1 (est)	N/A
Registered electors		337		
Liberal hold		Swing	N/A	
Liberal hold		Swing	N/A	

=== Elections in the 1860s ===
Warre's death caused a by-election.

By-election, 22 December 1860: Ripon
Party	Candidate	Votes	%	±%
Liberal	Reginald Vyner	187	100.0	N/A
Chartist	Frederick Richard Lees	0	0	New
Majority		187	100.0	N/A
Turnout		187	54.5	−13.6
Registered electors		343		
Liberal hold		Swing	N/A	

Lees retired before polling day.

General election 1865: Ripon
Party	Candidate	Votes	%	±%
Liberal	Charles Wood	215	37.3	N/A
Liberal	Robert Kearsley	189	32.8	N/A
Liberal	John Greenwood	173	30.0	−18.6
Majority		16	2.8	−35.1
Turnout		289 (est)	82.9 (est)	+14.8
Registered electors		348		
Liberal hold		Swing	N/A	
Liberal hold		Swing	N/A	

Wood was elevated to the peerage becoming 1st Viscount Halifax and causing a by-election.

By-election, 26 February 1866: Ripon
Party	Candidate	Votes	%	±%
Liberal	John Hay	Unopposed		
Liberal hold				

Hay was appointed a Lord Commissioner of the Admiralty, requiring a by-election.

By-election, 28 March 1866: Ripon
Party	Candidate	Votes	%	±%
Liberal	John Hay	Unopposed		
Liberal hold				

Seat reduced to one member

General election 1868: Ripon
Party	Candidate	Votes	%	±%
Liberal	John Hay	554	57.6	N/A
Conservative	George Cayley	408	42.4	New
Majority		146	15.2	+12.4
Turnout		962	85.0	+2.1
Registered electors		1,132		
Liberal hold		Swing	N/A	

Hay was appointed a Lord Commissioner of the Admiralty, requiring a by-election.

By-election, 21 December 1868: Ripon
Party	Candidate	Votes	%	±%
Liberal	John Hay	Unopposed		
Liberal hold				

=== Elections in the 1870s ===
Hay resigned, causing a by-election.

By-election, 15 Feb 1871: Ripon
Party	Candidate	Votes	%	±%
Liberal	Henry Knight Storks	522	63.3	+5.7
Conservative	George Cayley	302	36.7	−5.7
Majority		220	26.6	+11.4
Turnout		824	79.6	−5.4
Registered electors		1,035		
Liberal hold		Swing	+5.7	

General election 1874: Ripon
Party	Candidate	Votes	%	±%
Liberal	Frederick Robinson	Unopposed		
Registered electors		1,025		
Liberal hold				

=== Elections in the 1880s ===
General election 1880: Ripon
Party	Candidate	Votes	%	±%
Liberal	George Goschen	591	62.0	N/A
Conservative	Francis Darwin	362	38.0	New
Majority		229	24.0	N/A
Turnout		953	87.7	N/A
Registered electors		1,087		
Liberal hold		Swing	N/A	

General election 1885: Ripon
Party	Candidate	Votes	%	±%
Liberal	William Harker	3,985	51.1	−10.9
Conservative	John Lloyd Wharton	3,820	48.9	+10.9
Majority		165	2.2	−21.8
Turnout		7,805	86.3	−1.4
Registered electors		9,049		
Liberal hold		Swing	−10.9	

J. L. Wharton

General election 1886: Ripon
Party	Candidate	Votes	%	±%
Conservative	John Lloyd Wharton	4,113	56.8	+7.9
Liberal	Claude Ashley Charles Ponsonby	3,125	43.2	−7.9
Majority		988	13.6	N/A
Turnout		7,238	80.0	−6.3
Registered electors		9,049		
Conservative gain from Liberal		Swing	+7.9	

=== Elections in the 1890s ===
General election 1892: Ripon
Party	Candidate	Votes	%	±%
Conservative	John Lloyd Wharton	4,268	53.9	−2.9
Liberal	Henry Leetham	3,657	46.1	+2.9
Majority		611	7.8	−5.8
Turnout		7,925	77.7	−2.3
Registered electors		10,199		
Conservative hold		Swing	−2.9	

Phillimore

General election 1895: Ripon
Party	Candidate	Votes	%	±%
Conservative	John Lloyd Wharton	4,435	54.3	+0.4
Liberal	Robert Charles Phillimore	3,733	45.7	−0.4
Majority		702	8.6	+0.8
Turnout		8,168	79.9	+2.2
Registered electors		10,219		
Conservative hold		Swing	+0.4	

=== Elections in the 1900s ===
General election 1900: Ripon
Party	Candidate	Votes	%	±%
Conservative	John Lloyd Wharton	Unopposed		
Conservative hold				

Henry Lynch

General election 1906: Ripon
Party	Candidate	Votes	%	±%
Liberal	H. F. B. Lynch	5,645	51.4	New
Conservative	John Lloyd Wharton	5,332	48.6	N/A
Majority		313	2.8	N/A
Turnout		10,977	86.9	N/A
Registered electors		12,635		
Liberal gain from Conservative		Swing	N/A	

=== Elections in the 1910s ===
General election January 1910: Ripon
Party	Candidate	Votes	%	±%
Conservative	Edward Wood	6,363	55.4	+6.8
Liberal	H. F. B. Lynch	5,119	44.6	−6.8
Majority		1,244	10.8	N/A
Turnout		11,482	89.3	+2.4
Registered electors		12,860		
Conservative gain from Liberal		Swing	+6.8	

General election December 1910: Ripon
Party	Candidate	Votes	%	±%
Conservative	Edward Wood	5,894	54.0	−1.4
Liberal	Norman Rae	5,020	46.0	+1.4
Majority		874	8.0	−2.8
Turnout		10,914	84.9	−4.4
Registered electors		12,860		
Conservative hold		Swing	−1.4	

General election 1914–15:

Another general election was required to take place before the end of 1915. The political parties had been making preparations for an election to take place and by July 1914, the following candidates had been selected;

- Unionist: Edward Wood
- Liberal:

General election 1918: Ripon
Party		Candidate	Votes	%	±%
C	Unionist	Edward Wood	Unopposed		
	Unionist hold				
C indicates candidate endorsed by the coalition government.

=== Elections in the 1920s ===
General election 1922: Ripon
Party	Candidate	Votes	%	±%
Unionist	Edward Wood	Unopposed		
Unionist hold				

General election 1923: Ripon
Party	Candidate	Votes	%	±%
Unionist	Edward Wood	Unopposed		
Unionist hold				

General election 1924: Ripon
Party	Candidate	Votes	%	±%
Unionist	Edward Wood	Unopposed		
Unionist hold				

1925 Ripon by-election
Party	Candidate	Votes	%	±%
Unionist	John Hills	16,433	59.0	N/A
Liberal	John Murray	11,422	41.0	New
Majority		5,011	18.0	N/A
Turnout		27,855	74.6	N/A
Registered electors		37,338		
Unionist hold		Swing	N/A	

General election 1929: Ripon
Party	Candidate	Votes	%	±%
Unionist	John Hills	23,173	55.1	N/A
Liberal	Frederick L. Boult	14,542	34.6	N/A
Labour	Arthur Godfrey	4,339	10.3	New
Majority		8,631	20.5	N/A
Turnout		42,054	76.2	N/A
Registered electors		55,191		
Unionist hold		Swing	N/A	

=== Elections in the 1930s ===
General election 1931: Ripon
Party	Candidate	Votes	%	±%
Conservative	John Hills	37,898	88.1	+33.0
Labour	Robert Joseph Hall	5,125	11.9	+1.6
Majority		32,773	76.2	+55.7
Turnout		43,023	73.7	−2.5
Conservative hold		Swing		

General election 1935: Ripon
Party	Candidate	Votes	%	±%
Conservative	John Hills	30,804	77.16	
Labour	Robert Joseph Hall	9,116	22.84	
Majority		21,688	54.32	
Turnout		39,920	68.64	
Conservative hold		Swing		

1939 Ripon by-election
Party	Candidate	Votes	%	±%
Conservative	Christopher York	23,257	69.49	
Labour	Robert Joseph Hall	10,213	30.51	
Majority		13,044	38.98	
Turnout		33,470		
Conservative hold		Swing		

=== Elections in the 1940s ===
General election 1945: Ripon
Party	Candidate	Votes	%	±%
Conservative	Christopher York	29,674	61.3	−15.9
Labour	R. Hartley	12,599	26.0	+3.2
Liberal	Mabel Cowley	6,122	12.6	New
Majority		17,075	35.3	−19.0
Turnout		48,395	69.8	+1.2
Conservative hold		Swing		

=== Elections in the 1950s ===
General election 1950: Ripon
Party	Candidate	Votes	%	±%
Conservative	Malcolm Stoddart-Scott	22,292	66.3	+5.0
Labour	W. S. Hill	11,317	33.7	+7.7
Majority		10,975	32.6	−2.7
Turnout		33,609	84.0	+14.2
Conservative hold		Swing		

General election 1951: Ripon
Party	Candidate	Votes	%	±%
Conservative	Malcolm Stoddart-Scott	23,047	68.4	+2.1
Labour	Sydney J. Andrews	10,627	31.6	−2.1
Majority		12,420	36.9	+4.3
Turnout		33,674	83.2	−0.8
Conservative hold		Swing		

General election 1955: Ripon
Party	Candidate	Votes	%	±%
Conservative	Malcolm Stoddart-Scott	21,977	68.9	+0.5
Labour	Eric Brierley	9,912	31.1	−0.5
Majority		12,065	37.8	+0.9
Turnout		34,042	78.8	−4.4
Conservative hold		Swing		

General election 1959: Ripon
Party	Candidate	Votes	%	±%
Conservative	Malcolm Stoddart-Scott	22,757	69.9	+1.0
Labour	Joseph H. Swann	9,791	30.1	−1.0
Majority		12,966	39.8	+2.0
Turnout		32,548	79.0	+0.2
Conservative hold		Swing		

=== Elections in the 1960s ===
General election 1964: Ripon
Party	Candidate	Votes	%	±%
Conservative	Malcolm Stoddart-Scott	18,503	54.9	−15.0
Liberal	Ronald H. H. Duncan	7,814	23.2	New
Labour	Peter A. O'Grady	7,341	21.8	−8.3
Majority		10,689	31.7	−8.1
Turnout		33,658	80.6	+1.6
Conservative hold		Swing		

General election 1966: Ripon
Party	Candidate	Votes	%	±%
Conservative	Malcolm Stoddart-Scott	17,352	52.2	−2.7
Labour	Michael McGowan	8,607	25.9	+4.1
Liberal	Ronald H. H. Duncan	7,301	22.0	−1.2
Majority		8,745	26.3	−5.4
Turnout		33,260	78.9	−1.7
Conservative hold		Swing		

=== Elections in the 1970s ===
General election 1970: Ripon
Party	Candidate	Votes	%	±%
Conservative	Malcolm Stoddart-Scott	21,211	60.7	+8.5
Labour	David Daniel	9,147	26.2	+1.3
Liberal	Valerie S. Craven	4,583	13.1	−8.9
Majority		12,064	34.5	+8.2
Turnout		34,941	73.6	−5.3
Conservative hold		Swing		

1973 Ripon by-election
Party	Candidate	Votes	%	±%
Liberal	David Austick	13,902	43.5	+30.4
Conservative	Keith Hampson	12,956	40.5	−20.2
Labour	David Mark English	4,435	13.9	−12.3
Ind. Conservative	R. E. G. Simmerson	690	2.1	New
Majority		946	3.0	N/A
Turnout		31,983	64.3	−9.3
Registered electors		49,761		
Liberal gain from Conservative		Swing		

General election February 1974: Ripon
Party	Candidate	Votes	%	±%
Conservative	Keith Hampson	21,080	49.6	−11.1
Liberal	David Austick	16,745	39.4	+26.3
Labour	David Mark English	4,643	10.9	−15.3
Majority		4,335	10.2	−24.3
Turnout		42,468	85.4	+11.8
Conservative hold		Swing		

General election October 1974: Ripon
Party	Candidate	Votes	%	±%
Conservative	Keith Hampson	20,636	52.1	+2.5
Liberal	David Austick	13,632	34.3	−5.1
Labour	Stephen Peter Meyer	5,330	13.5	+2.6
Majority		7,004	17.8	+7.6
Turnout		39,598	78.9	−6.5
Conservative hold		Swing		

General election 1979: Ripon
Party	Candidate	Votes	%	±%
Conservative	Keith Hampson	25,292	60.3	+8.2
Liberal	Robert Tennant	9,089	21.7	−12.6
Labour	William Neil Davies	6,749	16.1	+2.6
Ecology	Alistair Laurence	781	1.9	New
Majority		16,203	38.6	+20.8
Turnout		41,911	78.8	−0.1
Conservative hold		Swing		

== See also ==
- 1973 Ripon by-election
