= Grewelthorpe =

Village and civil parish in North Yorkshire, England

Coordinates: 54°10′53″N 1°38′55″W

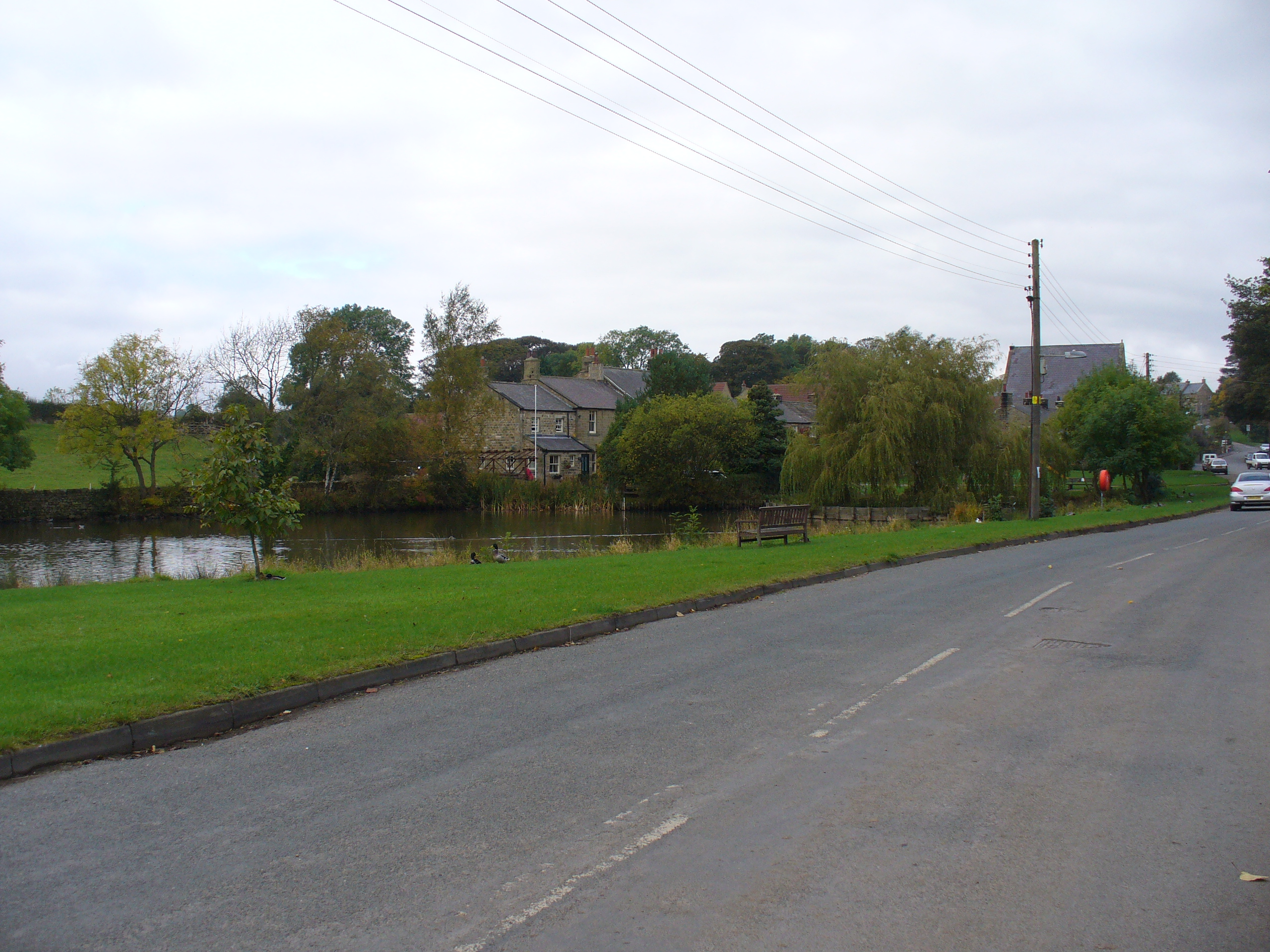
- Grewelthorpe

- Location within North Yorkshire
- Population: 498 (2011 census)
- OS grid reference: SE 22839 76470
- Unitary authority: North Yorkshire
- Ceremonial county: North Yorkshire
- Region: Yorkshire and the Humber
- Country: England
- Sovereign state: United Kingdom
- Post town: RIPON
- Postcode district: HG4
- Police: North Yorkshire
- Fire: North Yorkshire
- Ambulance: Yorkshire
- UK Parliament: Skipton and Ripon

Grewelthorpe is a village and civil parish in the county of North Yorkshire, England situated 3 miles (5 km) south of Masham and 6.2 miles (10 km) north of Ripon. It is located in the Nidderdale area of outstanding natural beauty.

The name Grewelthorpe derives from the words Gruel and Thorpe, Gruel being a family name and thorpe meaning "outlying farmstead".

Grewelthorpe was mentioned in the Domesday Book when it was known as Torp and was in the ownership of Gospatric. Until 1974 it was part of the West Riding of Yorkshire. From 1974 to 2023 it was part of the Borough of Harrogate. It is now administered by the unitary North Yorkshire Council.

In 2009 Grewelthorpe had one active church, St James' Church, Grewelthorpe, and a pub, the Crown, both listed buildings. It also has a duck pond, which is a distinctive feature of the village, it is populated by ducks which people come from surrounding villages to feed.

Grewelthorpe has had a school since 1876. The local primary school now is Grewelthorpe Church of England Primary School, which takes children from two years old to eleven years old. The current school building was opened in June 2003 and is located at Cross Hills in Grewelthorpe.

A privately operated Himalayan garden and sculpture park is located on Hutts Lane, to the west of the village. The site was purchased by its current owners in 1996.

Unlike many Yorkshire villages, Grewelthorpe does not currently have a cricket club. It last had one in the 1950s, but it folded as a result of the failure to find a suitable playing field.

== Hackfall ==
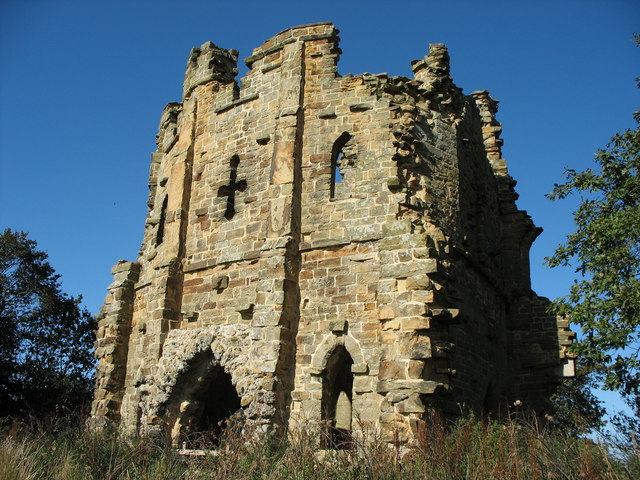
Mowbray Castle

On the edge of the village of Grewelthorpe is Hack Fall Wood, otherwise known as Hackfall, which is a Grade I Garden in English Heritage's Register of Historic Parks and Gardens. Although it appears to be a natural wood, the landscape that can be seen today was in large part a result of design and work undertaken by the Aislabies of Studley Royal. In Victorian times it was a popular attraction: there are grottos, surprise views, waterfalls, a fountain and several follies, including Mowbray Castle, a ruin in a prominent hill-top position.

After a long period of neglect, restoration has been undertaken in the 1980s by the Hackfall Trust and the Woodland Trust, with the help of a grant from the Heritage Lottery Fund and a 999-year lease. Hackfall is open to the public.

A seventeen and a half mile walking circuit has been created that links Hackfall with Studley Royal called the Aislabie Walk.

== See also ==
- Listed buildings in Grewelthorpe
