= John York (Master of the Mint) =

Member of the Parliament of England

Sir John York or Yorke (c.1490-1569) was an English merchant and landowner who became Master of the Mint and a Member of Parliament.

== Life ==
=== Early career ===
He was born about 1490,the third son of John Yorke, by his wife Katherine Patterdale or Patterdall. His grandfather, Sir Richard Yorke, was a merchant in York, and in 1466 was Mayor of the Staple at Calais. Sir Richard's son Thomas, John's uncle, was also a merchant, and John appears to have joined the family business and spent time as a merchant in Calais and Antwerp.

On 3 September 1535, he arrived at Calais from Antwerp with intelligence of a sermon preached against King Henry VIII, by a friar in Antwerp. The Lord Deputy of Calais, Lord Lisle, passed on the report to Thomas Cromwell, and York received a reward. In 1544 he was appointed assay master to the Mint. In 1547 he was promoted to be Master of the Mint at Southwark, established in the former mansion of Charles Brandon, Duke of Suffolk.

In 1549, he was sheriff of London. In October of this year the quarrel had broken out between the Lord Protector Edward Seymour, 1st Duke of Somerset and John Dudley, Earl of Warwick. Somerset as a defensive move had retired with King Edward VI to Hampton Court, and asked the City of London to furnish him with a thousand men for the royal protection. Warwick, in order to counteract him, moved into the city and stayed at York's house in Walbrook from 6 October 1549. The city came onto Warwick's side. On 8 October the confederate lords dined together at York's house, and on the following day the common council responded to their summons of aid by promising a contingent of soldiers to support them. As a reward for his services Edward VI visited York at his official residence in Southwark on 17 October, and, after dining there, knighted him. Somerset, having been confined in the Tower of London, was brought to York's house at Walbrook on 6 February following, and there released on his recognisances. Here the privy council again sat two days after, probably for security.

York appears to have enjoyed at this time the office of master of the king's woods. Edmund Bonner, bishop of London, was deprived of office on 1 October 1549, and the temporalities of the see passed to the crown. York thereupon began felling the bishop's woods. The privy council on 24 February 1550 issued an injunction against him, further prohibiting him from removing the woods already felled, which suggests suspicions of peculation. He apparently disobeyed, for a fresh prohibition was issued on 17 March. On the following 14 June the council again wrote to him, this time forbidding him to continue felling the king's woods near Deptford, the timber to be preserved for naval purposes. Meanwhile, York was active in his duties at the mint, at a time when changes in the coinage followed each other in rapid succession.

=== Currency speculation ===
During some time in the summer of 1550, York was employed in secret missions abroad. The king's debts were mounting, and the Privy Council turned to York to solve the problem. He devised a plan to make a large profit on the Antwerp exchange as well as to bring home quality bullion from abroad for the production of new English coin. In December 1550 York went to Antwerp to speculate with the king's money. Things did not go to plan, and by March 1551 he had suffered losses of at least £4000 of silver bullion, when he and his men were caught red-handed trying to smuggle £4000 in bullion out of Antwerp.

However, the scheme did not fail entirely, and as a mint official, York brought in large amounts of bullion on which he made a handsome personal profit. In 1551, he was given the task, with Sir Nicholas Throckmorton, of restoring the coinage. Many of the coins issued were stamped with Y, one of York's mint marks. In 1552, York was pardoned 'for all treasons and offences concerning making and issuing of the king's money', on the condition that he settle his mint accounts for over £9500 'due to the king'.

=== Later career ===
York enriched himself by foreign trading. In May 1553 he formed one of the Russia Company incorporated under a charter of Edward VI. He retained the friendship of the Duke of Northumberland (as John Dudley now was), and he was prominent as a supporter of the claims of Lady Jane Grey. On 23 July 1553, after the collapse of the Grey conspiracy and two days later than the duke, York was put under arrest in his own house by the lord mayor. On 30 July the privy council issued a warrant for his committal to the Tower of London. An inventory of his goods was ordered, and they were seized to Queen Mary's use. Sixty cloths which were being exported by him were stopped at Dover. On 31 July he was sent to the Tower, being confined in the Bell Tower.

On 18 October he was released. After his release, on 5 November 1553, York attended at St Stephen's, Walbrook, the sermon of John Feckenham, Queen Mary's private chaplain and confessor. He was at this time an alderman of the city; but his place at the Mint had been filled, and he does not reappear in public life till after the accession of Elizabeth. In 1559 he was elected MP for Boroughbridge, Yorkshire. On 5 October 1560, when a project of recoinage was under consideration, York wrote to William Cecil a letter of advice, winding up with a request for Cecil's interest in his favour. Among his recommendations was one for the employment of foreign refiners, as being of superior skill. It would appear from a letter from a Flemish company to Sir Thomas Gresham, written from Antwerp in this year, that York actually went to Flanders on this business but he was not reinstated in office at the Mint. He died some time before the end of 1569.

== Landed estates ==
York's merchant activities and his career as a mint official enabled him to enrich himself. He acquired land at Woolwich in Kent and at Barking and East Ham in Essex. In 1547 he bought the former Byland Abbey estates (Stonebeck Up and Stonebeck Down) in Nidderdale in Yorkshire, including Gouthwaite, a house which his father had apparently occupied. In 1549 he bought the manor of Appletreewick in Wharfedale, a former possession of Bolton Priory, which included the valuable lead mining area of Greenhow Hill. In 1551 he bought the former lands of Whitby Abbey from his friend John Dudley, Earl of Warwick. Also in about 1551 he bought from the Duke of Suffolk the manor of Austwick and neighbouring manors.

While York was imprisoned in 1553, the inhabitants of Whitby, tenants of the lands of Whitby Abbey, took advantage of his imprisonment to bring an action against him in the Court of Requests for excessive raising of their rents. On 24 October the court gave judgment against him. About the same time another action was brought against him in the same court by Avere or Alvered Uvedale, mineral lessee of the Byland Abbey lands, complaining that York had refused to allow the plaintiff to cut down timber for his mines, and had seized a large quantity of lead ore belonging to him. The issue of this case has not been preserved.

== Family ==
York married Anne or Anna, daughter of Robert Smyth of London. According to the ‘Visitation of Yorkshire’ of 1563–4, and Glover's ‘Visitation of Yorkshire’ in 1584–5, Lady York afterwards married Robert Paget of London; but according to the ‘Visitation of London’ in 1560 she was the widow of one Pagett when she married York. Six of York's sons were still alive when he wrote his will in 1562: Peter, William, Edmund, Rowland, Edward, and Henry. He also left two daughters. He left most of his estates, including his Nidderdale and Wharfedale properties, to his son Peter.

The spelling of the name, both in the signature of his letter to William Cecil, 1st Baron Burghley and in the plea put in by him in his defence against the tenants of Whitby in the court of requests, is York.
