= Francis Eure =

17th-century English politician

Sir Francis Eure (ca. 1564–1621) was an English Member of Parliament for Scarborough and Chief Justice of North Wales. Serving from 1604 until 1614, he spent much of his time in Parliament on religious issues.

== Early life ==
Eure was a younger son of William Eure, 2nd Baron Eure by his wife Margaret Dymoke. The Eures were an old gentry family of Yorkshire with a long history of service in the Scottish Marches. Eure's elder brother, Ralph, succeeded their father to the barony after his death in 1594, while his nephew, William, was an MP in the same constituency that Francis would later represent. It appears likely that Eure served in the Middle March during his brother's time as Lord Warden of the Marches.

== Career ==
Francis Eure spent five years as a student at Gray's Inn before being advanced to the bar. His nephew, William, MP for Scarborough since 1601, had fallen into disgrace after an acrimonious dispute with Thomas Posthumous Hoby led to a fine from Star Chamber. Francis Eure stood for election in 1604 and took the seat. While his nephew was a notorious recusant, Francis Eure was a committed Protestant, which was reflected in the causes he championed during his decade of Parliamentary service. Among the bills he favored were acts to bar recusants from serving in Parliament, to punish simony and scandalous ministers, to discourage vexatious suits against clergymen, and enforce observation of the Sabbath. His brother attempted to have him appointed to the parliamentary seat of Richard Benson, the recently deceased MP for Ludlow, despite Francis already holding a seat, but the scheme failed.

Eure did not stand for Parliament in 1614, and later became Chief Justice of North Wales. Because of his local ties, he was expected to transfer to South Wales, but did not; this brought a complaint and call for his removal from a Catholic barrister. Eure refused to step down, and the complainant, Edward Floyd, was later imprisoned on other grounds.

=== Marriages and issue ===
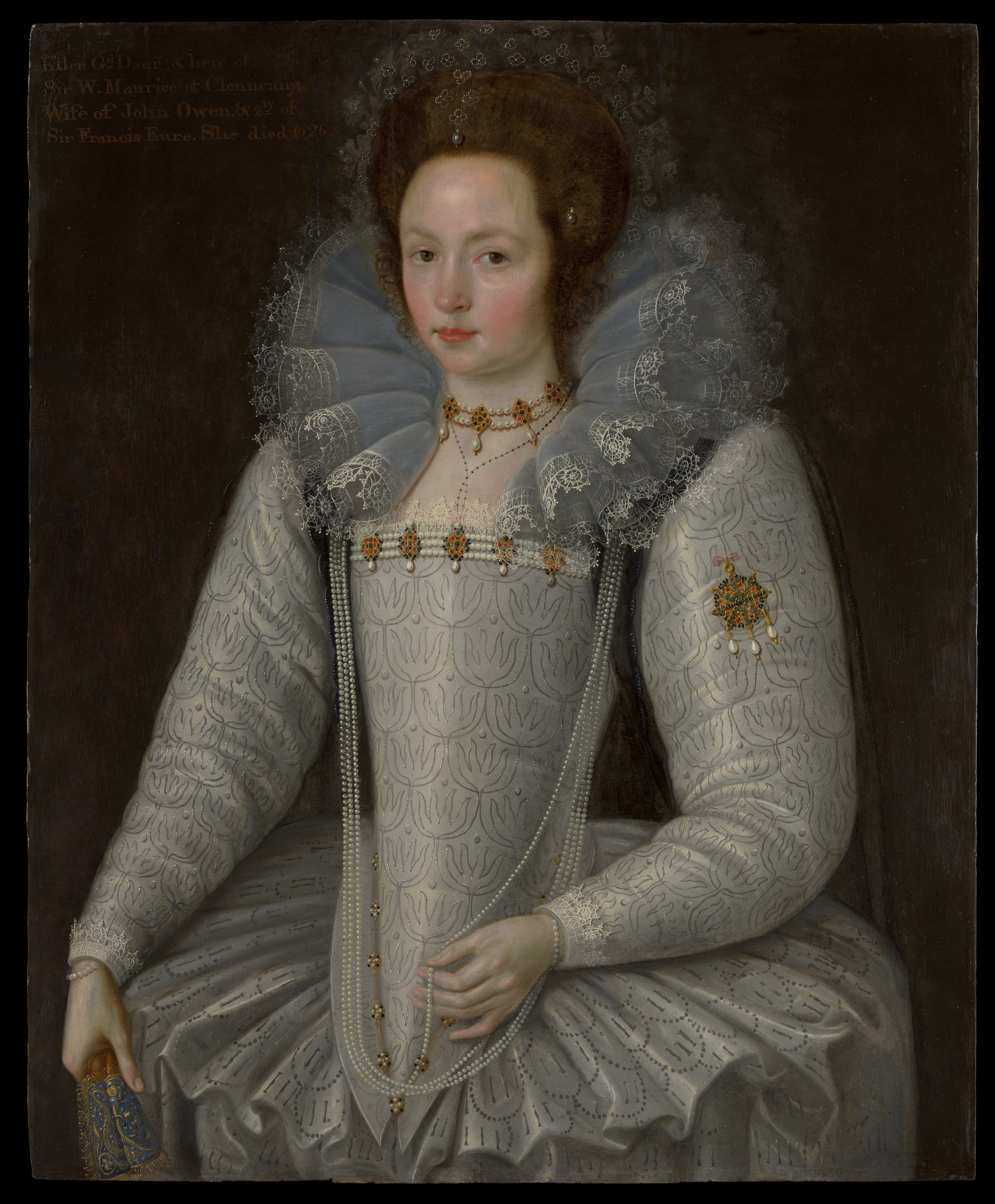
Portrait of Ellen Maurice by Marcus Gheeraerts the Younger, 1597.

Eure married twice, first to Elizabeth Lennard (sister of Sampson Lennard, MP), and second to Ellen Maurice, daughter of William Wynn Maurice of Clenennau, Caern., and widow of John Owen. By his first wife, he had three sons (including Sampson Eure) and one daughter. A son from this marriage, Horace, was the father of the 7th and 8th Barons Eure. By his second wife, he had one son, Compton Eure. Eure died 1 May 1621, survived by his second wife, who completed his establishment of six almshouses in Oswestry.
