= John Mallory (disambiguation) =

John Mallory (1610 – 1655) was an English politician.

John Mallory may also refer to:

- John Mallory (American football)
- John Mallory (died 1434), MP for Warwickshire (UK Parliament constituency)
- John Mallory (died 1619), MP for Ripon and Thirsk
- John Mallory, character in The Jury (TV serial)
