= Ancrum =

Village in Scottish Borders, Scotland

Coordinates: 55.513265°N 2.594581°W

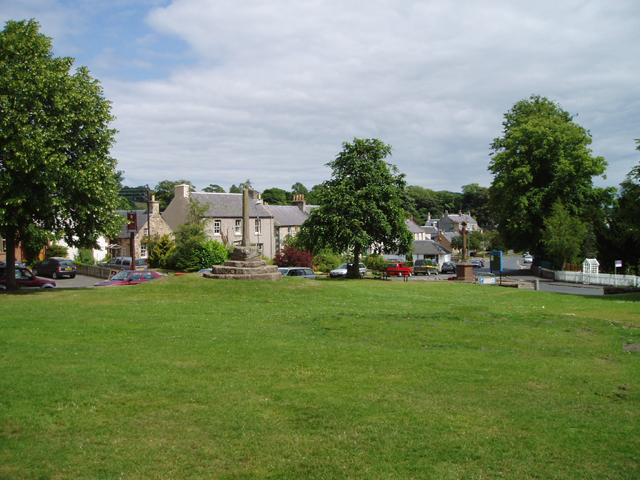
- Village green

- Location within the Scottish Borders
- Population: 500 (2020)
- OS grid reference: NT625245
  - Edinburgh: 38 mi (61 km) NW
- Civil parish: Ancrum
- Community council: Ancrum
- Council area: Scottish Borders
- Lieutenancy area: Roxburgh, Ettrick and Lauderdale
- Country: Scotland
- Sovereign state: United Kingdom
- Post town: JEDBURGH
- Postcode district: TD8
- Dialling code: 01835
- Police: Scotland
- Fire: Scottish
- Ambulance: Scottish
- UK Parliament: Berwickshire, Roxburgh and Selkirk
- Scottish Parliament: Ettrick, Roxburgh and Berwickshire

Ancrum (Scottish Gaelic: Alan Crom) is a village in the Borders area of Scotland, 5 km (3.1 mi) northwest of Jedburgh.

The village — which currently has a population of around 300 — is situated just off the A68 trunk road on the B6400, which runs through Ancrum. Lilliesleaf lies 7 miles (11 km) further along the B6400 and Denholm can be reached along the unclassified road which runs parallel to the River Teviot.

The name of this place, anciently Alne-crumb, is derived from the situation of its village on a bend of the River Alne, now the Ale. There were formerly two villages distinguished by the appellations of Over Ancrum and Nether Ancrum, of the former of which nothing now remains.

The principal event of historical importance is the Battle of Ancrum Moor, which originated in an attempt made in 1545, by Ralph Evers and Bryan Layton, to possess themselves of the lands of the Merse and Teviotdale, which had been conferred upon them by a grant of Henry VIII, king of England. Archibald Douglas, 6th Earl of Angus, who had considerable property in that district, determined to resist the attempt, and a battle between his forces and those of the English took place on a moor about a mile and a half north of the village, in which the latter were defeated with great loss. In this conflict, both the villages of Ancrum were burnt to the ground; the village of Nether Ancrum was soon afterwards rebuilt, but of the other nothing remains but the ruins of one or two dilapidated houses.

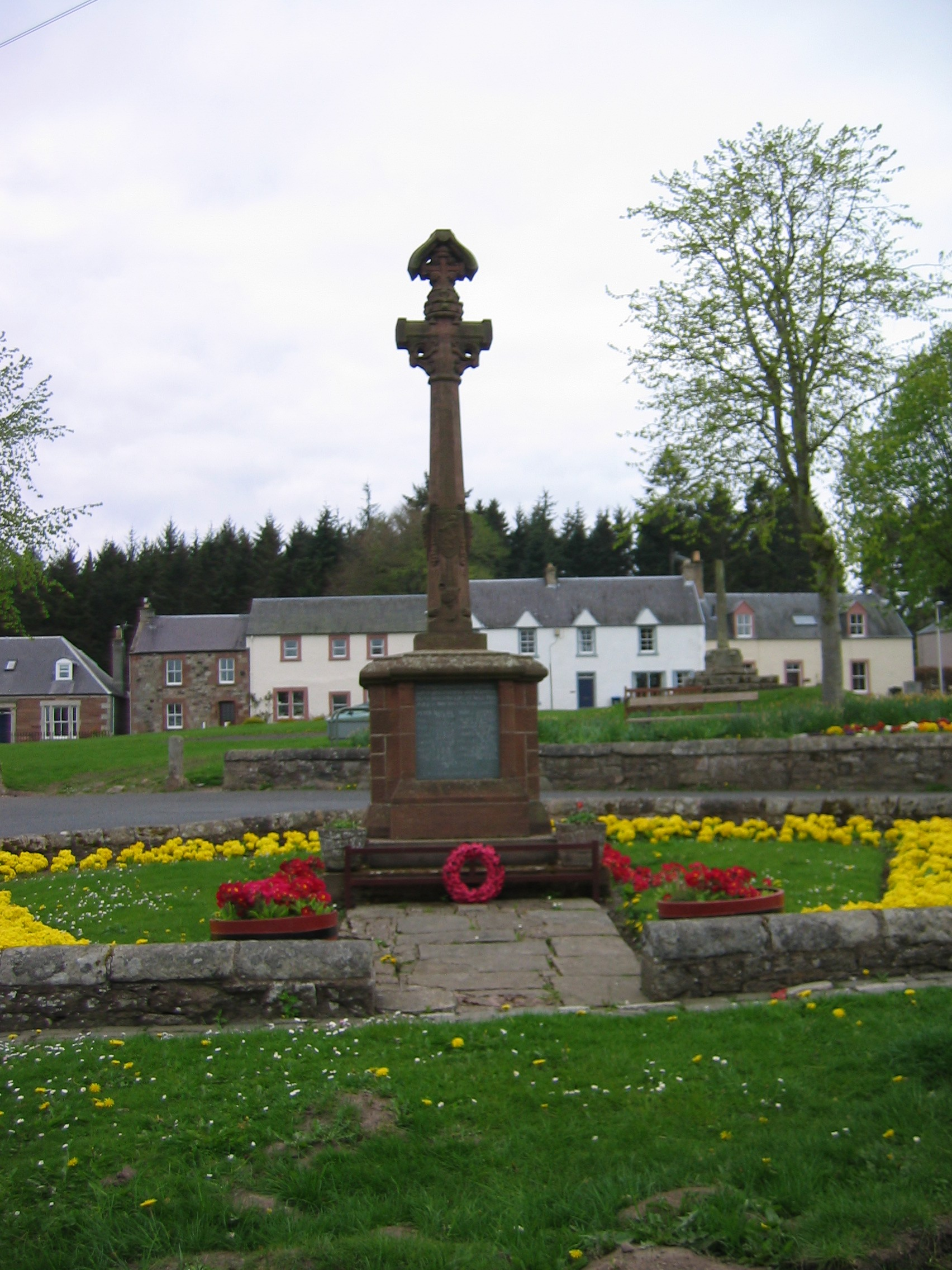
War Memorial, Ancrum

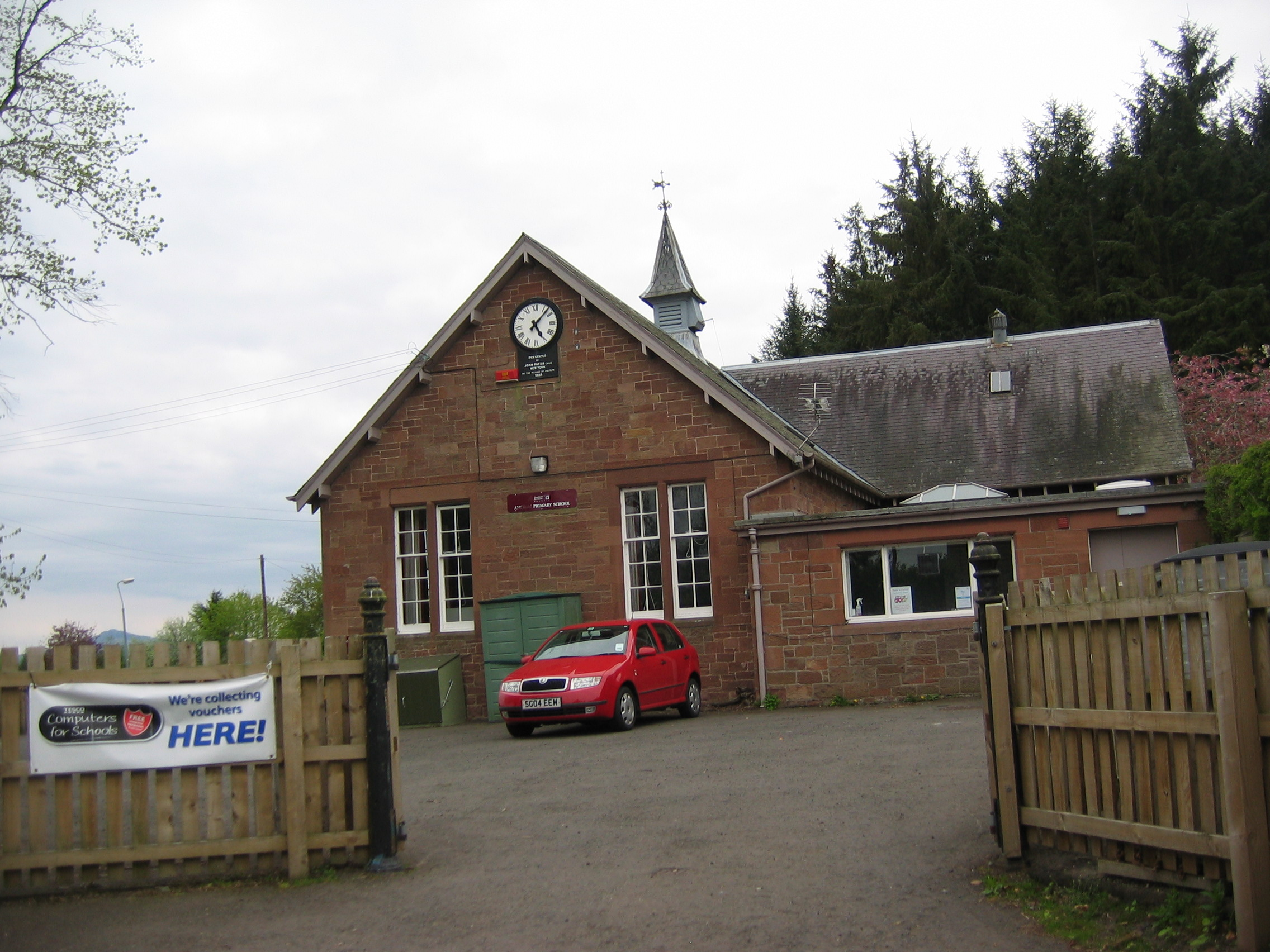
Ancrum Primary School

== Etymology ==
William J. Watson derived Ancrum from the river-name Alne + Cumbric crwm or Gaelic crom, meaning 'bend of the river Alne'.

== History ==
In the 13th century the Bishop of Glasgow William de Bondington had a residence here but the location is still being investigated.

Much of the history of the area has been written about by Alexander Jeffrey in his paper to the Berwickshire Naturalists' Club. There is also wider background information in his 4 volume work History and antiquities of Roxburghshire and adjacent districts, from the most remote period to the present time. This latter work also has a section on Ancrum.

Two local landmarks which are visible from certain areas around the village are the Waterloo Monument and the Timpendean Tower.

Ancrum sits in a loop in the Ale Water which is where the name derives from (crooked land on the Ale). The Ale joins the River Teviot just to the south which in turn then flows past Monteviot House.

Walter Kerr, laird of Cessford, seized the House of Ancrum in January 1544 which belonged to the Earl of Bothwell. Regent Arran sent a force against him.

The area just north of the village was the site of the Battle of Ancrum Moor in 1545 when the village was substantially destroyed. Nether Ancrum became a burgh of barony in 1639.

== Notable people ==
- William de Bondington, chancellor of Scotland
- Robert Bennet of Chesters, prisoner on the Bass Rock.
- Archibald Elliot (1760–1823), architect.
- John Livingston (1603–1672), a leading Covenanter, was minister in Ancrum from 1648 to 1662 when he was exiled to Rotterdam. His house in Ancrum still bears a mark "The Manse of John Livingston".
- Robert Livingston the Elder, (1654–1728), born in Ancrum, was the secretary for Indian affairs of the New York Province and the first lord of Livingston Manor.
- William Rutherford, physiologist
- John Veitch (1752–1839), the founder of the Veitch Nurseries business, was born in Ancrum.

== See also ==
- Ancrum Old Parish Church
- Earl of Ancram
- Michael Ancram
- Ancram, New York, named after Ancrum, using an older spelling.
- Ankrum
- List of places in the Scottish Borders
- List of places in Scotland
