= Ancrum (surname) =

Ancrum is a surname. Notable people with the surname include:

- David Ancrum (born 1958), American retired professional and college basketball player
- K. Ancrum (born 1991), American YA novelist
- Marion Ancrum (fl. 1885–1919), Scottish watercolour artist
- William Ancrum (c. 1722 – 1808), American merchant and indigo planter
- William Alexander Ancrum (1881–1963), American Navy officer

== See also ==
- Ancrum, a village in the Borders area of Scotland
- Ancrum House, a 1920s mansion (demolished in 1963), famous for its formal gardens, in New York state
- Earl of Ancrum, a subsidiary title of the Marquess of Lothian in the Peerage of Scotland
