= William Eure =

English aristocrat and political intriguer

Sir William Eure of Bradley was an English aristocrat and political intriguer.

== Career ==
He was a son of William Eure, 2nd Baron Eure and Margaret Dymoke, and uncle of William Eure, 4th Baron Eure, two years his junior, with whom he must not be confused..

With other members of family, he visited and harassed Thomas Posthumus Hoby and his wife at Hackness, near Scarborough, leading to well-documented litigation and counter-claims. The Eure family were traditional and Catholic recusant landowners in the area and Hoby was a relative newcomer and Puritan.

He was employed at the Scottish border by Peregrine Bertie, 13th Baron Willoughby de Eresby.

In November 1600 William Eure came into Scotland with his servant Clement Armorer. Sir Robert Ker brought him to meet King James VI at the house of Sir George Home at Spott.

Robert Carey reported this suspicious meeting, held "in the dead time of night", to Sir Robert Cecil. Eure denied all at first, then confessed to having "long conference" with James VI at Spott. Cecil was especially disappointed by Eure's denial which multiplied suspicions, although he thought the matter had beginnings only in some "very venial" cause. William Eure was imprisoned in the Tower of London for this visit, suspected of treasonous dealings.

His older brother, Ralph Eure, 3rd Baron Eure, was concerned by his arrest and potential harm to his family. Scottish diplomats made representations on William Eure's behalf and also to clarify that James VI had not made any faults. Queen Elizabeth's statement of 11 May 1601 stressed that Eure's was his denial to superior officers at Berwick that he had met the Scottish king.

William Eure was one of small number of English gentry figures whose visits to Scotland before the Union of the Crowns caused alarm to the English diplomatic community and border officials, another was Edmund Ashfield.
