= Thomas Posthumous Hoby =

English politician 1566–1640

Sir Thomas Posthumus Hoby (October 1566 – 30 December 1640), also spelt Hobie, Hobbie and Hobby, Posthumous and Postumus, was an English gentleman and politician who sat in the House of Commons at various times between 1589 and 1629. A Puritan, he has been claimed as the inspiration for Shakespeare's character Malvolio in Twelfth Night.

== Life ==
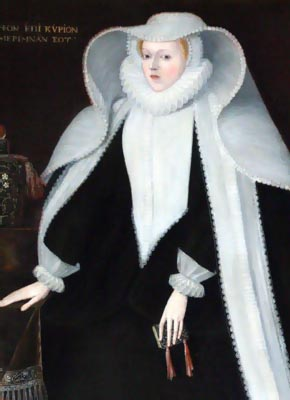
Portrait of Hoby's mother Elizabeth Hoby, at Bisham Abbey

Hoby was the younger son of Sir Thomas Hoby (1530–1566), the English Ambassador to France in 1557, by his wife, Elizabeth Cooke. Elizabeth was one of the daughters of the humanist Sir Anthony Cooke (1504–1576). Hoby was born after his father's death, which led to his gaining the additional name Posthumus. His sisters Elizabeth and Anne died within a few days of each other in February 1571. His elder brother was the diplomat and scholar Sir Edward Hoby (1560–1617). Hoby was also a nephew of Sir Philip Hoby, Master-General of the Ordnance and an English ambassador to the Holy Roman Empire.

Hoby was a very small boy and grew up to be nicknamed "the little knight" for his slightness and short stature. He was educated at Eton and at Trinity College, Oxford, matriculating in 1574 at the age of eight.

Also in 1574, some years after his father's death, Hoby's mother married John, Lord Russell, the eldest surviving son of the Earl of Bedford, and with him had three further children, Elizabeth, Anne and Francis. She was the sister-in-law of William Cecil, 1st Baron Burghley, Queen Elizabeth's Secretary of State, and Hoby was himself a first cousin of Robert Cecil, 1st Earl of Salisbury, who succeeded his father as the Queen's principal minister. As his mother pursued favours for herself and her friends, Hoby became a protégé of Burghley. Among his many other first cousins were the philosopher and statesman Francis Bacon and the spy Anthony Bacon.

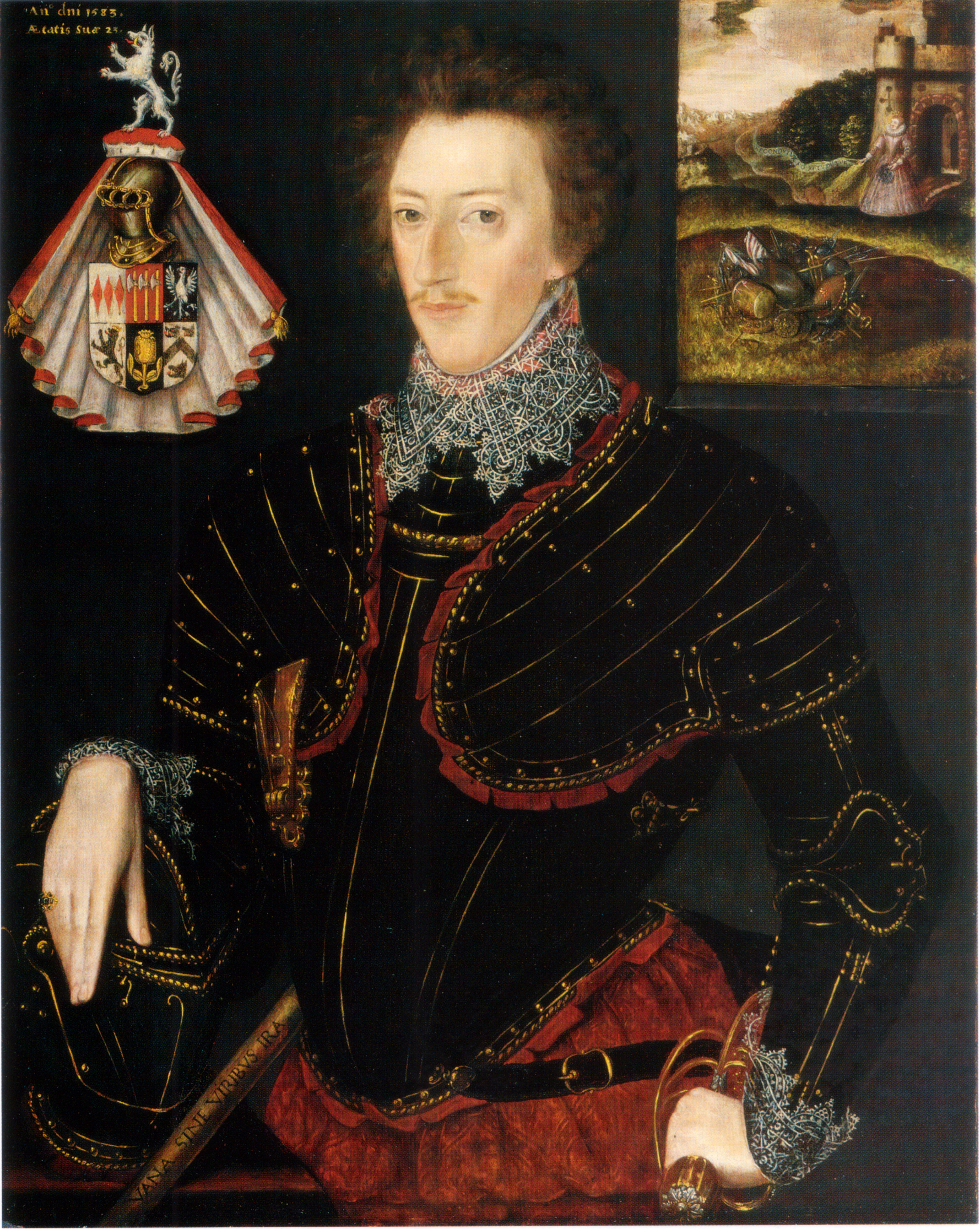
Hoby's brother Edward in 1583

In 1589 Hoby was elected Member of Parliament for Appleby. He was re-elected MP for Appleby in 1593. In 1595, Hoby married Margaret Sidney (1571–1633), daughter and heiress of Arthur Dakins, a landed gentleman of Linton, already the widow of two men, of Walter Devereux, a younger brother of the Earl of Essex, and of Thomas Sidney, a brother of the poet Philip Sidney. Hoby had been an unsuccessful suitor four years earlier, after Margaret had lost her first husband. They set up home at Hackness, Yorkshire, but had no children. Margaret Hoby is notable as a diarist.

In 1597 Hoby was elected MP for Yorkshire and Scarborough, but was declared ineligible at Yorkshire. He was elected MP for Scarborough again in 1604. In 1614 he was elected MP for Ripon and was re-elected MP for Ripon in 1621, 1624, 1625, 1626 and 1628. He was Custos Rotulorum of the North Riding of Yorkshire from 1621 to 1626.

A Puritan, in 1600 Hoby took legal action against William Eure, 4th Baron Eure (1579–1646) and several of his other neighbours, alleging that they had entered his house, taken drink, played cards, ridiculed Puritanism, and threatened to ravish his wife. In 1609 he alleged in the Star Chamber that Sir Richard Cholmley had twice spoken contemptuously to him in the hope of provoking a duel. One historian of the period has described Hoby as "that most overbearing, touchy, and resentful of Yorkshire magistrates". It has been suggested that the character of Malvolio in William Shakespeare's Twelfth Night is based on Hoby and that his legal action of 1600 inspired Scene III of Act 2 of Twelfth Night, in which Malvolio is disturbed by drunken merry-making.

As a magistrate, Hoby has been described as "exceptionally conscientious".

On his mother's death in 1609 Hoby inherited from her "all my pastures of the manor of Gyfford in Gloucestershire", and in 1617 he inherited the estates of his brother, Sir Edward.

== Death and memorials ==
Hoby died aged 74 on 30 December 1640 and was entombed with the remains of his wife in the Hackness parish church. By a will dated 28 March 1640, he left his manor of Hackness to John Sydenham of Brympton in Somerset, the son of his first cousin Alice Hoby, daughter of Sir William Hoby of Hayles, who was Hoby's uncle. He made further bequests to other members of the Sydenham family, and he also left each of his servants three years' wages. A memorial to him was erected in the church at Hackness in 1682 by Sir John Posthumous Sydenham (1643–1696), the son of Hoby's principal heir and a knight of the shire for Somerset. There is an even more impressive memorial to him in All Saints' Church, Bisham, where a painted statue of Hoby is among a family group on his mother's monument in the Hoby chapel.

Although Hoby had no children, his brother Edward's natural son Peregrine Hoby (1602–1679) was the father of Sir Edward Hoby, 1st Baronet (1634–1675), whose baronetcy continued until the fifth Baronet died in 1766.

== Notes ==
Parliament of England
Preceded by Laurence Lister	Member of Parliament for Appleby; 1589–1593; With: Ralph Bowes 1589; Cuthbert Reynolds 1593	Succeeded by James Colbrand; John Lyly
Preceded by Edward Gate; Roger Dalton	Member of Parliament for Scarborough; 1597; With: Walter Pye	Succeeded by Edward Stanhope; William Eure
Preceded by Edward Stanhope; William Eure	Member of Parliament for Scarborough; 1604–1611; With: Francis Eure; William Conyers	Succeeded by Edward Smith; William Conyers
Preceded by Sir John Mallory; Sir John Bennet	Member of Parliament for Ripon; 1614–1629; With: William Mallory 1614–1625; Thomas Best 1626; William Mallory 1628–1629	Parliament suspended until 1640
