= William Armine =

William Armine or Armyn may refer to:

- Sir William Armine, 1st Baronet (1593–1651), English politician
- Sir William Armine, 2nd Baronet (1622–1658), English politician
- William Armyn (1561–1622), English politician
