= William Eure, 2nd Baron Eure =

English nobleman in 16th century

William Eure
- 2nd Baron Eure
- Arms of the Eures of Witton
- Born: 10 May 1529
- Died: 12 September 1594 (aged 65)
- Noble family: Eure
- Spouse: Margaret Dymoke
- Father: Ralph Eure
- Mother: Margery Bowes

William Eure, 2nd Baron Eure (10 May 1529 – 12 September 1594) was a Tudor-era English nobleman, soldier, and official in the Scottish Marches.

== Early life ==
William Eure was the son of Ralph Eure, eldest son of William Eure who had been created Baron Eure in 1544, and Margery Bowes, daughter of Ralph Bowes of Streatlam Castle. His father died at the Battle of Ancrum Moor in 1545, leaving William as the heir to his grandfather's peerage. He was appointed Vice-Admiral of the coast of County Durham and Vice-Admiral of Yorkshire by Lord High Admiral Clinton in 1563.

== The Scottish Marches ==
Like his father and grandfather before him, Eure spent much of his life in the borderlands of Scotland and England. Sometime before 1557, he was appointed, jointly with Thomas Wharton, Captain of Berwick Castle, and he served under the Earl of Sussex in his 1570 invasion of Scotland. He was later dispatched with the Earl of Rutland to negotiate a peace treaty with Scotland in 1587.

== Personal life ==
Eure had been contracted, at age 11, to marry Mary Darcy, daughter of the Baron Darcy de Darcy. (His prospective wife-to-be was age 4 at the time.) At some point after 1544, he repudiated this marriage contract and instead married Margaret Dymoke, daughter of Edward Dymoke of Scrivelsby, Champion of England. They had five sons and six daughters, including:

- Ralph Eure, 3rd Baron Eure (1558–1593/4), who married Mary Dawnay, eldest daughter of Sir John Dawnay of Sessay. After her death, he married Elizabeth Carey (widow of George Carey, 2nd Baron Hunsdon.
- Francis Eure (c. 1564–1621), MP for Scarborough, who married Elizabeth Lennard (sister of Sampson Lennard, MP) and ancestor of the 7th and 8th Barons.
- William Eure (1585/6–1628/9), also MP for Scarborough, who married Catherine Bowes, de jure suo jure Baroness Scrope of Bolton, only child of Sir William Bowes of Streatlam Castle and, his first wife, Mary Scrope (only child by his first wife of Henry Scrope, 9th Baron Scrope of Bolton).
- Charles Eure, who died young.
- Charles Eure (d. after 1598), who married Elizabeth Ingham, daughter of Sir Thomas Ingham, of Goodneston.
- Anne Eure, who married Sir John Mallory, of Studley Royal.
- Meriol Eure, who married Sir Richard Goodricke of Ribston.
- Martha Eure, who married William Armyn.
- Mary Eure
- Margaret Eure
- Elizabeth Eure

Margaret Eure predeceased her husband, dying in 1591, and was buried on 15 September 1591 at Ingleby, Lincolnshire. Lord Eure died on 12 September 1594 and was buried at Ingleby the next day. He was succeeded in his peerage by his eldest son, Ralph (father of William Eure, 4th Baron Eure).

Peerage of England
Preceded by William Eure	Baron Eure; 1545–1594	Succeeded by Ralph Eure
