= William Mallory =

English politician (died 1646)

William Mallory (died 1646) of Studley Royal, Yorkshire was an English politician who sat in the House of Commons variously between 1614 and 1642. He supported the Royalist side in the English Civil War. His father, John Mallory (died 1619), was also an MP of Ripon.

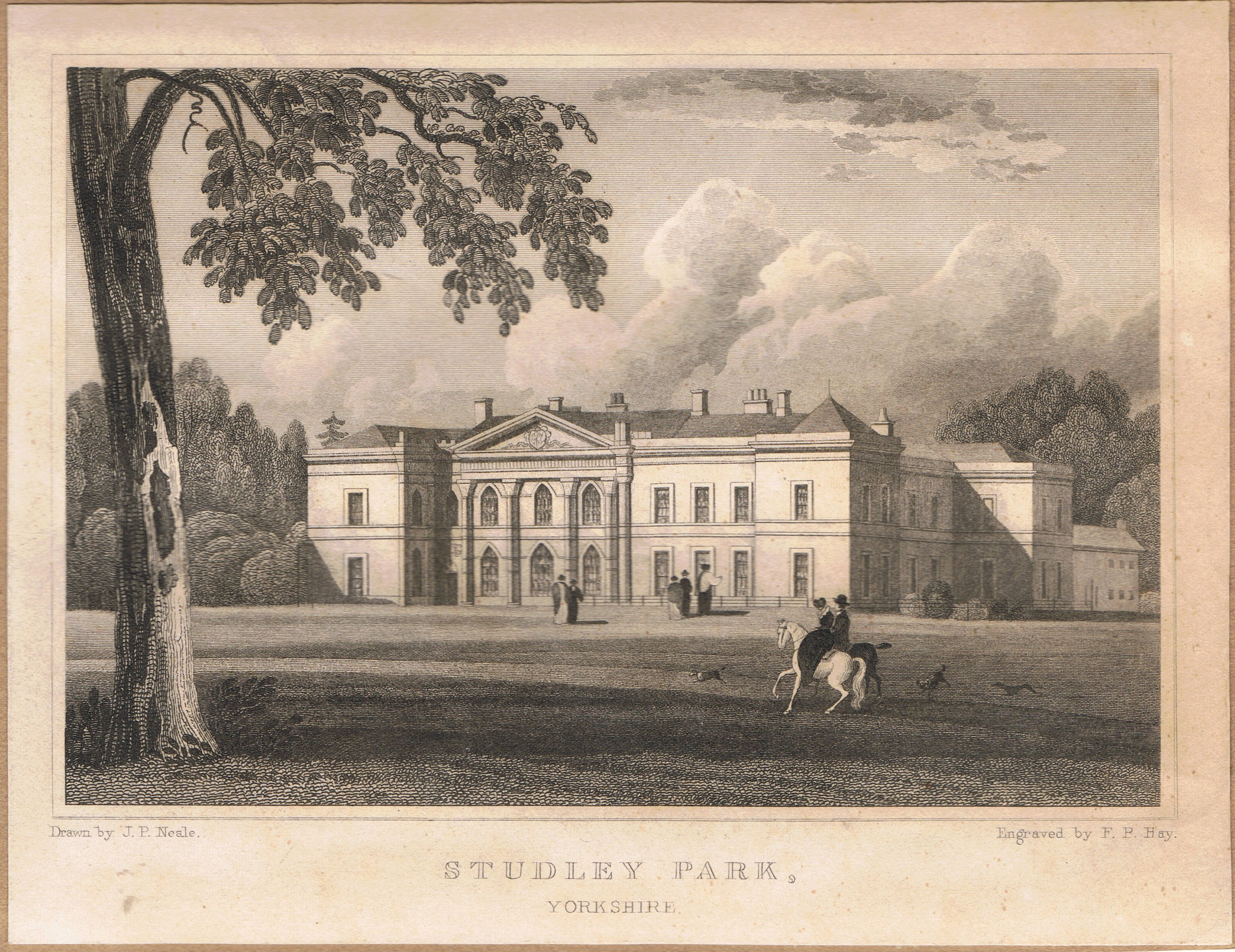
Studley Royal, Yorkshire, engraved by F. P. Hay after a drawing by J.P. Neale, c1820.

Mallory was elected Member of Parliament for Ripon in 1614 and re-elected in 1621 1624 and 1625. He was then re-elected MP for Ripon in 1628 and sat until 1629 when King Charles decided to rule without parliament for eleven years.

In April 1640, Mallory was re-elected MP for Ripon in the Short Parliament and again in November 1640 for the Long Parliament. He was disabled from sitting in parliament on 16 September 1642 for supporting the King.

Mallory died in 1646.

Mallory married Dorothy Bellingham, daughter of Sir James Bellingham of Levens, Westmorland. Their son John Mallory (1610–1655) was also MP for Ripon.

Parliament of England
Preceded by Sir John Mallory; Sir John Bennet	Member of Parliament for Ripon; 1614–1625; With: Sir Thomas Posthumus Hoby	Succeeded by Thomas Best; Sir Thomas Posthumus Hoby
Preceded by Thomas Best; Sir Thomas Posthumus Hoby	Member of Parliament for Ripon; 1628–1629; With: Sir Thomas Posthumus Hoby	Parliament suspended until 1640
Parliament suspended since 1629	Member of Parliament for Ripon; 1640; With: Sir Paul Neille 1640	Succeeded by Sir Charles Egerton; Miles Moody
