= Ancrum Old Parish Church =

- Ancrum Parish Church
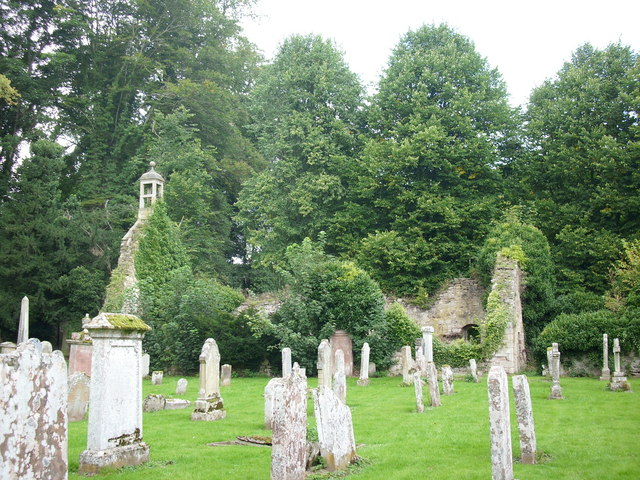
- Ruins of Old Ancrum Kirk
- Ancrum Old Parish Church
- 55°30′59″N 2°36′03″W
- Location: Ancrum
- Country: Scotland
- Denomination: Church of Scotland

History
- Status: Ruins
- Founded: 1136
- Founder: David I of Scotland

Architecture
- Architectural type: Church
- Years built: 1762
- Closed: 1890

Listed Building – Category B
- Designated: 16 March 1971
- Reference no.: LB4239

Ancrum Old Parish Church is situated just over half a mile north west of the village of Ancrum in the Scottish Borders area of Scotland, on the B4600 road leading off the A68. The village of Ancrum is four miles north west of Jedburgh. The churchyard contains the burial ground for the local area. The old church is situated at grid reference NT621248, and the remains are protected as a Category B listed building.

== History ==
The origins of the church are from 1136 when a monastic settlement was established by David I of Scotland. That foundation was part of the Archdeanery of Teviotdale in the See of Glasgow. This situation existed until the Reformation in 1560 when the church was transformed, according to the new faith, to Ancrum Parish Church.

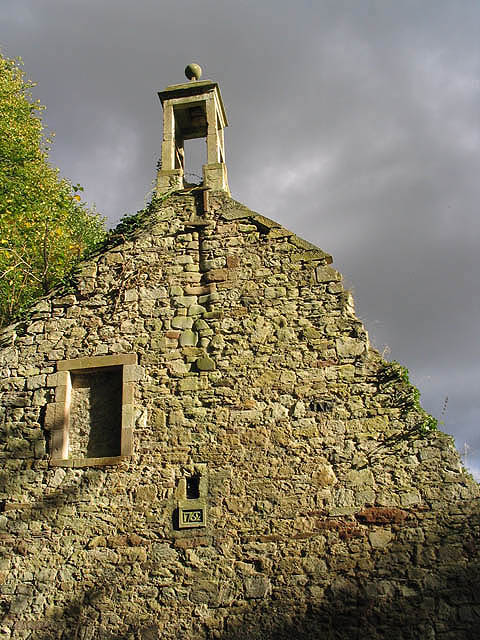
West gable of Old Ancrum Kirk

The old buildings were replaced in 1762 when a new church was built, incorporating a fragmented aisle from the old church. In 1832, the church was extensively repaired. The church, in later years, was alternatively known as "The Livingston Church" in memory of the most notable of all the clerics at Ancrum, the Rev. John Livingston (1603–1672). Livingston was part of the commission sent to Breda in the Netherlands in 1660 to meet King Charles II of England and Scotland, to make arrangements for his homecoming to receive the Crown of Scotland. In 1684, the parish of Longnewton was annexed to the parish at Ancrum. In 1890, the old church was abandoned when the new parish church (by Hardy & Wight) was opened in the village of Ancrum. The new church contains a Dutch bell of 1618.

== List of ministers after the Reformation ==
Hew Scott's fuller list:
partial list:

- 1560 James Thornton - Parson and Vicar
- 1569 William Johnston
- 1578 Hector Douglas - Parson and Vicar
- 1582 George Johnston
- 1616 James Scott
- 1622 William Bennet
- 1648 John Livingston
- 1704 John Cranstoun

== Other churches ==
There was a Free Church in Ancrum known as the John Knox Free Church and it was open for worship from 1859 until 1933.

== Today ==
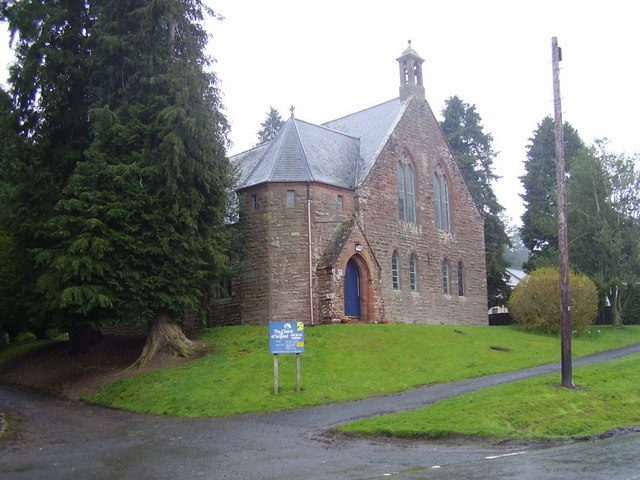
'New'Ancrum Kirk

The Parish of Ancrum is no longer a separate parish and it is now part of the United Parish of Ale and Teviot, incorporating Ancrum, Lilliesleaf, Crailing and Eckford. The minister is the Reverend Frank Campbell.

== Meaning of name ==
The meaning of the name Ancrum is, from the Gaelic 'alne cromb' - 'the bend in the Ale' (local river)

== See also ==
- Ancrum
- Battle of Ancrum Moor
- List of places in the Scottish Borders
- List of places in East Lothian
- List of places in Midlothian
- List of places in West Lothian

== External links (further reading) ==
- The Man from Ancrum
- more photos from Geograph
