= Thomas Best (MP for Ripon) =

English politician

Thomas Best (30 July 1589 – c. 1649), of Middleton Quernhow, near Ripon, Yorkshire and Fleet Street, London, was an English politician.

He was a member (MP) of the parliament of England for Ripon in 1626.

Parliament of England
Preceded by Sir Thomas Posthumous Hoby; William Mallory	Member of Parliament for Ripon; 1626; With: Sir Thomas Posthumous Hoby	Succeeded by Sir Thomas Posthumous Hoby; William Mallory
