= Baron Eure =

Extinct barony in the Peerage of England

Baron Eure was a title in the Peerage of England. It was granted to Sir William Eure by Henry VIII in 1544. The Baron was thereafter called Lord Eure. The title became extinct with the death of Ralph Eure in 1690. The family name is also spelt Evres, Ewer, and Evers.

Sir William Eure was created Lord Eure, by letters patent, on 24 February 1544 during the reign of Henry VIII. He was succeeded by his grandson, William, 2nd Lord Eure (son of Ralph, heir of the 1st Baron, who was killed at the battle of Ancrum Moor), who died 1570 during the reign of Elizabeth I, leaving his son, Ralph, 3rd Lord Eure, father of William, 4th Lord Eure, who was succeeded by his grandson, William, 5th Lord Eure (son of Ralph), who was succeeded by his uncle, William, 6th Lord Eure, slain at the battle of Marston-Moor, 1645, leaving only daughters. The honour then devolved on George, great-grandson of the 2nd Peer (viz. son of Horace, son of Sir Francis, second son of the said Peer.) This George thus becoming 7th Lord Eure, died unmarried in 1672. He was succeeded by his brother, Ralph, 8th Lord Eure; on whose death without issue, the honour became extinct.

Arthur Collins in 1812 briefly described the baronage with eight barons, as did John Preston Neale in 1823 and John Burke in 1831, however The Gentleman's Magazine, for August 1817, includes two not three Williams between Ralph Eure and George Eure which makes George the 6th Baron Eure not the 7th as in Collins, and some other sources also state that George and Ralf (the last Baron Eure), were the 6th and 7th barons.

== Lord Eure ==
- William Eure, 1st Baron Eure (c. 1483–1548) Warden of the Eastern March, and Governor of Berwick upon Tweed (succeeded by his grandson)
- William Eure, 2nd Baron Eure (10 May 1529 – 12 September 1594), Warden of the Middle March and Governor of Berwick upon Tweed (succeeded by his son)
- Ralph Eure, 3rd Baron Eure (24 September 1558 – 1 Apr 1617]) (succeeded by his son)
- William Eure, 4th Baron Eure (c. 1579–1646) (succeeded by his grandson)
- William Eure, 5th Baron Eure (d. 1652) (succeeded by his second cousin once removed)
- William Eure, 6th Baron Eure (d. 1672) (succeeded by his brother)
- George Eure, 7th Baron Eure (d. 1672)
- Ralph Eure, 8th Baron Eure (–1690)

== See also ==
- Ralph Euer
