= Listed buildings in Middleton Quernhow =

Middleton Quernhow is a civil parish in the county of North Yorkshire, England. It contains four listed buildings that are recorded in the National Heritage List for England. All the listed buildings are designated at Grade II, the lowest of the three grades, which is applied to "buildings of national importance and special interest". The parish contains the village of Middleton Quernhow and the surrounding area. All the listed buildings are in the village, and consist of houses, one a ruin, and associated structures.

== Buildings ==
Name and location	Photograph	Date	Notes
The Old Hall; 54.19949°N 1.48950°W		Early 17th century	The house, now a ruin, is in sandstone, and the southeast corner remains, consisting of a gable wall. This contains two mullioned and transomed windows, each with a pulvinated frieze and a pediment, triangular in the lower floor and broken segmental above. On the left is a shaped kneeler, and on the left return is a massive five-stage chimney stack.
Wall and gate piers, The Old Hall; 54.19958°N 1.48919°W		17th century	The wall is in red brick with stone coping, and is about 1.5 metres (4 ft 11 in) high. The gate piers are square in section, in red brick, and about 2 metres (6 ft 7 in) high. Each pier has a stone band, an entablature and a ball finial.
North Farmhouse; 54.20084°N 1.48926°W	—	Mid 18th century	The farmhouse is in sandstone with two courses of brick under the eaves, and it has a pantile roof with a stone ridge. There are two storeys, three bays and a rear oushut. On the front are a doorway and three-light horizontally-sliding sash windows.
The Old House; 54.19901°N 1.48905°W	—	Mid 18th century	The house is in roughcast brick, and has a pantile and lead roof with stone copings. There are two storeys, a main block of three bays, and a two-bay extension to the left. On the front is a porch containing a doorway with a rectangular fanlight. The windows are sash windows, those in the main block in architraves. The porch and extension are embattled.
