= Ankrum =

Ankrum is a surname. It is an American version of the Scottish surname Ancrum. Notable people with the surname include:

- Aubrey Ankrum (born 1972), American screenwriter, animator, and graphic artist
- Joan Wheeler Ankrum (1913–2001), American actress
- Morris Ankrum (1896–1964), American actor
- Tyler Ankrum (born 2001), American stock car racing driver
