= Paul Neile =

English astronomer and politician

Sir Paul Neile FRS (1613 – February 1686) was an English astronomer and politician who sat in the House of Commons in 1640 and from 1673 to 1677.

Neile was born at Westminster, the son of Richard Neile, later Archbishop of York. He was admitted at Pembroke College, Cambridge on 20 May 1627 aged 14 and was awarded BA in 1631. He was one of the ushers of the Privy Chamber to King Charles I, and was knighted on 27 May 1633 when he was of Hutton Bonville York.

In April 1640, Neile was elected Member of Parliament for Ripon in the Short Parliament. During the interregnum he was living at White Waltham, Berkshire, where he studied astronomy and built telescopes. Sir Christopher Wren was using Neile's telescope at White Waltham in 1655 and in 1658 Neile gave a 35-foot telescope to Gresham College. He was one of the twelve founder members of the Royal Society and in 1661 the Society "desired him to continue his employment of the artificer for making glasses for perspectives".

In 1673 Neile was elected MP for Newark together with his business partner Henry Savile. However his election was unpopular and contested and he was unable to take his seat properly in the next four years. The election was eventually declared void on 21 Mar 1677.

Neile died at the age of 73.

Neile married Elizabeth Clarke, daughter of Gabriel Clarke, D.D., Archdeacon of Durham. Their son William Neile was a mathematician and astronomer.

Parliament of England
Vacant Parliament suspended since 1629	Member of Parliament for Ripon; 1640 (April); With: William Mallory	Succeeded by William Mallory; John Mallory
New constituency	Member of Parliament for Newark; 1673–1677; With: Henry Savile	Succeeded by Henry Savile; Sir Richard Rothwell
