= Brian Layton =

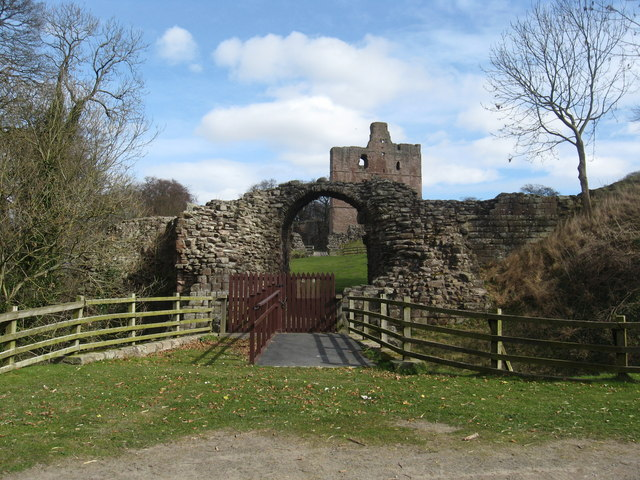
Brian Layton was Captain of Norham Castle on the border between England and Scotland

Sir Brian Layton, also spelled Laiton, Leyton, or Leighton, (died 27 February 1545) was an English soldier and Captain of Norham Castle.

== Border service ==
As Captain of Norham, Layton watched the border between Scotland and England. In December 1539, his men tracked the English priest Dr Hilliard, who was fleeing into Scotland. Layton's men arrested Hilliard's servant, but Hilliard crossed the Tweed near Coldstream. Layton's spies in Scotland discovered that Hilliard was received by the Prioress of Coldstream and hoped to meet David Beaton. In April 1540, Layton saw fires lit in Scottish villages on the night of Trinity Sunday which celebrated the birth of the son of Mary of Guise and James V of Scotland. On the same day, he questioned a Scottish man about the secret plans of James V for a sea voyage.

In October 1542, Layton was troubled by rumours of a plot by members of his own garrison at Norham to hand the castle over to the Scots. He questioned suspected soldiers, and sent reports to Cuthbert Tunstall, Bishop of Durham, which give useful historical information about the castle and the routine of the garrison.

Layton rode with the force of border horseman to the burning of Edinburgh (1544). He and Ralph Eure commanded an English invasion of Scotland during the War of the Rough Wooing in February 1545. The soldiers destroyed tombs of the Douglas family at Melrose Abbey. Layton and Eure were both killed at the Battle of Ancrum Moor.
