= Calhoun Ancrum =

American intelligence officer, columnist, and minister (1915–1990)

The Reverend Calhoun Ancrum Jr.
- Born: April 28, 1915; Olongapo City, Philippines
- Died: 1 February 1990 (aged 70); Boston, Massachusetts, U.S.
- Spouse: Princess Xenia Andreevna of Russia
- Relatives: William Ancrum (4th great-uncle) Princess Xenia Andreevna Romanoff (wife); John C. Calhoun (3rd great uncle) William Alexander Ancrum (uncle)
- Military career
- Branch: United States Office of Strategic Services (OSS); U.S. Army
- Service years: 1943–1945
- Rank: First Lieutenant
- Awards: Distinguished Service Cross

Calhoun Ancrum Jr. (April 28, 1915 – February 1, 1990) was an American intelligence officer, newspaper columnist, and Episcopal minister. He served as a first lieutenant in the United States Army during World War II (as his cover), notably as a multilingual operative for the Office of Strategic Services (OSS), and was awarded the Distinguished Service Cross for extraordinary heroism.

== Biography ==
During World War II, Ancrum was commissioned a lieutenant in United States Army as cover for his distinguished service in the Office of Strategic Services, the wartime intelligence agency preceding the Central Intelligence Agency. Fluent in seven languages, Ancrum operated primarily out of England, conducting high-risk clandestine missions into Nazi-occupied territories. He frequently flew missions into Germany to deliver encrypted radio communications to resistance forces.

His exceptional bravery in the line of duty earned him the Distinguished Service Cross, the second-highest U.S. Army decoration awarded for extreme gallantry and risk of life in combat operations.

In 1945, Ancrum married Princess Xenia Andreevna (Romanoff) of Russia, the daughter of Prince Andrei Alexandrovich of Russia (24 January 1897 – 8 May 1981) and Donna Elisabetha Ruffo. She was the granddaughter of Grand Duke Alexander Mikhailovich, a grandson of Tsar Nicholas I, and the granddaughter of Grand Duchess Xenia Alexandrovna of Russia, who was the eldest daughter of Tsar Alexander III and sister to Tsar Nicholas II. She was thus a grandniece and of Tsar Nicholas II and twice descended from the tsars of Russia. They later divorced.

Following his military career, he established himself as a newspaper columnist and later devoted himself to religious service, becoming assistant rector at Boston's historic Old North Church.

Ancrum died in 1990.
