= Middleton Quernhow =

Village and civil parish in North Yorkshire, England

Coordinates: 54.200°N 1.487°W

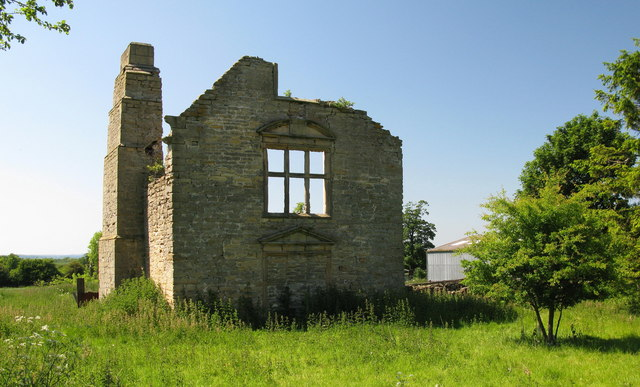
- The Old Hall at Middleton Quernhow

- Location within North Yorkshire
- Population: 60
- Civil parish: Middleton Quernhow
- Unitary authority: North Yorkshire
- Ceremonial county: North Yorkshire
- Region: Yorkshire and the Humber
- Country: England
- Sovereign state: United Kingdom
- Post town: Ripon
- Postcode district: HG4
- Police: North Yorkshire
- Fire: North Yorkshire
- Ambulance: Yorkshire

Middleton Quernhow is a settlement and civil parish in North Yorkshire, England. The parish is included in the Wathvale Ward with a population of 3,479 (at the 2011 census). North Yorkshire County Council estimated that the population of the parish was 60 in 2015. It is very near the A1(M) road and is 4 miles (7 km) north of Ripon.

Quernhow, which has also been spelled Whernhowe and Whernou means mill-hill, the first element deriving from the Old Norse kvern meaning a mill stone. How or Howe, deriving from the Old Norse word haugr meaning a hill, is a common element in Yorkshire place name. In this instance, the Quernhow in question is a small hillock on a road that was the dividing line between the parishes of Ainderby and Middleton Quernhow.

The settlement is mentioned in the Domesday Book of 1086 as being a manor of 5 carucates, once held by Tor, but by 1086 was in the possession of Count Alan. It passed through several families (de Middleton, de Scrope, best and Herbert) before the manor house was left to ruin sometime in the early 18th century. The manor house is known as The Old Hall and is now a grade II listed building but has been listed as being in poor condition and under threat and is listed on English Heritage's Buildings at Risk Register. One of the former occupants of The Old hall, Thomas Best, was a Member of Parliament for Ripon in the early 17th century.

From 1974 to 2023 it was part of the Borough of Harrogate, it is now administered by the unitary North Yorkshire Council.

The housing in the village is mostly former estate cottages tied to the manor house. The surrounding area is grassland and is in use for arable farming.

As there is no school in the village, primary school children are taken by a free bus to Pickhill Primary School on the other side of the A1(M). Secondary education for children from the area is at Thirsk School.

== See also ==
- Listed buildings in Middleton Quernhow

== Gallery ==
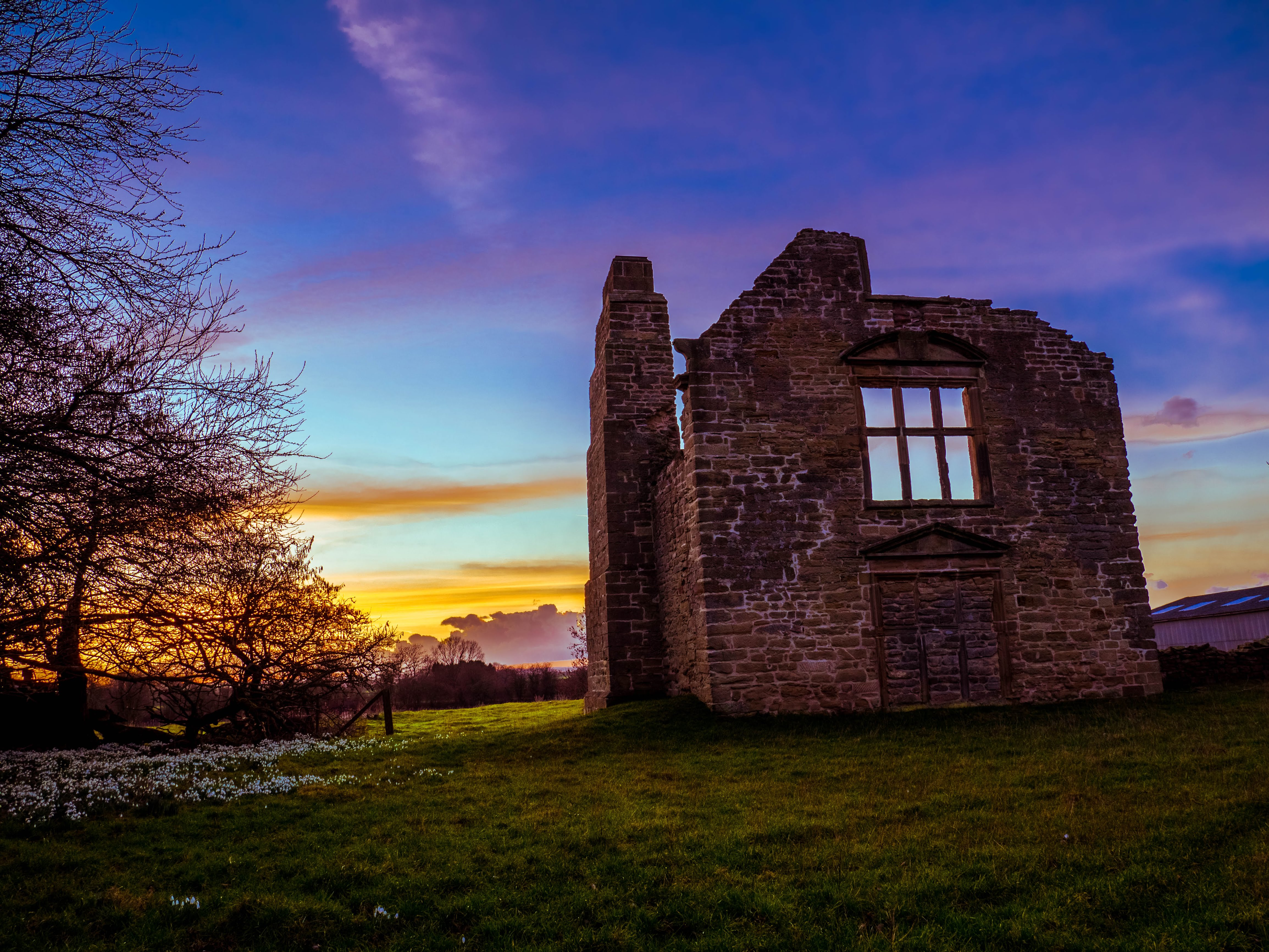
Sunset at the Old Hall, Middleton Quernhow

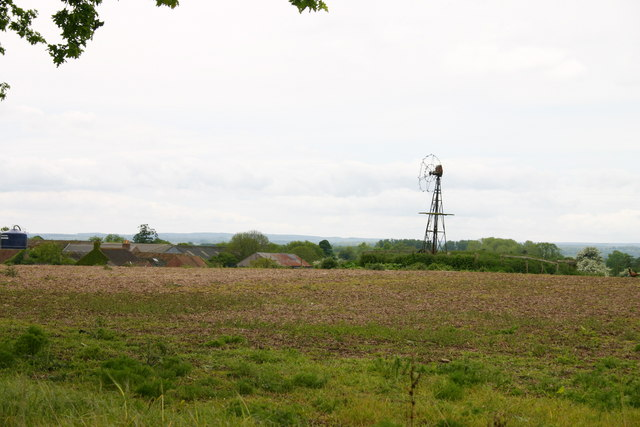
A windmill driving a waterpump near Middleton Quernhow
