= Ralph Eure (died 1545) =

Member of the Parliament of England

Sir Ralph Eure (or Evers) (died 1545) was an English military administrator and Member of Parliament.

He was the son of William Eure, 1st Baron Eure of Witton, County Durham and Elizabeth, the daughter of Sir Christopher Willoughby of Parham, Suffolk.

He was deputy constable of Scarborough Castle from 1531, being in charge during the Pilgrimage of Grace and promoted constable in 1537. He was knighted in 1536 and returned as Member of Parliament for Scarborough from 1542 to 1544.

In 1542 he was appointed a deputy warden of the Middle Marches and promoted warden from 1544 during the period of conflict between England and Scotland known as the Rough Wooing. During that time he undertook several raids into Scotland, and captured James Hamilton of Innerwick. Eure was able to recruit help from some Scottish border dwellers, known as "Assured Scots". William Lauder, a burgess of Lauder, and his son were subsequently given a remission or pardon for their treasonable supplying and assistance given to "Sir Rauff Everis" and other Englishmen.

Eure was killed in the Scottish victory at the Battle of Ancrum Moor on 27 February 1545.

Eure had married by 1529, Margery, the daughter of Sir Ralph Bowes of Streatlam, with whom he had three sons and two daughters. On his untimely death his offices passed to his father; the baronetcy eventually passed in 1548 to his son William.
