= Ralph Eure, 3rd Baron Eure =

English nobleman and politician

Ralph Eure, 3rd Baron Eure (24 September 1558 – 1 April 1617), of Ingleby and Malton, Yorkshire, was an English nobleman and politician. The surname, also given as Evers, was at that time probably pronounced "Ewry".

== Life ==
He was the son of William Eure, 2nd Baron Eure and Margaret Dymoke, daughter of Sir Edward Dymoke, the Hereditary King's Champion and Anne Taillboys.

Eure matriculated at St John's College, Cambridge in 1568, and was admitted at Gray's Inn in 1575. He was a Member of the Parliament of England for Yorkshire 1584. He succeeded to the title in 1594 (N.S.), and served on the Council of Wales and the Marches.

Eure served as Warden of the Middle March from 1586 to 1588 and again in 1595, a troubled position. He came into conflict with Thomas Scrope, 10th Baron Scrope of Bolton, Warden of the West March, siding with Thomas Carleton over the Kinmont Willie affair. In another quarrel, he allegedly tried to poison John Browne (MP for Morpeth), following an attack on Browne by his servants, and the loss of his position in 1598.

In the case of Thomas Posthumous Hoby, whose house had been made the scene of rowdy and threatening behaviour by Eure's son William and others in 1600, Eure's position as Vice-president of the Council of the North came into play. Hoby sought and received some redress through the Star Chamber. This was after Eure had suggested duelling as the manly way.

In 1602 Eure led a diplomatic mission to Bremen. With Daniel Donne and Sir John Herbert he met Danish representatives there, on commercial matters concerned with the law of the sea. He took Thomas Morton with him as chaplain, in addition to Richard Crakanthorpe. The mission ended with the death of the queen in 1603.

Eure became the President of the Council of Wales and the Marches in 1607, a position based at Ludlow Castle in Shropshire. His time as President was marked by a campaign from Sir Herbert Croft to remove the council's jurisdiction over a number of English counties. He died on 1 April 1617 aged 58, and was buried at Ludlow's St Laurence's Church, where his first wife was already buried.

== Family ==
Eure married first, by 1578, Mary, daughter of Sir John Dawnay (of Sessay, Yorkshire), who was MP for Thirsk. William Eure, 4th Baron Eure was his son by this marriage. They had at least one daughter, Barbara, who married William Ireland: their son was the Catholic martyr William Ireland. Mary died in March 1612 and was buried at Ludlow, where a tomb effigy was erected in St Laurence's Church.

He married, secondly, Elizabeth Spencer, daughter of Sir John Spencer and Katherine Kitson, and widow of George Carey, 2nd Baron Hunsdon. She survived him, dying early in 1618, and was buried with her first husband in Westminster Abbey.

== Arms ==
Coat of arms of Ralph Eure, 3rd Baron Eure

Escutcheon
Quarterly of six 1st quarterly Argent and Gules on a bend Sable three escallops Argent (Eure) 2nd Or two bars Azure between six martlets Gules (Painel) 3rd Or three bars Azure on a canton Gules a cross flory Argent 4th quarterly Or and Argent a border compony Or and Azure for (Mandeville) 5th Or a cross Sable (Aton) 6th Vert three lions rampant Argent (Warwick) overall a label of three points Azure.

Parliament of England
Preceded by Sir Thomas Gargrave; Sir Robert Stapleton	Member of Parliament for Yorkshire; 1584–1585; With: Sir William Mallory	Succeeded by Sir Henry Gates; Sir Thomas Fairfax
Political offices
Preceded by Sir William Mallory	High Sheriff of Yorkshire; 1593–1594	Succeeded by Francis Vaughan
Preceded by Sir John Forster	Custos Rotulorum of Northumberland; 1596–1598	Succeeded by Sir Robert Carey
Preceded by The Lord Zouche	Lord President of Wales; Lord Lieutenant of Wales (less Glamorgan and Monmouthshire), Herefordshire, Shropshire and Worcestershire; 1607–1617	Succeeded by The Lord Gerard
Peerage of England
Preceded by William Eure	Baron Eure; 1594–1617	Succeeded by William Eure
