= William Armyn =

English politician (1562–1622)

William Armyn (1561–1622) of Osgodby, Parts of Kesteven, Lincolnshire, was an English politician and MP.

He was a member of the parliament of England (MP) for Grantham in 1589.

He married Martha Eure, daughter of William Eure, 2nd Baron Eure. They were the parents of Sir William Armine, 1st Baronet.
