= William Alexander Ancrum =

American naval officer (1881–1963)

- William A. Ancrum, III, USN
- Born: July 8, 1881; Rossdhu Plantation, Abbeville, South Carolina, U.S.
- Died: March 11, 1963 (aged 81); Rossdhu Plantation, Pawleys Island, South Carolina, U.S.
- Burial place: Arlington National Cemetery; Washington, D.C., U.S.
- Education: United States Naval Academy
- Spouse: Cora Nesbit Carrison
- Children: 3, including William Alexander Ancrum IV, Margaret Carrison Ancrum Carleson
- Relatives: William Ancrum (3rd great-uncle) Calhoun Ancrum (nephew); Princess Xenia Andreevna Romanoff (niece) John C. Calhoun (2nd great uncle)
- Military career
- Branch: United States Navy
- Service years: 1903–1945
- Rank: Captain
- Commands: USS Warrington; USS Jarvis; USS Flusser; First Division, Torpedo Flotilla (Atlantic Fleet); USS Sigourney; Destroyer Division SIX; Destroyer Division TWENTY-SIX; USS Alden; USS Tallahassee; USS Utah; Battleship Division TWO, Scouting Fleet; USS Mercy; USS Whitney; USS Colorado; Port Director, Sixth Naval District
- Conflicts: Spanish–American War; Philippine-American War; Mexican Border War; World War I; World War II
- Awards: Navy Commendation Medal; Order of Saints Maurice and Lazarus; Spanish Campaign Medal; Philippine Campaign Medal; World War I Victory Medal; American Defense Service Medal; American Campaign Medal; World War II Victory Medal; Order of the Crown of Belgium

William Alexander Ancrum (July 8, 1881 – March 11, 1963) was a captain in the United States Navy who fought during the early 20th century in five separate wars during his career. He held numerous commands in the Navy in various capacities. He served directly with Admiral Sims and General Pershing. He was knighted by two separate European heads of state for his service.

== Early life ==
William Alexander Ancrum III, of Camden, South Carolina, was born at the home of his maternal grandparents ("Rossdhu") in Abbeville, SC, on July 8, 1881, the oldest son of Planter and Civil War Veteran William Alexander Ancrum II and Anna Susan Calhoun. His grandfather, John Alfred Calhoun, a signer of the Ordinance of Secession, was the nephew of United States Vice President John C. Calhoun. Young Ancrum was raised on both Redbank Plantation (owned by the Ancrums since the mid-18th century) and the family's residence on Fair Street that was built as a summer residence by his paternal great-grandfather, William Ancrum Jr. of Charleston in the late 1700s. The latter was inspired by the Caribbean Georgian architecture he so admired in Jamaica while returning home to Charleston from Eton College.

Of French Huguenot and Scottish descent, Ancrum came from a Charleston family that settled in Camden to better cultivate the rich swamps of the Wateree and avoid malaria. He was educated in the local Camden schools but maintained his connections to Charleston, eventually later becoming a member of the St. Cecilia Society. A bright and disciplined young man, after completing school Ancrum was one of few to successfully secure a spot at the United States Naval Academy.

== Career ==
Following his graduation from the Naval Academy in February 1903, he embarked on his career with an initial assignment to USS Wisconsin, stationed at the Bremerton, Washington, Navy Yard, bound for Chefoo, China. Subsequently, he was transferred to USS Oregon, part of the Asiatic Fleet. After completing over two years of service on USS Oregon, he transitioned to the destroyer Chauncey, tasked with patrolling the Western Philippines during the Russo-Japanese War and participating in operations against the Moros. He then joined USS Minnesota upon her commissioning on March 9, 1907, and served aboard during her world cruise alongside fifteen other battleships."

His subsequent assignments led him to the Navy Yard, Boston, Massachusetts, where he briefly served aboard the newly commissioned USS Flusser on October 28, 1909. On December 29, 1909, he assumed the role of an assistant to the Engineer Officer at the Navy Yard, Norfolk, Virginia, and also served as a member of the Court of Inquiry during that tour of duty. He undertook temporary ordnance duty on USS Kearsarge and USS Kentucky at the Philadelphia Navy Yard in October 1911, and upon detachment from the Norfolk Navy Yard on December 16, 1912, he assumed command of USS Warrington, commanding the vessel for six months.

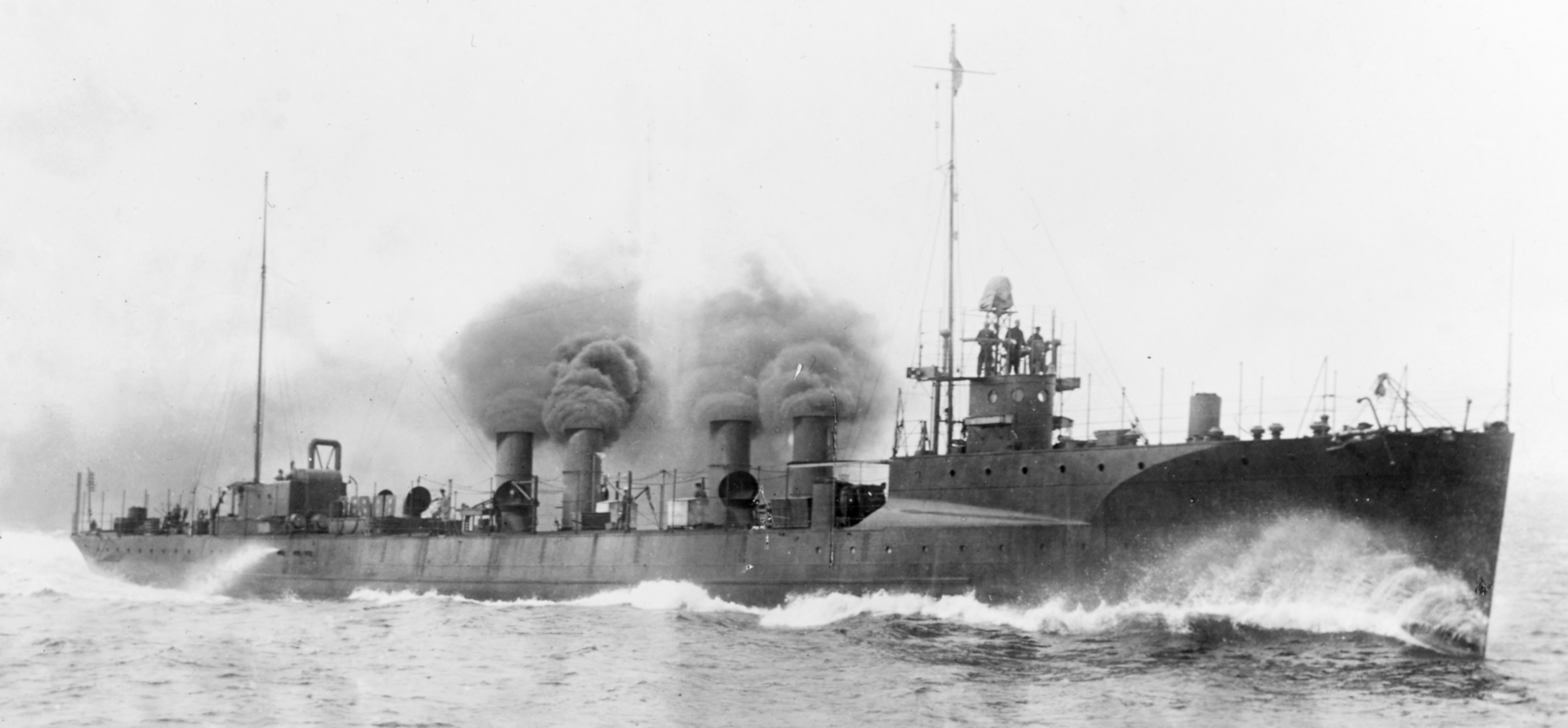

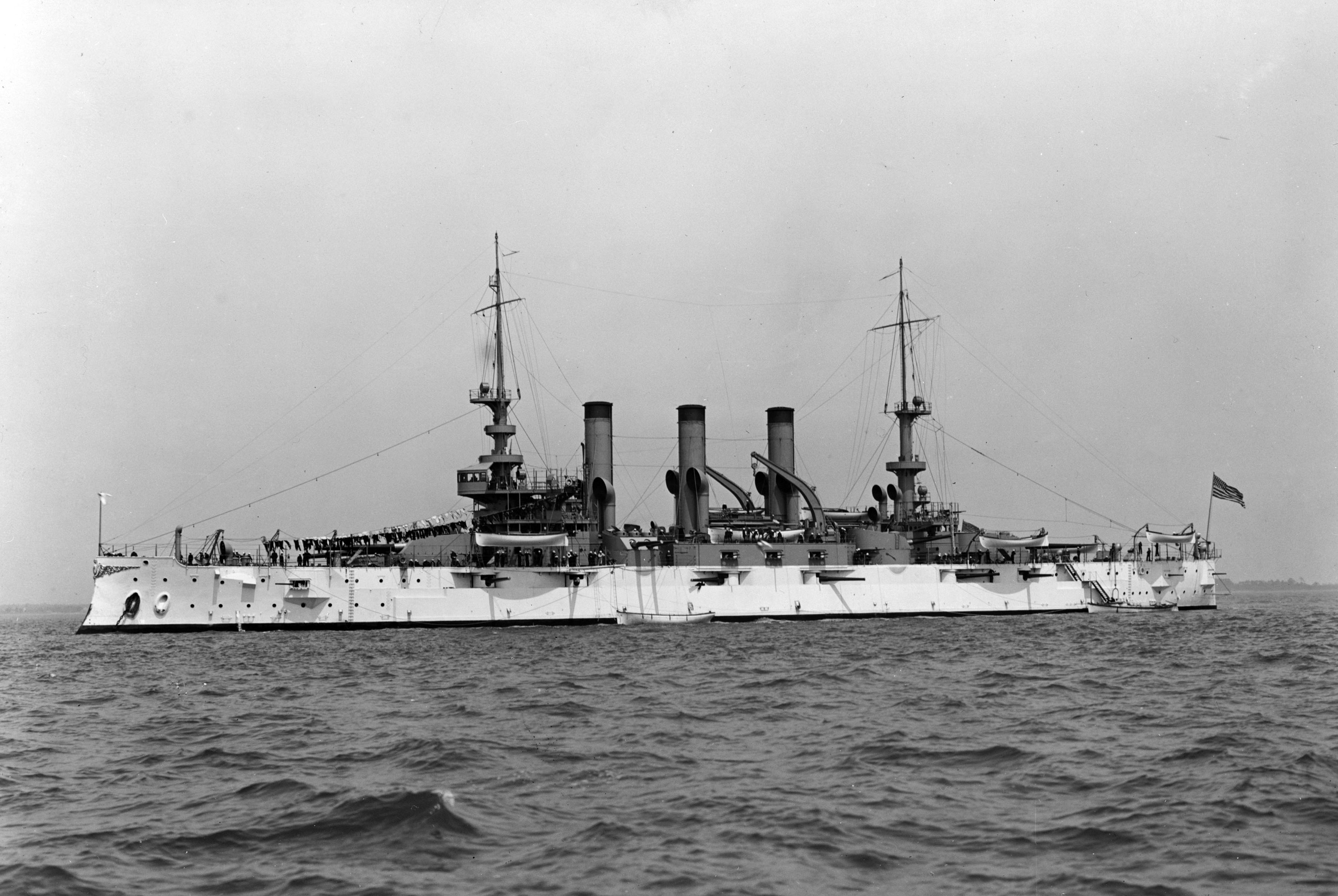

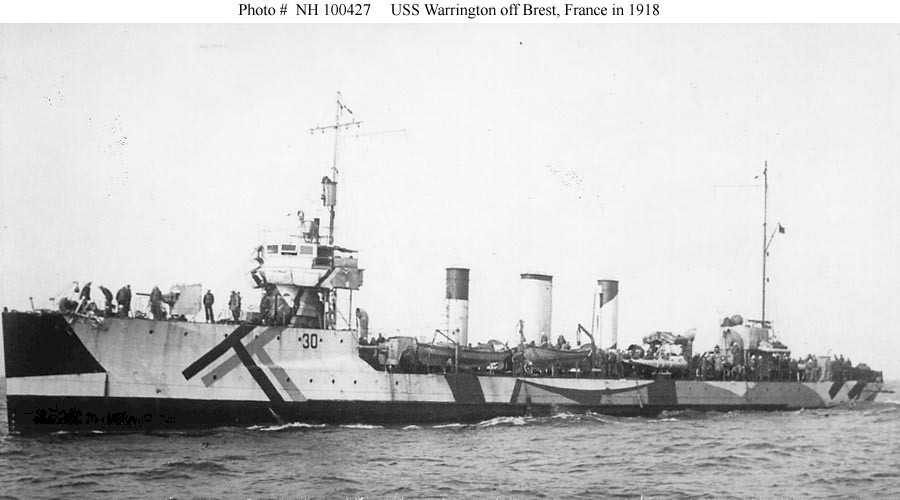

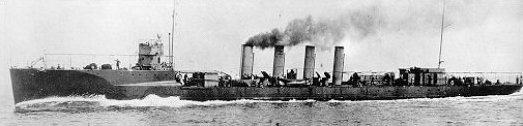

In May 1913, he took command of USS Jarvis, followed by commanding USS Flusser and the First Division, Torpedo Flotilla, from September 5, 1913, to July 20, 1915. During this period, his division escorted General Funston's Army to Vera Cruz, Mexico, and later transported American refugees from Tampico to Galveston. From 1915 to 1917, he had duty at the Naval Training Station, Newport, Rhode Island, with additional duty as the Assistant Umpire for Navy Department Strategic Maneuver No. 2, aboard USS Brooklyn, and attended a course at the Naval War College.

On April 6, 1917, he reported to USS Birmingham briefly, following which he was transferred to the gunboat Sacramento for a short period of duty as Aide to Commander Squadron TWO, Patrol Force, on coastal patrol from Cape Cod to Barnegat. On August 1, 1917, he reached London, England, on orders to the staff of Admiral Sims, and in July 1918, he conducted special additional duty at Southampton, investigating conditions aboard several small steamers. His exemplary service earned him a Special Letter of Commendation from the Secretary of the Navy.

William A. Ancrum as aide to Admiral Sims at the very beginning of World War One

Upon his return to the United States from London, he was ordered to report to Commander Cruiser-Transport Force, at Hoboken, New Jersey. There, he instructed merchant captains for a month, who were to be commissioned in the Navy for command of certain vessels assigned the task of bringing troops home from France. He then proceeded to the Boston Navy Yard to command USS Sigourney, which was completing a major overhaul, and assumed command of that vessel, with additional duty in command of Destroyer Division SIX.

About a year later, that division was decommissioned, and all personnel were transferred to Destroyer Division TWENTY-SIX, USS Alden flagship. In February 1920, part of that division left Philadelphia for Constantinople and the Adriatic. Their duty completed a year later, they joined the three other ships of their division in Manila, Philippine Islands.

While on this Near East assignment, Captain Ancrum was ordered back to Constantinople from the Adriatic command to assist in handling the 130,000 White Russians who retreated from the Crimea (in about 120 vessels of all types) when the Bolsheviks suddenly took it over, via the ice, after an unexpected freeze. He was then ordered to Cattaro Bay, Montenegro, to arrive in advance of these refugees, the first contingent of 20,000 which the Jugo-Slavs had agreed to care for. For outstanding service in the Adriatic - Venice, Pola, and Split - he was awarded the Italian decoration Order of Saints Maurice and Lazarus by the Government of Italy.

After his arrival in San Francisco in April 1921, Captain Ancrum was ordered to assume command of USS Tallahassee at Charleston, South Carolina. Detached a month later, he was named Naval Inspector of Ordnance, Homestead Steel Works, Munhall District, Pittsburgh, Pennsylvania. From December 1923 to May 1925, he served as Executive Officer of USS Utah, which took a diplomatic mission around South America, primarily to attend the Lima, Peru, celebration in commemoration of the Battle of Ayacucho. Captain Ancrum next commanded a regiment - one battalion from each of the battleships comprising Battleship Division TWO, Scouting Fleet, of which the New York was a unit, from May to August 1925. These men were sent ashore at the Naval Training Station, Hampton Roads, Virginia, to make room for the Naval Academy's Midshipmen for the annual summer cruise. He commanded USS Mercy, hospital ship, from September of that year until June 1926, and for a year thereafter was a student at the Naval War College, attending the Senior Course.

Reporting to Headquarters, Sixth Naval District, Charleston, South Carolina, on June 22, 1927, he served for two years as Captain of the Yard at the Charleston Navy Yard. He was then ordered to duty afloat, and for two years was Commanding Officer of USS Whitney, destroyer tender of the Scouting Fleet. On July 29, 1931, he reported as Marine Superintendent, Canal Zone. During his tour of duty, there occurred a slide in Gaillard Cut which stopped all transits for two days. Also, for the first time, the entire US Fleet made a continuous transit, requiring about two days, during which all other vessels were denied transit.

Captain Ancrum assumed command of USS Colorado, a unit of Battleship Division FOUR, Battle Force, on December 4, 1934. He was detached on February 15, 1936, and on March 30 reported to Headquarters, Fifth Naval District, Norfolk, Virginia, where he served for two years as Chief of Staff and Aide to the Commandant. He was relieved of all active duty and retired, after 40 years of Naval service, on September 1, 1938. Under orders of May 1941, he was recalled to active duty shortly before the United States entered World War II, and served in active status as Port Director, Sixth Naval District, from July 24, 1941, through March 12, 1945.

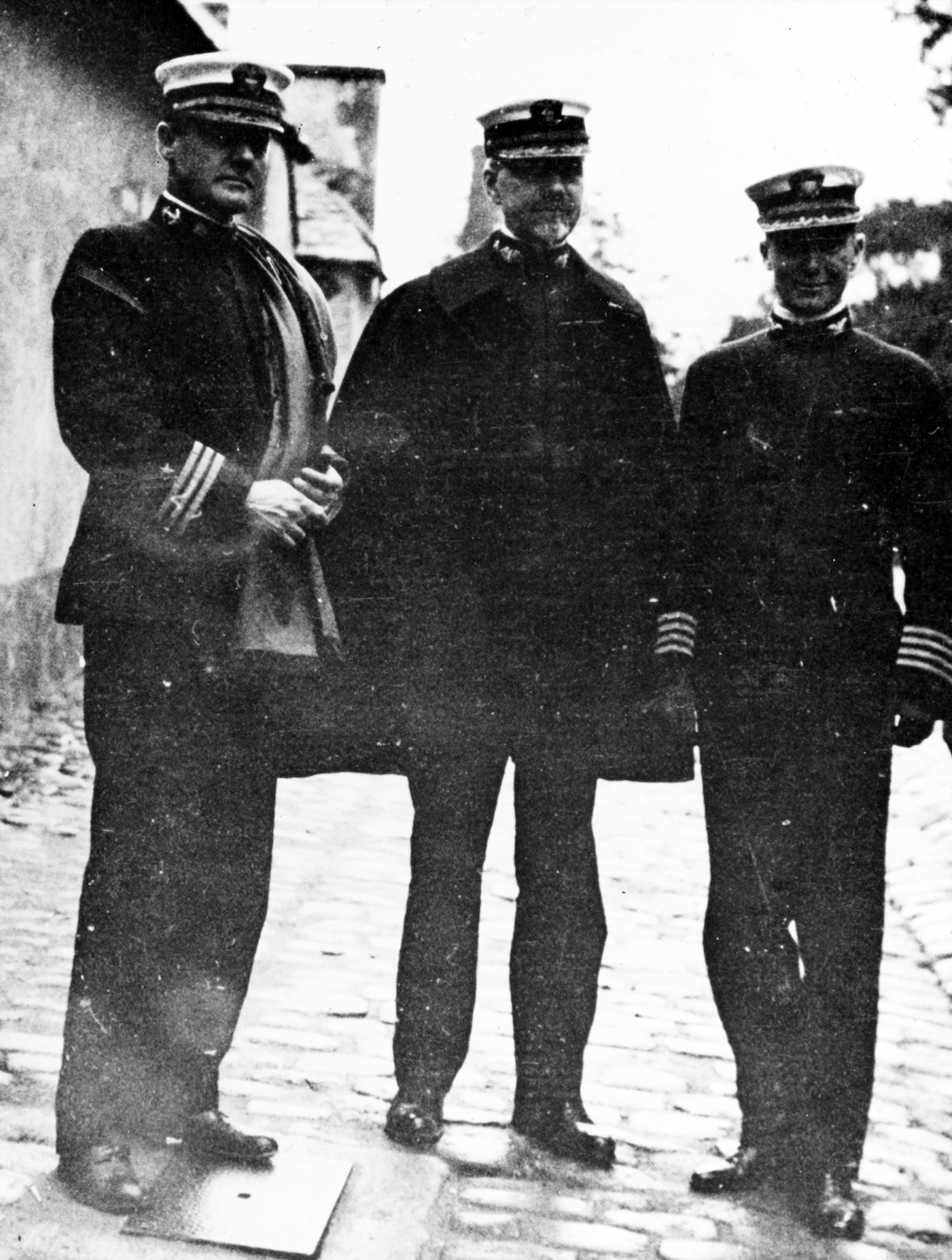
William Alexander Ancrum and Admiral Sims in France during World War I.

At his own request, he was again relieved of all active duty. He received a Letter of Commendation, with Ribbon, from the Secretary of the Navy for outstanding service as Port Director from July 1941 to March 1945. The commendation states: "Displaying exceptional leadership and administrative ability, Captain Ancrum supervised the control of all merchant ships, the Armed Guard and communication liaison groups aboard these vessels, using the ports within the Sixth Naval District. In addition, serving as Convoy and Routing Officer, Sixth Naval District, he planned the routing of all merchant vessels, hospital ships and certain naval auxiliaries and handled his duties in a manner far above that normally expected..."

== Awards and decorations ==
Here is the ribbon bar of Captain William Alexander Ancrum:

Rank and Insignia:

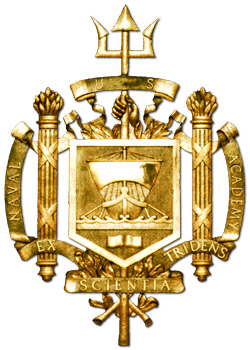
United States Naval Academy Midshipman – Class of 1903

| Ensign | Lieutenant, Junior Grade | Lieutenant | Lieutenant Commander | Commander | Captain |
| O-1 | O-2 | O-3 | O-4 | O-5 | O-6 |
| February 3, 1905 | | February 3, 1908 | August 28, 1916 | June 8, 1920 | June 4, 1926 |

| 1st Row | Navy Commendation Ribbon | | |
| 2nd Row | Mexican Service Medal | Philippine Campaign Medal | Spanish Campaign Medial |
| 3rd Row | World War I Victory Medal | World War II Victory Medal | American Campaign Medal |
| 4th Row | Officer of the Order of Saints Maurice and Lazarus (Italy) | Order of the Crown of Belgium Golden Palms, presented by King Albert (Belgium) | American Defense Service Medal with Fleet Clasp |

In addition to the Commendation Ribbon, Captain Ancrum received the Spanish Campaign Medal; the Philippine Campaign Medal; Mexican Campaign Medal; World War I Victory Medal; American Defense Service Medal; American Campaign Medal; and the World War II Victory Medal.

Like other high-ranking Allied military officers, Ancrum was bestowed with the honors of two separate knighthoods for his services during the liberation of Europe during the World War I and World War II. These included the Order of the Crown of Belgium by King Albert of Belgium, in October 1918; as well as the Order of Saints Maurice and Lazarus, from the Government of Italy. He was a veteran of five wars.

== Personal life ==
He married Cora Nesbit Carrison of Camden, South Carolina. They had two children who survived infancy:

1. Lt. William Alexander Ancrum IV, "Billy Boy," born March 22, 1910, he was a 1932 graduate of The Citadel in Charleston, SC. He was then commissioned a Second Lieutenant in the Coast Artillery, Officers Reserve Corps, US Army. He died in Florence, South Carolina, July 29, 1939.
2. Margaret Carrison Ancrum, who married Gen. Roger Trask Carleson, United States Marine Corps.

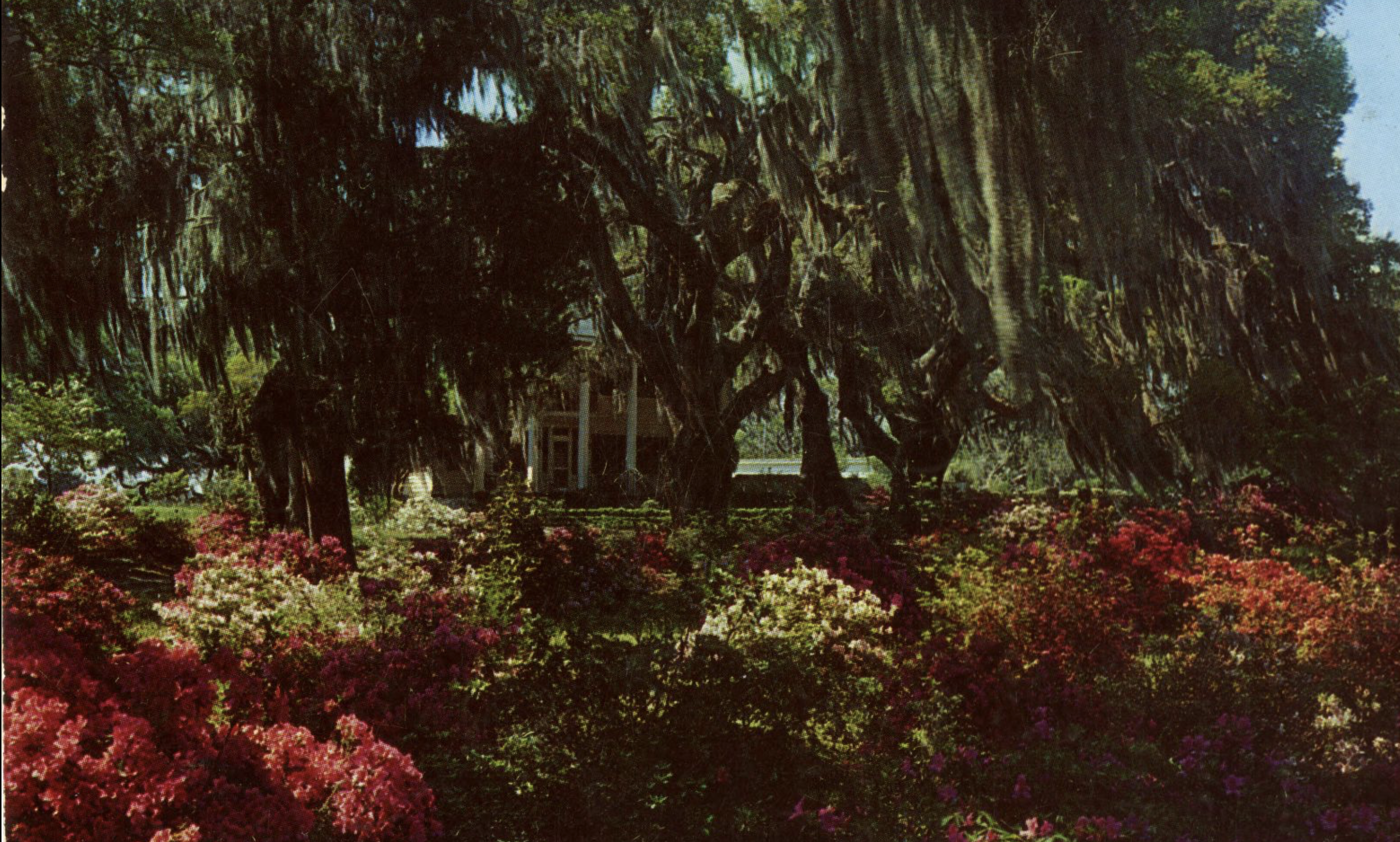

== Rossdhu Plantation ==
In 1938, Capt. Ancrum purchased Lower Waverly Plantation in Pawley's Island, South Carolina and renamed it Rossdhu Plantation, after his Calhoun ancestral home in Scotland. He and his wife retired here and spent the remainder of their lives in his native state, often traveling to Charleston and Camden to visit family. He remained a lifelong Episcopalian. After retiring to Rossdhu Plantation in Pawley's Island, the family became members of and attended All Saints' Parish Church, Waccamaw. After his son, William Alexander Ancrum IV, known as "Billy Boy," died early at the age of 29, his headstone was placed at this church. Subsequent Headstones were placed in Arlington National Cemetery and at the Ancrum Family Cemetery in downtown Camden, South Carolina.

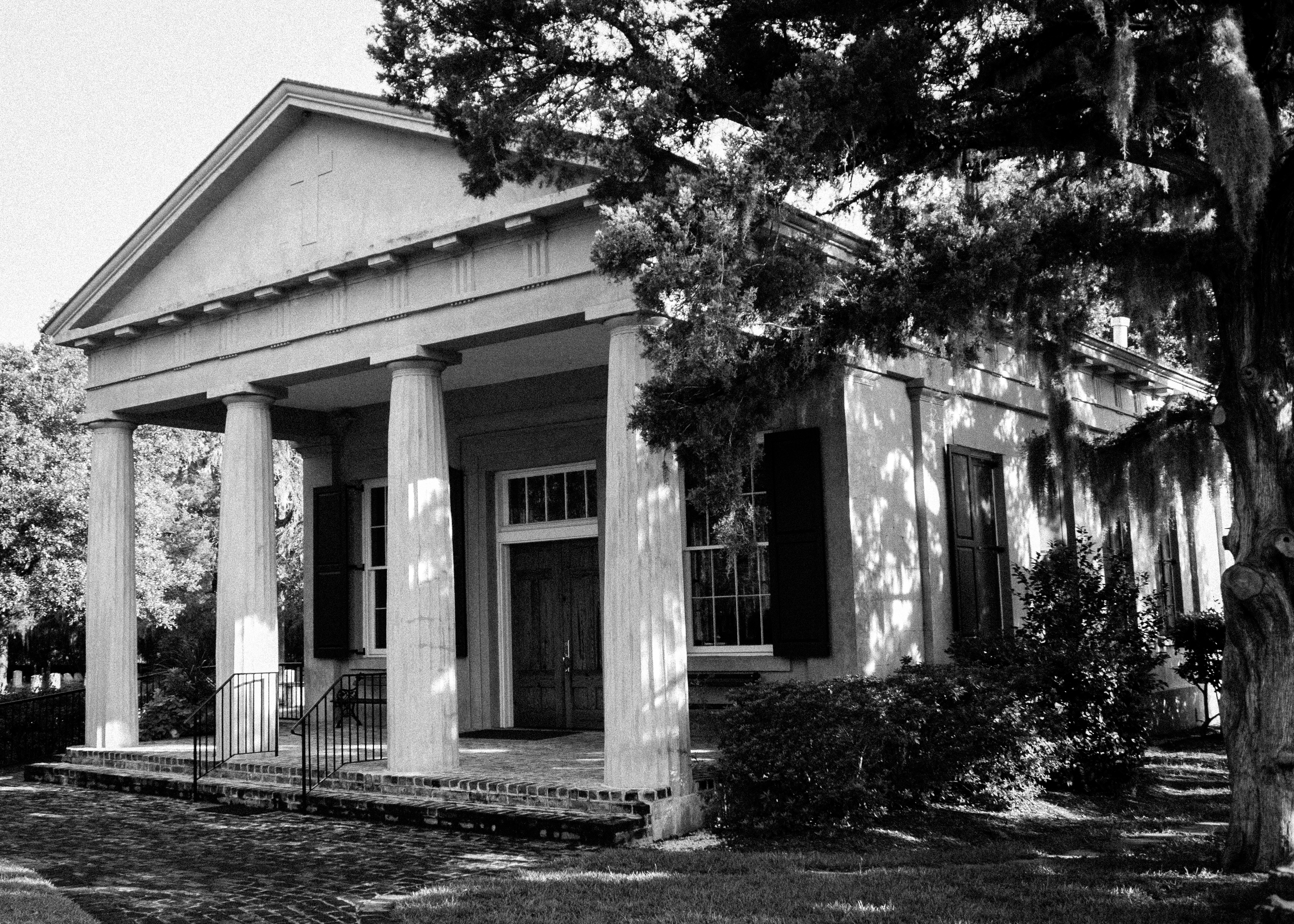
