= William Eure, 4th Baron Eure =

English nobleman

The Lord Eure

Personal details
- Born: c. 1579
- Died: 28 June 1646 (aged 66–67)
- Spouse: Lucy Noel (m. 1601; died 1615)
- Relations: William Eure, 2nd Baron Eure (grandfather)
- Children: 5
- Parent(s): Ralph Eure, 3rd Baron Eure; Mary Dawnay

William Eure, 4th Baron Eure (c. 1579 – 28 June 1646) was an English nobleman.

== Early life ==
Eure was born around 1579. He was the only son of Ralph Eure, 3rd Baron Eure of Ingleby and Malton and, his first wife, the former Mary Dawnay. After his mother's death in March 1612, his father remarried to Elizabeth (nee Spencer) Carey, Baroness Hundson (widow of George Carey, 2nd Baron Hunsdon and the second daughter of Sir John Spencer of Althorp). At that time, his surname was likely pronounced "Ewry", also given as Evers. His father was a diplomat and politician who served as an MP of the Parliament of England for Yorkshire.

His mother was the eldest daughter of Sir John Dawnay of Sessay and, his first wife, Elizabeth Tunstall (daughter of Sir Marmaduke Tunstall of Thurland Castle in Lancaster). His paternal grandparents were William Eure, 2nd Baron Eure and the former Margaret Dymoke (daughter of Sir Edward Dymoke of Scrivelsby and niece of Gilbert Tailboys, 1st Baron Tailboys of Kyme). The barony had been granted by King Henry VIII in 1544 to William Eure (c. 1483–1548), Warden of the Eastern March, and Governor of Berwick upon Tweed.

== Career ==
In December 1600 his uncle, Sir William Eure of Bradley, came into Scotland with his servant Clement Armorer. Sir Robert Kerr brought him to meet King James VI and Sir George Home at Spott. William Eure, the uncle, was imprisoned for this visit, suspected of treasonous dealings.

William Eure was created a Knight of the Bath on the eve (24th) of the English coronation of King James I and Queen Anna held at Westminster Abbey on 25 July 1603 that resulted in the Union of the Crowns. He was listed third of sixty-two.

Upon his father's death on 1 April 1617, he succeeded as the 4th Baron Eure.

The family fortunes sank during his tenure that despite selling both Witton and Jarrow, Eure remained so deeply in debt he had to garrison the family estate at Malton in July 1632 and withstand a siege from Sheriff Layton. When Lord Wentworth ordered cannon from Scarborough to breach the walls, "the stout old lord submitted."

== Personal life ==
On 15 September 1601, he was married to Lucy Noel (bur. 20 January 1615/6), daughter of Sir Andrew Noel of Dalby and Brooke and the former Mabel Harington (sixth daughter of Sir James Harington of Exton and sister of John Harington, 1st Baron Harington of Exton). Lucy's brother was Edward Noel, 2nd Viscount Campden. Together, they were the parents of:

- Hon. Ralph Eure of Bishop Middleham (c. 1602–1640), who was killed in a duel in 1640; he married Hon. Catherine Arundell (d. 1657), eldest daughter of Thomas Arundell, 1st Baron Arundell of Wardour), in 1627. She was the sister of Anne Arundell (wife of Cecil Calvert, 2nd Baron Baltimore) and Thomas Arundell, 2nd Baron Arundell of Wardour.
- Col. Hon. William Eure (d. 1644), who married Margaret Denton, daughter of Sir Thomas Denton of Hillesden. He died at the Battle of Marston Moor on 2 July 1644.
- Hon. Mary Eure (1602 - 28 January 1639), who married Sir William Howard of Naworth Castle and Henderskelfe Castle, the eldest son and heir of Sir Philip Howard (eldest son and heir apparent of Lord William Howard, and Hon. Elizabeth Dacre, sister and co-heiress of George Dacre, 5th Baron Dacre). Sir William's sister, Alathea Howard was the wife of Thomas Fairfax, 2nd Viscount Fairfax of Emley.
- Hon. Elizabeth Eure (d. 1654), who married Sir Francis Ireland of Nostell. With Sir Francis, Elizabeth had four children: William Ireland (b.1625) who married Barbara Eure of Washingborough and his descendants emigrated to America; Ralph Ireland (c.1626-1635); Elizabeth Ireland (b.1628); Marie or Mary Ireland (b.1629 to c.1667) was the "yonge bewtie" and friend of Marmaduke Rawdon and married Thomas Arthur, Esq. son of F. Arthur, an officer in the Star Chamber of Charles I of England. Their daughter Philothea was brought up in the household of Mary's cousin Sir Philip Howard. Philothea was the mother of Vincent Perronet.
- Hon. Frances Eure (d. 1652).

Lady Eure died and was buried on 20 January 1615/6. Lord Eure died on 28 June 1646 and was succeeded by his grandson William, the only son of his eldest son (who predeceased him).

=== Descendants ===
Through his second son William, he was a grandfather of Hon. Margaret Eure (d. 1688), who married Thomas Danby, the first Mayor of Leeds; and Hon. Mary Eure, who married William Palmes, MP for Malton. Both granddaughters were granted, by Royal sign-manual, the style and precedence of the daughter of a Baron, and subsequently inherited much of the remaining Eure family property.

Peerage of England
Preceded by Ralph Eure	Baron Eure; 1617–1646	Succeeded by William Eure
