= John Mallory (died 1619) =

English politician (1555 – 1619)

Sir John Mallory of Studley Royal (1555 – 14 August 1619) was an English politician.

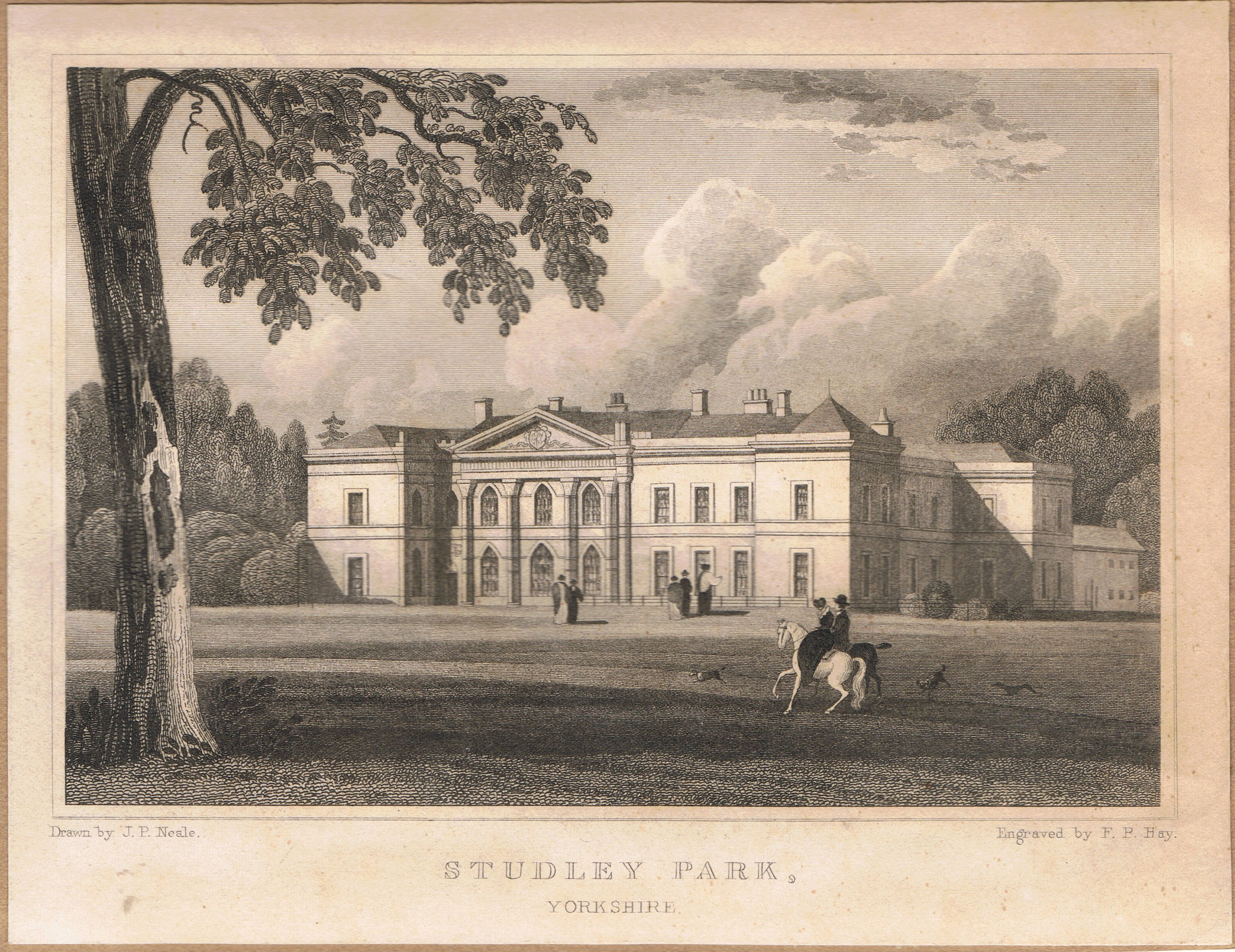
Studley Royal, Yorkshire, engraved by F. P. Hay after a drawing by J.P. Neale, c1820.

He was the son of Sir William Mallory of Hutton Conyers, Yorkshire who was the first in the family to become an MP, shortly after the Tudor monarchs began to modernise the parliamentary system. In January 1569 there were plans for Mary, Queen of Scots to spend a night at Hutton Conyers with William Mallory or at Norton Conyers, as she travelled between Bolton Castle and Tutbury Castle.

John Mallory succeeded his father in 1603 and was knighted the same year.

He was elected to Parliament for Thirsk in 1601 and for Ripon in 1604.

He and his family were regarded with suspicion by the Protestant monarchy due to their relation to Cardinal William Allen, who assisted in the planning of the Spanish Armada. His son, Christopher, was a religions recusant who fled to the Spanish-ruled Netherlands in exile shortly after the Gunpowder Plot in November 1605. John then attended the key conference with the Lords about reform of the recusancy laws (3 Feb. 1606).

He married by 1578 Anne, the daughter of William Eure, 2nd Baron Eure of Malton, Yorkshire and had 9 sons (of whom 3 predeceased him) and 6 daughters (of whom 2 predeceased him). He was the father of MP William Mallory and Priest Thomas Mallory (priest).
