= William Ancrum =

American merchant and slave trader (1722 - 1808)

Third General Assembly, Rep. District Eastward of Wateree River
- In office 1779–1780

Personal details
- Born: January , 1722 Scremerston, Northumberland, England
- Died: February 24, 1808 Charleston, South Carolina
- Relations: George Ancrum (brother), William Ancrum, Jr. (nephew), John Ancrum (cousin), William Alexander Ancrum (3rd-great nephew), Calhoun Ancrum (4th-great nephew

William Ancrum (c. 1722—February 24, 1808) was a wealthy American merchant, slave trader and indigo planter from Charleston, South Carolina who served in the Third General Assembly during the Revolutionary War (1779—1780). His interest in the economic potential of the Carolina backcountry led to his involvement in the formation of the present-day town of Camden, South Carolina. Of particular value to historians are the William Ancrum Papers, 1757–1789, which are made up of Ancrum's letters and personal account books, currently held by the South Carolina Library at the University of South Carolina. This collection provides insight into the economic impact of the American Revolution on Charleston planters and merchants, from the prices of slaves to restrictions on imports and exports.

== Early life and education ==
He was born the oldest of five siblings in 1722 in Northumberland, England. Ancrum received his early education in the Northumbrian village of Wooler, after which he went to London for a short period before leaving for South Carolina. By 1753 (possibly earlier) he had emigrated directly to Charleston, where on May 8 of that year he was admitted as a member of the South Carolina Society.

== Mercantile career ==
=== Ancrum, Lance, & Loocock ===
By 1756, Ancrum had entered into business with fellow Charlestonians Lambert Lance and Aaron Loocock. Operating under the name of Ancrum, Lance, & Loocock, this firm became successful over the next decade through its store on Broad Street. Ancrum, Lance, & Loocock participated in the slave trade from 1758 through 1765, and again in 1769, and were active in the fur trade between 1756 and 1766.

=== Founding Camden ===
In 1758, Ancrum had 150 acres surveyed for him in Pine Tree Hill, and in the same year sent his agents, Joseph and Ely Kershaw, to the spot to set up a store that was to function as a country branch of the Charleston-based Ancrum, Lance, & Loocock. The Kershaw brothers, along with John Chesnut, operated the Wateree store under the name of Ely Kershaw and Company. The success of this initial backcountry business led to the formation of at least two more stores, one on the Congaree River near present-day Columbia and another in the Cheraw area. They also owned a plantation called Liberty Hill on the Pee Dee River. This event has been viewed as the main impetus leading to the birth of the town of Camden, South Carolina. Kershaw County, South Carolina (of which Camden is the seat) was named for the two brothers.

== Planter ==
In addition to his mercantile pursuits, Ancrum also engaged rather extensively in planting. Independently, he received nearly 3,650 acres in land grants between 1763 and 1775. His two primary plantations were Red Bank and Hopewell, located adjacent to one another on the Wateree River about 7 mi (11 km) south of present-day Camden, South Carolina. The main crop grown on these plantations was indigo, like most plantations in the area at that time. Ancrum was an absentee landowner, and much can be learned of his role in that capacity through the numerous letters written to his overseers, which are part of the William Ancrum Papers, 1757-1789.

== Political roles ==
When the citizens of South Carolina entered resolutions demanding their equal treatment as colonists in 1774, Ancrum was elected to serve as a representative for St. Matthew's Parish on the newly formed Committee of Ninety-Nine. From 1779 to 1780 he was elected to serve as a representative for the District Eastward of the Wateree in the Third General Assembly. In May 1780, when Charleston fell under British control, Ancrum signed a congratulatory address to Henry Clinton, an act which subsequently resulted in his being designated a Loyalist. This, in conjunction with his service to the Crown on a committee to evaluate paper currency each month, led to his property being confiscated and his banishment from Charleston. While in London, Ancrum successfully petitioned the South Carolina State Legislature to lift the confiscation order and grant him twelve percent amercement. He returned to Charleston, where he remained a citizen until his death in 1808.

=== Other offices and memberships ===
- Fire-master for St. Philip's Parish (1764–1767)
- Elected to serve as a parish officer for both St. Michael's and St. Philip's Parishes in the capacity of fire-master along with Gabriel Manigault, Benjamin Smith, Thomas Smith Jr., and George Sheed (1765)
- Commissioner of the Workhouse & Markets & of the Poor (1770–1771)
- Member of the Charleston Library Society (1770–1808)
- Tax enquirer and collector for St. Philip's & St. Michael's parishes (1763; 1779)
- Long-serving elder and trustee of the First Scots Presbyterian Church in Charleston

== Death and burial ==
William Ancrum died on February 24, 1808, in Charleston, South Carolina. He was buried in the cemetery at First Scots Presbyterian Church in Charleston. Ancrum never married. His brother, George Ancrum, also of Charleston, married Catherine Porcher, the daughter of Isaac Porcher, and had one son named William Ancrum Jr. It was to his nephew (and namesake) that William Ancrum left the majority of his property.

== Legacy ==
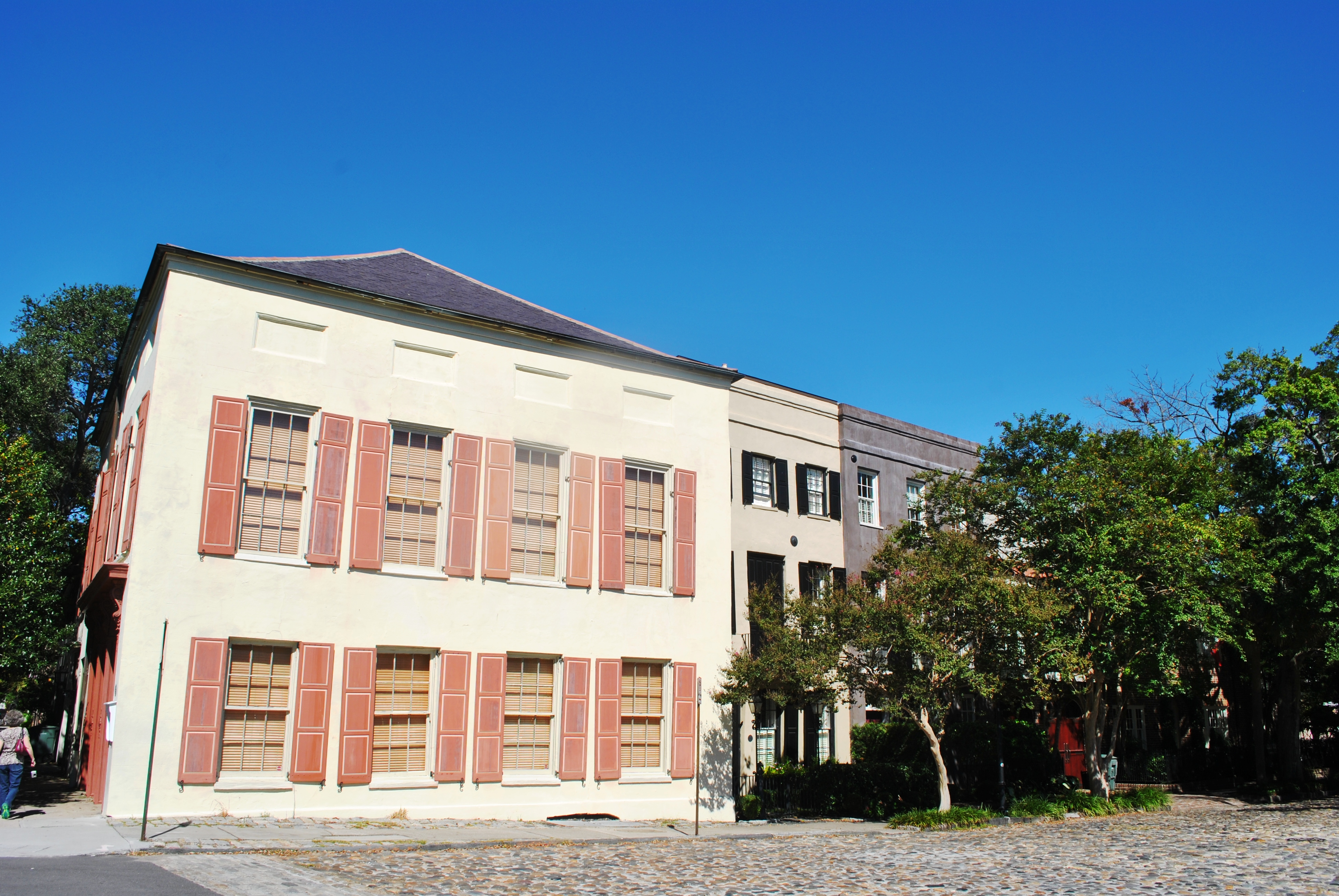
Ancrum Wharf Building

- Ancrum Street in Charleston (now Pinckney Street) was named after land that his cousin John Ancrum owned during the 18th century.
- The Ancrum Wharf Building, located at 90 East Bay Street in Charleston, was the wharf owned by his cousin and business partner, John Ancrum.
- The Ancrum House in Charleston (since demolished), at the corner of Charlotte and Meeting Streets, was named after members of the Ancrum family, previous owners of the property.
- Ancrum Swamp in Goose Creek (about 10 mi (16 km) from Charleston) was named for land owned by William Ancrum.
- Ancrum Road in Camden was named for him.
- Ancrum Road in Ladson (about 10 miles from Charleston.)
