= William Eure, 1st Baron Eure =

English nobleman in 16th century

William Eure
- 1st Baron Eure
- Arms of the Eures of Witton
- Born: 1483
- Died: 1548 (aged 64–65)
- Noble family: Eure
- Spouse: Elizabeth Willoughby
- Father: Ralph Eure
- Mother: Muriel Hastings

William Eure, 1st Baron Eure (c.1483–1548) of Witton was an English knight and soldier active on the Anglo-Scottish border. King Henry VIII made him Baron Eure by patent in 1544. The surname is often written as "Evers". William was Governor of Berwick upon Tweed in 1539, Commander in the North in 1542, Warden of the Eastern March, and High Sheriff of Durham. During the Anglo-Scottish war called the Rough Wooing, Eure and his sons Henry and Ralph made numerous raids against towns and farms in the Scottish Borders.

== Family ==
William was the son of Ralph Eure and Muriel Hastings. He married Elizabeth Willoughby, a daughter of Christopher Willoughby, 10th Baron Willoughby de Eresby. Their children included Sir Ralph, Henry, who was Master of the Ordnance at Berwick, Margery, Muriel, and Anne. Sir Ralph Eure, who was also Warden of the Middle March, married Margery Bowes, daughter of Ralph Bowes of Streatlam Castle and was killed at the Battle of Ancrum Moor in 1545. Their son William Eure later inherited the title as 2nd Baron Eure. Ralph's daughter Frances married Robert Lambton of Lambton.

== Quiet on the border ==
Ralph Eure defended Scarborough Castle against the Pilgrimage of Grace for 20 days in 1536 with a garrison comprising only his household servants. After the rebellion was crushed, Henry VIII assumed for himself the Wardenship of the Scottish Marches: William Eure was deputy Warden of the Eastern March. The Wardens were charged with keeping order on the border, dealing with encroachments from both sides and liaising with their opposite numbers.

At first, the border was quiet because James V of Scotland was in France seeking a bride. The situation did not deteriorate until at end of 1538, when James V was settled with Mary of Guise. In November 1538, James V came to Jedburgh and replaced his wardens of the East and Middle March. In December, Pope Paul III proclaimed his Bull of Excommunication against Henry VIII. William Eure and Thomas Wharton, deputy Warden of the West March had to complain to James V about the circulation of ballads against Henry which they said came from Scotland. Sir Christopher Morris, Master of the Ordnance, invested William as Keeper and Captain of the Castle and town of Berwick upon Tweed in January 1539, as the successor of Sir Thomas Clifford. Morris noted a great multitude of arms and munitions, all 'sore decayed'.

== Interlude at Linlithgow ==
One of William's letters gives the earliest description of the play A Satire of the Three Estates by David Lindsay of the Mount. William spoke to Sir Thomas Bellenden, who described a performance at Linlithgow Palace before James, Mary of Guise and his bishops and council on the feast of the Epiphany. As the play turned on the Reformation of the church, William obtained a more detailed description from a Scottish contact for Thomas Cromwell. Eure enclosed in his letter of 26 January 1540 the synopsis of the performance compiled by his spy, which corresponds with the later text of Lindsay's play.

Eure said he had talked with Bellenden, a member of the council of James V about the possibility of a Reformation of the 'spirituality' in Scotland. The play at Linlithgow had shown the 'naughtiness' of the church. Bellenden said after the play the King spoke to the churchmen in the audience asking them to reform their factions and manner of living, otherwise, he would send six of them into England to his uncle, King Henry VIII.

== Survey of Northumberland, 1541 ==
Beyond the regular duties of a border Warden, in 1541 William Eure was one of the commissioners appointed by Henry VIII to expel Scottish people from Northumberland following an Act of Parliament. In June he wrote to James V complaining that his border subjects had begun to pasture sheep and sow grain in England. In October they viewed the border along the river Tweed to the Ryden Burn's mouth and destroyed corn sown by Scots on English ground. The Scots drew away from the border thinking Eure's men were invaders. During this business, Eure held meetings at Alnwick and Etal. He hoped to induce men from Tynedale and Redesdale to avenge the murders of the Fenwick family by attacking the Scots in Liddesdale. By 4 November, he had found that there were a great number of Scottish householders, occupied as herdsmen, labourers or artisans, mostly without land, and they were evicted. Those too who held land or mills were replaced by English tenants. Many of the empty housing was not adequate for new English settlers, even if two houses were joined together. Other Scots were servants or apprenticed to English craftsmen, these were allowed to stay. Nevertheless, the use of Scottish apprentices would be discouraged in future.

William noted the valued service of a Scottish armourer called Troilus Taylor and a mountain guide, Gilbert Cocklands, who had been employed leading raids into Scotland. He requested that these useful people be made denizens of England and pointed out their repatriation would have an unhappy result. William's commission also included a survey of the border fortresses east to Harbottle Castle and the river Coquet. Many of the old Pele towers were in decay, and the owners lived in more convenient unfortified places ("that was a great pity to see"). He had commanded the owners to put the fortified houses in good order. He next planned to survey the strongholds of the Middle March. Generally, he found the border peaceful enough. Trouble came from the "traitorous Scottish thieves of Liddesdale" or Henry's "evil subjects of Tynedale and Redesdale" who seemed to combine together rather than respect the peace of Henry VIII or James V.

After showing an armed presence at Hexham, Willam planned to meet up with his colleagues at Newcastle upon Tyne on 17 November 1541 to finalise the survey. The historian Maureen Meikle finds that Eure had encouraged Scottish artisans to settle in the Middle March.

== Rough Wooing ==
Sir William and his sons Henry and Ralph were active during the war of the Rough Wooing and were stationed at Berwick upon Tweed. William Eure sent Lord Hertford news of rumours he had heard from Scotsmen that the Matthew Stewart, 4th Earl of Lennox, Regent Arran and Mary of Guise had held a meeting at Stirling Castle and would reconcile their differences. If their factions were united the Scots would be able to resist English ambitions to force the marriage of Mary, Queen of Scots and Prince Edward.

=== The burning of Edinburgh ===
Hertford organised a major assault by sea on Edinburgh for May 1544. William and Ralph Eure were to bring a diversionary force of March men to Haddington. Ralph asked Hertford for a reinforcement of 1000 Yorkshire archers so that they could press forward from Haddington to be in sight of the landing place at Granton. In the event, it was agreed that Hertford would summon Eure when he had disembarked his troops in Edinburgh. (When Eure's men arrived in Edinburgh they would get their pay). Hertford landed on Sunday 4 May 1544 and sent for Eure. His letter reached Berwick on Monday at 2pm, and Eure's reply was received at Leith on Tuesday at 5pm. 4000 border horsemen arrived in Edinburgh on Wednesday 7 May. While the army was camped near Seton Palace, Lord Maxwell requested to speak to Ralph Eure but Hertford would not allow it. Instead, Maxwell was brought back to England.

=== Assurances ===
On 7 June 1544, a number of Scottish borderers gave their oath to be "full part takers" with England, known "Assured Scots". Ralph Eure, as Warden of the Middle March, was given three "pledges" or hostages for the fulfilment of the oath by 24 members of the Oliver family and their kinsmen. These were Dandy Oliver, Rinyan (Ninian) Oliver and Patty Oliver who were kept at Warkworth Castle. On the same day Ralph took four Nixon hostages for the loyalty of 35 Nixons, and four Crosiers for 50 of their family, and 3 hostages for the Hall family.

In October 1544, Ralph Eure gained the allegiance of Andrew Kerr of Ferniehurst and 40 followers of various names and the town of Jedburgh. Eure took 21 hostages, including a man for each family name. If the Scots failed to fulfil their contract of assurance the hostages could be executed.

=== Jedburgh ===
On 9 June 1544, Sir William and his colleagues met at Milfield near Wooler and decided to march on Jedburgh. The final plan had been proposed by Lord Hertford on 27 May 1544 and endorsed by the English Privy Council and Henry VIII, after Hertford had discussed the pros and cons of a more modest attack in March with Ralph Eure. An assault on Jedburgh had also been proposed as part of the major raid in May. Two days before the meeting at Milfield, Ralph Eure had written to Lord Hertford from Warkworth Castle, explaining that his father was ill ("somewhat crossed") and reassuring Hertford that he could lead his father's East March men. Ralph asked Hertford to send his trumpeter for the Jedburgh raid.

However, William seems to have led the raid. At Jedburgh, where he had heard there were seven cannons at the marketplace, he divided his force into three. The Scottish defenders fled without engaging. Sir William burnt the Abbey, the Greyfriars and various bastle and fortified houses in the town. They captured 500 horses and seven cannons. On their way back to England, they burnt the Tower of Cailing Craig, Cessford Castle, Morebattle church, Otterburn, Cowboge and other places. Near to the English border, at Kirk Yetholm, they observed fires raised by a Scottish raiding party. Ralph Eure with Richard Bowes, Captain of Norham, and 500 men rode forward and captured or killed a number of Scots.

=== Coldingham ===
Later in the month, Henry Eure and George Bowes captured Coldingham, where the Priory was defended by cannon, after a 5-hour battle. Subsequently, William Eure wrote to the Earl of Shrewsbury that he had escorted the Italian military surveyor Archan (Archangelo Arcano) to Coldingham. The new Captain of Coldingham, George Bowes, said he could hold the place for 40 hours against the Scottish army if they brought two cannons. Ralph had reported to William that Regent Arran with other Scottish lords were gathering an invasion force at Dunbar. Ralph also sent this news to Shrewsbury. The Lords of the Privy Council had already found Ralph's intelligence gathering useful, and in January they had authorised Shrewsbury to cover the sums that Ralph laid out for "compassing sundry exploits and intelligence." Arran's host did move towards Coldingham, but Arran halted this advance before Sir William's force could engage him. Henry Eure, in July 1544, joined George Bowes and raided Edrom, Preston, Patrick Hume's Tower and Duns. On 3 July, William Eure organised the burning of the Castle of Greenlaw. Ralph burnt the Barmkin of Ormiston and the church tower at Eckford.

=== Muirhouse and Ancrum Moor ===
The Eure family continued these raids into November and again in 1545. As a Scottish army mustered on the eastern border near Lauder, Ralph argued for an attack on Hawick. A raid to Melrose or Jedburgh led to Ralph Eure's death at the battle of Ancrum Moor in February 1545, his companions Basford and a Scotsman John Rutherford of Edgerston cut down beside him. Regent Arran was shown Ralph's body by a man called Vicar Ogle, and said;

God have mercy on him, for he was a fell cruel man and over cruel, which many a man and fatherless bairn might rue; and, wellaway that ever such slaughter and bloodshedding should be amongst Christian men.

The defeat at Ancrum was blamed on Ralph's over-reliance on his wavering Scottish allies and his foolhardy courage. Robert Bowes was made Warden of the Middle March in his place. To avenge Ralph, Henry Eure and George Bowes went to Bowmont in Teviotdale and demolished two towers and burnt farmsteads belonging to the Laird of Molle (Mow).

In March 1548 Henry Eure reported his father's death to Lord Grey of Wilton. Henry's next duty was to make inquiries about a captured Lieutenant of Spanish mercenaries and an Italian who had escaped and fled to Scotland.

== Governance of Berwick ==
The diplomat Ralph Sadler reported to Thomas Wriothesley in April 1545 that William was not suitable to be Captain of the town of Berwick. Eure and Sir Cuthbert Ratcliff, Captain of the castle of Berwick; were "men of honesty and meet to serve elsewhere", but of no experience or knowledge for keeping a fortress. Eure had a long-running dispute with Thomas Gower, the Marshall of Berwick (father of Sir Thomas Gower, 1st Baronet) Gower was summoned to attend the Privy Council in London and after failing to answer Eure's allegations, was sent to the Fleet Prison in June 1546.

The council also arbitrated between Eure and Cuthbert Ratcliffe over the rights of Berwick Castle to tithes and fishing, Eure have previously been the Captain. In May 1547 he was placed in charge of stores at Lindisfarne and asked to assist in the fortification of the place according to the designs of William Ridgeway and Richard Lee, without diminishing the garrison at Berwick.

After William Eure's death, although Grey of Wilton wrote to Somerset on Henry Eure's behalf for his father's offices, the Wardenship of the East March and Governorship of Berwick were given to Grey of Wilton himself. However, Ralph's son, William Eure, 2nd Baron Eure was later made Warden of the Middle March and Governor of Berwick. Another Ralph Eure, a brother of this William Eure, was killed in a duel fought with spears by William Kirkcaldy of Grange in 1557.

Peerage of England
New creation	Baron Eure; 1544–1548	Succeeded by William Eure
