= George Eure, 6th Baron Eure =

George Eure, 6th Baron Eure (–1672) (Note: There is some disagreement if George was the 6th or 7th Baron. For example, John Burke states he was the 7th baron while Charles Firth states he was the 6th (Burke 1831, p. 109, Firth 1974, p. 250).) was a Parliamentary supporter during the English Civil War and was the only holder of a peerage created before the Interregnum to sit in Cromwell's Upper House.

He inherited the title in 1652 from his cousin William Eure, 5th Baron Eure. The previous heir-presumptive, Sir William Eure, a colonel in the Royalist army who died fighting at the Battle of Marston Moor, is sometimes wrongly stated to have succeeded as 6th Baron.

Mark Noble suggests that as George was not wealthy, he chose the side which was evidently the most powerful. Though he was a Peer of the Realm, he did not think it beneath him to sit in the House of Commons as a member for Yorkshire. He accepted a nomination to the Barebones Parliament called by Oliver Cromwell in 1653, was elected in 1654 for the East Riding of that county to the First Protectorate Parliament, and was elected in 1656 for the North Riding to the Second Protectorate Parliament. Cromwell, therefore, could not do less than place Eure in his "House of Lords". Eure survived the Restoration and long afterwards, and sat in the restored House of Lords.

George Eure died a bachelor in 1672.

He was succeeded by his brother Ralph, Lord Eure, who joined with the Duke of Monmouth and others in petitioning Charles II against the Roman Catholics in 1680–1; and ― in the view of Mark Noble ― was one of those who had the courage to accuse James Duke of York of being a "popish" recusant. With Ralph's death, without issue, in 1690, the title became extinct.

Another of the brothers was Samual Eure, Esq., a colonel in the royal army, and a compounder upon that account for his estate.

A relation of theirs was Isaac Eure (Ewer), Esq., who was a colonel in the Parliamentary Army. Ewer was sent to conduct King Charles I from the Isle of Wight to Hurst Castle, named one of the commissioners to sit in judgment upon his sovereign (which he did, and signed the warrant for his execution); was one of those who were sent in 1649 to Ireland. Happily for himself, he died before the Restoration, but at that time his estates were confiscated.

== Notes ==
Footnotes

Citations

Peerage of England
Preceded by William Eure	Baron Eure; 1652—1672	Succeeded by Ralph Eure
