= John Mallory =

English politician and soldier

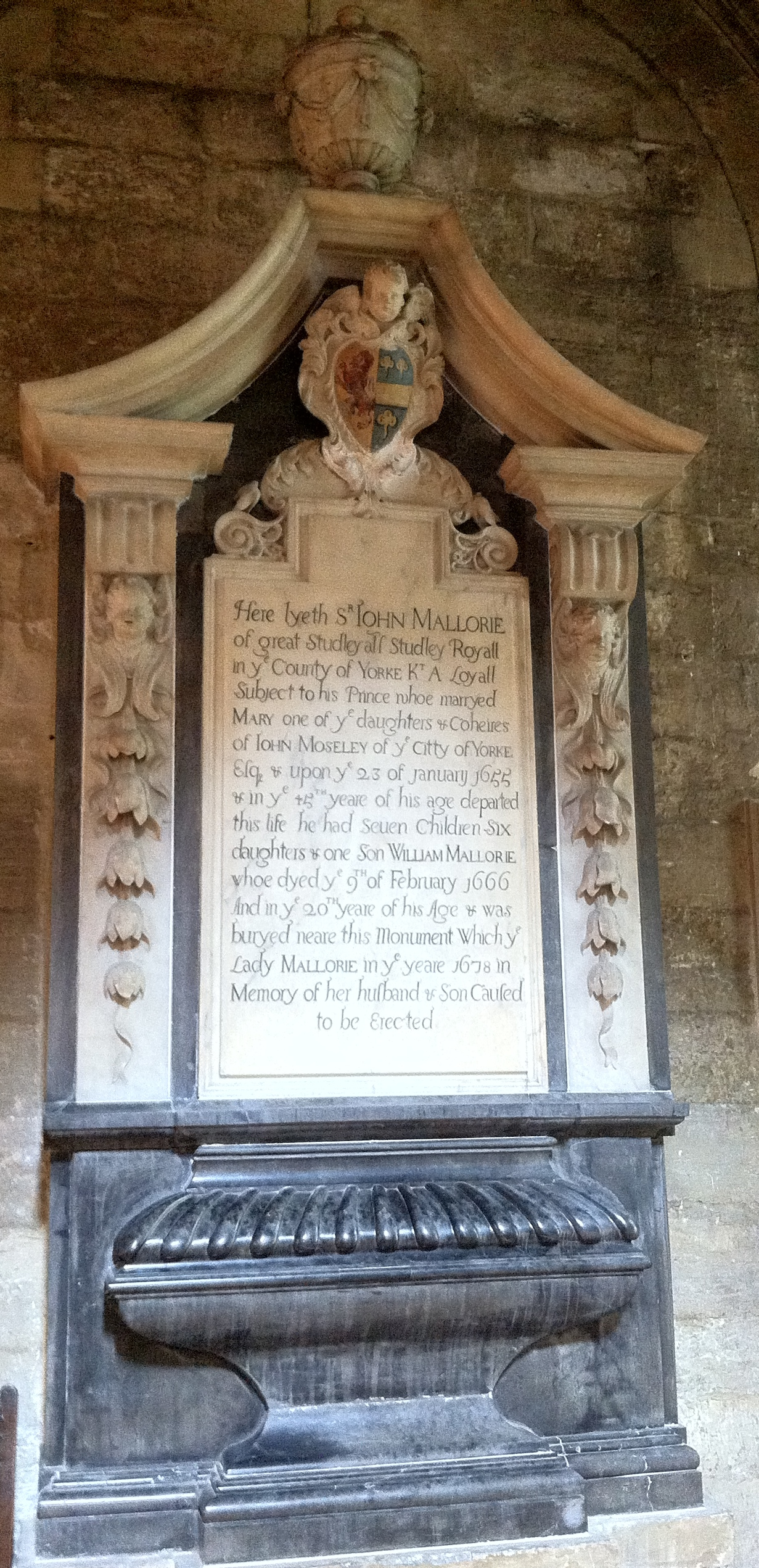
Memorial to John Mallorie in Ripon Cathedral

Sir John Mallorie (1610 – 23 January 1655) was an English politician who sat in the House of Commons from 1640 to 1642. He fought on the Royalist side in the English Civil War.

Mallory was the son of William Mallory and his wife Dorothy Bellingham, daughter of Sir James Bellingham of Levens, in Westmorland. John resided at Studley Royal, home to the family since 1452, which was added to their Hutton Conyers estate.

In November 1640, Mallory was elected together with his father as Member of Parliament for Ripon in the Long Parliament. He was knighted by King Charles I in December 1641 and was disabled from sitting in Parliament on 16 January 1642. By August 1642 Mallory had command of a regiment of infantry in the King's army. He was governor of Skipton Castle. He later compounded for the delinquency of himself and his father.

Mallory died aged 45, possibly of a contagious disease, as he was buried the next day in Ripon Cathedral in the family chapel.

Mallory married Mary Moseley, daughter of John Moseley Lord Mayor of York.

Parliament of England
Preceded by William Mallory; Sir Paul Neille	Member of Parliament for Ripon; 1640; With: William Mallory	Succeeded by Sir Charles Egerton; Miles Moody
