= Battle of Ancrum Moor =

Battle in the War of the Rough Wooing

Coordinates: 55.53675°N 2.60758°W

- Part of Anglo-Scottish Wars
Date	27 February 1545
Location	Four miles northwest of Jedburgh, Scotland
Result	Scottish victory

Belligerents
Kingdom of Scotland	Kingdom of England: German and Spanish Mercenaries

Commanders and leaders
Earl of Arran; Earl of Angus	Sir Ralph Eure †; Sir Brian Layton †

Strength
Approx 2,500	5,200

Casualties and losses
Unknown	800 killed 1,000 prisoners

Registered battlefield
- Designated: 21 March 2011
- Reference no.: BTL2

The Battle of Ancrum Moor was fought during the War of the Rough Wooing in 1545. The Scottish victory put a temporary end to English incursions in the Scottish border and lowlands. The battlefield has been included in the Inventory of Historic Battlefields in Scotland and protected by Historic Scotland under the Historic Environment (Amendment) Act 2011.

== Background ==
As his reign drew to a close, King Henry VIII sought to secure the alliance of Scotland and the marriage of the infant Mary, Queen of Scots, to his son Prince Edward. He had the support of some Scots nobles who had been taken prisoner at the Battle of Solway Moss and mixed diplomacy with the threat of force, but in December 1543, the Scottish Parliament, after much internal dissension, decided to reject Henry's overtures and instead renew the alliance with France.

== Campaign ==
Henry's reaction was to declare war against Scotland. This attempt to cajole Scotland into alliance was another episode in England's long history of antagonism with her northern neighbour. Henry VIII desired a diplomatic marriage that would neutralise the effects of Scotland's own international relations on his borders. The war was later called the "Rough Wooing".

Henry ordered the Earl of Hertford to devastate Edinburgh, Leith and many other towns. Hertford dutifully laid waste to much of southern Scotland in two expeditions in 1544, burning Edinburgh in May.

In 1545, an army under Sir Ralph Eure (alternatively spelt "Evers") continued to pillage in the Borders. Perhaps their worst atrocity was the burning of Brumehous Tower with the lady of the house and her children and servants inside. The attacks had forged an unlikely alliance between the Earl of Arran, Regent for the infant Mary, and the Earl of Angus. These two Scottish nobles had long been bitter rivals for many years, and had even fought a pitched battle in the streets of Edinburgh in 1520. However, Angus's estates had been targeted during the recent border raids. Angus learned that Eure had been granted some of his lands in the Scottish borders by Henry VIII, and he declared that he would witness the title deeds with a sharp pen and red ink. Internal Scottish politics were set aside, Arran and his rival for power Mary of Guise were reconciled with the Earl of Angus and his brother George Douglas of Pittendreich at the Parliament of Scotland in December 1544, when the Douglases were pardoned for their previous treasons with England.

The Scottish army consisted initially of between 300 and 1,000 "lances" under Angus, and a similar number of troops from Fife under George Leslie, 4th Earl of Rothes and Norman Leslie, Master of Rothes. They were joined by Borderers under Scott of Buccleuch, whose lands had also suffered devastation at Eure's hands. Together, they moved to confront the English army near Jedburgh.

== Battle ==
The English Army consisted of 3,000 German and Spanish mercenaries, 1,500 English borderers under Sir Brian Layton and 700 "assured" Scottish borderers. As they settled into an encampment under Gersit Law, a small Scottish force made a feint attack and then retreated southwest towards Palace Hill. Much of the English force followed in pursuit. As they crossed the top of Palace Hill and chased down the far side, they found that the whole Scottish army had been hidden on the far side of the hill. The Scots had the advantage of surprise, and of the setting sun which was behind them, dazzling the English, and of the westerly wind which blew gunpowder smoke from arquebuses and pistols towards the English.

A charge by Scottish pikemen drove the English back in disarray. Here the longer Scottish pikes were used to advantage;

the Scottismen's speares war longer then the Inglismen's be fyve quareteris, or an elne, quhilk, when they joyned with the Inglishmen, they had thame all rivin doune before evir the Inglishmenis speares might touch thame.

The ground was too uneven for the English to rally at the top of Palace Hill. As they tried again to rally on the eastern slope, the Scottish Borderers with them chose to tear off the red crosses which signified their adherence to England and revert to their former allegiance. The English army broke and was forced to scatter through a hostile countryside.

=== Regent Arran visits the field ===
According to an English report, Regent Arran came to the battlefield and congratulated the Earl of Angus. He asked a prisoner to identify Ralph Eure's body. Arran wept, and said;

God have mercy on him, for he was a fell cruel man and over cruel, which many a man and fatherless bairn might rue, and wellaway that ever such slaughter and bloodshedding should be amongst Christian men.

Regent Arran's visit to the field was also mentioned by the 16th-century Scottish chronicle writers John Lesley and Robert Lindsay of Pitscottie, who have the Governor and Regent give thanks for the unexpected victory, where "so small a number discomfited so great a host and one so well appointed (equipped)." As the modern historian Marcus Merriman notes, the size of the English battle group was rare, larger than any border raiding party, especially considering the winter conditions. Arran's movements are documented in his household account book held by the National Records of Scotland, which records payments for messengers at the time of battle and a celebration afterwards at Hume Castle.

== Outcome ==
The English lost 800 men killed (including Eure and Layton) and 1,000 taken prisoner. This temporarily stopped their harrying of Scotland. News of the victory also induced Francis I of France to send troops to aid the Scots, although they achieved little. The war came to an end shortly afterwards on the death of Henry VIII, only to break out again with perhaps even more violence when Hertford, now Protector Somerset ruling on behalf of Edward VI, sought to impose his own political and religious settlement on Scotland.

== Fair maiden Lilliard ==
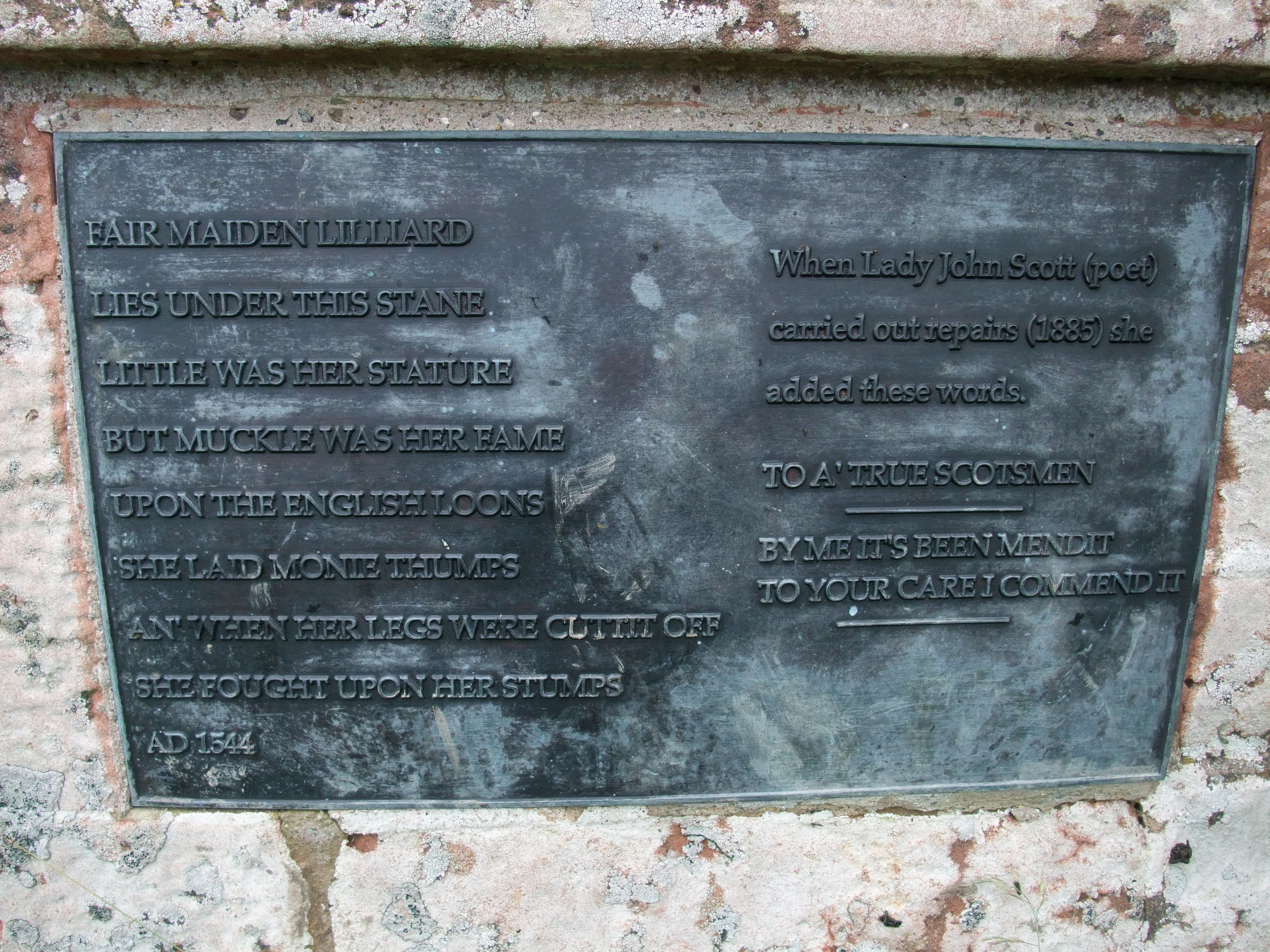
Plaque on Lilliards Stone

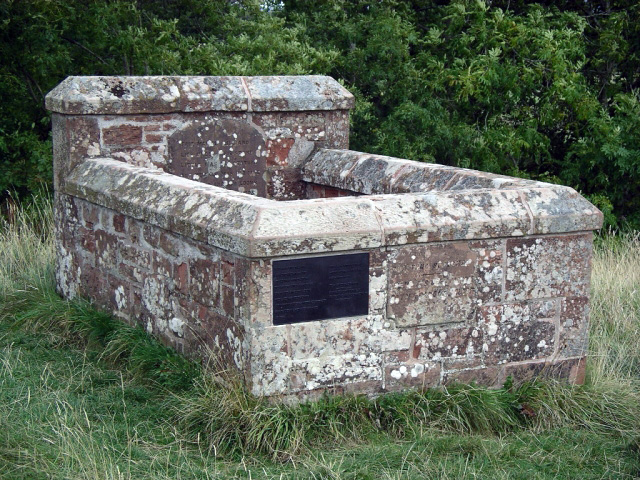
Lilliard's Stone on Lilliard's Edge

A monument on the site of the battle, also known as Lilliard's Edge, records the following traditional verse:

Fair maiden Lilliard
lies under this stane
little was her stature
but muckle was her fame
upon the English loons
she laid monie thumps
and when her legs were cuttit off
she fought upon her stumps.
- AD 1544

The monument was erected in the 19th century, although it replaced an earlier stone with the same inscription, which is recorded as being in pieces in 1743. Lilliard is said to have fought at the battle following the death of her lover. However, her story is entirely apocryphal, as the name of the location is recorded as "Lillesietburn" in the 12th century, and as "Lillyat Cros" in 1378. Alternative names of the battle site were recorded as "Ankiram Muir" and "Lillizart Cors" in Regent Arran's household accounts for February 1545. The verse itself is based on the earlier English border ballad of Chevy Chase.

== See also ==
- Ancrum
- Ancrum Old Parish Church
- List of places in the Scottish Borders

== Sources ==
- Buchanan, George, Rerum Scoticarum Historia, (1582), book 15 chapters 20-21, (Latin & English translation, Dana Sutton, University of Birmingham, Philological Museum)
- Fraser, George MacDonald (1971). The Steel Bonnets. Harper Collins. ISBN 0-00-272746-3.
- Mackie, R. L. A Short History of Scotland, 1962.
- Warner, Philip (1995). Famous Scottish Battles. Leo Cooper. ISBN 0-85052-487-3.
