= John Acclom =

John Acclom was the name of two Members of Parliament:

- John Acclom (14th-century politician)
- John Acclom (15th-century politician) (1395–1458)
