= Scarborough by-election =

Scarborough by-election may refer to:

== Canada ==
- 2026 Scarborough Southwest federal by-election
- 2026 Scarborough Southwest provincial by-election
- 2023 Scarborough—Guildwood provincial by-election

== United Kingdom ==
- 1915 Scarborough by-election
- 1869 Scarborough by-election
