= George Harcourt Vanden-Bampde-Johnstone, 3rd Baron Derwent =

British author, diplomat and Liberal politician (1899–1949)

The Right Honourable The Lord Derwent FRSA
- Derwent in 1947
- Born: George Harcourt Vanden-Bampde-Johnstone; 22 October 1899; London, England
- Died: 13 January 1949 (aged 49); Paris, France
- Education: Sandroyd School; Charterhouse School; Merton College, Oxford
- Political party: Liberal
- Spouse: Countess Sabine Czaykowska Iliesco (m. 1929; died 1941)
- Parent: Hon. Edward Vanden-Bempde-Johnstone
- Relatives: Patrick Vanden-Bempde-Johnstone, 4th Baron Derwent (brother)

George Harcourt Vanden-Bampde-Johnstone, 3rd Baron Derwent FRSA (22 October 1899 – 13 January 1949), was a British author, diplomat and Liberal politician.

== Early life ==
Derwent—always known to his family and friends as "Peter"—was born in London on 22 October 1899. He was the son of Hon. Edward Henry Vanden-Bempde-Johnstone, and Hon. Evelyn Mary Agar-Ellis.

His father was a younger son of Harcourt Vanden-Bempde-Johnstone, 1st Baron Derwent and Charlotte Mills (the daughter of Sir Charles Mills, 1st Baronet). His maternal grandparents were Leopold Agar-Ellis, 5th Viscount Clifden and the former Hon. Harriet Stonor (a daughter of Thomas Stonor, 3rd Baron Camoys). In 1929, upon the death of his uncle, Francis, he inherited the Derwent barony.

Derwent was educated at Sandroyd School, followed by Charterhouse. Many of his contemporaries at the latter school believed Derwent to be attracted to men, and while singing in the school choir he met the future poet and novelist Robert Graves. Derwent and Graves struck up a close friendship which appears to have been romantic—Graves later said their relationship was "proto-homosexual" but denied that they were ever involved sexually, instead describing their romance as "chaste and sentimental".

After Charterhouse, Derwent went up to Merton College, Oxford where he won the Newdigate Prize in 1920. He succeeded as the third Baron Derwent on the death of his uncle in 1929.

== Career ==
On leaving Merton, he joined the diplomatic service and served as an honorary attaché from 1929 at Warsaw, Brussels and Madrid. At the start of the Second World War, he was in Bern before he returned to the United Kingdom in 1942 to serve in the Royal Air Force until 1944.

Derwent was a Liberal party politician, president of the Yorkshire Liberal Federation, and co-treasurer of the British Liberal International Council, member of the council of the Georgian Group, of which he was a founder, and a Fellow of the Royal Society of Arts.

=== Author and poet ===
As an author and poet Derwent wrote under his own name but also the pen name 'George Vanden'. Two volumes of poetry were published in 1931 (Fifty Poems) and 1943 (Before Zero Hour).

== Personal life ==
On 21 December 1929, Derwent married Countess Sabine Czaykowska Iliesco, the daughter of General D. Iliesco, Chief of the Romanian General Staff. "Asked by the British Who's Who to list his recreations, he put down, 'Fishing, golf, and thinking the twentieth century is just wonderful.'"

Lady Derwent died in Bern on 18 May 1941. In November 1948, his engagement to Mlle. Carmen Gandarillas, daughter of José A. Gandarillas, the secretary to the Chilean Embassy in London was announced. However, Lord Derwent died before the marriage took place. Upon his death in Paris on 13 January 1949, aged 49, on his way back from a health visit to Switzerland, he was succeeded by his younger brother Patrick as they had no children.

Peerage of the United Kingdom
Preceded by Francis Vanden-Bempde-Johnstone	Baron Derwent; 1929–1949	Succeeded by Patrick Vanden-Bempde-Johnstone
