= Sir John Legard, 1st Baronet =

Member of the Parliament of England

Coat of arms of Sir John Legard, 1st Baronet

Crest
A greyhound passant Or collared Sable studded Argent.
Escutcheon
Argent on a bend between six mullets pierced Gules a cross patee Or.
Motto
Per Crucem Ad Stellas

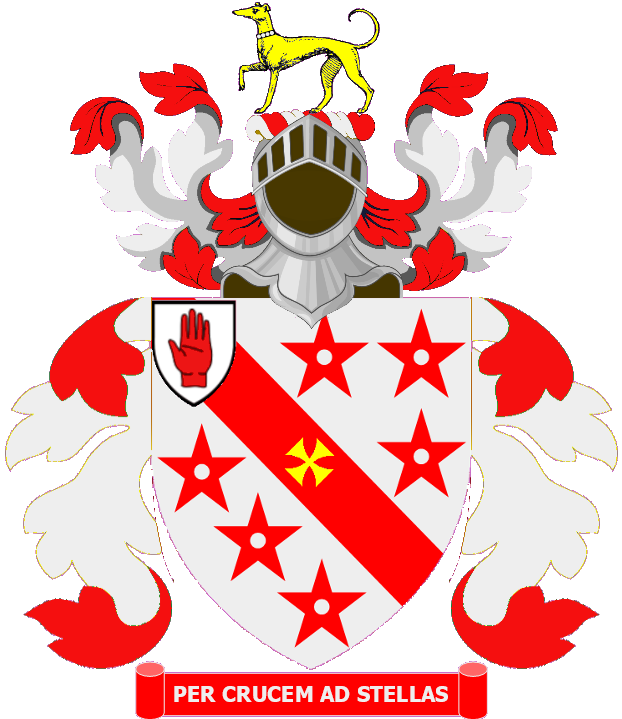
Arms as baronet of Ganton

Sir John Legard, 1st Baronet (1631 – 1 July 1678), of Ganton in Yorkshire, was an English landowner and Member of Parliament.

He was the eldest son of John Legard of Ganton (d. 1638) and Mary, daughter and heir of John Dawnay of Potter Brompton At the outbreak of the English Civil War his grandfather supported Parliament. He succeeded to his grandfather's estate in 1643. In 1649 he entered Clare College, Cambridge and was admitted to the Middle Temple the following year.

He was elected to Parliament in 1660 as member for Scarborough, though he only represented the borough for a few months. In December of the same year he was created a baronet, apparently in recognition of his support for the king's restoration to the throne.

Legard died in 1678. In 1655 he had married Grace Darcy (d. 1658), daughter of The Earl of Holderness. They had one child Grace, who married John Hill of Thornton. After the death of his first wife he remarried, on 12 August 1658, his second wife being Frances Widdrington, daughter of Sir Thomas Widdrington, a former Speaker of the House of Commons. They had six children:

- John, who succeeded him in the baronetcy
- Dorothy, who married Thomas Grimston of Grimston Garth
- Frances, who married George Bowes
- Thomas
- William
- Widdrington

Parliament of Great Britain
| Preceded by Luke Robinson | Member of Parliament for Scarborough; 1660; With: Luke Robinson | Succeeded by Luke Robinson; William Thompson |
| Preceded by Luke Robinson; William Thompson | Member of Parliament for Scarborough; 1660–1661; With: William Thompson | Succeeded by Sir Jordan Crosland; William Thompson |
Baronetage of England
| New creation | Baronet (of Ganton); 1660–1678 | Succeeded by John Legard |
