= Baron Derwent =

Title in the Peerage of the United Kingdom

Baron Derwent, of Hackness in the North Riding of the County of York, is a title in the Peerage of the United Kingdom. It was created on 10 October 1881 for the former Liberal Member of Parliament for Scarborough, Sir Harcourt Vanden-Bempde-Johnstone, 3rd Baronet. His grandson, the third Baron (who succeeded his uncle the second Baron), was an author, poet and minor diplomat. On his death in 1949 the titles passed to his younger brother, the fourth Baron. He served in the Conservative administrations of Harold Macmillan and Sir Alec Douglas-Home as Minister of State for Trade and Minister of State for Home Affairs. As of 2026 the titles are held by his grandson, the sixth Baron, who succeeded in 2026. There is no heirs to the title. The current baron's oldest sister, Emmeline, is signatory to a campaign for women to be able to inherit noble titles, instead of these being restricted to the male line.

The Baronetcy, of Hackness Hall in the North Riding of the County of York, was created in the Baronetage of Great Britain on 6 July 1795 for Richard Vanden-Bempde-Johnstone, with remainder in default of male issue of his own to the male issue of his brother Charles John. He notably represented Weymouth in the House of Commons. Born Richard Johnstone, he was the son of Colonel John Johnstone, second son of Sir William Johnstone, 2nd Baronet, of Westerhall (see Johnstone baronets of Westerhall). His mother was Charlotte, daughter of John van den Bempde of Hackness Hall in Yorkshire.

In February 1793 Richard Johnstone assumed his maternal grandfather's surname of Vanden-Bempde in lieu of Johnstone by an act of Parliament, Bempdé's Name Act 1793 (33 Geo. 3. c. 1 Pr.), but in 1795 he was authorised by royal licence to resume the name of Johnstone in addition to those of Vanden-Bempde. He was succeeded by his son, the second baronet. He sat as Member of Parliament for Yorkshire and Scarborough. On his death the title passed to his son, the aforementioned third baronet, who was elevated to the peerage as Baron Derwent in 1881.

The title of the barony, Derwent (pronounced "Darwent"), is named after the River Derwent in Yorkshire.

== Vanden-Bempde-Johnstone baronets, of Hackness Hall (1795) ==
- Sir Richard Vanden-Bempde-Johnstone, 1st Baronet (died 1807)
- Sir John Vanden-Bempde-Johnstone, 2nd Baronet (1799–1869)
- Sir Harcourt Vanden-Bempde-Johnstone, 3rd Baronet (1829–1916) (created Baron Derwent in 1881)

== Barons Derwent (1881) ==
- Harcourt Vanden-Bempde-Johnstone, 1st Baron Derwent (1829–1916)
- Francis Vanden-Bempde-Johnstone, 2nd Baron Derwent (1851–1929)
- George Harcourt Vanden-Bampde-Johnstone, 3rd Baron Derwent (1899–1949)
- Patrick Robin Gilbert Vanden-Bempde-Johnstone, 4th Baron Derwent (1901–1986)
- Robin Evelyn Leo Vanden-Bempde-Johnstone, 5th Baron Derwent (1930–2026)
- Francis Patrick Harcourt Vanden-Bempde-Johnstone, 6th Baron Derwent (born 1965)

There is no heir to the barony.

The heir presumptive to the baronetcy is Richard Anthony Johnstone-Scott (born 1946).

== See also ==
- Johnstone baronets of Westerhall

Baronetage of Great Britain
Preceded by à Court baronets	Vanden-Bempde-Johnstone baronets of Hackness Hall; 6 July 1795	Succeeded by Hamlyn baronets
