= Sir Hugh Cholmeley, 1st Baronet =

English landowner and Member of Parliament

Sir Hugh Cholmeley, 1st Baronet (22 July 1600 – 20 November 1657) was an English landowner and Member of Parliament who sat in the House of Commons at various times between 1624 and 1643. He was initially a Parliamentarian but later a Royalist leader during the English Civil War. His name is sometimes spelt Cholmley.

== Life ==
Cholmeley was born at Thornton-le-Dale, Yorkshire, the son of Sir Richard Cholmeley and his first wife Susanna Legard, daughter of John Legard of Ganton, Yorkshire (Legard baronets). He was educated at Beverley Free School and Jesus College, Cambridge. In 1624 he was elected one of the members of parliament for Scarborough and was re-elected in 1625 and 1626. He was knighted in 1626. In 1628 he was re-elected a member for Scarborough and sat until 1629, when King Charles I began to rule without parliament for eleven years. In 1622 he had married Elizabeth Twysden, daughter of Sir William Twysden, 1st Baronet of East Peckham, Kent and Anne Finch, by whom he had two sons: William, his eldest son and heir, and Sir Hugh Cholmeley, 4th Baronet, the last of the line.

From 1636 he was Colonel of the Pickering Lythe Trained Band and commanded it during the First Bishops' War. During the years when Charles I ruled without Parliament, Cholmeley became, together with Sir John Hotham, one of the leaders of resistance among the Yorkshire gentry. He organised a number of petitions and protests, and in 1639 he refused to pay ship money. As a result, he was dismissed from all his posts and was summoned before the Council of State, the King reportedly telling Hotham and Cholmeley that if they interfered again he would hang them both.

In April 1640 Cholmeley was again elected a member for Scarborough in the Short Parliament. He was re-elected for Scarborough for the Long Parliament in November 1640 and was created a baronet in 1641.

Initially, a Parliamentarian when the civil war broke out, Cholmeley was one of the parliamentary commissioners sent to negotiate with the King in May 1642; he raised a regiment for the Parliamentary army which fought at the Battle of Edgehill and later joined Fairfax in his campaign against the royalist garrison at York. However, when the Queen landed in Yorkshire, returning from the Netherlands where she had been attempting to raise money and troops, Cholmeley declared for the King, and Newcastle put him in command of all maritime affairs along the northern half of the Yorkshire coast. He was disabled from sitting in parliament in 1643. After the Royalist defeat at the Battle of Marston Moor, Cholmeley refused to flee the country, holding Scarborough for the king during its Great Siege, until he was forced to surrender, on very favourable terms, on 22 July 1645. His estates were sequestrated, but he later compounded for £850.

Cholmeley spend time in exile, until returning to England in 1649. He wrote his memoirs before his death on 30 November 1657. It was addressed to his sons, and intended to "embalm the great virtues and perfections of their mother", who had died two years earlier.

== Sources ==
- D. Brunton & D. H. Pennington, Members of the Long Parliament (London: George Allen & Unwin, 1954)
- J. Foster, Pedigrees of the County Families of Yorkshire
- Major Robert Bell Turton, The History of the North York Militia, now known as the Fourth Battalion Alexandra Princess of Wales's Own (Yorkshire Regiment), Leeds: Whitehead, 1907/Stockton-on-Tees: Patrick & Shotton, 1973, ISBN 0-903169-07-X.

Parliament of England
Preceded by Sir Richard Cholmeley; William Conyers	Member of Parliament for Scarborough; 1624–1629; With: William Conyers 1624–1628; Sir William Constable, Bt 1628–1629	Parliament suspended until 1640
Parliament suspended since 1629	Member of Parliament for Scarborough; 1640–1643; With: John Hotham	Succeeded by Sir Matthew Boynton, 1st Baronet; Luke Robinson
Baronetage of England
New title	Baronet (of Whitby); 1641–1657	Succeeded by William Cholmeley
