= Henry Cholmley (died 1616) =

Member of the Parliament of England

Sir Henry Cholmley or Cholmeley of Roxby in Whitby Strand (1556–1616), was an English Member of Parliament.

He was a son of Sir Richard Cholmley (died 1583) of Whitby, Yorkshire. His mother was Richard Cholmley's second wife, Catherine (died 1598), a daughter of Henry Clifford, 1st Earl of Cumberland. His half-brother, Francis Cholmley died in 1586. Another relation, Marmaduke Cholmley of Brandsby, would challenge him as heir of the Cholmeley estates.

He was educated at Hart Hall, Oxford (by 1568), Jesus College, Cambridge (1573) and Caius College, Cambridge, where he was a fellow commoner in 1573, after which he studied law at Lincoln's Inn in 1577. On the death of his half-brother in 1596 he inherited the family seat at Whitby.

He was elected a Member (MP) of the Parliament of England for Westmorland in 1597, succeeding his elder half-brother. He was knighted in 1603.

Though his wife Margaret was a devout Roman Catholic recusant, the couple converted to Protestantism in 1603. During the 1590s, Margaret Cholmley and his mother allowed Catholic priests to stay at their house in Whitby, which was near the former Whitby Abbey.

Henry Cholmley died at York after a hunting accident in 1616.

== Marriage and children ==
Around 1575, Henry Cholmley married Margaret Babthorpe, daughter of Sir William Babthorpe, a son of Sir William Babthorpe, and Barbara, daughter of Sir Robert Constable), whom he married in about 1575.

Their children included:

- Richard Cholmley (died 1631), his heir, and father of Henry Cholmley (1609–1666)
- Barbara Cholmley (c. 1575 – 28 February 1619) who married Thomas Belasyse, 1st Viscount Fauconberg.
- Two other sons and eight daughters.

== Brandsby family ==
Marmaduke Cholmley and Richard Cholmley of Brandsby were sons of Roger Cholmley, an uncle of Henry Cholmley (died 1616). Marmaduke married Ursula Aslaby. They were recusants. Richard, who married Mary Hungate by Catholic rite before 1607, and harboured Jesuits in November 1609, is associated with travelling players.

Parliament of England
Preceded by Sir William Bowes; Sir Edward Denny	Member of Parliament for Westmorland; 1597–1601; With: Walter Harcourt	Succeeded by George Wharton; Thomas Strickland
