= John Carter (died 1432) =

Member of the Parliament of England

John Carter (died 1432) of Scarborough, Yorkshire, was an English politician.

Carter was probably the son of MP, John Carter.

He was a member (MP) of the parliament of England for Scarborough in 1411, 1420 and May 1421.
