= Patrick Vanden-Bempde-Johnstone, 4th Baron Derwent =

British Baron (1901–1986)

The Right Honourable The Lord Derwent CBE
- Derwent in 1968

Minister of State for Home Affairs
- In office 23 October 1963 – 16 October 1964
- Monarch: Elizabeth II
- Prime Minister: Alec Douglas-Home
- Preceded by: The Earl Jellicoe
- Succeeded by: Alice Bacon

Minister of State for Trade
- In office 6 September 1962 – 23 October 1963
- Monarch: Elizabeth II
- Prime Minister: Harold Macmillan
- Preceded by: Alan Green
- Succeeded by: The Lord Drumalbyn

Member of the House of Lords Lord Temporal
- In office 13 January 1949 – 2 January 1986; Hereditary peerage
- Preceded by: The 3rd Baron Derwent
- Succeeded by: The 5th Baron Derwent

Personal details
- Born: 26 October 1901
- Died: 2 January 1986 (aged 84)
- Party: Conservative

Patrick Robin Gilbert Vanden-Bempde-Johnstone, 4th Baron Derwent, CBE (26 October 1901 – 2 January 1986), was a British peer and Conservative politician.

Derwent was the younger son of Hon. Edward Henry Vanden-Bempde-Johnstone, younger son of Harcourt Vanden-Bempde-Johnstone, 1st Baron Derwent. His mother was Evelyn Mary Agar-Ellis. He was educated at Sandroyd School then Charterhouse School. He succeeded as fourth Baron Derwent on the death of his elder brother, George Harcourt Vanden-Bampde-Johnstone, 3rd Baron Derwent, in 1949 and took his seat in the House of Lords. In September 1962, Derwent was appointed Minister of State for Trade in the Conservative government of Harold Macmillan, and when Alec Douglas-Home became Prime Minister in October 1963 he was promoted to Minister of State for Home Affairs. He retained this post until the Conservative loss in the 1964 general election. He never held ministerial office again but served for many years as a Deputy Speaker in the House of Lords.

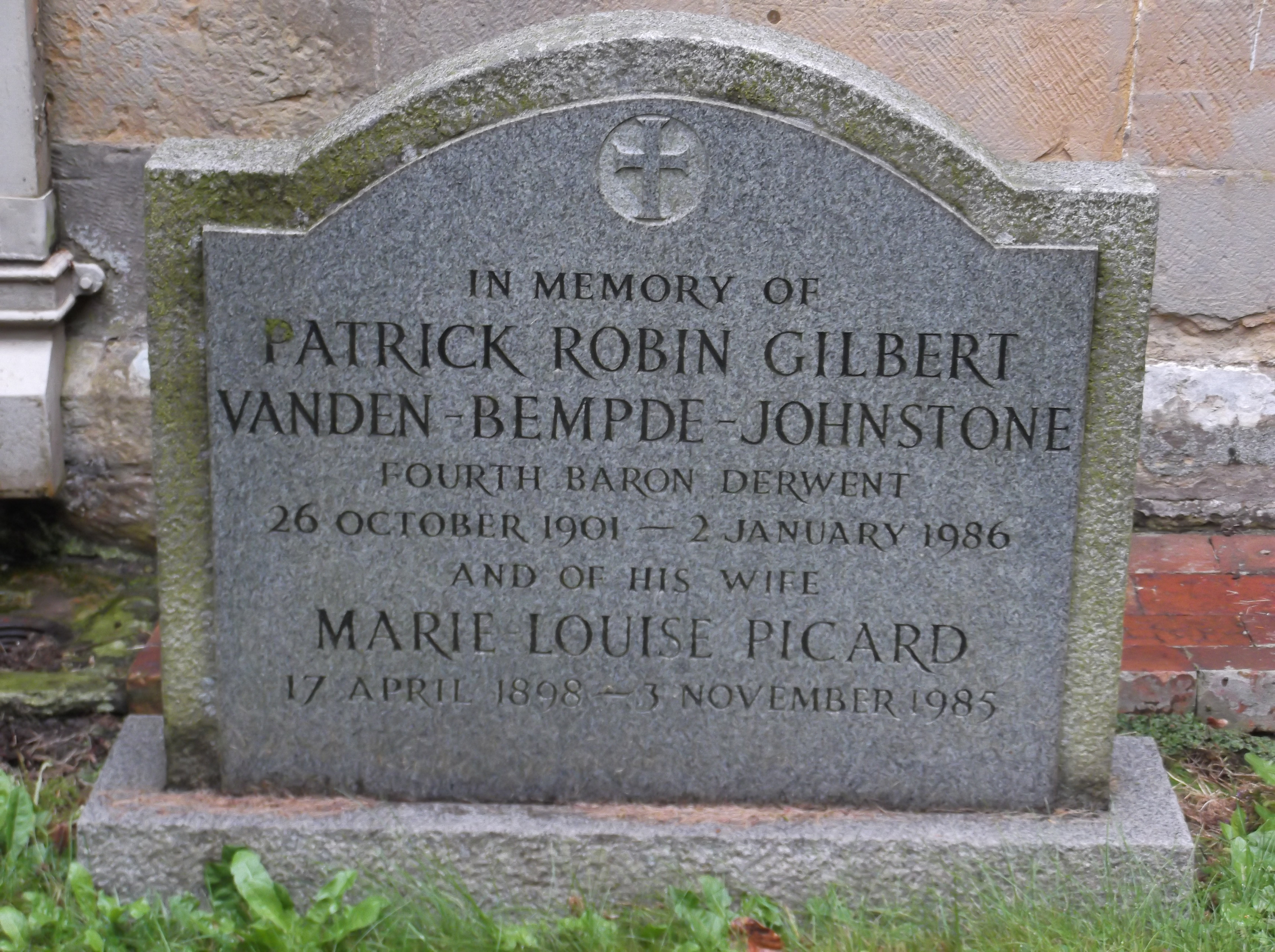
Headstone of the grave of the 4th Baron Derwent and his wife

Lord Derwent married Marie-Louise Henriette Picard, daughter of Albert Picard of Paris, France, in 1929. He died on 2 January 1986, aged 84, and was succeeded in the barony by his son Robin Evelyn Leo Vanden-Bempde-Johnstone.

Political offices
| Preceded by Alan Green | Minister of State for Trade; 1962–1963 | Succeeded by The Lord Drumalbyn |
| Preceded by The Earl Jellicoe | Minister of State for Home Affairs; 1963–1964 | Succeeded by Alice Bacon |
Peerage of the United Kingdom
| Preceded by George Harcourt Vanden- Bampde-Johnstone | Baron Derwent; 1949–1986 | Succeeded by Robin Evelyn Leo Vanden- Bempde-Johnstone |
