= William Thompson (died 1744) =

British Whig politician

William Thompson (c. 1680–1744), of Humbleton, Yorkshire, was a British Whig politician who sat in the House of Commons between 1701 and 1744.

Thompson was the son of Francis Thompson, MP of York and his wife Arabella Alleyn, daughter of Sir Edmund Alleyn, 2nd Baronet, of Hatfield Peverell, Essex. In 1693, he succeeded his father. He matriculated at St John's College, Oxford on 6 July 1695, aged 15.

Once he had come of age, Thompson was returned in a contest as Member of Parliament for Scarborough, the family borough, at the second general election of 1701. He was regularly listed as a Whig, but many of his activities in Parliament cannot be distinguished from those of others named Thompson. He was returned unopposed at the 1702 English general election and in March 1703 he was allowed a pass to travel to Holland. He was a teller for a bill to establish a land registry in Yorkshire on 18 January 1704. At the 1705 English general election, he was returned in a contest at Scarborough. He supported the Court candidate for the Speakership on 25 October and voted for the Court in the proceedings on the regency bill on 18 February 1706. He was returned unopposed at the 1708 British general election. In 1709 he was a teller in two election disputes. He voted for the impeachment of Dr Sacheverell, and on 18 March 1710 and was granted leave of absence for three weeks. At the 1710 British general election he was again returned unopposed. He voted for the 'No Peace Without Spain' motion on 7 December 1711. On 3 May 1712, he was given a further month's leave of absence on grounds of ill-health. He served as a teller against the bill to enclose common land in Yorkshire for church endowments on 5 May 1713, and voted against the French commerce bill on 18 June 1713. At the 1713 British general election, he was returned for Scarborough unopposed. He voted against the expulsion of Richard Steele on 18 March 1714 and told on the Whig side in another disputed election on 27 April 1714.

Thompson was returned for Scarborough unopposed as a Whig at the 1715 British general election and was appointed Governor of Scarborough Castle in 1715 for the rest of his life. In 1718 he was appointed Warden of the Mint and was returned at the ensuing by-election on 5 April 1718. He did not stand in 1722 or 1727. In 1729, he left his post as Warden of the Mint and was appointed Commissioner of the Victualling Office instead. He was returned again as MP for Scarborough at a by-election on 26 January 1730. He was returned again for Scarborough unopposed in 1734 and in 1741. He continued to support the Government as a placeman.

Thompson died unmarried in June 1744.

Parliament of Great Britain
Preceded by Sir Charles Hotham, Bt; The Viscount of Irvine	Member of Parliament for Scarborough; 1701– 1707; With: Sir Charles Hotham, Bt 1701–1702; John Hungerford1702–1705; Robert Squire 1705–1707	Succeeded by Parliament of Great Britain
Parliament of Great Britain
Preceded by Parliament of England	Member of Parliament for Scarborough; 1707–1722; With: John Hungerford	Succeeded by John Hungerford; Sir William Strickland, Bt
Preceded by John Hungerford; Sir William Strickland, Bt	Member of Parliament for Scarborough; 1730–1744; With: Sir William Strickland, Bt 1730–1736; Viscount Dupplin 1736; William Osbaldeston 1736–1744	Succeeded by Edwin Lascelles; William Osbaldeston
Political offices
Preceded by Sir Richard Sandford, 3rd Baronet	Warden of the Mint; 1718–1729	Succeeded by Walter Cary
