= George Phipps =

George Phipps may refer to:

- George Phipps, 2nd Marquess of Normanby, British politician and colonial governor
- George Phipps (rugby union), Irish rugby union player
