= Richard Cholmeley =

Richard Cholmeley may refer to:

- Richard Cholmondeley (1472–1521), or Cholmeley, English farmer, soldier and Lieutenant of the Tower of London
- Richard Cholmeley (died 1631) (1579–1631), English landowner and politician
