= John Hungerford (died 1729) =

John Hungerford (c. 1658 – 8 June 1729) was an English lawyer and Tory politician who sat in the English and British House of Commons between 1692 and 1729. He was legal counsel for the East India Company, and also defended several of those accused of being Jacobites in the years following the rising of 1715.

== Early life ==
Hungerford was the eldest son of Richard Hungerford of Wiltshire and his wife Ann Price, daughter of Ellis Price of Gatcome, Isle of Wight. A claimed connection with the family of Farleigh, according to William Hardy writing in the Dictionary of National Biography, has not been ascertained. He was admitted at Lincoln's Inn on 7 August 1677, graduated Master of Arts (MA) at Cambridge per literas regias in 1683 and was called to the bar in 1687. He married Mary Spooner, daughter of Abraham Spooner, vintner, of London on 5 August 1687.

== Career ==
By 1691 Hungerford was Cursitor of Yorkshire and Westmorland, which may have helped his political ambitions. He was returned as Member of Parliament for Scarborough at a by-election on 28 April 1692. He was very active in Parliament and was appointed chairman of the committee of the house to whom the Orphans Bill was committed. On 23 March 1694 he received from the promoters of the bill a sum of twenty guineas "for his pains and services" in that capacity. This was discovered and his explanation was naïve and unconvincing and he was voted guilty of a ‘high crime and misdemeanour’ and expelled from the House of Commons on 26 March 1695.

Hungerford was defeated at the 1695 English general election when he tried to stand at Scarborough again and also in the second election of 1701. He was returned unopposed in the 1702 English general election, but was defeated at the 1705 English general election. However he was returned as MP for Scarborough at a by-election on 22 November 1707 and was returned unopposed at the 1708 British general election. In December 1709 he introduced a bill to prevent excessive gaming. As a supporter of Dr Sacheverell, he voted afaoinst his impeachment. He was returned again at the 1710 British general election. He was listed as a ‘Tory patriot’ who had opposed the continuation of the war, and a ‘worthy patriot’ who laid open the mismanagements of the previous administration. In 1711 he was appointed one of the commissioners of alienation. He was returned unopposed aa the 1713 British general election. He continued as an active lawyer becoming a bencher of Lincoln's Inn in 1707 and Treasurer in 1713. He was a standing counsel to the East India Company and King's College, Cambridge.

Hungerford was returned unopposed in the elections of 1715, 1722 and 1727. He continued to be very active in parliament, particularly attacking gambling and the army and defending Roman Catholic interests. He defended three persons, Francis Francia (22 January 1717), John Matthews (1719), and Christopher Sayer (1722), who were charged with treasonable relations with the Old Pretender. Francia was acquitted, but Matthews and Sayer were convicted. He was appreciated in Parliament for his eloquence and his humour in defusing heated situations.

== Death and legacy ==
Hungerford died without issue on 8 June 1729. By his will, dated 24 May 1729, and proved by his widow Mary 13 June following, he left bequests to King's College, Cambridge, and to many relatives.

== Notes ==
Parliament of England
Preceded by William Thompson and Francis Thompson	Member of Parliament for Scarborough; 1692–1695; With: Francis Thompson 1689–1693, The Viscount of Irvine 1693–1701	Succeeded by The Viscount of Irvine and Sir Charles Hotham, Bt.
Preceded by Sir Charles Hotham, Bt. and William Thompson	Member of Parliament for Scarborough; 1702–1705; With: William Thompson	Succeeded by Robert Squire and William Thompson
Parliament of Great Britain
Preceded by Robert Squire and William Thompson	Member of Parliament for Scarborough; 1707–1729; With: William Thompson, to 1722; Sir William Strickland, Bt., from 1722	Succeeded by Sir William Strickland, Bt. William Thompson
