= Legard baronets =

Title in the Baronetage of England

Legard baronetcy of Ganton
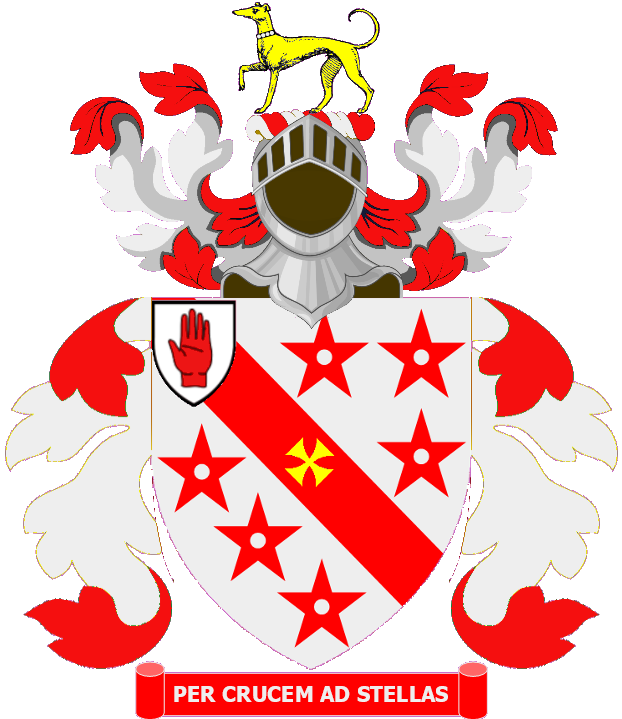
- Blazon Escutcheon: Argent on a bend between six mullets pierced Gules a cross patee Or; Crest: A greyhound passant Or collared Sable studded Argent.
- Creation date: 29 December 1660
- Created by: Charles II
- Peerage: Baronetage of England
- First holder: John Legard
- Present holder: Christopher Legard
- Heir apparent: Benjamin Legard
- Remainder to: the 1st baronet's heirs male
- Status: Extant
- Seats: Scampston Hall, in Malton, North Yorkshire.
- Motto: PER CRUCEM AD STELLAS

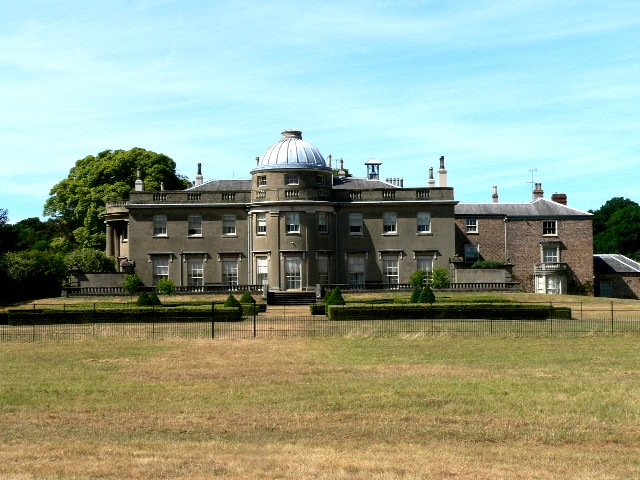
Scampston Hall

The Legard Baronetcy, of Ganton in the County of York, is a title in the Baronetage of England. Since 1959, the family seat has been Scampston Hall, in Malton, North Yorkshire.

The baronetcy was created on 29 December 1660 for John Legard, a Royalist member of the Yorkshire gentry who fought in the Civil War and sat as the Member of Parliament for Scarborough after the Restoration.

== The Legard Family ==
The family has been long-established in North Yorkshire, in the region north-east of York and south of the North York Moors. It is particularly associated with Ganton and can trace a presence there to the 1500s: the baronetcy is identified with Ganton, and Sir John's father, grandfather and great-grandfather were also all from Ganton and were, incidentally, also all called John. Other associated places are concentrated around the eastern part of the old North Riding, along the Vale of Pickering and include Ryedale, Malton, past Ganton, to Scarborough. To the south of this area, there is some association with places in the old East Riding, such as Watton, and Anlaby now on the outskirts of Hull.

The surname is generally pronounced Ledge-yard, but has also been spelled, and pronounced, Le Gard. It is said that this name can be traced to the Norman Conquest. Confusingly, some first names recur in successive generations: the name John was popular for 7 generations in succession. Digby has also been used for 4 generations in succession; both names still recur as additional names, particularly Digby. The name Thomas has also been popular over the generations. Distinctive names used as given names include Digby, Darcy (or D'Arcy) and Anlaby.

== Family members ==
The eleventh Baronet was Chairman of the East Riding of Yorkshire County Council and also represented Scarborough in the House of Commons.

Several other members of the family, all descendants of the fifth Baronet, have also achieved some prominence. They are from two branches:

Descendants of the Reverend William Legard, the fourth son of the fifth Baronet:

- James Anlaby Legard (1805–1869), eldest son of the Reverend William, was a captain in the Royal Navy.
- Sir James Digby Legard KCB (1846–1935), eldest son of James Anlaby, was a colonel in the British Army.
- Alfred Legard (1878–1939), son of Sir James, was another colonel in the British Army and was also a first-class cricketer.
- Percy Legard (1906–1980), grandson of Sir James and nephew of Alfred, was a lieutenant-colonel in the British Army, a Commando leader and an Olympian, in both Summer and Winter disciplines. He competed in the Summer Games of 1932 and 1936 and in the Winter Games of 1936 and 1948. His Summer discipline was the modern pentathlon and the Winter disciplines were, firstly – and uniquely for a British person – the Nordic combined, and then the winter pentathlon.

Descendants of Digby Legard (1766–1797), the sixth son of the fifth Baronet:

- D'Arcy Legard (1873–1953), great-grandson of Digby, was a brigadier-general in the British Army.
- Antony Legard (1912–2004), second son of Brigadier-General D'Arcy, was a major in the British Army in World War II and also played first class cricket for Oxford University and Worcestershire.
- Jonathan Legard (1961-date), grandson of the brigadier-general and nephew of Antony, is a well-known sports journalist with the BBC.
- Bethany Le Gard (1992-date), aka DnBethh, is the 5th great granddaughter of Digby Legard and Francis Creyke. She is a recording artist and performer, with work supported by BBC Introducing. In 2012 she achieved a spot in the nu urban top ten drum&bass download charts with a remix of her vocals in a track named ‘Helio’ and in 2020 hit the top ten National Artists ReverbNation chart with the release of her track Valour.

== The Legard Baronets, of Ganton (1660) ==
- Sir John Legard, 1st Baronet (c. 1631–1678)
- Sir John Legard, 2nd Baronet (1659–1715)
- Sir John Legard, 3rd Baronet (c. 1685–1719)
- Sir Thomas Legard, 4th Baronet (c. 1686–1735), son of the 2nd Baronet
- Sir Digby Legard, 5th Baronet (c. 1730–1773)
- Sir John Legard, 6th Baronet (c. 1758–1807)
- Sir Thomas Legard, 7th Baronet (1762–1830), son of the 5th Baronet
- Sir Thomas Digby Legard, 8th Baronet (1803–1860)
- Sir Francis Digby Legard, 9th Baronet (1833–1865), son of the 8th Baronet
- Sir Darcy Widdrington Legard, 10th Baronet (1843–1866), son of the 8th Baronet
- Sir Charles Legard, 11th Baronet (1846–1901), son of the 8th Baronet
- Sir Algernon Willoughby Legard, 12th Baronet (1842–1923), grandson of the 7th Baronet by Henry Willoughby Legard
- Sir Digby Algernon Hall Legard, 13th Baronet (1876–1961), nephew of the 12th Baronet by Rev. Cecil Henry Legard
- Sir Thomas Digby Legard, 14th Baronet (1905–1984)
- Sir Charles Thomas Legard, 15th Baronet (1938–2025)
- Sir Christopher John Charles Legard, 16th Baronet (born 1964)
