= George Cayley =

British aeronautical engineer (1773–1857)

Sir George Cayley Bt
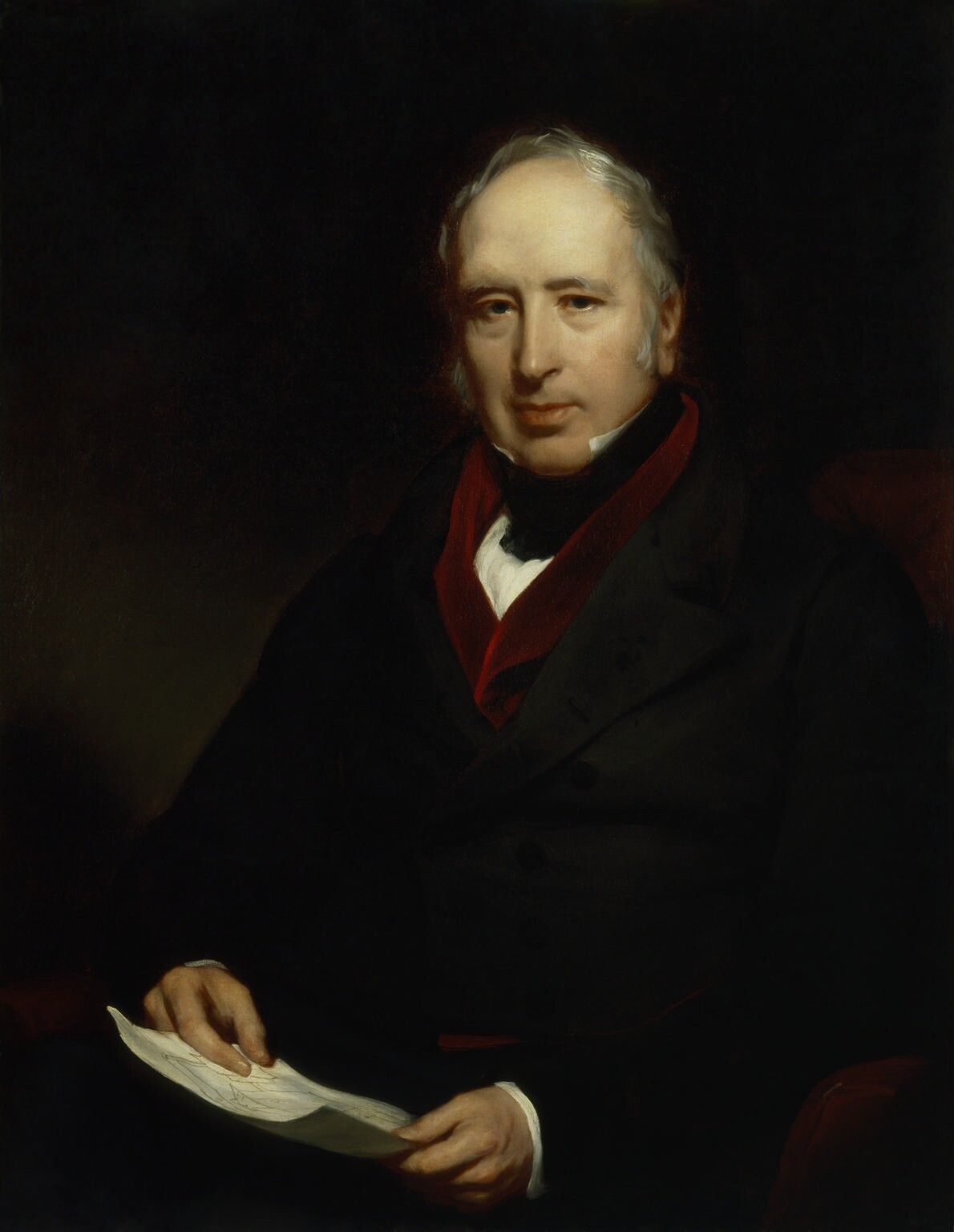
- Portrait by Henry Perronet Briggs, c. 1840
- Born: 27 December 1773; Scarborough, Yorkshire, England
- Died: 15 December 1857 (aged 83); Brompton, Yorkshire, England
- Known for: Designed first successful human glider. Discovered the four aerodynamic forces of flight: weight, lift, drag, thrust; and cambered wings, basis for the design of the modern aeroplane.
- Spouse: Sarah Walker
- Scientific career
- Fields: Aviation, aerodynamics, aeronautics, aeronautical engineering

Sir George Cayley, 6th Baronet (27 December 1773 – 15 December 1857) was an English engineer, inventor and aviator. He was a pioneer of aeronautical engineering and is sometimes referred to as "the father of aviation", designing the first glider reliably reported to carry a human aloft. He is commonly credited as the first person to understand the underlying principles and forces of heavier-than-air flight: weight, lift, drag and thrust. He was also the inventor of the wire wheel.

In 1799, he set forth the concept of the modern aeroplane as a fixed-wing flying machine with separate systems for lift, propulsion and control. Modern aeroplane design is based on those discoveries and on the cambered wings he proposed. He constructed the first flying model aeroplane and also diagrammed the elements of vertical flight. He correctly predicted that sustained flight would not occur until a lightweight engine was developed to provide adequate thrust and lift. The Wright brothers acknowledged his importance to the development of aviation.

Cayley represented the Whig party as Member of Parliament for Scarborough from 1832 to 1835, and in 1838 helped found the UK's first Polytechnic Institute, the Royal Polytechnic Institution (now University of Westminster) and served as its chairman for many years. He was elected as a Vice-President of the Yorkshire Philosophical Society in 1824. He was a founding member of the British Association for the Advancement of Science and was a distant cousin of the mathematician Arthur Cayley.

== General engineering projects ==
Cayley, from Brompton-by-Sawdon near Scarborough, Yorkshire, inherited Brompton Hall, Wydale Hall and other estates on the death of his father, the 5th Baronet. Inspired by the optimism of the times, he engaged in a wide range of engineering projects. Among the many things that he developed are self-righting lifeboats, tension-spoke wheels, the "Universal Railway" (his term for caterpillar tractors), automatic signals for railway crossings, seat belts, small scale helicopters, and a kind of prototypical internal combustion engine fuelled by gunpowder (Gunpowder engine). He suggested that a more practical engine might be made using gaseous vapours rather than gunpowder, thus foreseeing the modern internal combustion engine. He also contributed in the fields of prosthetics, air engines, electricity, theatre architecture, ballistics, optics and land reclamation, and held the belief that these advancements should be freely available.

According to the Institution of Mechanical Engineers, George Cayley was the inventor of the hot air engine in 1807:

The first successfully working hot air engine was Cayley's, in which much ingenuity was displayed in overcoming practical difficulties arising from the high working temperature.

— Institution of Mechanical Engineers

Te Institution also commented on his second hot air engine of 1837 was a forerunner of the internal combustion engine:

In 1837, Sir George Cayley, Bart., Assoc. Inst. C.E., applied the products of combustion from closed furnaces, so that they should act directly upon a piston in a cylinder. Plate No. 9 represents a pair of engines upon this principle, together equal to 8 HP, when the piston travels at the rate of 220 feet per minute.

== Flying machines ==
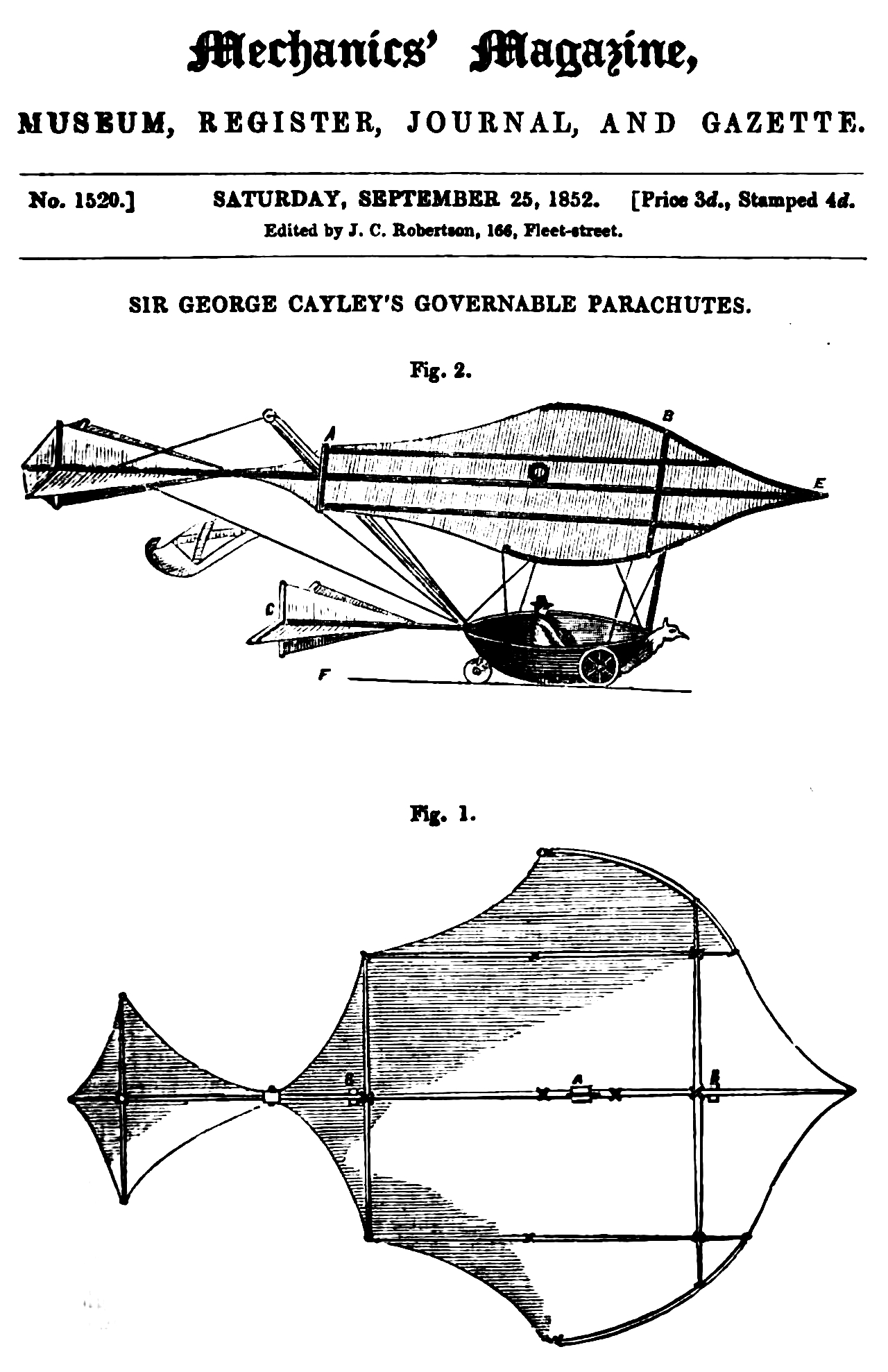
Cayley's glider in Mechanics' Magazine, 1852

Cayley is mainly remembered for his pioneering studies and experiments with flying machines, including the working, piloted glider that he designed and built. He wrote a landmark three-part treatise titled "On Aerial Navigation" (1809–1810), which was published in Nicholson's Journal of Natural Philosophy, Chemistry and the Arts. The 2007 discovery of sketches in Cayley's school notebooks (held in the archive of the Royal Aeronautical Society Library) revealed that even at school Cayley was developing his ideas on the theories of flight. It has been claimed that these images indicate that Cayley identified the principle of a lift-generating inclined plane as early as 1792. To measure the drag on objects at different speeds and angles of attack, he later built a "whirling-arm apparatus", a development of earlier work in ballistics and air resistance. He also experimented with rotating wing sections of various forms in the stairwells at Brompton Hall.

"About 100 years ago, an Englishman, Sir George Cayley, carried the science of flight to a point which it had never reached before and which it scarcely reached again during the last century."

— Wilbur Wright, 1909.

These scientific experiments led him to develop an efficient cambered airfoil and to identify the four vector forces that influence an aircraft: thrust, lift, drag and weight. He discovered the importance of the dihedral angle for lateral stability in flight, and deliberately set the centre of gravity of many of his models well below the wings for this reason; these principles influenced the development of hang gliders. As a result of his investigations into many other theoretical aspects of flight, many now acknowledge him as the first aeronautical engineer. His emphasis on lightness led him to invent a new method of constructing lightweight wheels which is in common use today. For his landing wheels, he shifted the spoke's forces from compression to tension by making them from tightly-stretched string, in effect "reinventing the wheel". Wire soon replaced the string in practical applications and over time the wire wheel came into common use on bicycles, cars, aeroplanes and many other vehicles.

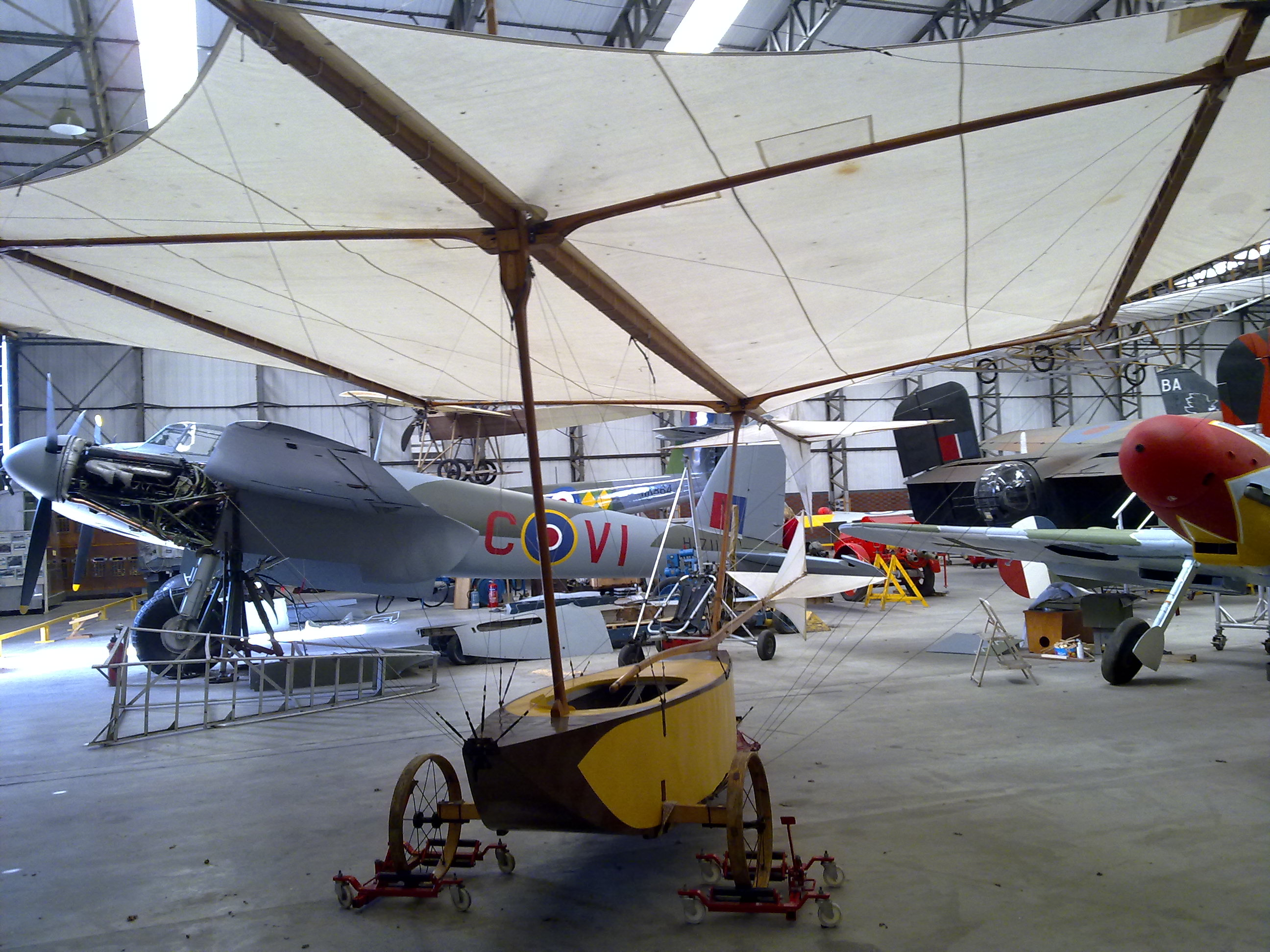
Replica of Cayley's glider at the Yorkshire Air Museum

The model glider successfully flown by Cayley in 1804 had the layout of a modern aircraft, with a kite-shaped wing towards the front and an adjustable tailplane at the back consisting of horizontal stabilisers and a vertical fin. A movable weight allowed adjustment of the model's centre of gravity. In 1843 he was the first to suggest the idea of a convertiplane. At some time before 1849 he designed and built a biplane in which an unknown ten-year-old boy flew. Later, with the continued assistance of his grandson George John Cayley and his resident engineer Thomas Vick, he developed a larger scale glider (also probably fitted with "flappers") which flew across Brompton Dale in front of Wydale Hall in 1853. The first adult aviator has been claimed to be either Cayley's coachman, footman or butler. One source (Gibbs-Smith) has suggested that it was John Appleby, a Cayley employee; however, there is no definitive evidence to fully identify the pilot. An entry in volume IX of the 8th Encyclopædia Britannica of 1855 is the most contemporaneous authoritative account regarding the event. A 2007 biography of Cayley (Richard Dee's The Man Who Discovered Flight: George Cayley and the First Airplane) claims the first pilot was Cayley's grandson George John Cayley (1826–1878).

A replica of the 1853 machine was flown at the original site in Brompton Dale by Derek Piggott in 1973 for TV and in the mid-1980s for the IMAX film On the Wing. The glider is currently on display at the Yorkshire Air Museum.

A second replica of the Cayley Glider was built in 2003 by a team from BAE Systems to commemorate the 150th anniversary of the original flight. Built using modern materials and techniques, the craft was test flown by Alan McWhirter at RAF Pocklington, before being flown by Sir Richard Branson on 5 July 2003 at Brompton Dale, the site of the original glider’s flight. Virgin Atlantic sponsored construction of the replica glider. In 2005, the replica glider was transported and rebuilt in Salina, Kansas, as part of the ground show for the return of the 'round-the-world' Virgin Atlantic GlobalFlyer flight, with the glider being towed by a vehicle along the runway in front of the gathered crowds. Returning to the UK, the replica glider was flown once more for a segment on The One Show. Again towed by a vehicle, the glider undertook its longest and highest flights during the filming and was flown by Dave Holborn. Placed into storage at BAE System's Farnborough site, it was donated to the South Yorkshire Aircraft Museum in 2021 and is now on display.

== Memorial ==
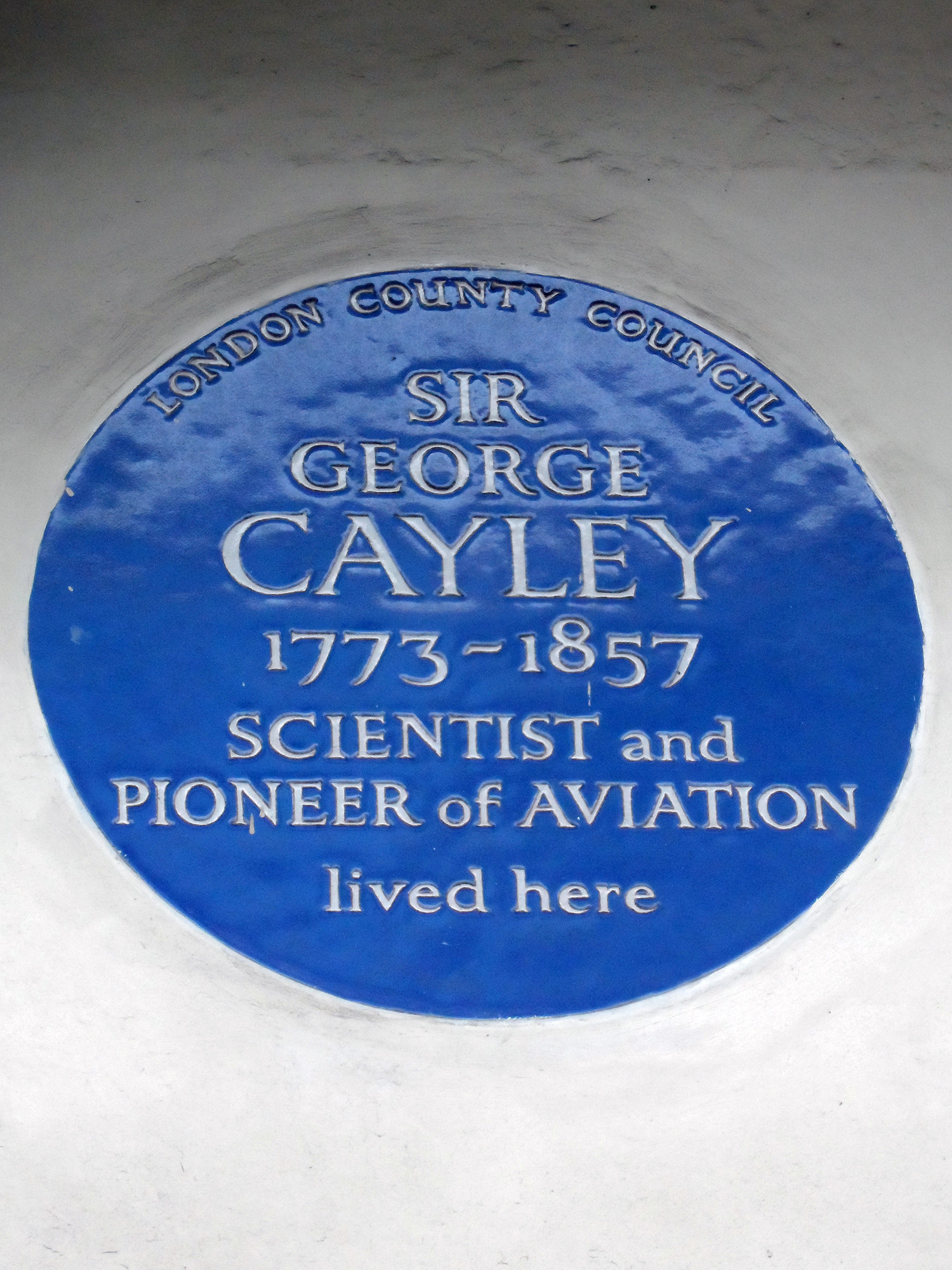
Blue plaque commemorating Cayley in Mayfair, London

Cayley died in 1857 and was buried in the graveyard of All Saints' Church in Brompton-by-Sawdon.

He is commemorated at the University of Hull, Scarborough Campus, where a hall of residence and a teaching building are named after him. He is one of many scientists and engineers commemorated by having a hall of residence and a bar at Loughborough University named after him. The University of Westminster also honours Cayley's contribution to the founding of the institution with a gold plaque at the entrance to its Regent Street building.

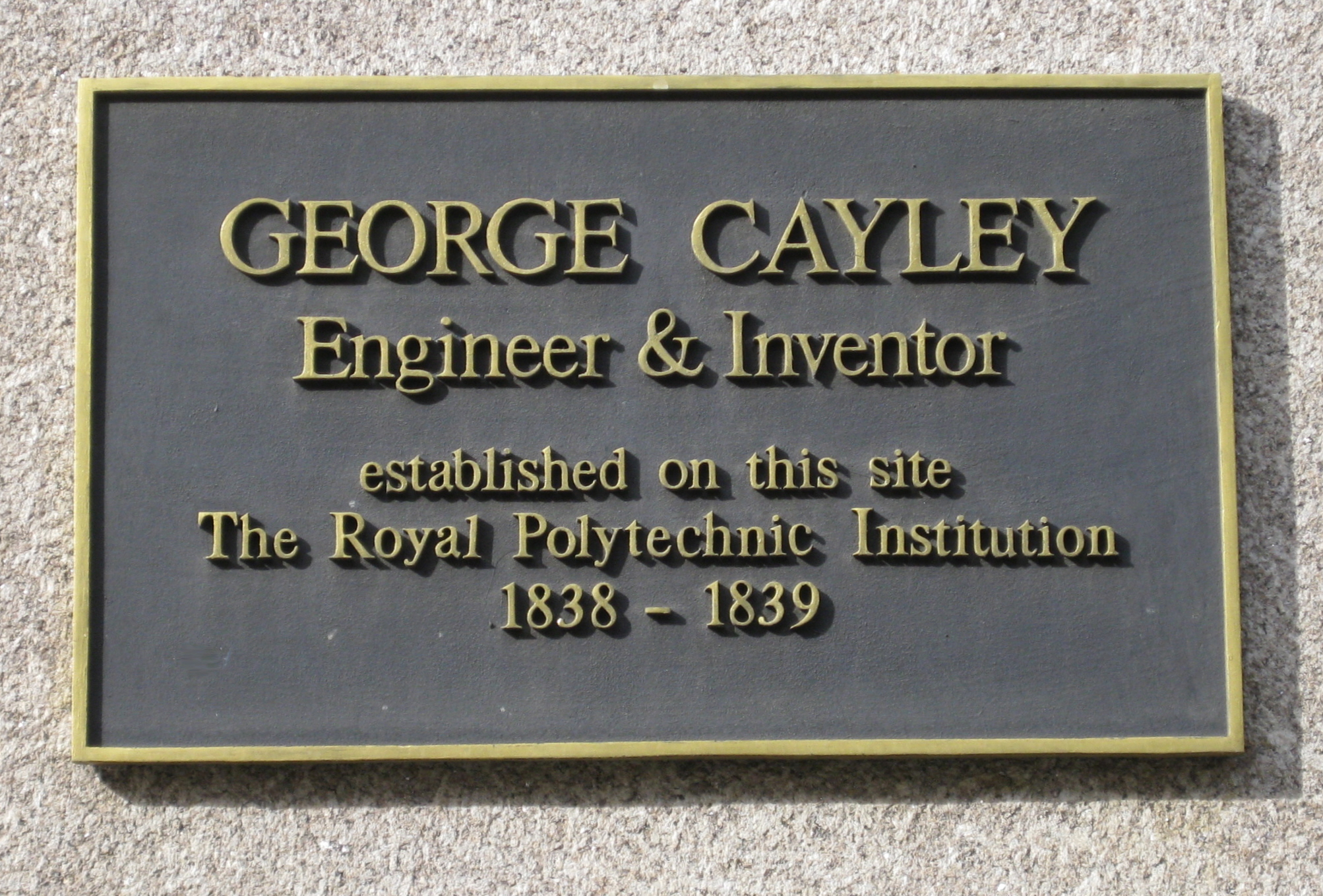
Plaque at 309 Regent Street

There are display boards and a video film at the Royal Air Force Museum London in Hendon honouring Cayley's achievements and a modern exhibition and film "Pioneers of Aviation" at the Yorkshire Air Museum, Elvington, York. The Sir George Cayley Sailwing Club is a North Yorkshire-based free flight club, affiliated to the British Hang Gliding and Paragliding Association, which has borne his name since its founding in 1975.

In 1974, Cayley was inducted into the International Air & Space Hall of Fame.

== Family ==
On 3 July 1795 Cayley married Sarah Walker, daughter of his first tutor George Walker. (J W Clay's expanded edition of Dugdale's Visitation of Yorkshire incorrectly gives the date as 9 July 1795, as does George Cayley's entry in the Oxford Dictionary of National Biography.) They had ten children, of whom three died young. Sarah died on 8 December 1854.

== See also ==
- Early flying machines
- Matthew Piers Watt Boulton
- William Samuel Henson
- Timeline of aviation – 18th century
- Timeline of aviation – 19th century
- Kite types

== Notes ==
Parliament of the United Kingdom
Preceded by Charles Manners-Sutton; Edmund Phipps	Member of Parliament for Scarborough; 1832–1835; With: Sir John Vanden-Bempde-Johnstone, Bt	Succeeded by Sir John Vanden-Bempde-Johnstone, Bt; Sir Frederick Trench
Baronetage of England
Preceded by Thomas Cayley	Baronet (of Brompton); 1792–1857	Succeeded by Digby Cayley
