= Sir Charles Legard, 11th Baronet =

Sir Charles Legard Bt
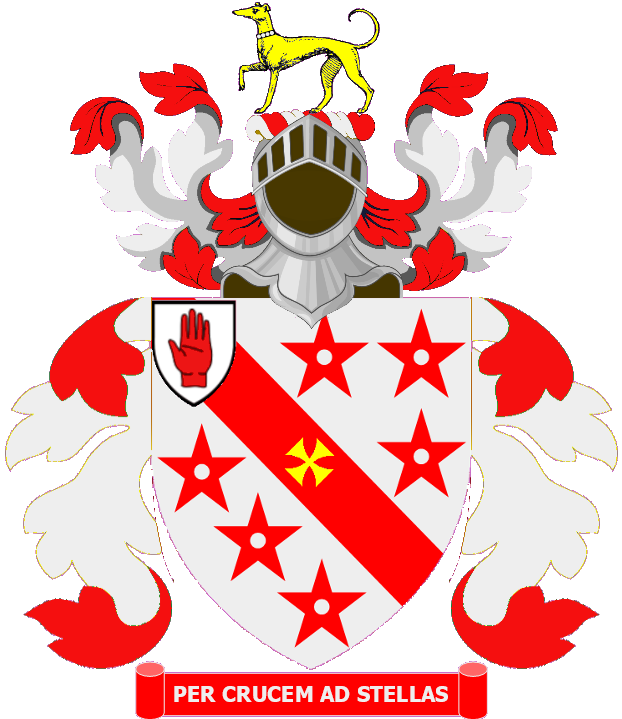
- Sir Charles's armorial achievement

Member of Parliament for Scarborough
- In office 5 February 1874 – 3 April 1880 Serving with Harcourt Vanden-Bempde-Johnstone
- Preceded by: Harcourt Vanden-Bempde-Johnstone; John Dent
- Succeeded by: Harcourt Vanden-Bempde-Johnstone; William Sproston Caine

Personal details
- Born: 2 April 1846
- Died: 6 December 1901 (aged 55)
- Party: Conservative
- Spouse: Frances Emily Hamilton (m. 1878)
- Parent(s): Thomas Digby Legard; Francis Duncombe

Coat of arms of Sir Charles Legard, 11th Baronet

Crest
A greyhound passant Or collared Sable studded Argent.
Escutcheon
Argent on a bend between six mullets pierced Gules a cross patee Or.
Motto
Per Crucem Ad Stellas

Sir Charles Legard, 11th Baronet (2 April 1846 – 6 December 1901) was a Conservative Party politician.

Harris was elected MP for Scarborough in 1874, but was defeated at the next election in 1880.

Legard become the 11th Baronet of Ganton on 12 April 1866, succeeding his brother Darcy Willoughby Legard. On his death in 1901, Algernon Willoughby Legard inherited the title.

During his life, he was also a Deputy Lieutenant and Justice of the Peace.

Parliament of the United Kingdom
Preceded by John Dent; Harcourt Vanden-Bempde-Johnstone	Member of Parliament for Scarborough; 1874–1880; With: Harcourt Vanden-Bempde-Johnstone	Succeeded by Harcourt Vanden-Bempde-Johnstone; William Sproston Caine
Baronetage of England
Preceded by Darcy Willoughby Legard	Baronet (of Ganton); 1836–1885	Succeeded by Algernon Willoughby Legard
