= Alfred Legard =

English cricketer and Army officer

Colonel Alfred Digby Legard, CBE (19 June 1878 – 15 August 1939) was an English Army officer and amateur first-class cricketer, who appeared in two matches for Marylebone Cricket Club (MCC), and another four for Yorkshire County Cricket Club between 1904 and 1910.

Born in Scarborough, Yorkshire, England, Legard was a right-handed batsman, who scored 27 first-class runs at 9.71 with a best of 27. A right-arm slow bowler, he bowled eleven overs without success at a cost of 33 runs.

Legard was commissioned a second lieutenant in the King's Royal Rifle Corps on 18 May 1898, and promoted to lieutenant on 22 October 1899. He served with the 1st Battalion of his regiment in the Second Boer War 1899–1902, where he was present at the Battle of Talana Hill and the Defence of Ladysmith in early 1900, before he took part in operations in Natal in March–June 1900, and in the Transvaal, east of Pretoria, in July–November 1900. He received the Queen's South Africa Medal with four clasps, and was promoted to captain on 14 June 1902. He later served with distinction in World War I, was awarded the CBE and was a colonel of his regiment, the King's Royal Rifle Corps.

He died in August 1939 in Pentire, Newquay, Cornwall.

== See also ==
- Legard Baronets
