= 1869 Scarborough by-election =

UK parliamentary by-election

The 1869 Scarborough by-election occurred on 12 March 1869, due to the death of the incumbent Liberal MP Sir John Vanden-Bempde-Johnstone. It was won by the unopposed Liberal candidate Sir Harcourt Vanden-Bempde-Johnstone.
