= John Dent (Liberal MP) =

British politician (1826–1894)

John Dent Dent (11 June 1826 – 22 December 1894) was a Liberal Party politician in England.

== Biography ==
He was born John Dent Trickett, the eldest son of Leeds merchant Joseph Trickett, who had changed his surname to Dent (his mother's maiden name) in 1834 after inheriting Ribston Hall between Wetherby and Knaresborough in Yorkshire.

John Dent Dent was educated at Eton and Trinity College, Cambridge. He was member of parliament (MP) for Knaresborough from 1852 to 1857, and for Scarborough from 1857 to 1859 and from 1860 to 1874.

From 1880 to 1894 he was Chairman of the North Eastern Railway Company Board of Directors; significantly he took part in the Railway Inspectorate enquiry into the Thirsk Railway Collision of 1892. When Signalman Holmes left the enquiry in tears, it was Dent who followed him out of the room to console him.

Dent had five sons, including the musicologist Edward Joseph Dent.

Parliament of the United Kingdom
| Preceded by Sir John Vanden-Bempde-Johnstone, Bt and Earl of Mulgrave | Member of Parliament for Scarborough; 1857–1859; With: Sir John Vanden-Bempde-Johnstone, Bt | Succeeded by Sir John Vanden-Bempde-Johnstone, Bt; William Denison |
| Preceded by Sir John Vanden-Bempde-Johnstone, Bt and William Denison | Member of Parliament for Scarborough; 1860–1874; With: Sir John Vanden-Bempde-Johnstone, Bt, to 1869; Sir Harcourt Vanden-Bempde-Johnstone, Bt, from 1869 | Succeeded by Sir Harcourt Vanden-Bempde-Johnstone, Bt and Sir Charles Legard, Bt |
Business positions
| Preceded by George Leeman | Chairman of the North Eastern Railway; 1880–1894 | Succeeded by Sir Joseph Whitwell Pease, Bart |
