= Wydale Hall =

House near Brompton-by-Sawdon, North Yorkshire, England

Coordinates: 54.2371°N 0.5776°W

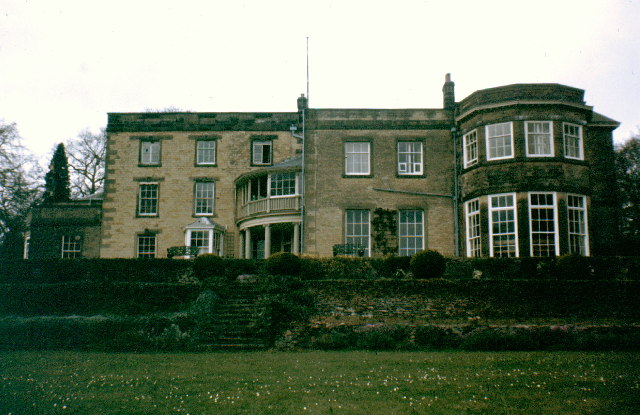
Wydale Hall

Wydale Hall is a Christian Conference centre run by the Diocese of York. The house is located near Brompton-by-Sawdon in the foothills of the North York Moors National Park overlooking the Vale of Pickering. The Hall lies just off the A170, 8.5 miles from Scarborough. Nearby market towns also include Malton (15 miles), Pickering (10 miles), Thornton-le-Dale (7 miles) and Whitby (27 miles). The house dates back to the 18th century, when it was built as a three-storey gentleman's residence, and was extended and enlarged by the Cayley Family in the 19th century.

The property was transferred to the York Diocesan Board of Finance in 1953 to serve as the retreat and conference centre for the diocese.

== History ==
=== The Cayley family ===
The Hall was originally a private house built for the Cayley Family, who also owned other local estates including Brompton Hall. The oldest part of the house (the three-storey section) was built around 1790. Historically the house was associated with the pioneer aviator George Cayley, who inherited the Wydale estate amongst other estates in 1792. The valley to the front of the hall provided the launch site for a number of his early experiments with aviation, starting as early as 1853.

In 1877 the two-storey sections of the house were added, including the main hall and the drawing room (now the Library) and a ballroom.

=== Changes of ownership ===
During the 1900s the house was sold to the Illingworth family. As with many country houses, the hall was utilised as a hospital during the First World War, and it was again utilised as a military centre during the Second World War. First, the hall was used as a base for the Northumberland Hussars and subsequently it became a Defence Platoon HQ. During the final part of the war the house was used to accommodate Italian Prisoners of War. To the east of the house in the wooded areas are the foundation plinths of a number of buildings associated with this period of the hall's history.

=== Religious communities ===
After the Second World War Wydale was leased to the Sisters of the Order of the Holy Paraclete who used the building as a Convent School. Later the sisters developed Wydale as a Retreat Centre offering space for individual and group retreats. During this time the chapel used by the convent was located on the first floor of the 1790s part of the house. A photograph of the chapel at this time is at the hall today.

=== Wydale Hall Trust ===
In December 1952 the ownership of the hall was transferred to the Diocese of York as its retreat and conference centre. During this time the noted York-based architect George Pace was asked to convert the ballroom into a chapel. The hall has also been further extended to increase the size of the former servants' hall to create the current dining room. In 2005 further alterations to the uses of the rooms saw the reinstatement of the principal bedroom (which had been subdivided into three rooms and a bathroom) on the first floor back into one room to serve as a meeting room, and the creation of a new chapel on the ground floor. In the former Ballroom the George Pace fittings were removed (having become very dated) and the glories of the original plasterwork cornices, fireplace and wall panels were revealed.

The mission statement for the Wydale Trust is "To Promote the Mission of the Church of England, within the diocese of York by providing warm, unobtrusive hospitality, in a relaxed and informal atmosphere, where people can work, relax or develop their faith. To be a resource for rest and relaxation, healing and wholeness, safety and service."

=== Buildings today ===
Alongside the main hall (described above) there is a former stable block which has been converted for use by youth groups, called the Emmaus Centre. To the north lies an extensive walled garden along with a glasshouse and garden keeper's cottage. The hall and its buildings are set in 14 acres of woodland and terraced lawns.

== See also ==
- Listed buildings in Snainton
