= Robin Vanden-Bempde-Johnstone, 5th Baron Derwent =

British peer and politician (1930–2026)

Robin Evelyn Leo Vanden-Bempde-Johnstone, 5th Baron Derwent, LVO (30 October 1930 – 21 April 2026) was a British hereditary peer and Conservative politician.

== Life and career ==
Robin Evelyn Leo Vanden-Bempde-Johnstone was born on 30 October 1930, to Patrick Vanden-Bempde-Johnstone, 4th Baron Derwent and Marie-Louise Henriette Picard.

He was a member of the House of Lords from 1986 to 1999.

He was appointed a Lieutenant of the Royal Victorian Order (LVO) following diplomatic service that included Queen Elizabeth II's 1957 State Visit to Paris.

Derwent died on 21 April 2026, aged 95.

Peerage of the United Kingdom
Preceded by Patrick Robin Gilbert; Vanden-Bempde-Johnstone	Baron Derwent; 1986–2026	Succeeded by Francis Patrick Harcourt; Vanden-Bempde-Johnstone
