= John Acclom (14th-century politician) =

Member of the Parliament of England

- Died: 1402
- Occupation: politician

John Acclom (died May or June 1402) was an English politician who served as Member of the English Parliament for Scarborough in 1373, February 1383, November 1384, February 1388, and 1399. He was the father of John Acclom and Robert Acclom, both MPs. He was bailiff of Scarborough from some point before August 1381 to Michaelmas 1382, Michaelmas 1387 to 1388, 1390 to 1393, 1394 to 1396, 1397 to 1399, and 1401 until his death.
