= Robert Bamburgh =

English politician

Robert Bamburgh (fl. 1405–1428) was an English politician. He sat as MP for Scarborough in 1415, 1425 and 1437.

He was the son and heir of Adam Bamburgh (died 1405) by his wife, Alice.
