= Henry Cholmley =

English politician (1609–1666)

Sir Henry Cholmley (1609–1666) was an English politician who sat in the House of Commons at various times between 1641 and 1666. He supported the Parliamentary cause in the English Civil War.

== Biography ==
Cholmley was the second surviving son of Sir Richard Cholmley (died 1631) of Whitby and his first wife Susan Legard, daughter of John Legard, merchant of London and Ganton, Yorkshire. He was baptised on 2 February 1609. He entered Inner Temple in 1628. His father died in 1631, and he travelled abroad in 1633. In 1634, he was expelled from Inner Temple after the Christmas disorders. He was lieutenant-colonel of the Pickering Lythe Trained Band by 1640, when he commanded the regiment on its march towards Scotland after his elder brother Sir Hugh had been dismissed from command.

In January 1641, Cholmley was elected member of parliament for Malton in the Long Parliament. He was knighted on 27 December 1641 and was a J.P. for Yorkshire West Riding from 1642 to 1648. He supported the parliamentary cause and was colonel of foot in the parliamentary army from 1642 to 1644. He was commissioner for levying money for Yorkshire in 1643, commissioner for assessment for the North and West Ridings of Yorkshire from 1644 to 1648 and commissioner for the northern association (North and West Ridings) and commissioner for regulating excise in 1645. In 1646 he was commissioner for abuses in heraldry and commissioner for exclusion from sacrament. He was commissioner for scandalous offences in 1648 and also commissioner for militia in Yorkshire. He was colonel of foot in the parliamentary army and directed the siege of Pontefract. In December 1648 he was secluded from parliament under Pride's Purge.

By the end of the interregnum, he had become a Royalist and supported Thomas Fairfax, 3rd Lord Fairfax of Cameron, in overthrowing the military junta. He was arrested by order of the restored Rump Parliament on 18 February 1660 but three days later he returned to the House of Commons when the secluded Members were readmitted. He was commissioner for militia for Yorkshire from March 1660, a JP for Yorkshire and Westmorland from March to July 1660 and a JP for the North and West Ridings of Yorkshire from March 1660 to his death.

In April 1660, Cholmley was elected MP for Appleby in the Convention Parliament. He was colonel of foot from June to October 1660, commissioner for oyer and terminer on the Northern circuit in July 1660 and commissioner for assessment for North and West Ridings from August 1660 to 1661. In 1661 he became commissioner for assessment for the North Riding and deputy lieutenant for North Riding until his death. In 1666 he was persuaded to deputise for his nephew, Sir Hugh Cholmley, in superintending harbour works at Tangier. However, the deputy governor, Henry Norwood, found his excessive zeal and uncontrollable temper intolerable. He died in Tangier a few months later and his body was brought home for burial in his private chapel at West Newton Grange on 30 June 1666.

== Family ==
Cholmley married in about 1638 Lady Katharine Twisleton, widow of Sir George Twisleton, 1st Baronet of Barley, and daughter of Henry Stapleton of Wighill. They had two sons, Hugh (1642 – 7 January 1674) and Richard (15 September 1643 – before June 1672) and a daughter Henrietta Catherine (24 May 1645 – 25 June 1680) who married Sir John Tempest of Tong, Bracewell, Yorkshire and had issue. He was the brother of Sir Hugh Cholmeley, 1st Baronet.

Parliament of England
| New constituency | Member of Parliament for Malton; 1641–1648; With: Thomas Hebblethwaite; Richard Darley | Succeeded by Richard Darley |
