= William Seamer =

English politician

William Seamer (died 1402), of Scarborough, Yorkshire, was an English politician.

He was a member (MP) of the parliament of England for Scarborough in 1378 and 1386.
