= Robert Acclom =

Member of the Parliament of England

Robert Acclom was an English politician who was MP for Scarborough in 1401 and October 1404. He was the son of John Acclom.
