= John Carter (died 1408) =

English politician

John Carter (died 1408) of Scarborough, Yorkshire, was an English politician.

He was a member (MP) of the parliament of England for Scarborough in 1386, September 1388, 1391 and January 1397.
