= Scarborough (constituency) =

UK Parliament constituency (1974–1997)

- Former county constituency for the House of Commons
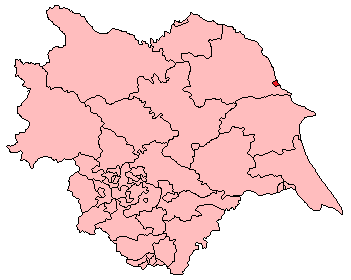
- Scarborough in Yorkshire, 1885–1918
- County: North Yorkshire
- Major settlements: Scarborough, Whitby

February 1974–1997
- Seats: One
- Created from: Scarborough and Whitby
- Replaced by: Scarborough and Whitby

1295–1918
- Seats: Two (1295–1885); One (1885–1918)
- Type of constituency: Borough constituency

Scarborough was the name of a constituency in Yorkshire, electing Members of Parliament to the House of Commons, at two periods. From 1295 until 1918 it was a parliamentary borough consisting only of the town of Scarborough, electing two MPs until 1885 and one from 1885 until 1918. In 1974 the name was revived for a county constituency, covering a much wider area; this constituency was abolished in 1997.

== Boundaries ==
1974–1983: The Borough of Scarborough, the Urban Districts of Pickering and Scalby, and the Rural Districts of Pickering and Scarborough.

1983–1997: The Borough of Scarborough wards of Ayton, Castle, Cayton, Central, Danby, Derwent, Eastfield, Eskdaleside, Falsgrave, Fylingdales, Lindhead, Mayfield, Mulgrave, Newby, Northstead, Scalby, Seamer, Streonshalh, Weaponness, and Woodlands.

== History ==
Scarborough was first represented in a Parliament held at Shrewsbury in 1282, and was one of the boroughs sending 2 MPs to the Model Parliament of 1295 which is now generally considered to be the first parliament in the modern sense.

Until the Great Reform Act 1832 Scarborough was a corporation borough, the right of election resting solely with the 44-member corporation or "common council". At an earlier period, it seems to have been a matter of some dispute whether the freemen of the borough could also vote, but at an election in 1736 the corporation and the (much more numerous) freemen backed different candidates. The candidate of the freemen was returned to Parliament, but on petition from his defeated opponent the House of Commons decided that only the corporation votes should stand, and overturned the result. In later days the corporation was entirely under the influence of the Duke of Rutland and Earl of Mulgrave, who each nominated one of the Members of Parliament; by 1832, Scarborough had continuously been represented by junior members of their respective families for more than half a century. The restriction on the franchise was challenged in 1791, and Parliament declared in favour of "the ancient right of inhabitant householders" in the borough to vote, but the decision seems to have been a dead-letter for at the election of 1802, the last to be contested before the Reform Act 1832, only 33 voters cast their votes.

At the time of the Reform Act 1832, the borough had a population of about 8,760 in just over 2,000 houses, and the act left its boundaries and two members intact, though widening the franchise. (There were 431 electors registered at the 1832 election.) The constituency remained broadly unchanged until 1918, though from 1885 its representation was reduced from two MPs to one.

Following abolition in 1918, the constituency was absorbed into the new Scarborough and Whitby county constituency. However, the boundary changes which came into effect at the February 1974 general election created a new constituency named Scarborough. This was a county constituency including, in addition to Scarborough itself and its suburb Scalby, the town of Pickering and the Scarborough and Pickering rural districts.

There were further boundary changes at the 1983 general election, which brought in Whitby and its surrounding area in place of the Pickering district. The constituency was abolished once more for the 1997 general election, when it was again largely replaced by a new Scarborough and Whitby constituency.

== Members of Parliament ==
- Constituency created (1295)

=== MPs 1295–1540 ===
| Parliament | First member | Second member |
|---|---|---|
| 1298 | John Roston | Robert Pau |
| 1301 | John Pickford | John Hammond |
| 1305 | Robert de Coroner | John Hammond |
| 1306 | John Semer | John Hammond |
| 1307 | Amaury Gegg | Robert Wawayn |
| 1308 | Radus Gegg | John Gegg |
| 1310 | Roger Oughtred | John de Cropton |
| 1313 | Roger Oughtred | John de Cropton |
| 1314 | Roger Oughtred | Thomas de Cropton |
| 1315 | Roger Oughtred | John Huterburgh |
| 1319 | Evericus Godge | William de St Thomas |
| 1321 | Adam de Seamer | Henry de Roston |
| 1327 | Henry de Roston | Robert de Hubthorpe |
| 1327 | Henry de Newcastle | John de Bergh |
| 1328 | Robert the Coroner | John le Skyron |
| 1328 | Henry de Newcastle | William de Hedon |
| 1329 | Henry de Newcastle | William de Hedon |
| 1330 | Philip Humbury | John le Serjeant |
| 1332 | Henry the Coroner | Henry de Roston |
| 1333 | Henry the Coroner | Henry de Roston |
| 1334 | Robert de Helperthorpe | Henry the Coroner |
| 1335 | Henry de Newcastle | William de Bedale |
| 1335 | Richard de Willsthorpe | John de Mounte Pesselers |
| 1336 | Thomas le Blound | Henry de Newcastle |
| 1337 | Henry de Newcastle | Thomas the Coroner |
| 1338 | Henry de Roston | Henry de Newcastle |
| 1339 | Henry de Roston | Henry de Newcastle |
| 1340 | Henry de Roston | Robert the Coroner |
| 1346 | William de Kilham | John de Ireland |
| 1347 | Robert Scardeburgh | William Cutt |
| 1348 | Robert Scardeburgh | William son of Roger |
| 1351 | John Beaucola | Henry de Roston |
| 1354 | Henry de Roston | Richard de Newcastle |
| 1356 | John Burniston | William Barton |
| 1358 | Robert the Coroner | John Hammund |
| 1359 | Henry Roston | Peter Percy |
| 1360 | Richard de Newcastle | Peter Percy |
| 1361 | Peter Percy | John del Aumery |
| 1362 | Edward Thwailes | ? |
| 1365 | Richard del Kichen | Richard Chelman |
| 1368 | Stephen Carter | Henry de Roston |
| 1369 | Robert Aclom | John de Barton |
| 1373 | William Cobberiham | John Acclom |
| 1376 | John de Stolwich | Henry de Roston |
| 1378 | William de Seamer | John de Moresham, jnr |
| 1379 | Henry de Roston | Thomas de Brune |
| 1382 | Henry de Roston | John Acclom |
| 1383 | John Stockwich | Richard Chelman |
| 1384 | John Acclom | Henry de Roston |
| 1385 | Robert Martyn | John de Moresham |
| 1386 | William de Seamer | John Carter |
| 1388 (Feb) | Willam Sage | John Acclom |
| 1388 (Sep) | John Folkton | John Carter |
| 1390 (Jan) | | |
| 1390 (Nov) | | |
| 1391 | John Carter | |
| 1392 | John Carter | John Martyn |
| 1393 | Robert de Alnwick | John de Moresham, jnr |
| 1394 | Robert Shilbottle | William Carter |
| 1395 | Henry de Harom | Robert Shillbottle |
| 1397 (Jan) | John Carter | William Percy |
| 1397 (Sep) | | |
| 1400 | John Acclom | William Harom |
| 1401 | John Mosdale | Robert Aclom |
| 1402 | Thomas Carethorp | William Harom |
| 1404–5 (Jan) | John Mosdale | William Sage |
| 1404–4 (Sep) | John Mosdale | Robert Aclom |
| 1406 | William Percy | William Harom |
| 1407 | William Stapleton | William Carter |
| 1410 | | |
| 1411 | John Mosdale | William Sage John Carter |
| 1412–3 (Feb) | | |
| 1413 (May) | Thomas Carethorp | John Mosdale |
| 1414 (Apr) | | |
| 1414 (Nov) | John Mosdale | William Sage |
| 1415 | Robert Bamburgh | George Topcliffe |
| 1415–6 (Mar) | Thomas Carethorp | Roger de Stapelton |
| 1416 (Oct) | | |
| 1417 | | |
| 1419 | William Forster | William Sage |
| 1420 | John Carter | Thomas Copeland |
| 1421 (May) | John Carter | William Sage |
| 1421 (Dec) | John Acclom | William Forster |
| 1422 | Hugo Raysyn | William Forster |
| 1423 | William Forster | Jack Daniell |
| 1425 | Robert Bambergh | William Forster |
| 1426 | John Acclom | |
| 1428 | John Danyell | William Forster |
| 1429 | John Danyell | William Forster |
| 1432 | William Forster | Jack Daniell |
| 1442 | William Forster | Robert Carethorp |
| 1447 | William Helperby | John Aclom |
| 1449 | Henry Eyre | William Paulin |
| 1450 | John Aclom | Robert Benton |
| 1451 | George Topcliff | Thomas Benton |
| 1455 | Jack Daniell | Robert Hoggson |
| 1460 | John Sherrifle | Thomas Hoggson |
| 1467 | John Paulin | John Robinson |
| 1510–1523 | No names known | |
| 1529 | Sir Ralph Ellerker | George Flinton |
| 1536 | ? | |
| 1539 | ? | |

=== MPs 1542–1640 ===
| Parliament | First member | Second member |
|---|---|---|
| Parliament of 1542–1544 | Sir Ralph Eure | Sir Nicholas Fairfax |
| Parliament of 1545–1547 | Reginald Beseley | William Lockwood |
| Parliament of 1547–1552 | Richard Whaley | Reginald Beseley |
| First Parliament of 1553 | Thomas Eyns | General Dakins |
| Second Parliament of 1553 | John Tregonwell | Leonard Chamberlain |
| Parliament of 1554 | Anthony Brann | Robert Massey |
| Parliament of 1554–1555 | Reginald Beseley | Tristram Cook |
| Parliament of 1555 | William Hasye | Francis Aislabie |
| Parliament of 1558 | Richard Jones | Edward Beseley |
| Parliament of 1559 | William Strickland | Sir Henry Gates |
| Parliament of 1563–1567 | William Strickland | Sir Henry Gates |
| Parliament of 1571 | William Strickland | Edward Gate |
| Parliament of 1572–1583 | Sir Henry Gates | Edward Carey |
| Parliament of 1584–1585 | William Strickland | John Hotham |
| Parliament of 1586–1587 | Sir Ralph Bourchier | Edward Hutchinson |
| Parliament of 1588–1589 | Edward Gates | William Fish |
| Parliament of 1593 | Edward Gates | Roger Dalton |
| Parliament of 1597–1598 | Sir Thomas Posthumous Hoby | Walter Pye |
| Parliament of 1601 | Edward Stanhope | William Eure |
| Parliament of 1604–1611 | Sir Thomas Posthumous Hoby | Francis Eure |
| Addled Parliament (1614) | Edward Smith | William Conyers |
| Parliament of 1621–1622 | Sir Richard Cholmeley | William Conyers |
| Happy Parliament (1624–1625) | (Sir) Hugh Cholmeley | William Conyers |
| Useless Parliament (1625) | (Sir) Hugh Cholmeley | William Thompson |
| Parliament of 1625–1626 | (Sir) Hugh Cholmeley | Stephen Hutchinson |
| Parliament of 1628–1629 | Sir William Constable | John Harrison |
No Parliament summoned 1629–1640

=== MPs 1640–1885 ===
| Election | First member | First party | Second member | Second party |
|---|---|---|---|---|
| April 1640 | John Hotham the younger | Royalist | Sir Hugh Cholmeley | |
| November 1640 | John Hotham the younger | Royalist | Sir Hugh Cholmeley | |
| April 1642 | John Hotham the younger | Royalist | Cholmley disabled to sit – seat vacant | |
| September 1643 | Hotham disabled to sit – seat vacant | | Cholmley disabled to sit – seat vacant | |
| 1645 | Luke Robinson | | Sir Matthew Boynton, Bt. (d. March 1647) | |
| 1647 | Luke Robinson | | John Anlaby | |
| 1653 | Scarborough was unrepresented in the Barebones Parliament | | | |
| 1654 | John Wildman | | Scarborough had only one seat in the First and Second Parliaments of the Protectorate | |
| 1656 | Colonel Edward Salmon | | Scarborough had only one seat in the First and Second Parliaments of the Protectorate | |
| January 1659 | Colonel Edward Salmon | | Thomas Chaloner | |
| May 1659 | Luke Robinson | | One seat vacant | |
| April 1660 | Luke Robinson | | John Legard | |
| June 1660 | Luke Robinson | | William Thompson | |
| July 1660 | John Legard | | William Thompson | |
| 1661 | Sir Jordan Crosland | | William Thompson | |
| 1670 | Sir Philip Monckton | | William Thompson | |
| 1679 | Francis Thompson | | William Thompson | |
| 1685 | Sir Thomas Slingsby, Bt | | William Osbaldeston | |
| 1689 | William Thompson | | Francis Thompson | |
| 1692 | John Hungerford | | Francis Thompson | |
| 1693 | John Hungerford | | The Viscount of Irvine | |
| 1695 | Sir Charles Hotham, Bt | Court Whig | The Viscount of Irvine | |
| 1701 | Sir Charles Hotham, Bt | Court Whig | William Thompson | |
| 1702 | John Hungerford | Tory | William Thompson | |
| 1705 | Robert Squire | | William Thompson | |
| 1707 | John Hungerford | Tory | William Thompson | |
| 1722 | John Hungerford | Tory | Sir William Strickland, Bt | Whig |
| 1730 | William Thompson | | Sir William Strickland, Bt | Whig |
| January 1736 | William Thompson | | Viscount Dupplin | |
| April 1736 | William Thompson | | William Osbaldeston | |
| 1744 | Edwin Lascelles | | William Osbaldeston | |
| 1747 | Edwin Lascelles | | Roger Handasyde | |
| 1754 | Sir Ralph Milbanke, Bt | | William Osbaldeston | |
| 1761 | John Major | | William Osbaldeston | |
| 1766 | John Major | | Fountayne Wentworth Osbaldeston | |
| 1768 | George Manners | | Fountayne Wentworth Osbaldeston | |
| 1770 | George Manners | | Sir James Pennyman, Bt | |
| 1772 | The Earl of Tyrconnel | Tory | Sir James Pennyman, Bt | |
| 1774 | The Earl of Tyrconnel | Tory | Sir Hugh Palliser, Bt | |
| 1779 | The Earl of Tyrconnel | Tory | Charles Phipps | |
| 1784 | The Earl of Tyrconnel | Tory | George Osbaldeston | |
| 1790 | The Earl of Tyrconnel | Tory | Hon Henry Phipps | Tory |
| 1794 | The Earl of Tyrconnel | Tory | Hon. Edmund Phipps | Tory |
| 1796 | Lord Charles Somerset | Tory | Hon. Edmund Phipps | Tory |
| 1802 | Lord Robert Manners | Tory | Hon. Edmund Phipps | Tory |
| 1806 | Charles Manners Sutton | Tory | Hon. Edmund Phipps | Tory |
| 1818 | Charles Manners Sutton | Tory | Viscount Normanby | Whig |
| 1820 | Charles Manners Sutton | Tory | Hon Edmund Phipps | Tory |
| 1832 | Sir John Vanden-Bempde-Johnstone, Bt | Whig | Sir George Cayley, Bt | Whig |
| 1835 | Sir John Vanden-Bempde-Johnstone, Bt | Conservative | Sir Frederick Trench | Conservative |
| 1837 | Sir Thomas Style, Bt | Whig | Sir Frederick Trench | Conservative |
| 1841 | Sir John Vanden-Bempde-Johnstone, Bt | Conservative | Sir Frederick Trench | Conservative |
| 1847 | Sir John Vanden-Bempde-Johnstone, Bt | Peelite | Earl of Mulgrave | Whig |
| 1851 | Sir John Vanden-Bempde-Johnstone, Bt | Peelite | George Frederick Young | Conservative |
| 1852 | Sir John Vanden-Bempde-Johnstone, Bt | Peelite | Earl of Mulgrave | Whig |
| 1857 | Sir John Vanden-Bempde-Johnstone, Bt | Peelite | John Dent | Whig |
| 1859 | Sir John Vanden-Bempde-Johnstone, Bt | Liberal | William Denison | Liberal |
| 1860 | Sir John Vanden-Bempde-Johnstone, Bt | Liberal | John Dent | Liberal |
| 1869 | Sir Harcourt Vanden-Bempde-Johnstone, Bt | Liberal | John Dent | Liberal |
| 1874 | Sir Harcourt Vanden-Bempde-Johnstone, Bt | Liberal | Sir Charles Legard, Bt | Conservative |
| 1880 | Sir Harcourt Vanden-Bempde-Johnstone, Bt | Liberal | William Sproston Caine | Liberal |
| 1880 | John George Dodson | Liberal | William Sproston Caine | Liberal |
| 1884 | Richard Steble | Liberal | William Sproston Caine | Liberal |

- Representation reduced to one member (1885)

=== MPs 1885–1918 ===
| Election | Member | Party |
|---|---|---|
| 1885 | Sir George Sitwell | Conservative |
| 1886 | Joshua Rowntree | Liberal |
| 1892 | Sir George Sitwell | Conservative |
| 1895 | Joseph Compton-Rickett | Liberal |
| 1906 | Walter Rea | Liberal |
| 1918 | constituency abolished | |

=== MPs 1974–1997 ===
| Election | Member | Party |
|---|---|---|
| 1974 | Sir Michael Shaw | Conservative |
| 1992 | John Sykes | Conservative |
| 1997 | constituency abolished | |

== Elections 1640–1885 ==
=== Elections in the 1830s ===
General election 1830: Scarborough (2 seats)
| Party | Candidate | Votes | % |
|---|---|---|---|
| Speaker | Charles Manners-Sutton | Unopposed | |
| Tory | Edmund Phipps | Unopposed | |
| Registered electors | | 36 | |
| Speaker hold | | | |
| Tory hold | | | |

General election 1831: Scarborough (2 seats)
| Party | Candidate | Votes | % |
|---|---|---|---|
| Speaker | Charles Manners-Sutton | Unopposed | |
| Tory | Edmund Phipps | Unopposed | |
| Registered electors | | 36 | |
| Speaker hold | | | |
| Tory hold | | | |

General election 1832: Scarborough (2 seats)
| Party | Candidate | Votes | % |
|---|---|---|---|
| Whig | John Vanden-Bempde-Johnstone | 285 | 41.6 |
| Whig | George Cayley | 255 | 37.2 |
| Tory | Frederick Trench | 145 | 21.2 |
| Majority | | 110 | 16.0 |
| Turnout | | 384 | 89.1 |
| Registered electors | | 431 | |
| Whig gain from Speaker | | | |
| Whig gain from Tory | | | |

General election 1835: Scarborough (2 seats)
| Party | Candidate | Votes | % | ±% |
|---|---|---|---|---|
| Conservative | Frederick Trench | 176 | 38.3 | +17.1 |
| Whig | John Vanden-Bempde-Johnstone | 161 | 35.1 | −6.5 |
| Whig | George Cayley | 122 | 26.6 | −10.6 |
| Turnout | | 267 | 64.8 | −24.3 |
| Registered electors | | 412 | | |
| Majority | | 54 | 11.7 | N/A |
| Conservative gain from Whig | | Swing | +17.1 | |
| Majority | | 39 | 8.5 | −7.5 |
| Whig hold | | Swing | −7.5 | |

General election 1837: Scarborough (2 seats)
| Party | Candidate | Votes | % | ±% |
|---|---|---|---|---|
| Conservative | Frederick Trench | 225 | 35.8 | −2.5 |
| Whig | Sir Thomas Style, 8th Baronet | 211 | 33.6 | +7.0 |
| Conservative | John Vanden-Bempde-Johnstone | 192 | 30.6 | −4.5 |
| Turnout | | 423 | 86.7 | +21.9 |
| Registered electors | | 488 | | |
| Majority | | 14 | 2.2 | −1.0 |
| Conservative hold | | Swing | −3.0 | |
| Majority | | 19 | 3.0 | −5.5 |
| Whig hold | | Swing | +7.0 | |

=== Elections in the 1840s ===
General election 1841: Scarborough (2 seats)
| Party | Candidate | Votes | % | ±% |
|---|---|---|---|---|
| Conservative | John Vanden-Bempde-Johnstone | 296 | 37.7 | +7.1 |
| Conservative | Frederick Trench | 253 | 32.2 | −3.6 |
| Whig | Charles Beaumont Phipps | 237 | 30.2 | −3.4 |
| Majority | | 16 | 2.0 | −0.2 |
| Turnout | | 510 | 90.4 | +3.7 |
| Registered electors | | 564 | | |
| Conservative hold | | Swing | +4.4 | |
| Conservative gain from Whig | | Swing | −1.0 | |

General election 1847: Scarborough (2 seats)
| Party | Candidate | Votes | % | ±% |
|---|---|---|---|---|
| Peelite | John Vanden-Bempde-Johnstone | Unopposed | | |
| Whig | George Phipps | Unopposed | | |
| Registered electors | | 670 | | |
| Peelite gain from Conservative | | | | |
| Whig gain from Conservative | | | | |

=== Elections in the 1850s ===
Phipps was appointed Comptroller of the Household, requiring a by-election.

By-election, 19 July 1851: Scarborough (1 seat)
| Party | Candidate | Votes | % | ±% |
|---|---|---|---|---|
| Conservative | George Frederick Young | 314 | 52.8 | N/A |
| Whig | George Phipps | 281 | 47.2 | N/A |
| Majority | | 33 | 5.6 | N/A |
| Turnout | | 595 | 80.1 | N/A |
| Registered electors | | 743 | | |
| Conservative gain from Whig | | Swing | N/A | |

General election 1852: Scarborough (2 seats)
| Party | Candidate | Votes | % | ±% |
|---|---|---|---|---|
| Peelite | John Vanden-Bempde-Johnstone | 422 | 37.6 | N/A |
| Whig | George Phipps | 387 | 34.5 | N/A |
| Conservative | George Frederick Young | 313 | 27.9 | N/A |
| Turnout | | 561 (est) | 69.7 (est) | N/A |
| Registered electors | | 805 | | |
| Majority | | 35 | 3.1 | N/A |
| Peelite hold | | Swing | N/A | |
| Majority | | 74 | 6.6 | N/A |
| Whig hold | | Swing | N/A | |

Phipps was appointed Treasurer of the Household, requiring a by-election.

By-election, 1 January 1853: Scarborough (1 seat)
| Party | Candidate | Votes | % | ±% |
|---|---|---|---|---|
| Whig | George Phipps | Unopposed | | |
| Whig hold | | | | |

General election 1857: Scarborough (2 seats)
| Party | Candidate | Votes | % | ±% |
|---|---|---|---|---|
| Peelite | John Vanden-Bempde-Johnstone | 540 | 40.8 | +3.2 |
| Whig | George Phipps | 508 | 38.4 | +3.9 |
| Conservative | Augustus Frederick Bayford | 275 | 20.8 | −7.1 |
| Turnout | | 662 (est) | 70.8 (est) | +1.1 |
| Registered electors | | 934 | | |
| Majority | | 32 | 2.4 | −0.7 |
| Peelite hold | | Swing | +3.4 | |
| Majority | | 233 | 17.6 | +11.0 |
| Whig hold | | Swing | +3.7 | |

Phipps resigned after being appointed Lieutenant Governor of Nova Scotia, causing a by-election.

By-election, 14 December 1857: Scarborough (1 seat)
| Party | Candidate | Votes | % | ±% |
|---|---|---|---|---|
| Whig | John Dent | 373 | 57.1 | +18.7 |
| Conservative | George John Cayley | 280 | 42.9 | +22.1 |
| Majority | | 93 | 14.2 | −3.4 |
| Turnout | | 653 | 69.9 | −0.9 |
| Registered electors | | 934 | | |
| Whig hold | | Swing | −1.7 | |

General election 1859: Scarborough (2 seats)
| Party | Candidate | Votes | % | ±% |
|---|---|---|---|---|
| Liberal | William Denison | 562 | 35.2 | N/A |
| Liberal | John Vanden-Bempde-Johnstone | 540 | 33.8 | −7.0 |
| Liberal | John Dent | 428 | 26.8 | −11.6 |
| Conservative | George John Cayley | 66 | 4.1 | −16.7 |
| Majority | | 112 | 7.0 | +4.6 |
| Turnout | | 798 (est) | 82.5 (est) | +11.7 |
| Registered electors | | 967 | | |
| Liberal hold | | Swing | N/A | |
| Liberal hold | | Swing | +0.7 | |

=== Elections in the 1860s ===
Denison succeeded to the peerage, becoming Lord Londesborough and causing a by-election.

By-election, 1 February 1860: Scarborough (1 seat)
| Party | Candidate | Votes | % | ±% |
|---|---|---|---|---|
| Liberal | John Dent | 472 | 58.1 | +31.3 |
| Liberal | James Molyneux Caulfield | 340 | 41.9 | N/A |
| Majority | | 132 | 16.2 | +9.2 |
| Turnout | | 812 | 75.3 | −7.2 |
| Registered electors | | 1,078 | | |
| Liberal hold | | Swing | N/A | |

General election 1865: Scarborough (2 seats)
| Party | Candidate | Votes | % | ±% |
|---|---|---|---|---|
| Liberal | John Vanden-Bempde-Johnstone | 932 | 45.5 | +11.7 |
| Liberal | John Dent | 674 | 32.9 | +6.1 |
| Conservative | George John Cayley | 441 | 21.5 | +17.4 |
| Majority | | 233 | 11.4 | +4.4 |
| Turnout | | 1,244 (est) | 92.1 (est) | +9.6 |
| Registered electors | | 1,351 | | |
| Liberal hold | | Swing | +1.5 | |
| Liberal hold | | Swing | −1.3 | |

General election 1868: Scarborough (2 seats)
| Party | Candidate | Votes | % | ±% |
|---|---|---|---|---|
| Liberal | John Vanden-Bempde-Johnstone | 1,826 | 43.0 | −2.5 |
| Liberal | John Dent | 1,678 | 39.5 | +6.6 |
| Conservative | George John Cayley | 742 | 17.5 | −4.0 |
| Majority | | 936 | 22.0 | +10.6 |
| Turnout | | 2,494 (est) | 84.1 (est) | −8.0 |
| Registered electors | | 2,964 | | |
| Liberal hold | | Swing | −0.3 | |
| Liberal hold | | Swing | +4.3 | |

Vanden-Bempde-Johnstone's death caused a by-election.

By-election, 12 March 1869: Scarborough (1 seat)
| Party | Candidate | Votes | % | ±% |
|---|---|---|---|---|
| Liberal | Harcourt Vanden-Bempde-Johnstone | Unopposed | | |
| Liberal hold | | | | |

=== Elections in the 1870s ===
General election 1874: Scarborough (2 seats)
| Party | Candidate | Votes | % | ±% |
|---|---|---|---|---|
| Conservative | Charles Legard | 1,280 | 32.4 | +14.9 |
| Liberal | Harcourt Vanden-Bempde-Johnstone | 1,103 | 27.9 | −15.1 |
| Liberal | John Dent | 799 | 20.2 | −19.3 |
| Liberal | Thorold Rogers | 772 | 19.5 | N/A |
| Majority | | 481 | 12.2 | N/A |
| Turnout | | 2,617 (est) | 72.1 (est) | −12.0 |
| Registered electors | | 3,631 | | |
| Conservative gain from Liberal | | Swing | +16.1 | |
| Liberal hold | | Swing | −15.0 | |

=== Elections in the 1880s ===
General election 1880: Scarborough (2 seats)
| Party | Candidate | Votes | % | ±% |
|---|---|---|---|---|
| Liberal | Harcourt Vanden-Bempde-Johnstone | 2,157 | 29.3 | −4.5 |
| Liberal | William Sproston Caine | 2,065 | 28.0 | −5.8 |
| Conservative | John Cookson Fife-Cookson | 1,581 | 21.5 | +5.3 |
| Conservative | Charles Legard | 1,562 | 21.2 | +5.0 |
| Majority | | 503 | 6.8 | N/A |
| Turnout | | 3,683 (est) | 85.6 (est) | +13.5 |
| Registered electors | | 4,302 | | |
| Liberal hold | | Swing | −4.9 | |
| Liberal gain from Conservative | | Swing | −5.4 | |

Johnstone's resignation caused a by-election.

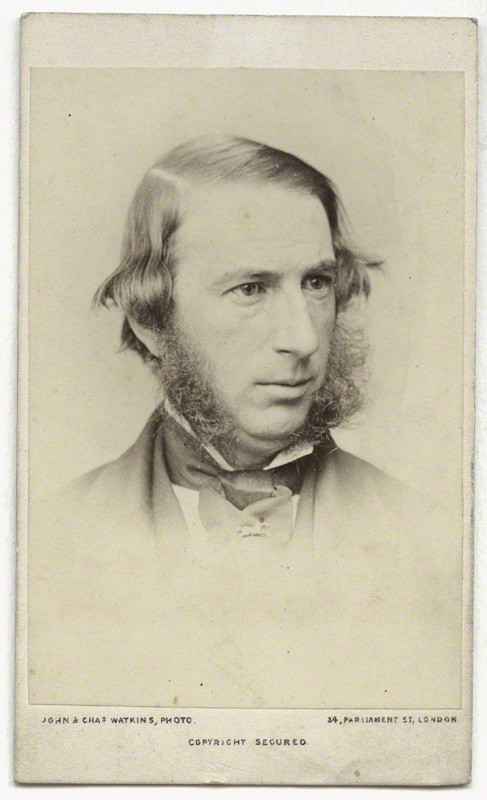
Dodson

By-election, 31 July 1880: Scarborough
| Party | Candidate | Votes | % | ±% |
|---|---|---|---|---|
| Liberal | John Dodson | 1,828 | 53.2 | −4.1 |
| Conservative | Arthur Duncombe | 1,606 | 46.8 | +4.1 |
| Majority | | 222 | 6.4 | −0.4 |
| Turnout | | 3,434 | 79.8 | −5.8 (est) |
| Registered electors | | 4,302 | | |
| Liberal hold | | Swing | −4.1 | |

Dodson was elevated to the peerage, becoming Lord Monk Bretton, causing a by-election.

By-election, 5 November 1884: Scarborough
| Party | Candidate | Votes | % | ±% |
|---|---|---|---|---|
| Liberal | Richard Steble | 1,895 | 54.1 | −3.2 |
| Conservative | George Sitwell | 1,606 | 45.9 | +3.2 |
| Majority | | 289 | 8.2 | +1.8 |
| Turnout | | 3,501 | 84.0 | −1.6 (est) |
| Registered electors | | 4,167 | | |
| Liberal hold | | Swing | −3.2 | |

Caine was appointed Civil Lord of the Admiralty, requiring a by-election.

By-election, 28 November 1884: Scarborough
| Party | Candidate | Votes | % | ±% |
|---|---|---|---|---|
| Liberal | William Sproston Caine | 1,832 | 52.8 | −4.5 |
| Conservative | George Sitwell | 1,639 | 47.2 | +4.5 |
| Majority | | 193 | 5.6 | −2.6 |
| Turnout | | 3,471 | 83.3 | −2.3 (est) |
| Registered electors | | 4,167 | | |
| Liberal hold | | Swing | −4.5 | |

== Elections 1885–1918 ==
=== Elections in the 1880s ===
General election 1885: Scarborough
| Party | Candidate | Votes | % | ±% |
|---|---|---|---|---|
| Conservative | George Sitwell | 2,185 | 51.6 | +8.9 |
| Liberal | John Glover | 2,048 | 48.4 | −8.9 |
| Majority | | 137 | 3.2 | N/A |
| Turnout | | 4,233 | 90.7 | +5.1 (est) |
| Registered electors | | 4,666 | | |
| Conservative gain from Liberal | | Swing | +8.9 | |

General election 1886: Scarborough
| Party | Candidate | Votes | % | ±% |
|---|---|---|---|---|
| Liberal | Joshua Rowntree | 2,122 | 51.2 | +2.8 |
| Conservative | George Sitwell | 2,020 | 48.8 | −2.8 |
| Majority | | 102 | 2.4 | N/A |
| Turnout | | 4,142 | 88.8 | −1.9 |
| Registered electors | | 4,666 | | |
| Liberal gain from Conservative | | Swing | +2.8 | |

=== Elections in the 1890s ===
General election 1892: Scarborough
| Party | Candidate | Votes | % | ±% |
|---|---|---|---|---|
| Conservative | George Sitwell | 2,293 | 51.9 | +3.1 |
| Liberal | Joshua Rowntree | 2,122 | 48.1 | −3.1 |
| Majority | | 171 | 3.8 | N/A |
| Turnout | | 4,415 | 90.5 | +1.7 |
| Registered electors | | 4,877 | | |
| Conservative gain from Liberal | | Swing | +3.1 | |

Rickett

General election 1895: Scarborough
| Party | Candidate | Votes | % | ±% |
|---|---|---|---|---|
| Liberal | Joseph Compton-Rickett | 2,415 | 50.2 | +2.1 |
| Conservative | George Sitwell | 2,391 | 49.8 | −2.1 |
| Majority | | 24 | 0.4 | N/A |
| Turnout | | 4,806 | 91.0 | +0.5 |
| Registered electors | | 5,284 | | |
| Liberal gain from Conservative | | Swing | +2.1 | |

=== Elections in the 1900s ===
General election 1900: Scarborough
| Party | Candidate | Votes | % | ±% |
|---|---|---|---|---|
| Liberal | Joseph Compton-Rickett | 2,548 | 51.1 | +0.9 |
| Conservative | George Sitwell | 2,441 | 48.9 | −0.9 |
| Majority | | 107 | 2.2 | +1.8 |
| Turnout | | 4,989 | 87.1 | −3.9 |
| Registered electors | | 5,730 | | |
| Liberal hold | | Swing | +0.9 | |

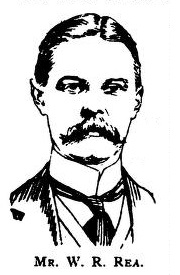

General election 1906: Scarborough
| Party | Candidate | Votes | % | ±% |
|---|---|---|---|---|
| Liberal | Walter Rea | 3,128 | 54.4 | +3.3 |
| Conservative | Charles Edward Hunter | 2,619 | 45.6 | −3.3 |
| Majority | | 509 | 8.8 | +6.6 |
| Turnout | | 5,747 | 92.0 | +4.9 |
| Registered electors | | 6,250 | | |
| Liberal hold | | Swing | +3.3 | |

=== Elections in the 1910s ===
General election January 1910: Scarborough
| Party | Candidate | Votes | % | ±% |
|---|---|---|---|---|
| Liberal | Walter Rea | 3,011 | 52.5 | −1.9 |
| Conservative | George Monckton-Arundell | 2,719 | 47.5 | +1.9 |
| Majority | | 292 | 5.0 | −3.8 |
| Turnout | | 5,730 | 92.9 | +0.9 |
| Registered electors | | 6,166 | | |
| Liberal hold | | Swing | −1.9 | |

General election December 1910: Scarborough
| Party | Candidate | Votes | % | ±% |
|---|---|---|---|---|
| Liberal | Walter Rea | 2,763 | 50.5 | −2.0 |
| Conservative | George Monckton-Arundell | 2,711 | 49.5 | +2.0 |
| Majority | | 52 | 1.0 | −4.0 |
| Turnout | | 5,474 | 88.8 | −4.1 |
| Registered electors | | 6,166 | | |
| Liberal hold | | Swing | −2.0 | |

General election 1914–15:

Another general election was required to take place before the end of 1915. The political parties had been making preparations for an election to take place and by July 1914, the following candidates had been selected;

- Liberal: Walter Rea
- Unionist:

By-election, 1915: Scarborough
| Party | Candidate | Votes | % | ±% |
|---|---|---|---|---|
| Liberal | Walter Rea | Unopposed | | |
| Liberal hold | | | | |

== Elections 1970–1997 ==
=== Elections in the 1970s ===
General election February 1974: Scarborough
| Party | Candidate | Votes | % | ±% |
|---|---|---|---|---|
| Conservative | Michael Shaw | 21,858 | 47.66 | |
| Liberal | Michael Ford Pitts | 16,751 | 36.53 | |
| Labour | D. J. Taylor-Goodby | 7,034 | 15.34 | |
| Independent | M. J. Ellis | 114 | 0.25 | |
| Ind. Conservative | B. M. Stoker | 102 | 0.22 | |
| Majority | | 5,107 | 11.13 | |
| Turnout | | 45,859 | 78.93 | |
| Conservative hold | | Swing | | |

General election October 1974: Scarborough
| Party | Candidate | Votes | % | ±% |
|---|---|---|---|---|
| Conservative | Michael Shaw | 19,831 | 49.73 | |
| Liberal | Michael J. L. Brook | 10,123 | 25.39 | |
| Labour | D. J. Taylor-Goodby | 9,923 | 24.88 | |
| Majority | | 9,708 | 24.34 | |
| Turnout | | 39,877 | 68.10 | |
| Conservative hold | | Swing | | |

General election 1979: Scarborough
| Party | Candidate | Votes | % | ±% |
|---|---|---|---|---|
| Conservative | Michael Shaw | 23,669 | 53.16 | |
| Labour | E. J. Lahteela | 11,344 | 25.48 | |
| Liberal | S. Galloway | 9,025 | 20.27 | |
| Independent | T. Yelin | 487 | 1.09 | New |
| Majority | | 12,325 | 27.68 | |
| Turnout | | 44,525 | 73.12 | |
| Conservative hold | | Swing | | |

=== Elections in the 1980s ===
General election 1983: Scarborough
| Party | Candidate | Votes | % | ±% |
|---|---|---|---|---|
| Conservative | Michael Shaw | 27,977 | 54.25 | |
| SDP | Rosamund Jordan | 14,048 | 27.24 | |
| Labour | John Battersby | 9,545 | 18.51 | |
| Majority | | 13,929 | 27.01 | |
| Turnout | | 51,570 | 71.27 | |
| Conservative hold | | Swing | | |

General election 1987: Scarborough
| Party | Candidate | Votes | % | ±% |
|---|---|---|---|---|
| Conservative | Michael Shaw | 27,672 | 50.65 | |
| SDP | Hilary Callan | 14,046 | 25.71 | |
| Labour | Mark Wolstenholme | 12,913 | 23.64 | |
| Majority | | 13,626 | 24.94 | |
| Turnout | | 54,631 | 73.22 | |
| Conservative hold | | Swing | | |

=== Election in the 1990s ===
General election 1992: Scarborough
| Party | Candidate | Votes | % | ±% |
|---|---|---|---|---|
| Conservative | John Sykes | 29,334 | 49.8 | −0.8 |
| Labour | David L. Billing | 17,600 | 29.9 | +6.3 |
| Liberal Democrats | A. Davenport | 11,133 | 18.9 | −6.8 |
| Green | Richard C. Richardson | 876 | 1.5 | New |
| Majority | | 11,734 | 19.9 | −5.0 |
| Turnout | | 58,943 | 77.2 | +4.0 |
| Conservative hold | | Swing | −3.6 | |

== See also ==
- Parliamentary constituencies in North Yorkshire

== Sources ==
- D. Brunton & D. H. Pennington, Members of the Long Parliament (London: George Allen & Unwin, 1954)
- Cobbett's Parliamentary history of England, from the Norman Conquest in 1066 to the year 1803 (London: Thomas Hansard, 1808)
- F. W. S. Craig, British Parliamentary Election Results 1832–1885 (2nd edition, Aldershot: Parliamentary Research Services, 1989)
- Thomas Hinderwell, The history and antiquities of Scarborough and the vicinity (2nd edition, York: Thomas Wilson & Son, 1811)
- J. Holladay Philbin, Parliamentary Representation 1832 – England and Wales (New Haven: Yale University Press, 1965)
- Edward Porritt and Annie G. Porritt, The Unreformed House of Commons (Cambridge University Press, 1903)
- Henry Stooks Smith, The Parliaments of England from 1715 to 1847 (2nd edition, edited by F. W. S. Craig – Chichester: Parliamentary Reference Publications, 1973)
- Robert Walcott, English Politics in the Early Eighteenth Century (Oxford: Oxford University Press, 1956)

Parliament of the United Kingdom
| Preceded by Oxford University | Constituency represented by the speaker 1817–1832 | Succeeded by Cambridge University |
