= Richard Cholmeley (died 1631) =

English landowner and politician

Sir Richard Cholmeley (c. 1579 – 23 September 1631) was an English landowner and politician who sat in the House of Commons from 1621 to 1622.

Cholmeley was the son of Sir Henry Cholmeley and his wife Margaret Babthorpe, daughter of Sir William Babthorpe. He was knighted at Gratton, Northamptonshire in 1603. He went to live at Whitby in 1608 and was a J.P. and Deputy Lieutenant for Yorkshire. In 1621, he was elected Member of Parliament for Scarborough. He was High Sheriff of Yorkshire in 1624.

Cholmeley died aged 51 and was buried in the chancel of the Church of Saint Mary, Whitby where his widow erected a marble and alabaster monument.

Cholmeley married as his first wife Susanna Legard, daughter of John Legard of Ganton, Yorkshire in 1590. She died in 1611 and in 1613 he married Margaret Cobb, sister of Sir William Cobb of Adderbury. His son by his first wife, Hugh, became a baronet. His second son, Henry, was a political figure of some importance.

Parliament of England
Preceded by Sir Thomas Posthumous Hoby; William Conyers	Member of Parliament for Scarborough; 1621–1622; With: William Conyers	Succeeded by William Conyers (Sir) Hugh Cholmeley
