= 1915 Scarborough by-election =

UK parliamentary by-election

The 1915 Scarborough by-election was held on 9 February 1915. The by-election was held due to the incumbent Liberal MP, Walter Rea, becoming Lord Commissioner of the Treasury. It was retained by Rea, who was unopposed due to the war-time electoral pact.
