= George Phipps, 2nd Marquess of Normanby =

British Liberal politician and colonial governor

The Most Honourable The Marquess of Normanby GCB GCMG PC
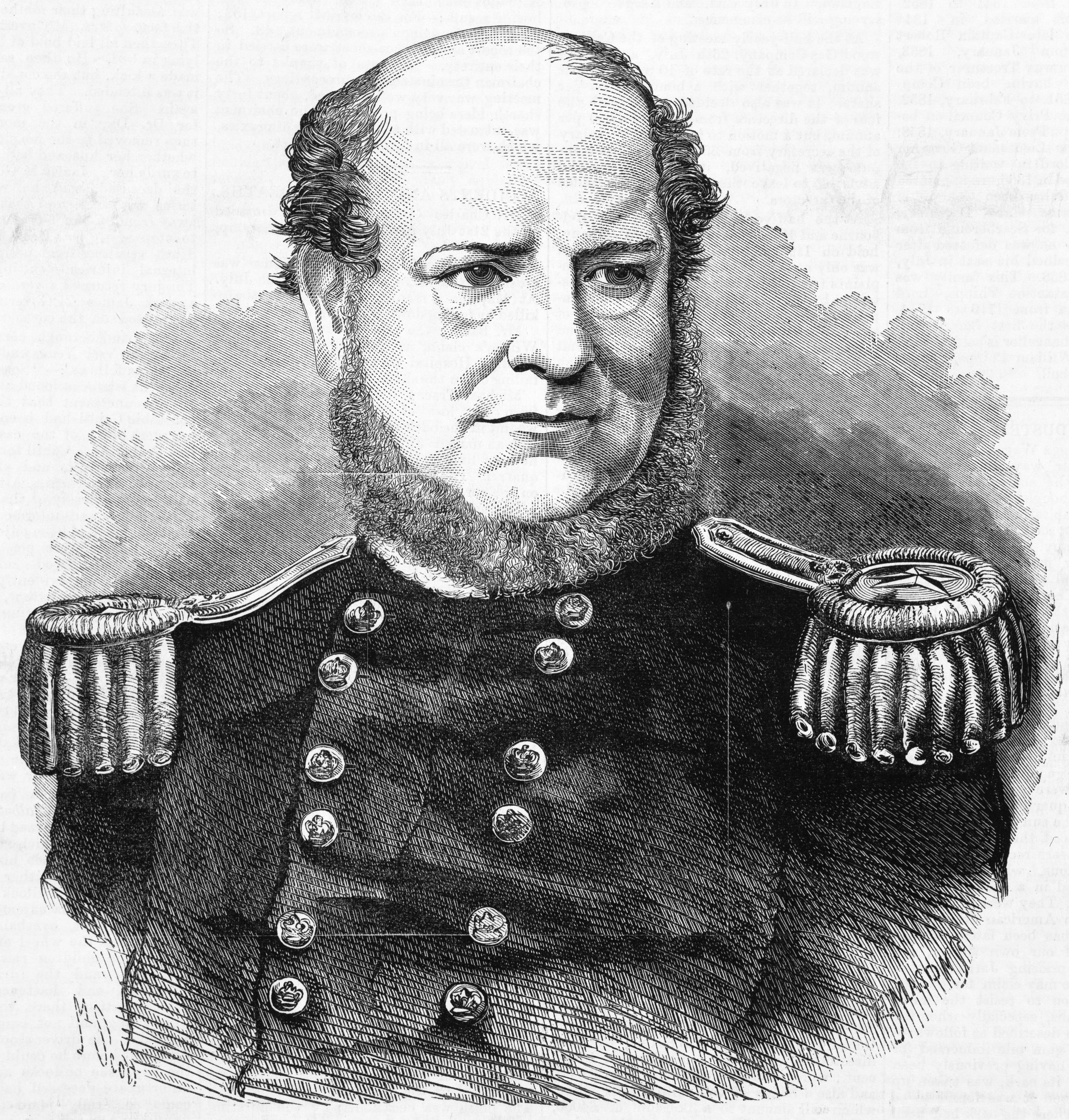
- A drawing of Lord Normanby made in 1871.

32nd Governor of Nova Scotia
- In office 15 February 1858 – 17 September 1863
- Monarch: Victoria
- Preceded by: Sir John Le Marchant
- Succeeded by: Charles Hastings Doyle

3rd Governor of Queensland
- In office 12 August 1871 – 12 November 1874
- Monarch: Victoria
- Preceded by: Sir Samuel Blackall
- Succeeded by: William Cairns

7th Governor of New Zealand
- In office 3 December 1874 – 21 February 1879
- Monarch: Victoria
- Premier: Julius Vogel; Daniel Pollen; Harry Atkinson; George Grey
- Preceded by: Sir James Fergusson
- Succeeded by: Sir Hercules Robinson

6th Governor of Victoria
- In office 29 April 1879 – 18 April 1884
- Monarch: Victoria
- Preceded by: Sir George Bowen
- Succeeded by: Sir Henry Loch

Personal details
- Born: 23 July 1819 London, England
- Died: 3 April 1890 (aged 70) Brighton, Sussex, England
- Party: Liberal Party
- Spouse: Laura Russell (m. 1844; died 1885)
- Children: Lady Constance Phipps; Lady Laura Hampton-Lewis; Constantine Phipps, 3rd Marquess of Normanby; Lord William Phipps; Katherine Egerton, Countess of Ellesmere; Lord Henry Phipps; Lord Hervey Phipps

George Augustus Constantine Phipps, 2nd Marquess of Normanby (23 July 1819 – 3 April 1890), styled Viscount Normanby between 1831 and 1838 and Earl of Mulgrave between 1838 and 1863, was a British Liberal politician and colonial governor of Nova Scotia, Queensland, New Zealand and Victoria.

== Early life ==
Normanby was born in London, the eldest son of Constantine Phipps, 1st Marquess of Normanby and his wife the Hon Maria Liddell, daughter of Thomas Liddell, 1st Baron Ravensworth. He gained the courtesy title Viscount Normanby when his father succeeded to the Earldom of Mulgrave in 1831. When his father was created Marquess of Normanby in 1838, he became known by the courtesy title Earl of Mulgrave.

== Military service ==
Normanby entered the Coldstream Guards as an ensign and became a lieutenant in 1838.

== Political and administrative career ==
Normanby was returned to parliament for Scarborough in 1847, a seat he held until 1851 and again between 1852 and 1857. He was appointed Comptroller of the Household by Lord John Russell in 1851. When Lord Aberdeen became prime minister in late 1852, he became Treasurer of the Household, a post he held until 1858 the last three years under the premiership of Lord Palmerston. In the latter year he was appointed Lieutenant-Governor of Nova Scotia, which he remained until 1863. Whilst he served as Lieutenant-Governor of Nova Scotia, he and his wife had the Prince of Wales (later King Edward VII) and his brother Prince Alfred, Duke of Edinburgh, as their guests at Government House.

In 1863 Normanby succeeded his father in the marquessate and took his seat in the House of Lords.

Normanby returned to the government in 1868 when he was appointed a Lord-in-waiting by William Ewart Gladstone. The following year he was promoted to Captain of the Honourable Corps of Gentlemen-at-Arms. From 1871 to 1874, he was Governor of Queensland. He was then Governor of New Zealand from 1874 to 1879 and Governor of Victoria from 1879 to 1884.

== Marriage and children ==
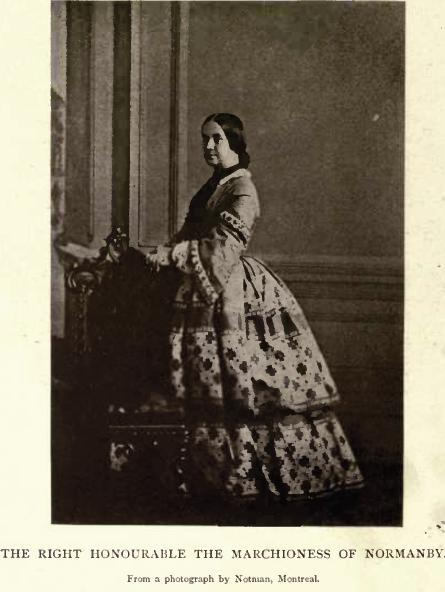
Laura the Marchioness of Normanby by William Notman

Lord Normanby married Laura Russell, daughter of Captain Robert Russell RN, in 1844. The couple had seven children.

- Lady Laura Elizabeth Minnie Phipps (3 June 1845 – 12 October 1934); married John Vivian Hampton-Lewis (1835–1890) on 2 June 1868.
- Constantine Charles Henry Phipps, 3rd Marquess of Normanby (29 August 1846 – 25 August 1932); married Gertrude Stansfeld Forster on 30 December 1903 and had issue.
- Lord William Brook Phipps (13 August 1847 – 19 February 1880); married Constance Emma Keyser (d. 1932) on 31 March 1875 and had issue.
- Lady Katherine Louisa Phipps (31 January 1850 – 23 September 1926); married Francis Egerton, 3rd Earl of Ellesmere, and had issue.
- Lord Henry George Russell Phipps (26 January 1851 – 27 November 1905); married Norma Caroline Georgina Leith-Hay on 17 January 1878 and had issue.
- Lady Constance Mary Phipps (1852–31 October 1883)
- Lord Hervey Lepell Phipps (6 May 1854 – 21 April 1887); unmarried.

== Honours ==
Normanby received the following honours:

- Privy Councillor (PC), 1851.
- Knight Commander of the Order of St Michael and St George (KCMG), 1874.
- Knight Grand Cross of the Order of St Michael and St George (GCMG), 1877.
- Knight Grand Cross of the Order of the Bath (GCB), 1885.

== Death ==
Lady Normanby died in London in January 1885, aged 69. Lord Normanby died at Brighton, Sussex in April 1890, aged 70. He was succeeded in the marquessate and other titles by his eldest son, Constantine.

== Arms ==
Coat of arms of George Phipps, Marquess of Normanby
Crest A lion's jamb erased, sable, holding a trefoil slipped, argent. Escutcheon Quarterly: 1st and 4th, sable, a trefoil slipped within an orle of eight mullets, argent, Phipps; 2nd, paly of six, argent and azure, a bend, gules, Annesley; 3rd, the arms of King James II within a border compony, ermine and azure. Supporters Dexter, a unicorn, ermine, armed, unguled, crined, and tufted, or, and gorged with a chaplet of roses; sinister, a goat, ermine, armed and unguled, azure, gorged as the dexter. Motto Virtute quies (Rest in virtue) Other versions Full achievements:

Parliament of the United Kingdom
Preceded by Sir Frederick Trench; Sir John Vanden-Bempde-Johnstone, Bt	Member of Parliament for Scarborough; 1847–1851; With: Sir John Vanden-Bempde-Johnstone, Bt	Succeeded by Sir John Vanden-Bempde-Johnstone, Bt; George Frederick Young
Preceded by Sir John Vanden-Bempde-Johnstone, Bt; George Frederick Young	Member of Parliament for Scarborough; 1852–1857; With: Sir John Vanden-Bempde-Johnstone, Bt	Succeeded by Sir John Vanden-Bempde-Johnstone, Bt; John Dent
Political offices
Preceded by William Lascelles	Comptroller of the Household; 1851–1852	Succeeded by Hon. George Weld-Forester
Preceded by Lord Claud Hamilton	Treasurer of the Household; 1853–1858	Succeeded by Lord Claud Hamilton
Preceded by New government	Lord-in-waiting; 1868–1869	Succeeded by The Lord Wrottesley
Preceded by The Lord Foley	Captain of the Gentlemen-at-Arms; 1869–1871	Succeeded by The Earl Cowper
Government offices
Preceded by Sir John Le Marchant	Governor of Nova Scotia; 1858–1863	Succeeded by Charles Hastings Doyle
Preceded by Colonel Sir Samuel Blackall	Governor of Queensland; 1871–1874	Succeeded by William Cairns
Preceded by Sir James Fergusson	Governor of New Zealand; 1874–1879	Succeeded by Sir Hercules Robinson
Preceded by Sir George Bowen	Governor of Victoria; 1879–1884	Succeeded by Sir Henry Loch
Peerage of the United Kingdom
Preceded by Constantine Henry Phipps	Marquess of Normanby; 1863–1890	Succeeded by Constantine Charles Henry Phipps
