= John Vanden-Bempde-Johnstone =

British politician (1799–1869)

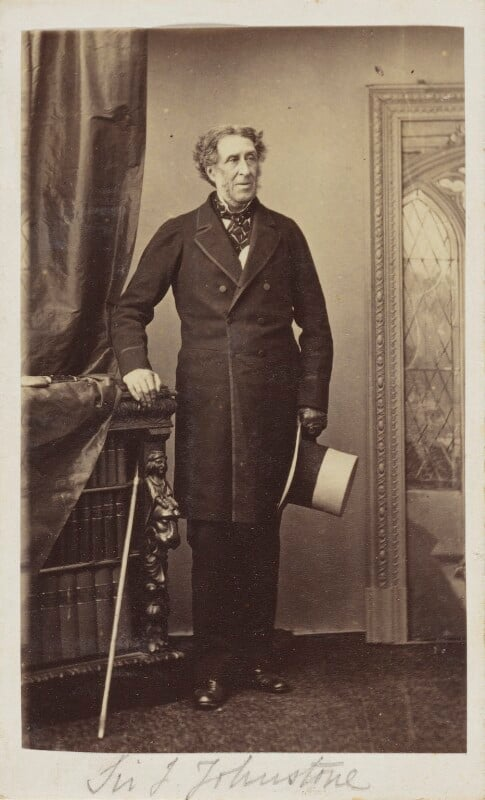
Vanden-Bempde-Johnstone in the 1860s

Sir John Vanden-Bempde-Johnstone, 2nd Baronet (28 August 1799 – 24 February 1869) was a British Member of Parliament.

Vanden-Bempde-Johnstone was the son of Sir Richard Vanden-Bempde-Johnstone, 1st Baronet. He succeeded as second Baronet in 1807, at the age of seven, on the death of his father. In 1830 he was elected to the House of Commons for Yorkshire as a Whig, a seat he held until the constituency was abolished in 1832. The latter year he was returned for Scarborough. During the 1835 parliament he defected from the Whigs to the Conservatives, and lost his seat in 1837, but regained it in 1841, and continued to represent the constituency until his death 28 years later. However, from 1857 he sat as a Liberal.

Vanden-Bempde-Johnstone married Louisa Augusta Venables-Vernon-Harcourt (1804–1869), daughter of the Most Reverend Edward Harcourt, Archbishop of York.

He was elected as a Vice-President of the Yorkshire Philosophical Society in 1824.

He died, from injuries in a hunting accident, in February 1869, aged 69, and was succeeded in the baronetcy by his eldest son Harcourt, who also succeeded him as Member of Parliament for Scarborough and who was elevated to the peerage as Baron Derwent in 1881. Lady Vanden-Bempde-Johnstone survived her husband by less than half a year, and died in August 1869.

== Notes ==
Parliament of the United Kingdom
Preceded by William Duncombe; The Viscount Morpeth; Henry Brougham; Richard Bethell	Member of Parliament for Yorkshire; 1830–1832; With: William Duncombe 1830–1831; The Viscount Morpeth 1830–1832; Richard Bethell 1830–1831; George Strickland 1831–1832; John Charles Ramsden 1831–1832	constituency abolished
Preceded by Charles Manners-Sutton; Hon. Edmund Phipps	Member of Parliament for Scarborough; 1832–1837; With: Sir George Cayley 1832–1835; Sir Frederick Trench 1835–1837	Succeeded by Sir Frederick Trench; Sir Thomas Charles Style
Preceded by Sir Frederick Trench; Sir Thomas Charles Style	Member of Parliament for Scarborough; 1841–1869; Served alongside: Sir Frederick Trench 1841–1847; The Earl of Mulgrave 1847–1851; George Frederick Young 1851–1852; The Earl of Mulgrave 1852–1857; John Dent 1857–1859; William Denison 1859–1860; John Dent 1860–1869	Succeeded by John Dent; Sir Harcourt Vanden-Beeped-Johnstone
Baronetage of Great Britain
Preceded by Richard Vanden-Bempde-Johnstone	Baronet (of Hackness Hall); 1807–1869	Succeeded by Harcourt Vanden-Bempde-Johnstone
