= John Acclom (15th-century politician) =

Member of the Parliament of England

John Acclom or Acklam (1395–1458) was a Member of Parliament for Scarborough multiple times in the mid-fifteenth century.

== Early life and inheritance ==
John Acclom of Scarborough was the second son of John Acclom I(d.1402), and the nephew of another Acclom MP for the same constituency, his uncle Robert Acclom. When his father died, John II inherited various rents and tenements in and around Scraborough, as well as the reversion of his step-mother's small estate. In 1405 Acclom presented a suit in Chancery against Sir Richard Redmayne, for £240. This was because Redmayne was Escheator for Yorkshire, and had held the Inquisition into the death of Acclom's relative, Henry Acclom. As a result of this flawed inquisition, claimed Acclom, Redmayne confiscated goods worth £240 from Henry's estates that were due to John Acclom. The records do not survive to report the outcome of this dispute.

== Career ==
From then on – with the exception of a charge of piracy against him and others in 1412, which cost them £196 – he was rarely active in community politics until 1420, when he sat on a commission of ad quod damnum. The following year, his career picked up, and he was returned to the parliament called for December 1421. He was subsequently appointed bailiff of Scarborough, and then sat again in the 1426 parliament at Leicester (the Parliament of Bats). Throughout this period he also performed royal service defending the border with Scotland, possibly as part of the Earl of Northumberland's retinue at Berwick Castle, for which he received Letters of Protection.

== Later life and death ==
Acclom continued to augment his Scarborough estates as well as acting as a royal commissioner when required. He spent much of his later life involved in litigation, particularly concerning the estate of a London fishmonger, Sir William Righthouse, who had died in Scarborough, in which Acclom 'had held an interest,' and whose feoffees he sued. This led to him once again having to defend himself in Chancery against a charge of having malappropriated a deed of Righthouse's which he then refused to return; historian Carol Rawcliffe has speculated that this may indicate that Righthouse had been indebted to Acclom in some way, but also that this 'is now impossible to determine.' He continued through this time in an official capacity, acting as a receiver of the customs of Hull.

Acclom spent the last seventeen years of his life quietly, with no further political, administrative or legal activity being known of. He died on 7 July 1458, leaving his widow Alice a £4 annuity from his town properties; it is unknown if they had had any children.
