= Luke Robinson (MP, died 1669) =

English politician

Luke Robinson (c. 1610–1669), of Riseborough, was an English Member of Parliament and of the Council of State during the Commonwealth period.

Robinson was the eldest son of Sir Arthur Robinson of Deighton, Northallerton, Yorkshire and his first wife Elizabeth Walthall, daughter of William Walthall mercer of London. He was baptised on 6 September 1610. He was educated at Shenley, Hertfordshire, Aughton, Yorkshire and St Peter's, York before attending Christ's College, Cambridge in 1627. He was a student of Gray's Inn in 1630.

Robinson was elected MP for Scarborough in 1645, taking the place of a member who had been expelled for his Royalist sympathies, and sat for the town through the remainder of the Long Parliament, being an active member of the Rump after Pride's Purge, and also served as Bailiff of Scarborough in 1652. He subsequently represented Yorkshire in the Second and Malton in the Third Parliaments of the Protectorate, before resuming his seat for Scarborough when the Rump was reinstated in 1659. He was elected a member of the Council of State in 1649, 1650 and 1659.

In January 1660, Robinson was chosen (together with Thomas Scot, the Secretary of State) as the Rump's emissary to the advancing General Monck. Their ostensible purpose was to convey congratulations and expressions of good will, but in fact Parliament clearly intended them both to spy on him and if possible to hinder him from any course of action except that which would help the Rump's survival. (At this stage it was not clear that Monck was contemplating the restoration of the King.) Scot and Robinson met Monck outside Leicester. Thereafter they dogged his footsteps, insisting on being quartered at the same inn as Monck at every town. At Harborough, they intercepted the delegation sent by the City of London and insisted on answering it on Monck's behalf; at St Albans Monck discovered they had bored a hole in the wall so they could spy on him from their own quarters. When Monck entered London on 3 February 1660, Scot and Robinson rode with him at the head of his troops as visible demonstration that he derived his authority to act only from Parliament. But their efforts were in vain and Monck was undeterred from following his own course of action. Later the same month, both Scot and Robinson lost their seats on the Council of State.

After the Restoration, Robinson was elected once more to represent Scarborough in the Convention Parliament. On 1 May 1660, the King's letter containing the Declaration of Breda was read out in the House of Commons, and the previously republican Robinson apparently underwent a dramatic conversion to the Royal cause; he was first to speak after the letter was read, and did so "bathed in tears". (The incident is recorded by Samuel Pepys in his diary the following day: "Luke Robinson himself stood up and made a recantation for what he had done, and promises to be a loyal subject to his Prince for the time to come.") Nevertheless, Robinson was soon after expelled from the Commons, by order of the House on 21 June 1660. The House of Commons Journals record no reason for the expulsion, but it seems reasonable to assume that his record during the Commonwealth was considered unacceptable. He apparently took no further part in public life before his death in 1669.

Robinson was clearly a figure well-known and disliked by the Royalists, and he was one of a number of Roundhead figures mocked in a popular Cavalier song of the period:

Luke Robinson shall go before ye,
that snarling northern tyke;
Be sure he’ll not adore ye,
for honour he doth not like;
He cannot honour inherit,
and he knows he can never merit,
And therefore he cannot bear it
that any one else should wear it.

Sing hi ho, envious lown,
you're of the beagle's kind,
Who always bark'd at the moon,
because in the dark it shined.
Sing hi ho, etc.

and another popular ballad of the period described him:

Luke Robinson, that clownado,
Though his heart be a granado,
Yet a high shoe with his hand in his poke
Is his most perfect shadow.
