= Robert Squire =

English politician (died 1707)

Robert Squire (c. 1648 – 8 October 1707) was an English Tory politician who sat as MP for Scarborough from 1705 till his death on 8 October 1707.

He was the fifth son of William Squire and his second wife Anne, the daughter of William Savile. On 13 December 1684, he married Priscilla (died 1711), the daughter and heiress of Edward Bower and had one son (who predeceased him) and two daughters.
