= Harcourt Vanden-Bempde-Johnstone, 1st Baron Derwent =

British peer and Liberal Party politician

Harcourt Vanden-Bempde-Johnstone, 1st Baron Derwent (3 January 1829 – 1 March 1916), known as Sir Harcourt Vanden-Bempde-Johnstone, 3rd Baronet, from 1869 to 1881, was a British peer and Liberal Party politician. He served for ten years as a Member of Parliament (MP), before becoming a peer with a seat in the House of Lords.

== Career ==
Derwent was the son of Sir John Vanden-Bempde-Johnstone, 2nd Baronet, and Louisa Augusta Venables-Vernon-Harcourt, daughter of the Most Reverend Edward Venables-Vernon-Harcourt, Archbishop of York. He succeeded as second Baronet on the death of his father in 1869 and the same year he also succeeded his father as MP for Scarborough, a seat he held until 1880. In 1881 he was raised to the peerage as Baron Derwent, of Hackness in the North Riding of the County of York.

As a young man he served as a lieutenant in the 2nd Life Guards, and on 22 January 1863 he was commissioned as major in the 1st Administrative Brigade of Yorkshire (East Riding) Artillery Volunteers.

== Family ==
Lord Derwent married Charlotte Mills, daughter of Sir Charles Mills, 1st Baronet, of Hillingdon Court, in 1850. They had nine children:

- Francis, 2nd Baron Derwent, born 26 May 1851, died 30 April 1929
- Hilda Vanden-Bempde-Johnstone, died young, March 1853
- Hon. Edward Henry Vanden-Bempde-Johnstone, born 27 November 1854, died 29 April 1903
- Hon. Cecil C.E. Vanden-Bempde-Johnstone, born 26 December 1856, died 29 January 1933
- Sir Alan Vanden-Bempde-Johnstone, GCVO, born 31 August 1858, died 31 July 1932
- Hon. Edith Vanden-Bempde-Johnstone, born 7 June 1860
- Hon. Louis Vanden-Bempde-Johnstone, born 25 February 1862, died 12 December 1922
- Mary Vanden-Bempde-Johnstone, died young 1865
- Hon. Gilbert Vanden-Bempde-Johnstone, 25 September 1865, died 5 January 1949

Lady Derwent died in 1901. Lord Derwent survived her by fifteen years and died in March 1916, aged 87. He was succeeded in his titles by his eldest son Francis.

== Notes ==
Parliament of the United Kingdom
Preceded by Sir John Vanden-Bempde-Johnstone and John Dent	Member of Parliament for Scarborough; 1869–1880; With: John Dent 1869–1874; Sir Charles Legard 1874–1880; William Sproston Caine 1880	Succeeded by William Sproston Caine and John George Dodson
Baronetage of Great Britain
Preceded by John Vanden-Bempde-Johnstone	Baronet (of Hackness Hall); 1869–1916	Succeeded by Francis Vanden-Bempde-Johnstone
Peerage of the United Kingdom
New creation	Baron Derwent; 1881–1916	Succeeded by Francis Vanden-Bempde-Johnstone
