= Sir William Strickland, 4th Baronet =

English landowner and Whig politician

Sir William Strickland, 4th Baronet PC (c. 1686 – 1 September 1735), of Boynton, East Riding of Yorkshire, was an English landowner and Whig politician, who sat in the House of Commons from 1708 to 1735. He was a Government Minister in Sir Robert Walpole's administration.

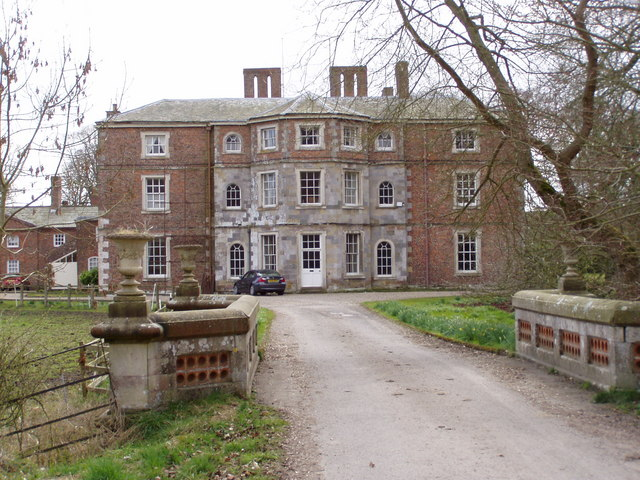
Boynton Hall - seat of the Strickland baronets

Strickland was the eldest son of Sir William Strickland of Boynton, a Yorkshire landowner and Member of Parliament, and his wife Elizabeth Palmes.

At the 1708 British general election Strickland's father, who for some years had been MP for the local borough of Malton, was instead chosen as Member for Yorkshire – a much more prestigious constituency – and Strickland took his place representing Malton. From the first he was a loyal Whig and was recognised as a strong speaker.

Strickland remained MP for Malton until 1715, then represented Carlisle from 1715 to 1722 and finally Scarborough for the remaining thirteen years of his life.

Strickland inherited the baronetcy and Boynton Hall near Scarborough on his father's death in 1724. He became a friend of Robert Walpole and held a succession of junior posts. He was a Lord of the Treasury from 1725 to 1727, and also became Treasurer of the Household to the Queen. In 1729 he chaired a Parliamentary Committee on reform of the legal profession. In 1730, when Walpole reconstructed his government and promoted Henry Pelham to be Paymaster General, Strickland was chosen to take his place as Secretary at War (arguably the most important ministerial post outside the cabinet), and was made a Privy Counsellor. This post he held until forced to retire by ill health in May 1735.

Away from Parliament, Sir William spent a considerable sum on ambitious alterations to Boynton Hall, commissioning Lord Burlington to design a new frontage and William Kent to design the interiors. However, when he returned from London to view the work he found to his fury that the local builders had failed to follow Lord Burlington's instructions, and the rebuilt hall bore little resemblance to the plans, in particular having an "old-fashioned roof" instead of the fashionable Palladian style he had been expecting!

Srickland died on 1 September 1735 at Boynton. He had married Catherine Sambrooke, daughter of Sir Jeremy Sambrooke, by settlement dated 9 March 1723. They had one son – George, who succeeded him in the baronetcy – and one daughter. His wife outlived him by more than thirty years, dying on 9 February 1767.

Political offices
Preceded by Hon. Henry Pelham	Secretary at War; 1730–1735	Succeeded by Sir William Yonge
Parliament of Great Britain
Preceded by Sir William Strickland, Bt; William Palmes	Member of Parliament for Malton; 1708–1715; With: William Palmes 1708–1713; Thomas Watson-Wentworth 1713–1715	Succeeded by Thomas Watson-Wentworth; Thomas Watson-Wentworth the younger
Preceded by Thomas Stanwix; Sir Christopher Musgrave, Bt	Member of Parliament for Carlisle; 1715–1722; With: Thomas Stanwix 1715–1721; Henry Aglionby 1721–1722	Succeeded by Henry Aglionby; James Bateman
Preceded by John Hungerford; William Thompson	Member of Parliament for Scarborough; 1722–1735; With: John Hungerford 1722–1730; William Thompson 1730–1735	Succeeded by Viscount Dupplin; William Thompson
Baronetage of England
Preceded by William Strickland	Baronet (of Boynton); 1724–1735	Succeeded by George Strickland
