= Sir William Strickland, 3rd Baronet =

English landowner and Whig politician

Sir William Strickland, 3rd Baronet of Boynton, Yorkshire (March 1665 – 12 May 1724) was an English landowner and Whig politician who sat in the English and British House of Commons between 1689 and 1724. He was also a notable racehorse owner.

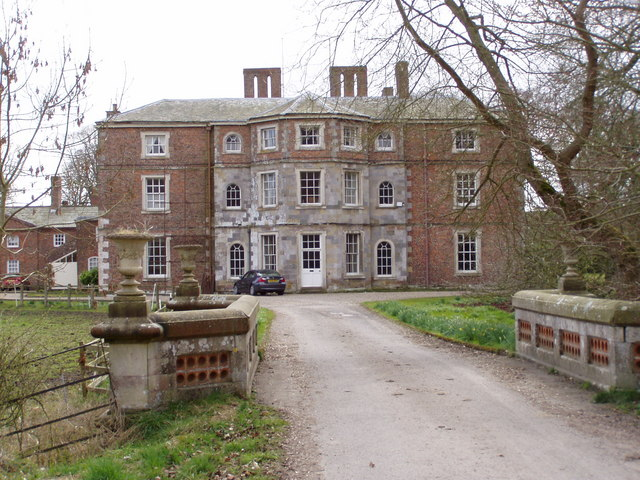
Boynton Hall – seat of the Strickland baronets

== Early life ==
Strickland was the son of Sir Thomas Strickland, 2nd Baronet and his wife Elizabeth Pile. He was educated at Exeter College, Oxford. On 28 August 1684, he married Elizabeth Palmes, daughter and heiress of William Palmes of Lindley. He succeeded to the baronetcy and to Boynton Hall, near Scarborough at the age of nineteen on his father's death in November 1684.

== Career ==
In 1689, Strickland was returned as member of parliament for Malton, a Yorkshire pocket borough controlled at that period by his father-in-law, who occupied its other seat himself. He was returned at Malton unopposed in seven elections until the 1708 general election when he decided to stand at Yorkshire and vacated his seat at Malton in favour of his son, William. Strickland senior was elected at Yorkshire in a contest in 1708 but was defeated at the 1710 general election. After being out of Parliament for a few years he stood at Malton but was defeated at the 1715 general election. However he was returned as MP for Old Sarum at a by-election on 3 August 1716. In 1722 he was returned unopposed at Malton but died after two years. Strickland sat as a Whig, and in the factional battles within that party at the turn of the century was a follower of Lord Wharton and a supporter of the Junto.

Strickland was also High Sheriff of Yorkshire for 1698–99 and appointed Commissary-General of the Musters in 1720.

== Racehorse owner ==
Strickland was an enthusiastic owner and breeder of racehorses, and one of his horses, the Acaster Turk, was Champion Sire in 1721. Strickland was a central character in one of early racing's greatest causes celebres, The Merlin Match. Many of the exact details, even the date and the correct names of the horses involved are unknown; almost all that is certain is that the match took place.

The race was a head-to-head match at Newmarket between Strickland's horse, called Merlin (or possibly Old Merlin or Ancaster Merlin or Little Merlin) and a horse belonging to Tregonwell Frampton the Royal trainer; it was seen as being a symbolic race between the champions of North and South, or of the Provinces and the racing establishment, and attracted widespread interest and heavy betting.

According to the accepted legend, shortly before the race was due to take place Strickland's groom, one Hesseltine, was approached by Frampton's groom, who proposed a secret trial of the horses over the full distance, to give them both inside information and ensure they could bet wisely. Hesseltine agreed and the trial was run, Merlin winning narrowly; but Frampton and Strickland each had instructed their groom to double-cross the other by secretly adding extra weight to their own horse, and both therefore believed they would win the race easily! In the event Merlin won the race much as he had won the trial, as recorded in a popular ballad of the time:

And now, Little Merlin has won the day,
And all for his master's gain
Guarded him to stable
again, again
Guarded him to stable again,
And as they rode through Newmarket,
Many curses on them did fall,
A curse light on these Yorkshire knights,
And their horses and riders
and all, and all,
and their horses and riders and all.

Huge sums were won and lost, with many of those who had bet on Frampton's horse ruined. As a result, the law was soon afterwards changed to make it legally impossible to recover more than £10 of a gambling debt.

== Death ==
Strickland died in May 1724 from a fall at a fox hunt. His son William, who succeeded him in the baronetcy, was the only one of his children who survived to adulthood.

Parliament of England
Preceded by Hon. Thomas Fairfax; Thomas Worsley	Member of Parliament for Malton; 1689–1698; With: William Palmes	Succeeded by William Palmes; Thomas Worsley
Preceded by Thomas Worsley; William Palmes	Member of Parliament for Malton; 1701–1707; With: William Palmes	Succeeded by Parliament of Great Britain
Parliament of Great Britain
Preceded by Parliament of England	Member of Parliament for Malton; 1707–1708; With: William Palmes	Succeeded by William Palmes; William Strickland (junior)
Preceded by The Viscount Downe; Conyers Darcy	Member of Parliament for Yorkshire; 1708–1710; With: The Viscount Downe	Succeeded by The Viscount Downe; Sir Arthur Kaye
Preceded by Thomas Pitt; Robert Pitt	Member of Parliament for Old Sarum; 1716–1722; With: Robert Pitt	Succeeded by Thomas Pitt; Robert Pitt
Preceded by Thomas Watson-Wentworth the younger Thomas Watson-Wentworth the elder	Member of Parliament for Malton; 1722–1724; With: Thomas Watson-Wentworth the younger	Succeeded by Thomas Watson-Wentworth the younger Henry Finch
Baronetage of England
Preceded by Thomas Strickland	Baronet (of Boynton); 1684–1724	Succeeded by William Strickland
