= Higham Ferrers (constituency) =

Parliamentary constituency in the United Kingdom, 1801–1832

- Former borough constituency for the House of Commons

1558–1832
- Seats: One
- Replaced by: North Northamptonshire

Higham Ferrers was a parliamentary borough in Northamptonshire, which was represented in the House of Commons from 1558 until 1832, when it was abolished by the Great Reform Act. It was one of the very small number of English boroughs in that period which was entitled to elect only one rather than two Members of Parliament.

== History ==
The borough consisted of the parish of Higham Ferrers, a small market town in the east of Northamptonshire. In 1831, the population of the borough was 965, and it contained 169 houses; a further two houses were in the town but outside the boundaries of the borough.

Higham Ferrers was incorporated as a municipal borough in 1556 and was first summoned to elect a representative to the Parliament of 1557–1558. The right to vote was exercised by the Mayor, aldermen, burgesses (members of the town corporation), and freemen, provided they were householders in the borough and not receiving alms; in 1831 this comprised a total of 33 voters. Since the corporation elected its own successors and had the right to create freemen (which was sparingly used), this ensured that the power was self-perpetuating and usually entirely under the influence of the local landowner or "patron".

In the first few years of its existence, during the early Elizabethan period, Higham Ferrers seems to have been entirely under the sway of the Duchy of Lancaster, electing Duchy officers as its MPs, but later in the same reign the influence of the local landed families became more evident, in particular the Hattons and the Montagus of Boughton. From the start of the 18th century, however, the Watson-Wentworth family, later Marquesses of Rockingham, owned the borough and exercised an unchallenged right to nominate its MP; on the death of the 2nd Marquess in 1784, the patronage passed to his nephew and heir, the Earl Fitzwilliam, who still retained it at the time of the Reform Act.

Higham Ferrers was abolished as a constituency by the Reform Act, those of its inhabitants who were qualified subsequently voting in the Northern division of the county.

== Members of Parliament ==
=== 1558–1640 ===
Parliament	Member
1558	Ralph Lane
1559 (Jan)	John Purvey
1562–3	John Purvey
1571	Christopher Hatton
1572	Edmund Downing
1584 (Nov)	Humphrey Mildmay
1586 (Sep)	Humphrey Mildmay
1588 (Oct)	Richard Swale
1593	Henry Montagu
1597	Henry Montagu
1601 (Sep)	Henry Montagu
1604–1611	Sir Goddard Pemberton
1614	Rowland St John
1620–1625	Sir Charles Montagu
1626	Sir Thomas Dacres
1626 (Feb)	Sir George Sondes
1628	Sir George Sondes
1629–1640	No Parliaments summoned

=== 1640–1832 ===
Year	Member	Party
November 1640	Sir Christopher Hatton	Royalist
September 1642	Hatton disabled from sitting – seat vacant	
1645	Edward Harby	
1653	Higham Ferrers was unrepresented in the Barebones Parliament and the First and Second Parliaments of the Protectorate	
January 1659	James Nutley	
May 1659	Edward Harby	
April 1660	Sir Thomas Dacres	
1661	Lewis Palmer	
1679	Sir Rice Rudd	
1685	Sir Lewis Palmer	
January 1689	Sir Rice Rudd (Note: Rudd was also elected for Carmarthenshire, which he chose to represent, and did not sit again for Higham Ferrers.)	
February 1689	Hon. Lewis Watson	
July 1689	Thomas Andrew	
1698	Thomas Ekins	
1702	Thomas Pemberton	
1703	Thomas Watson-Wentworth (Note: Wentworth was re-elected in 1714, but had also been elected for Malton, which he chose to represent, and did not sit for Higham Ferrers in this Parliament.)	
1714	Charles Leigh	
1722	Thomas Watson-Wentworth	
1724	John Finch	
May 1741	Henry Finch (Note: Finch was also elected for Malton, which he chose to represent, and never sat for Higham Ferrers.)	
December 1741	Henry Seymour Conway	Whig
1747	John Hill	
1753	Hon. John Yorke	
1768	Frederick Montagu	
June 1790	Viscount Duncannon (Note: Duncannon was also elected for Knaresborough, which he chose to represent, and never sat for Higham Ferrers.)	
December 1790	John Lee	
1793	Serjeant James Adair	Whig
1798	Stephen Thurston Adey	Whig
1801	Francis Ferrand Foljambe	Whig
1807	William Windham	Whig
1810	Viscount Duncannon	Whig
1812	William Plumer	Whig
1822	Viscount Normanby	Whig
1826	Major-General Frederick Ponsonby	Whig
1830	Viscount Howick	Whig
April 1831	Viscount Milton	Whig
July 1831	Charles Pepys	Whig
October 1831	John Ponsonby	Whig
1832	Constituency abolished	
