= Thomas Fairfax, 5th Lord Fairfax of Cameron =

English military officer and politician (1657–1710)

The Right Honourable The Lord Fairfax of Cameron MP
- Portrait by John Riley, 1684

Member of Parliament for Malton
- In office 1685–1685
- Preceded by: William Palmes
- Succeeded by: Seat abolished

Member of Parliament for Yorkshire
- In office 1698–1701
- Succeeded by: The Viscount of Irvine; Sir John Kaye

Personal details
- Born: 16 April 1657
- Died: 6 January 1710 (aged 52)
- Spouse: Catherine Colepepper
- Children: 7, including Thomas Fairfax, 6th Lord Fairfax of Cameron and Robert Fairfax, 7th Lord Fairfax of Cameron
- Parent(s): Henry Fairfax, 4th Lord Fairfax of Cameron; Frances Barwick

Major-General Thomas Fairfax, 5th Lord Fairfax of Cameron (16 April 1657 – 6 January 1710) was an English military officer and politician.

== Early life ==
Fairfax was born on April 16, 1657, the great-grandson of Thomas Fairfax, 1st Lord Fairfax of Cameron of the Scottish peerage. His father was Henry Fairfax, 4th Lord Fairfax of Cameron and his mother was Frances Barwick.

== Career ==
Fairfax graduated from Magdalen College, Oxford in 1675 and served in the Yorkshire Militia under the Earl of Danby. Following the Glorious Revolution of 1688, he was appointed as lieutenant colonel of Lord Castleton's Regiment of Foot, an English Army regiment raised to fight in the Nine Years' War. In 1690 William III appointed Fairfax as colonel of Edward Lloyd's Regiment of Foot following Lloyd's death and in 1694 Fairfax became colonel of Richard Leveson's Regiment of Dragoons. Fairfax was promoted to brigadier general shortly before the Treaty of Ryswick ended the war in 1697 and left the English army in 1703 at the rank of major general.

In 1690 and 1695, he was a Member of Parliament generally supporting the Tory interest, although the modern concept of political parties did not yet apply. He was able to sit in the English Parliament because his title was part of the Scottish peerage; after the 1707 Act of Union, Scottish peers were disqualified and he was required to give up his seat. In 1704 Fairfax obtained a three-year licence from Queen Anne to search for wrecks and treasure in the West Indies but the venture was a financial failure. He died on 6 January 1710.

=== Family ===
In 1685, Fairfax married Catherine Colepepper, daughter of Thomas Colepeper, 2nd Baron Colepeper, and they had seven children: Thomas Fairfax, 6th Lord Fairfax of Cameron, Henry Colpepper Fairfax, Katherine Fairfax, Margaret Fairfax, Frances Fairfax, Mary Fairfax, Robert Fairfax.

Parliament of England
Preceded by William Palmes; Sir Watkinson Payler	Member of Parliament for Malton; 1685–1689; With: Thomas Worsley	Succeeded by William Palmes; Sir William Strickland
Preceded by The Viscount Dungarvan; Sir John Kaye	Member of Parliament for Yorkshire; 1689–1702; With: Sir John Kaye 1689–1698, 1701; The Viscount Downe 1698–1701; The Viscount of Irvine 1701–1702	Succeeded by Marquess of Hartington; Sir John Kaye
Preceded by Marquess of Hartington; Sir John Kaye	Member of Parliament for Yorkshire; 1707; With: Marquess of Hartington	Succeeded by Parliament of Great Britain
Military offices
Preceded by Richard Leveson	Colonel of Lord Fairfax's Regiment of Dragoons; 1694–1695	Succeeded by William Lloyd
Peerage of Scotland
Preceded by Henry Fairfax	Lord Fairfax of Cameron; 1688–1710	Succeeded by Thomas Fairfax
