= Sir William Wentworth, 4th Baronet =

British politician (1686–1763)

Sir William Wentworth, 4th Baronet (1686–1763), of Bretton Hall, West Yorkshire, was a British landowner and politician who sat in the House of Commons from 1731 to 1741.

== Origins ==
Wentworth was baptized at York Minster on 29 October 1686, the second but eldest surviving son of Sir Mathew Wentworth, 3rd Baronet of Bretton by his wife Elizabeth Osbaldeston, a daughter of William Osbaldeston of Hunmanby, Yorkshire. In February 1706, he succeeded his father in the baronetcy.

== Builds Bretton Hall ==
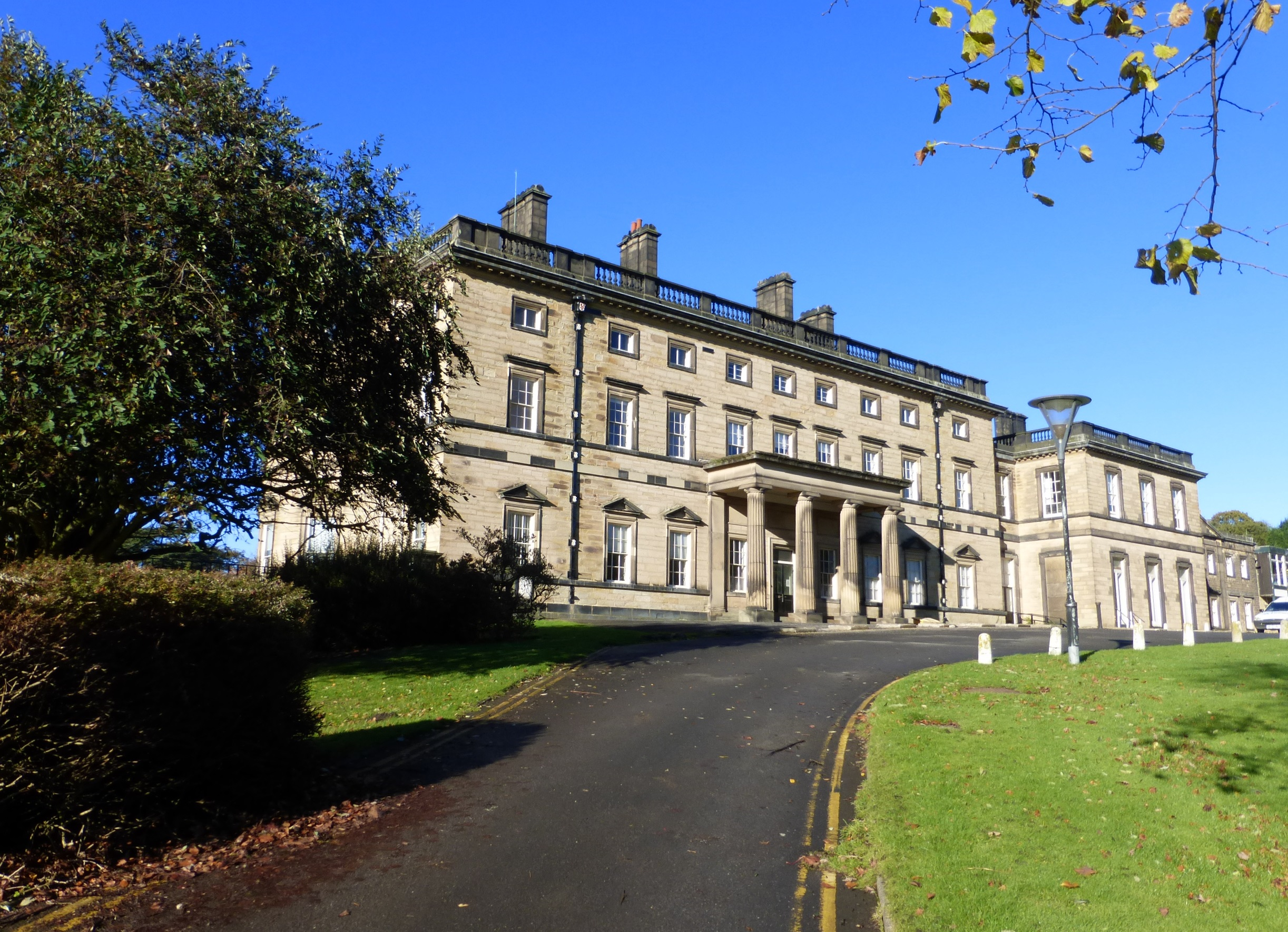
Bretton Hall, Yorkshire

In about 1720, with the assistance of James Moyser, he built the surviving Bretton Hall, which replaced an earlier house on the site.

== Career ==
Wentworth was selected to serve as High Sheriff of Yorkshire from 1722 to 1724.

He was returned as a Member of Parliament for Malton by Thomas Watson-Wentworth at a by-election on 19 May 1731. He voted regularly with the Government. He was returned again for Malton at the 1734 general election. In 1737 he found himself in an awkward political situation. He was asked on behalf of the Prince of Wales to support a motion opposed by the Government which proposed an increase in the Prince's allowance and was in great consternation as to what course of action to take. Finally, he supported the Prince which upset his patron's brother Thomas Wentworth and left him to regret his action, claiming he was tricked. He did not vote on the Spanish convention in 1739 nor on the Place Bill in 1740. He was not put up as a candidate at the 1741 general election.

== Marriage and children ==
On 23 June 1720 in St Paul's Cathedral he married Diana Blackett, a daughter of Sir William Blackett, 1st Baronet, MP, of Newcastle upon Tyne. By his wife he had five sons and four daughters, including:

- Sir Thomas Wentworth Blackett, 5th Baronet (1726–1792), third and only surviving son and heir, who later assumed the surname Blackett.
- Diana Wentworth, the eldest daughter, wife of Godfrey Bosville of Gunthwaite in Yorkshire, and mother of William Bosville.

== Death and succession ==
Wentworth died on 1 March 1763 and was buried at Bretton. He was succeeded in the baronetcy by his third and only surviving son Sir Thomas Wentworth Blackett, 5th Baronet, who later assumed the surname Blackett.

Parliament of Great Britain
Preceded by Henry Finch; Wardell Westby	Member of Parliament for Malton; 1731–1741; With: Henry Finch	Succeeded by Henry Finch; Lord James Cavendish
Baronetage of England
Preceded by Matthew Wentworth	Baronet (of West Bretton); 1706-1763	Succeeded by Thomas Wentworth Blackett
