= Richard Gascoigne =

English antiquarian

Richard Gascoigne (bapt. 27 May 1579 – 23 August 1661 x 24 March 1664) was an English antiquarian.

== Biography ==
Gascoigne was baptised on 27 May 1579 at St Mary the Virgin, Shenfield, Essex. He was the fourth son of George Gascoigne (1531?–1620), a barrister and his wife Mary (née Stokesley; daughter of John Stokesley). At one point George had been of Old Hurst, Huntingdonshire. His family was ultimately descended from one Nicholas Gascoigne, younger brother of Chief Justice Sir William Gascoigne (c. 1350–1419). Richard Gascoigne was also distantly related to Thomas Wentworth, 1st Earl of Strafford, a relation he took some pride in.

Gascoigne attended Jesus College, Cambridge as a pensioner, admitted on 21 October 1594 and graduating in the Lent term of 1599. He was forced to leave in September 1599 due to health troubles, later claiming he would have stayed on otherwise and become a fellow.

Gascoigne resided, for most of his life, in Bramham Biggan, Yorkshire; near the end, he moved to Little Turnstile, Lincoln's Inn Fields in London. Gascoigne often found himself in poverty during his life, incarcerated several times in debtor's prisons. He married one Elizabeth Colles at an unknown date. He took on John, a son of his elder brother, Sir Nicholas, as a ward at some point.

Gascoigne composed his will on 23 August 1661. This will made no mention of Elizabeth, suggesting she had predeceased him at that point, but disparaged his ward, John at length for apparently causing his financial troubles. The will was probated by his landlady Frances Dimmock on 24 March 1664, who was also named as his executor and residuary legatee. His date of death is not known, but must have been between when his will was composed and probated.

== Work ==
Gascoigne was a pedigree-maker, compiling such documents for his Yorkshire relatives and neighbours. He charged high fees for this work, apparently not always to great success; in his will, he complains of an outstanding debt from Sir Thomas Darby over one £100 pedigree. This pedigree was eventually pawned to Dimmock for £30.

== Legacy ==
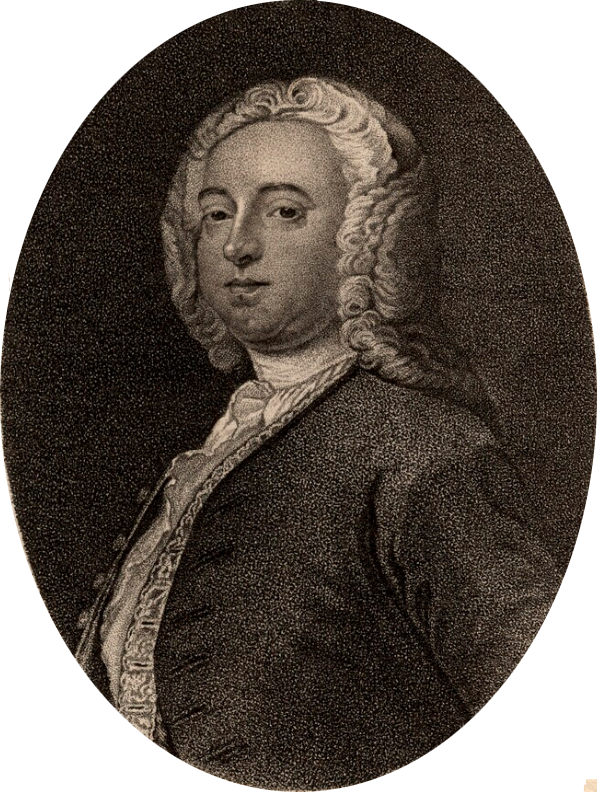
William Oldys, Norroy King of Arms and witness to the destruction of "six or seven great chests" of Gascoigne's papers.

During his lifetime, Gascoigne spent much time and money collecting antiquarian documents. In his will, he left his collection of books to Jesus College, Cambridge. Fifty-seven titles still remain at that College, alongside a personal memorandum from Gascoigne, giving instructions to future conservators. One work, Augustine Vincent's 1621 annotated copy of Ralph Brooke's work on the English nobility, he specifically noted as of considerable value.

Gascoigne also left a sizable collection of pedigrees and seals to his cousin, Thomas; his portrait of Lord Strafford to Dimmock; and the rest of his manuscripts, books, and transcripts to William Wentworth, 2nd Earl of Strafford. Strafford kept them at his country house, Wentworth Woodhouse, until 1695, when he bequeathed them in his will to his nephew, Thomas Watson-Wentworth. These thereafter passed to his son, also named Thomas Watson-Wentworth. The younger Watson-Wentworth burnt a large portion of Gascoigne's manuscripts when he was about to be created Baron Malton. This destruction, eyewitness Norroy King of Arms William Oldys recorded in his diary, was encouraged by Watson-Wentworth's attorney, who feared the pedigrees could harm his client's claim to the Wentworth-Woodhouse estate.

Oldys's diary also reveals the respect in which Gascoigne's work was held by Oldys's peers, and the horror at the "literary holocaust" that Watson-Wentworth committed. Of the "six or seven great chests full of the said deeds, &c, some of them as old as the conquest", Oldys managed to rescue a small number of rolls and manuscripts, and a smaller number of these have survived to the present day, held among collections in Yorkshire, London, and Oxford.
