= William Palmes =

English landowner and Whig politician

William Palmes (c. 1638–1718), of Lindley, North Yorkshire and Ashwell, Rutland was an English landowner and Whig politician who sat in the English and British House of Commons between 1668 and 1713.

== Early life and family ==
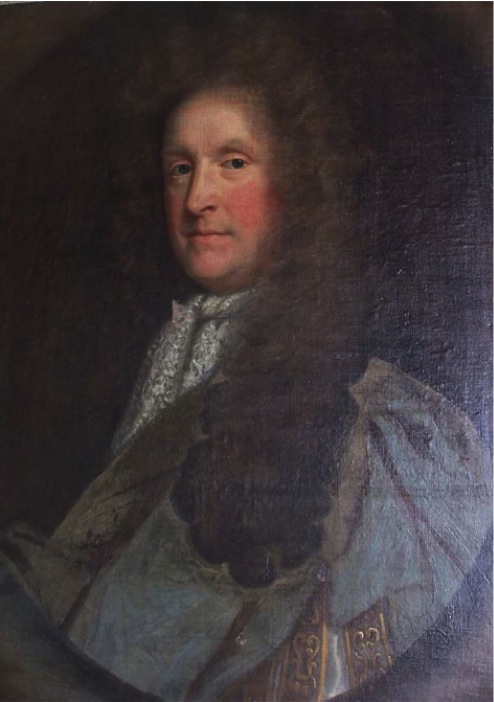
William Palmes of Lindley

Palmes was the second son of Sir Brian Palmes and his wife Mary Tevery, the daughter of Gervase Tevery of Stapleford. He was educated at Wadham College, Oxford between 7 November 1655 and 1659. He succeeded his brother to the family estates in 1657. On 15 July 1663 he married the Hon. Mary Eure, younger daughter and co-heiress of William Eure (d.1645) of Malton, 6th Baron Eure.

== Political career ==
Palmes was appointed High Sheriff of Rutland for May–November 1662. He was elected MP for Malton in a by-election on 6 October 1668 and was subsequently returned as MP for Malton until 1681. He was returned again for Malton at the 1689 English general election and held the seat until the 1713 British general election.

== Death and legacy ==
Palmes fell into financial difficulties and sold the manor of Malton in 1713. Little is known of his last years, but he may have been in the Fleet prison, as he was buried at St Martin, Ludgate on 5 February 1716. He and his wife had four sons and four daughters, but were survived by just one daughter, Elizabeth, who married Sir William Strickland, 3rd Baronet, of Boynton.

Parliament of England
Preceded by Thomas Hebblethwaite; Sir Thomas Gower	Member of Parliament for Malton; 1668–1681; With: Sir Thomas Gower 1668-1673; James Hebblethwaite 1673-1679; Sir Watkinson Payler 1679-1681	Succeeded by Hon. Thomas Fairfax; Thomas Worsley
Preceded by Hon. Thomas Fairfax; Thomas Worsley	Member of Parliament for Malton; 1689–1707; With: Sir William Strickland 1689-1698; Thomas Worsley 1698-1701; Sir William Strickland 1701-1707	Succeeded by Parliament of Great Britain
Parliament of Great Britain
Preceded by Parliament of England	Member of Parliament for Malton; 1707–1713; With: Sir William Strickland 1707-1708; William Strickland 1708-1713	Succeeded by Thomas Watson-Wentworth; William Strickland
