= Philip Howard (died 1686) =

English soldier and politician

Sir Philip Howard (c 1631 – April 1686) was an English soldier and politician who sat in the House of Commons between 1659 and 1679.

Howard was the son of Sir William Howard (died 1642) of Naworth Castle, Cumberland. In 1659, he was elected Member of Parliament for Malton in the Third Protectorate Parliament. He was a captain of the Life Guards from January 1660 until his death. He was commissioner for militia for Yorkshire in March 1660. In April 1660 he was elected MP for Marlton again in the Convention Parliament.

As commander of Monck's guards, he met the King at Dover, and was knighted on 27 May 1660. He was a J.P. for the North Riding of Yorkshire from July 1660 until his death. In August 1660 he was commissioner for assessment for Westminster and commissioner for sewers, Westminster. He was elected MP for Carlisle for the Cavalier Parliament in 1661. He was commissioner for assessment for Cumberland from 1661 to 1680 and for Carlisle from 1663 to 1664. He was JP for Westminster from 1665 to his death and a Deputy Lieutenant for Kent from 1668 to 1672. Howard was in partnership with Francis Watson invention for sheathing hulls with lead. They were granted a patent of monopoly for 14 years in 1668, but sought an extension to 31 years, which required a private Act.

From 1671 to 1674, Howard was receiver of hearth-tax for Kent and farmer of excise in South Wales. He was a JP for Kent from 1672 to his death and commissioner for assessment for Westminster from 1673 to 1674. He served with the French army in the spring of 1674. In 1677 he was a member off the Royal Fishery Company. He was re-elected MP for Carlisle for the two parliaments in 1679. He owned a plantation in Jamaica and in 1685 was appointed governor of Jamaica.

== Death ==
Howard died in England at the age of about 56 and was buried in Westminster Abbey although he was said to have been reconciled to Rome on his deathbed.

== Family ==
Howard married by licence on 23 April 1668, Elizabeth Baker widow of Sir John Baker, 3rd Baronet, of Sissinghurst and daughter of Sir Robert Newton, 1st Baronet of London. They had one son. Howard was the brother of Charles Howard, 1st Earl of Carlisle.

Parliament of England
Preceded by Not represented in 2nd Protectorate Parliament	Member of Parliament for Malton; 1659; With: Sir George Marwood, 1st Baronet	Succeeded by Richard Darley
Preceded by Richard Darley	Member of Parliament for Malton; 1660; With: Thomas Hebblethwaite	Succeeded by Thomas Danby; Thomas Hebblethwaite
Preceded by William Briscoe; Jeremiah Tolhurst	Member of Parliament for Carlisle; 1661–1681; With: Christopher Musgrave	Succeeded by Viscount Morpeth; Christopher Musgrave
Military offices
New regiment	Captain and Colonel of the Duke of Albemarle's Troop of Horse Guards; 1659–1685	Succeeded by The Duke of Northumberland
