= Ebelthite =

Ebelthite is a fairly rare English surname. There are no records of the Ebelthite surname prior to 1720, but it is believed to be a variation of the surname Hebblethwaite. Hebblethwaite is a place name near Sedbergh, and while the full origin of that name is uncertain, the 'thwaite' element is from the Old Norse þveit for a piece of land or paddock.

== Distribution ==
Ebelthite families can be found in and around London in England, and also family clusters in Hertfordshire, Buckinghamshire, Bedfordshire, Lincolnshire, Derbyshire and Kent, going back to 1720.

There is an Ebelthite family in South Africa (who emigrated there around 1840), some in Australia, and very small families in Canada and the United States. They all appear to have emigrated from England.

== Variations ==
Variations of the name Ebelthite may also be Ebblewhit, Ebblethait, Ablethwaite, Aplewhite, Ebelwhite, Abtewhite, Eblethwyte, Ebblethwaite, Ebblewight, Applethwait, Ebelwite, Hebblethwaite, Hebblewaite, Hebblewhite, Hepplewhite, Ebblewhite and Hiblethwaite. The surname Ebelthite, and variants Ebblethwaite, Eblethite and Eblethwaite, are registered with the Guild of One-Name Studies.

== Heraldry ==
In 1570 Arms were granted to James Heblethwayte of Malton, Yorkshire by Sir G. Dethick, Garter King of Arms. Burke's General Armory notes the Arms for Heblethwayte of Sedbergh & Malton, Yorkshire as:

Arms: Agent two pallets Azure on a canton Or a mullet pierced Sable.

Crest: Out of a ducal coronet Or a demi wolf rampant ermines.

In the 1890s the College of Arms, London, granted Arms to Ernest Arthur Ebblewhite (b. 1867 d.1947) and his heirs. The blazon:

Arms: Per fesse indented Argent and Azure within two pallets as many roses in pale all counterchanged on a canton Gules a mullet of six points pierced of the first.

Crest: On a wreath of the colours a demi-wolf rampant ermine charged on the shoulder with a mullet as in the Arms and holding between the paws a lyre Or.

Motto: En Avant

== List of persons with the surname ==
- Colin Ebelthite, professional Australian tennis player
