= John Purvey (MP) =

16th-century English politician

John Purvey (by 1525 – 21 April 1583), of Wormley, Hertfordshire, was an English politician.

He was a member (MP) of the parliament of England for Huntingdon in October 1553, Horsham in November 1554, Hertfordshire in 1558, and Higham Ferrers in 1559 and 1563.
