= Boynton Hall =

Country House in Boynton, East Riding of Yorkshire, England

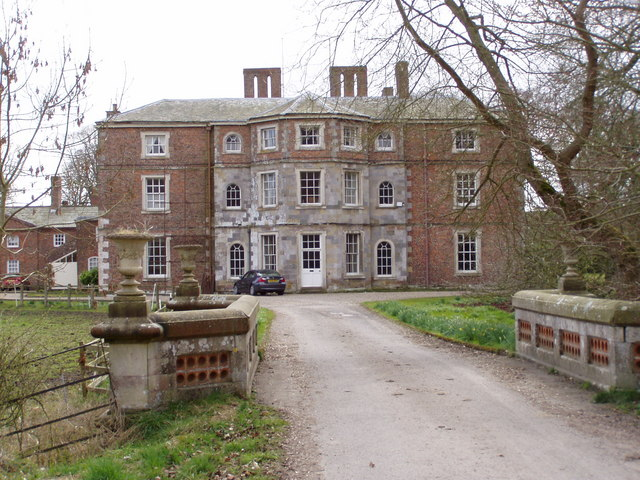
- Interactive map of the Boynton Hall area

General information
- Type: Country House
- Location: Boynton, near Bridlington East Riding of Yorkshire
- Coordinates: 54.09358°N 0.26195°W
- OS grid: TA139678
- Construction started: 16th century

Technical details
- Floor count: 3

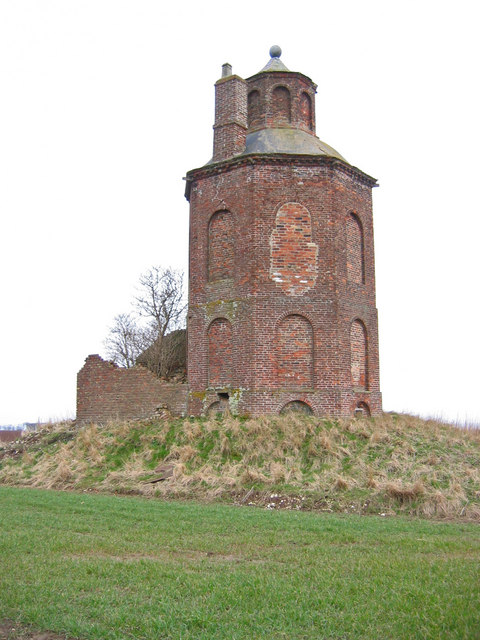
Carnaby Temple

Boynton Hall is a country house in the village of Boynton near Bridlington, East Riding of Yorkshire, England. It is a Grade I listed building.

Originally constructed in the late 16th century, the house has been remodelled several times. It stands within an associated park, whose features include a walled garden and the Carnaby Temple folly (known locally as the Pepperpot). Other buildings, such as the Dairy, the Pigeon House, and the Lodge, are Grade II listed buildings.

== History ==
The house was acquired in 1549 by William Strickland of Marske, who extended it into an H-shaped building with a central hall. Strickland was reputed to have sailed to America with Sebastian Cabot and to have introduced the turkey to England and was twice MP for Scarborough.

It passed down to his grandson, the Parliamentarian Sir William Strickland, 1st Baronet who was MP for Hedon in the Long Parliament from 1640 to 1653. It descended via Sir William Strickland, 3rd Baronet, MP to Sir William Strickland, 4th Baronet, MP, who commissioned both Lord Burlington and William Kent to carry out work on the Hall. Further modifications were done by the 4th Baronet in 1684. In 1720 an extra floor was added with a new slate roof and in the 1760s the front of the house was infilled by the York architect John Carr.

The 7th Baronet changed his name to Cholmley in 1865 to inherit the estates, including Howsham Hall, of Nathaniel Cholmley, but his son Sir Charles Strickland, 8th Baronet reverted to the traditional surname. The direct Strickland line failed in 1938 on the death of Sir Walter Strickland, 9th Baronet (who had renounced the title and left the country) and the Hall passed to the Strickland-Constable branch of the family. They sold it in the 1950s.

The house was then bought back in the 1980s by a family member, Richard Marriott, and has since been restored.

== Architecture ==
=== House ===
Boynton Hall is built of red brick and stone, on a chamfered stone plinth, with diapering in burnt brick, stone dressings, quoins, moulded string courses, a moulded eaves cornice and hipped slate roofs. The main front has three storeys and seven bays, the middle five bays projecting slightly, and the middle three bays canted. The central doorway has an eared architrave and a rectangular fanlight. The windows are sashes in eared architraves, those on the second and sixth bay with round-headed arches. The garden front has three storeys and five bays, a moulded cornice and a pediment. In the centre is a doorway with Tuscan pilasters and an entablature, above it is a Venetian window with Doric pilasters and an entablature, over which is a Diocletian window.

=== Garden House ===
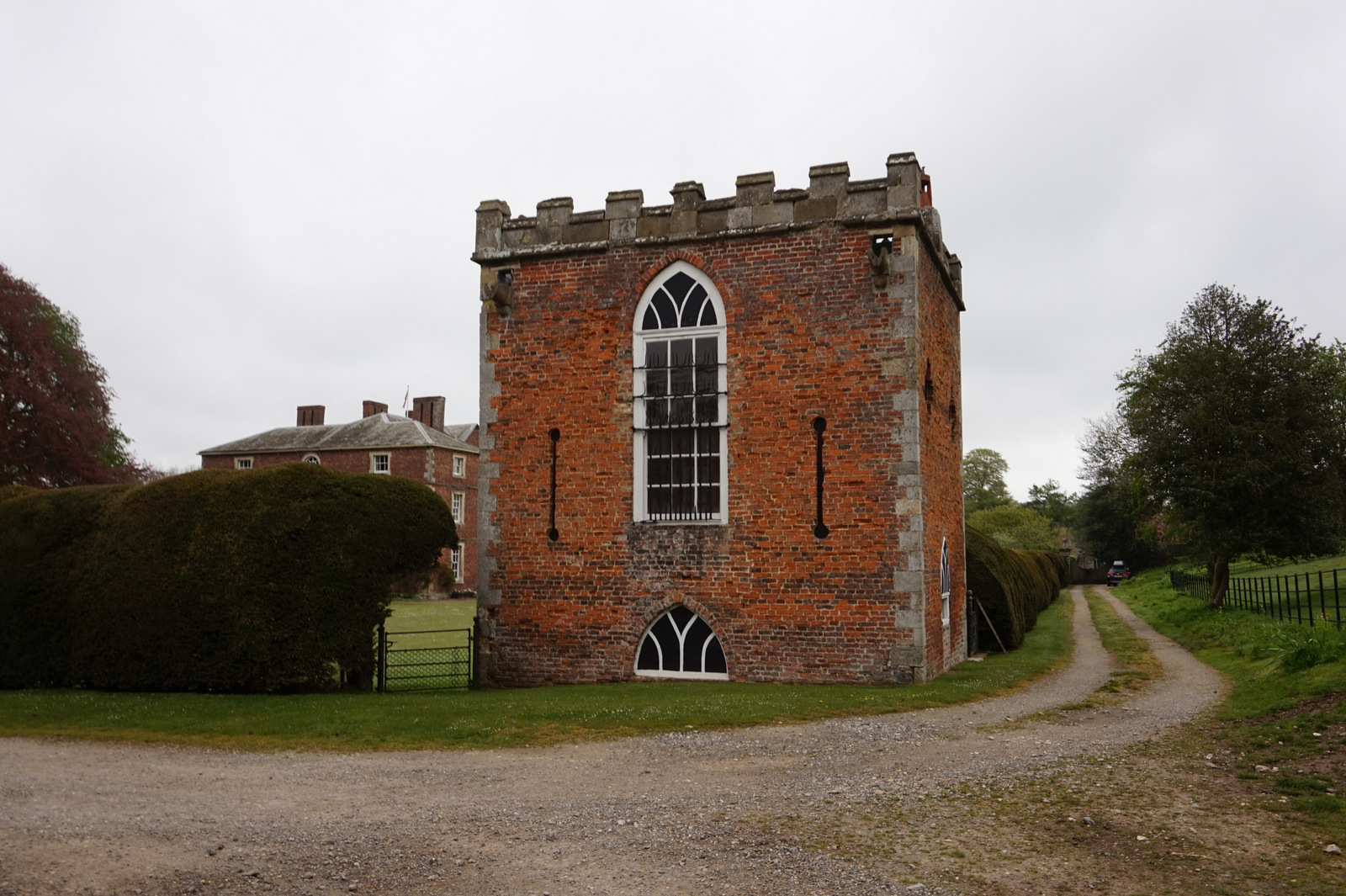
The Garden House

The Garden House was built in the 16th century, remodelled in the early 18th century, and Gothicised in about 1770. It is in brick, with stone dressings, quoins, and an embattled parapet. There is one storey and a basement, and a square plan. Steps lead up to a doorway in a pointed brick arch, it is flanked by blank pointed arches, and above is a blank star-shaped opening. On the right front is a doorway to the basement with a chamfered surround, a blocked rectangular opening and a pointed sash window. The left front has a blank quatrefoil.

=== Home Farm ===
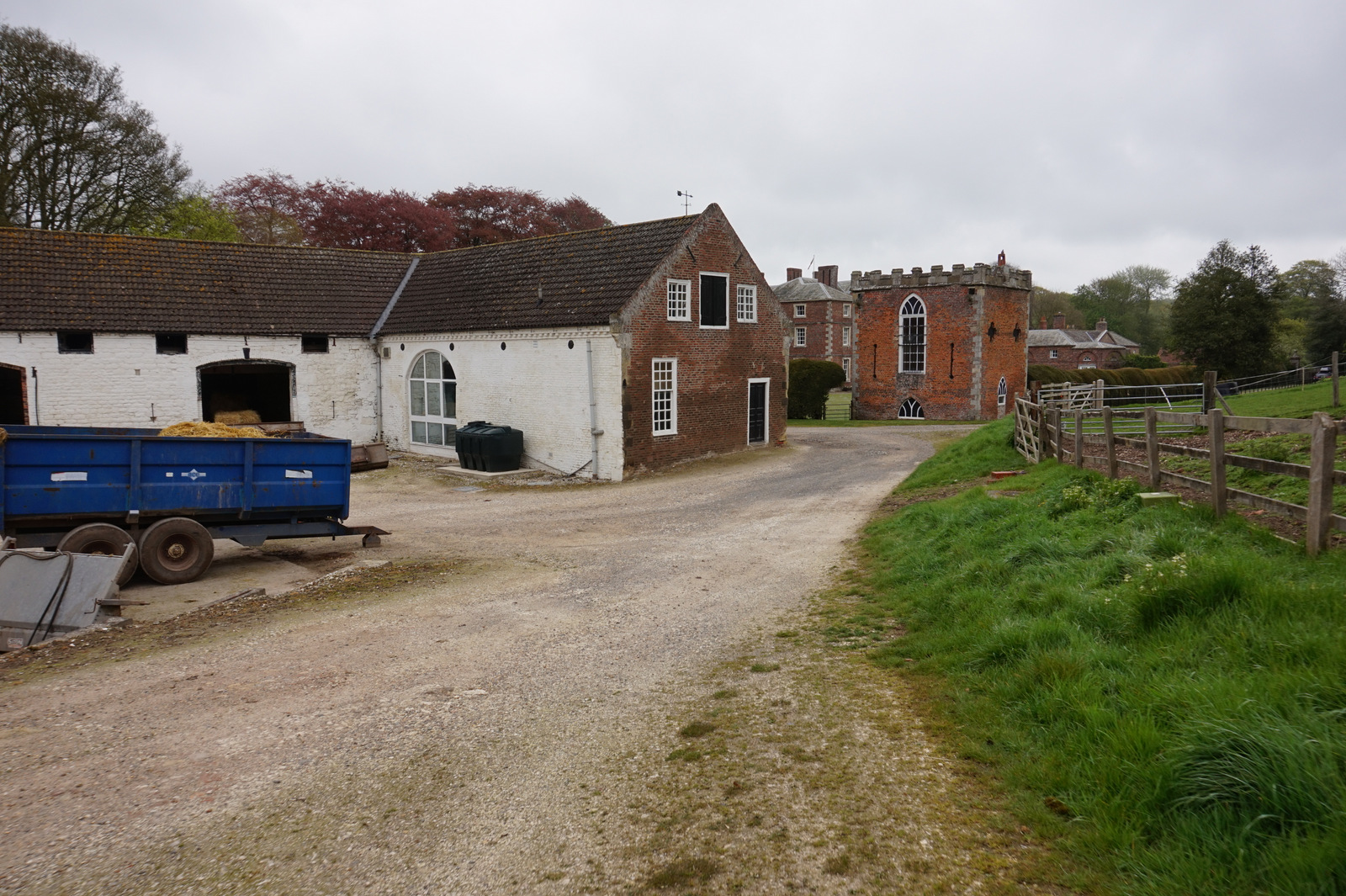
The main building of Home Farm

Home Farm, in the grounds of Boynton Hall, was originally built in the early 18th century as stables. The building is built of brick, with stone dressings, quoins, a dentilled eaves cornice, and a pantile roof, hipped on the right, and with tumbled-in brick on the raised left gable with shaped kneelers. There is a single storey and an L-shaped plan, with a front range of five bays. The round-headed doorway has a stone surround with impost blocks and a fanned keystone. The windows are sashes under gauged brick arches.

== See also ==
- Grade I listed buildings in the East Riding of Yorkshire
- Listed buildings in Boynton, East Riding of Yorkshire
