= Wardell Westby =

Wardell George Westby (died 1756), of Ravenfield, Yorkshire, was a British politician who sat in the House of Commons from 1727 to 1731.

Westby was the eldest son of Thomas Westby, MP of Ravenfield and his first wife Margaret Wardell, daughter of George (Matthew?) Wardell of Holderness, Yorkshire. He married Charlotte Darcy, daughter of Hon. John Darcy on 30 May 1723, on which occasion his father gave up to him the Ravenfield estate, which had been in the family since the early seventeenth century.

At the 1727 British general election Westby was returned as Member of Parliament for Malton on the Wentworth Woodhouse interest. He voted with the Government and in 1731 he was appointed Commissioner of customs. He then vacated his seat, retaining the customs post for the rest of his life. He was also appointed a director of the Royal African Company in 1731.

Westby succeeded his father in. 1747 but he was forced to sell Ravenfield in 1748 on account of his wife's extravagance. In 1749 he also sold a house at 5 Whitehall Yard, London. He died on 9 December 1756, leaving one daughter who married a cousin of the Earl of Egmont in 1750. Westby's widow died in Great Marlborough Street on 10 February 1760, and of his daughter it was said ‘Let the remainer of her unhappy story be left in oblivion’.

Parliament of Great Britain
Preceded by Henry Finch; Thomas Watson-Wentworth	Member of Parliament for Malton; 1727–1731; With: Henry Finch	Succeeded by Henry Finch; William Wentworth
