= Hebblethwaite =

Hebblethwaite is a surname. Notable people with the surname include:

- James Hebblethwaite (1857–1921), English-born Australian poet, teacher and clergyman
- Margaret Hebblethwaite (born 1951), British writer, journalist, activist and religious worker
- Peter Hebblethwaite (1930–1994), British journalist and biographer
- Thomas Hebblethwaite (1629–1668), English politician
