= Listed buildings in Boynton, East Riding of Yorkshire =

Boynton is a civil parish in the county of the East Riding of Yorkshire, England. It contains 16 listed buildings that are recorded in the National Heritage List for England. Of these, two are listed at Grade I, the highest of the three grades, one is at Grade II*, the middle grade, and the others are at Grade II, the lowest grade. The parish contains the village of Boynton and the surrounding area. The most important buildings are St Andrew's Church and Boynton Hall, both of which are listed at Grade I. Most of the other listed buildings are associated with these, and the rest include a farmhouse and barn, and a house.

== Key ==
Grade	Criteria
I	Buildings of exceptional interest, sometimes considered to be internationally important
II*	Particularly important buildings of more than special interest
II	Buildings of national importance and special interest

== Buildings ==
Name and location	Photograph	Date	Notes	Grade
St Andrew's Church; 54.09513°N 0.26357°W		15th century	The oldest part of the church is the tower, with the rest being rebuilt in 1768–70. The tower is in stone and the rest of the church is in brick with stone dressings, and a tile roof. The church consists of a nave, a chancel and a west tower. The tower has three stages, a moulded plinth, diagonal buttresses, string courses, and a two-light west window incorporating a doorway. On the south front is a canopied niche with a statue. Above are two-light bell openings with hood moulds, and an embattled parapet with corner pinnacles.	I
Garden House, Boynton Hall; 54.09291°N 0.26212°W		16th century	The building was remodelled in the early 18th century, and Gothicised in about 1770. It is in brick, with stone dressings, quoins, and an embattled parapet. There is one storey and a basement, and a square plan. Steps lead up to a doorway in a pointed brick arch, it is flanked by blank pointed arches, and above is a blank star-shaped opening. On the right front is a doorway to the basement with a chamfered surround, a blocked rectangular opening and a pointed sash window. The left front has a blank quatrefoil.	II*
Boynton Hall; 54.09358°N 0.26178°W		Late 16th century	A country house in red brick and stone, on a chamfered stone plinth, with diapering in burnt brick, stone dressings, quoins, moulded string courses, a moulded eaves cornice and hipped slate roofs. The main front has three storeys and seven bays, the middle five bays projecting slightly, and the middle three bays canted. The central doorway has an eared architrave and a rectangular fanlight. The windows are sashes in eared architraves, those on the second and sixth bay with round-headed arches. The garden front has three storeys and five bays, a moulded cornice and a pediment. In the centre is a doorway with Tuscan pilasters and an entablature, above it is a Venetian window with Doric pilasters and an entablature, over which is a Diocletian window.	I
Pigeon house, Boynton Hall; 54.09323°N 0.26081°W	—	17th century	The pigeon house is in stone and brick on a high hollow-chamfered plinth, incorporating re-used medieval masonry and sculptured fragments, with a slate roof. There are two storeys, a square plan, and one bay. The doorway is flat-headed with a chamfered surround, above which is a carved female head, and a moulded string course. Inside the upper floor are nesting boxes.	II
Gate piers southwest of Boynton Hall; 54.09329°N 0.26114°W	—	c. 1700	The gate piers are in red brick with stone dressings and a square plan. Each pier has a moulded base, rusticated quoins, an architrave with bead and pellet decoration, a deep moulded cornice, and a stepped and chamfered pyramidal cap with a goblet finial. There are brick pilastered rebates for the gates, the left with a scrolled capital.	II
Woollen manufactory, Boynton Hall; 54.09454°N 0.25660°W	—	c. 1700	The building, later a storehouse, is in brick with a dentilled brick cornice, and a hipped pantile roof with tumbled-in brick on the half-gables. The main block has two storeys and three bays, flanked by lower wings with two storeys and three bays. Between the bays are pilasters, the doorway is in the centre, above it is a loading door, and there are oculi in the flanking bays and wings, and at the rear.	II
Gate piers north of Boynton Hall; 54.09498°N 0.26384°W		Early 18th century	The gate piers at the north entrance to the grounds of the house are in rusticated stone with a square plan. Each pier has a chamfered plinth, a moulded cornice, over pilasters carrying stepped and chamfered capping and an ogival pyramidal and ball finial.	II
Outbuilding west of Garden House, Boynton Hall; 54.09288°N 0.26271°W		Early 18th century	Originally stables, later used for other purposes, the building is in brick, with stone dressings, quoins, a dentilled eaves cornice, and a pantile roof, hipped on the right, and with tumbled-in brick on the raised left gable with shaped kneelers. There is a single storey and an L-shaped plan, with a front range of five bays. The round-headed doorway has a stone surround with impost blocks and a fanned keystone. The windows are sashes under gauged brick arches.	II
Vicarage; 54.09538°N 0.26385°W		Early 18th century	The house is in red brick and chalk, with a floor band, a stepped eaves cornice, and a pantile roof with a raised gable and kneelers. There are two storeys and attics, and an L-shaped plan with a front range of three bays, and a rear wing. The doorway has a rectangular fanlight, the windows are horizontally sliding sashes, and all the openings have flat brick arches. There are two canted bay windows with ramped stone coped parapets, and pyramid and ball finials.	II
Stable block north of the Vicarage; 54.09574°N 0.26414°W	—	Early 18th century	The stable block is in red brick, with a band, a stepped brick eaves cornice, and a pantile roof with tumbled-in brick to the crowstepped gable on the left. There are two storeys, a rectangular plan, and three bays. On the front are three doorways with tripartite fanlights under segmental brick heads, and a horizontally sliding sash window.	II
19 Grindale Road; 54.09983°N 0.26532°W	—	18th century	The house is in chalk and brick, and has a pantile roof with raised gables and kneelers. There is one storey and attics, and two bays, and a rear outshut under a catslide roof. On the front are a doorway and two 20th-century windows, and above are two sloping dormers with horizontally sliding sash windows.	II
Bridge west of Boynton Hall; 54.09342°N 0.26285°W		18th century	The bridge, which crosses the Gypsey Race, is in brick with stone facings. It consists of five round arches, increasing in size to the centre, with hood moulds, shaped cutwaters, and a moulded cornice to the ramped deck.	II
Dairy, Boynton Hall; 54.09325°N 0.26066°W	—	c. 1770	The former dairy is in chalk and brick, and has a pantile roof with a raised coped gable and a foliated finial. There are two storeys and a rectangular plan, and it is in Gothic style. The porch on the gabled front has three pointed arches under a lower gable, the doorway has a pointed surround, and above it is a quatrefoil. The upper floor contains two quatrefoils flanking an embrasure.	II
Lodge, Boynton Hall; 54.09488°N 0.26405°W	—	Late 18th century	The lodge is in whitewashed brick and chalk, with a dentilled brick eaves cornice, and tumbled-in brick to the raised gables. There is a single storey and attics, a rectangular plan and five bays. The doorway is in a deep pointed recess, and the windows are horizontally sliding sashes in shallow pointed recesses.	II
Offices, Boynton Hall; 54.09357°N 0.26126°W	—	Late 18th century	The building is in red brick, with a dentilled eaves cornice, and a slate roof. There are two storeys and a U-shaped plan, with a front range of eight bays, and rear extensions. Three of the bays project under a pediment with a dentilled cornice. On the front are three full height round-headed recesses, and a doorway with a rectangular fanlight. Some windows are sashes, some are centrally pivoted, and all have gauged flat brick arches.	II
West Lawn Farmhouse and barn 54.09668°N 0.26462°W		Late 18th century	The house and barn are in chalk, and have tumbled-in brick to the gables. The house has a slate roof, two storeys, five bays, and a rear outshut under a catslide roof. On the ground floor is a doorway with a wooden surround, tripartite horizontally sliding sash windows and a casement window, and the upper floor has smaller sashes. The barn has a pantile roof, a stepped brick eaves cornice, slit vents and a loading door.	II
