= Charles Wentworth-FitzWilliam (MP) =

British politician & cricketer (1826–1894)

The Honorable Charles William Wentworth-FitzWilliam

Member of Parliament for Malton
- In office 1852–1885 Serving with Sir Evelyn Denison (1852-1857); James Brown (1857-1868) (representation reduced to one member 1868)
- Preceded by: Sir Evelyn Denison; John Walbanke-Childers
- Succeeded by: Constituency abolished

Personal details
- Born: 18 September 1826
- Died: 20 December 1894 (aged 68)
- Party: Liberal
- Spouse: Anne Dundas (m. 1854)
- Parents: Charles Wentworth-FitzWilliam (father); Hon. Mary Dundas (mother)
- Relatives: William Wentworth-FitzWilliam (brother); George Wentworth-FitzWilliam (brother)

The Hon. Charles William Wentworth-FitzWilliam (18 September 1826 – 20 December 1894) was a Liberal Party politician and first-class cricketer in the United Kingdom.

Wentworth-FitzWilliam was a younger son of Charles Wentworth-FitzWilliam, 5th Earl FitzWilliam, and the Hon. Mary, daughter of Thomas Dundas, 1st Baron Dundas. William Wentworth-FitzWilliam, 6th Earl FitzWilliam and George Wentworth-FitzWilliam were his elder brothers.

Wentworth-FitzWilliam played first-class cricket for the Marylebone Cricket Club against Cambridge University at Lord's in 1849. Batting twice in the match, he was dismissed by Edward Blore and Alfred Potter for scores of 10 and 4 respectively. He was elected Member of Parliament for Malton in 1852, a seat he held until the constituency was abolished in 1885.

Wentworth-FitzWilliam married his first cousin Anne, daughter of Reverend Thomas Lawrence Dundas, in 1854. He died in December 1894, aged 68. His wife died in December 1925.

Parliament of the United Kingdom
Preceded by Sir Evelyn Denison; John Walbanke-Childers	Member of Parliament for Malton; 1852–1885; With: Sir Evelyn Denison 1852–1857; James Brown 1857–1868 (representation reduced to one member 1868)	Constituency abolished
