= St Andrew's Church, Boynton =

Church in Boynton, East Riding of Yorkshire, England

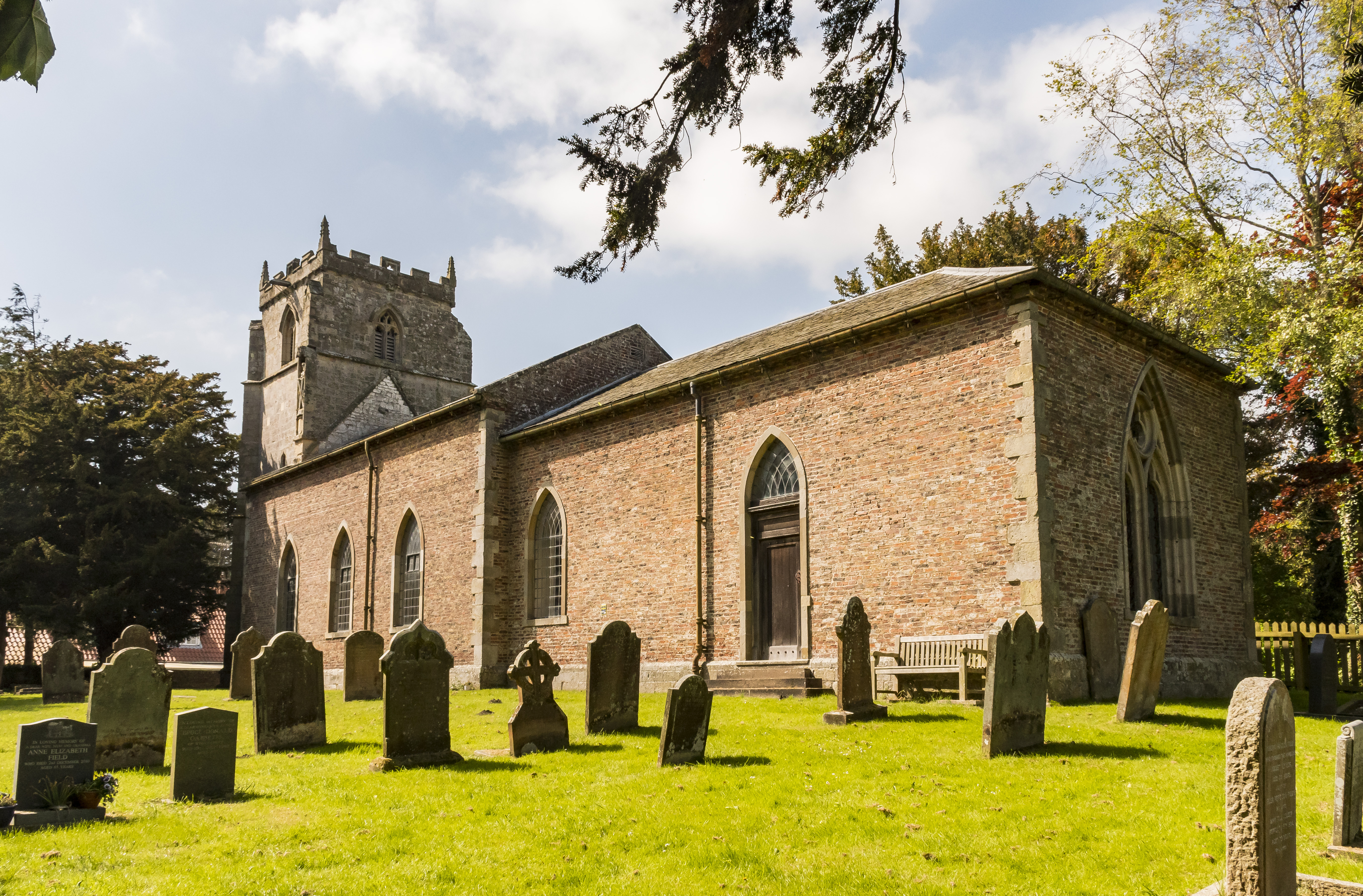
The church, in 2018

St Andrew's Church is the parish church of Boynton, East Riding of Yorkshire, a village in England.

A church in Boynton was first recorded in the 1120s. The oldest part of the current building is the tower, which was constructed in the 15th century. The rest of the church was rebuilt between 1768 and 1770, possibly to a design by John Carr. The interior was partly reordered in 1910 by John Bilson, who also inserted a priests' door. The building was grade I listed in 1966.

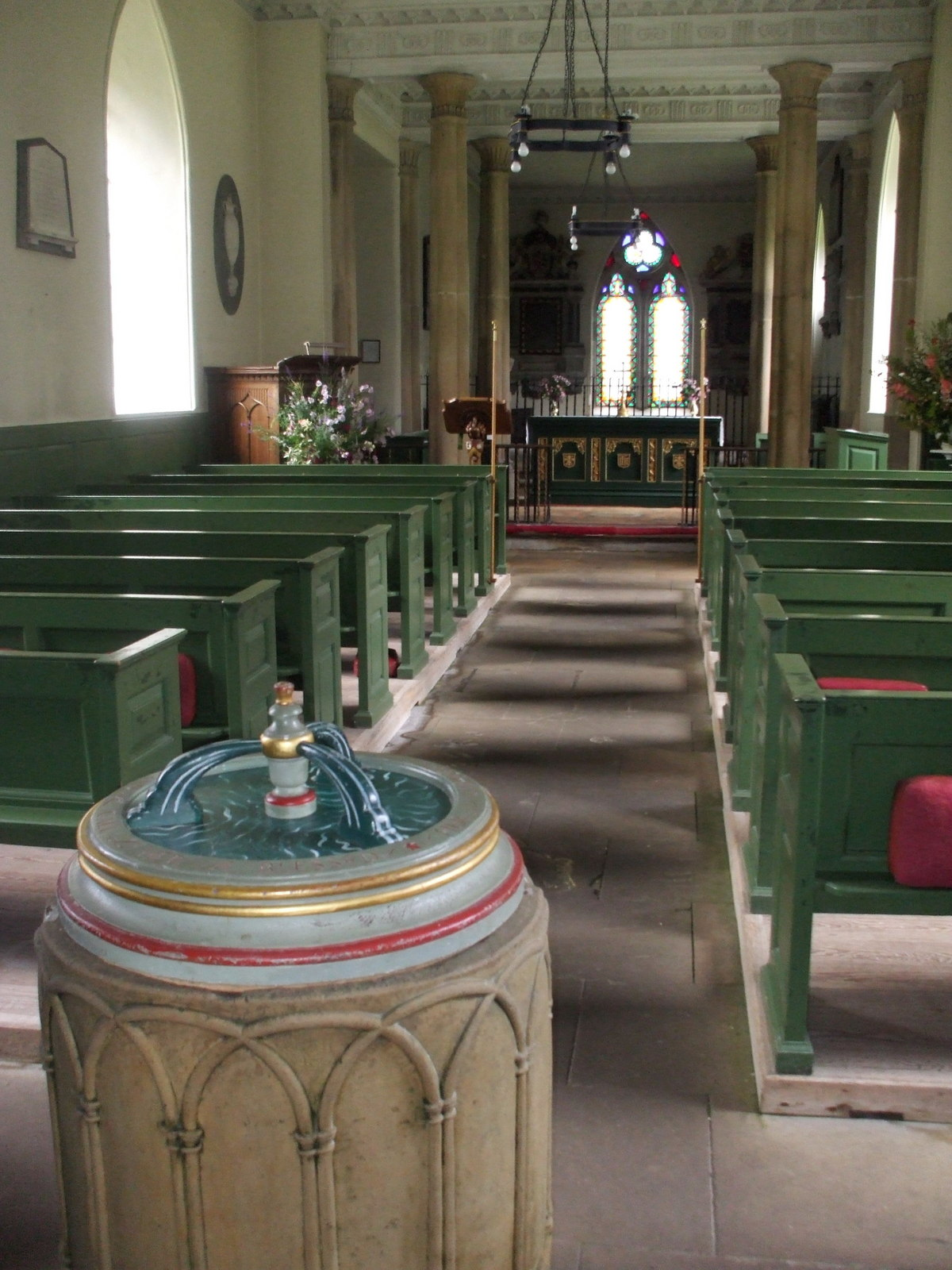
View east in the church, with the font in the foreground

The tower is built of stone and the rest of the church is in brick with stone dressings, and a tile roof. The church consists of a nave, a chancel and a west tower. The tower has three stages, a moulded plinth, diagonal buttresses, string courses, and a two-light west window incorporating a doorway. On the south front is a canopied niche with a statue. Above are two-light bell openings with hood moulds, and an embattled parapet with corner pinnacles. Inside, there is a font which is believed to be 12th century, but which was retooled in the 18th century. There is an 18th-century double chancel screen, 19th-century pews, various wall monuments from the 17th and 18th centuries, and painted glass in the east window, crafted in 1768 by William Peckitt.

== See also ==
- Grade I listed buildings in the East Riding of Yorkshire
- Listed buildings in Boynton, East Riding of Yorkshire
