= Tregonwell Frampton =

English racehorse trainer (1641–1727)

Tregonwell Frampton (1641–12 March 1727) was an English racehorse trainer, known as 'the father of the turf.'

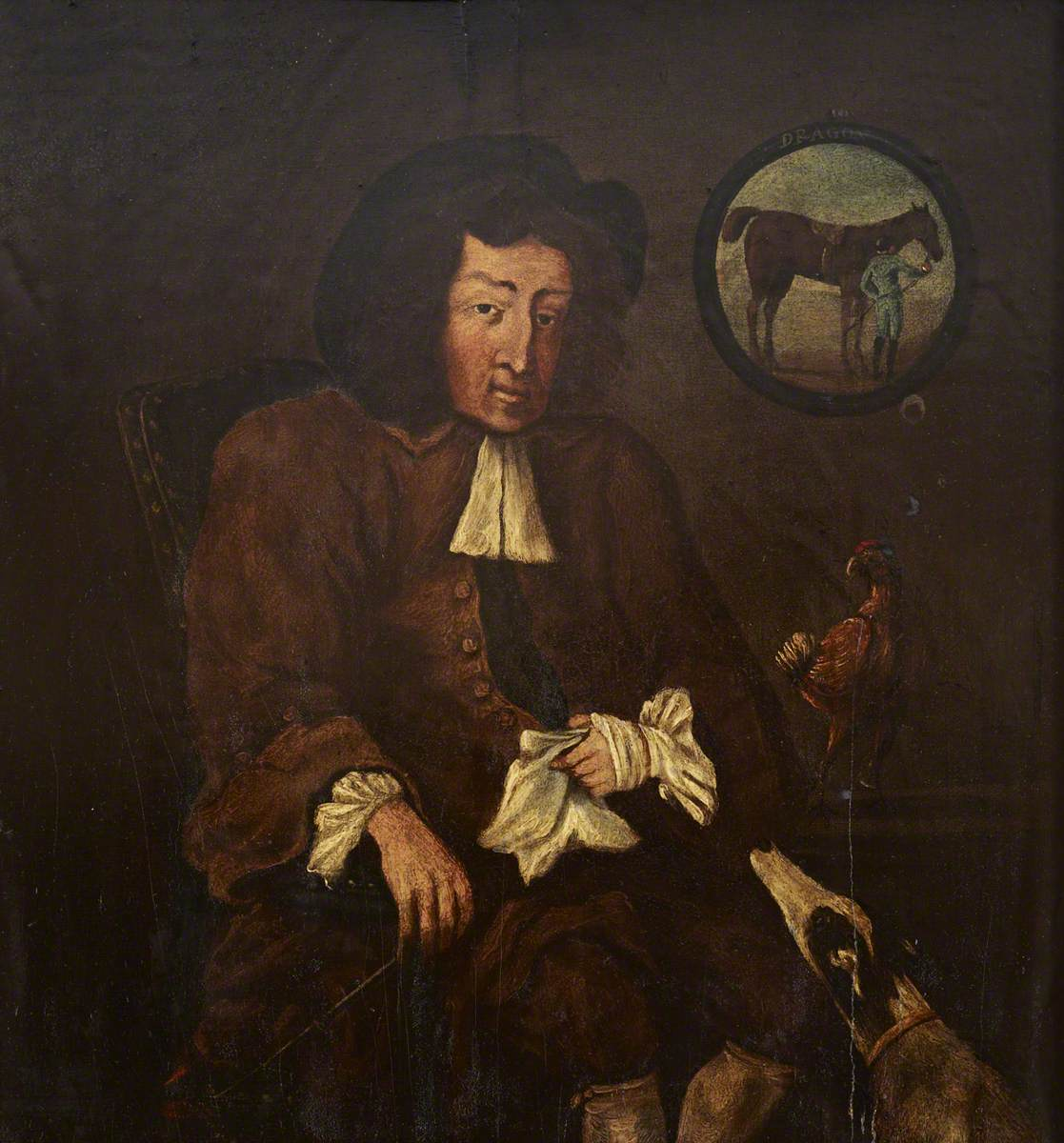
Tregonwell Frampton, after a portrait by John Wootton.

== Life ==
Frampton was born in 1641 at Moreton, Dorset, the fifth son of William Frampton, lord of the manor of Moreton, by his wife, Katharine Tregonwell of Milton Abbas. He is described by William Chafin as being in 1670 the most active pursuer of hawking in the west of England. He was at the same period a regular attendant at race meetings, kept horses in training, and owned a house at Newmarket, though he passed most of the year in Dorset. At Newmarket, he was "keeper of the running horses" to William III, Queen Anne, George I and George II.

== Gambler ==
At Newmarket he acquired a reputation for successful gambling. Henry Coventry, in a despatch dated March 1675, mentions a horse-racing match 'wherein Mr. Frampton, a gentleman of some 120l. rent, is engaged 900l. deep.' Frampton won his money, and in the racing records of the time his name appears more frequently as a winner than a loser, the amounts at stake being higher than was usual. In April 1676, for example, he had two matches in the same week, the one at Newmarket and the other at Salisbury, each for £1,000.

A well-known tradition on Frampton is given by John Hawkesworth in an essay on instances of cruelty to animals; but not from personal knowledge. This story is that Frampton's horse Dragon beat a certain mare, winning a stake of £10,000. On the conclusion of the match the owner of the mare instantly offered to run her on the following day for double the sum against any gelding in the world, and Frampton accepted the challenge. He then castrated Dragon, who was brought out the next day, and again beat the mare, but fell down at the post and died almost immediately. In contradiction, Edward Conway, 1st Earl of Conway, in a letter dated 7 October 1682, says: ‘His majesty's horse Dragon, which carried seven stone, was beaten yesterday by a little horse called Post Boy, carrying four stone, and the masters of that art conclude this top horse of England is spoiled for ever.’ A letter written by James, Duke of York to the Prince of Orange eighteen months after the date of Frampton's alleged cruelty mentions a forthcoming match between the 'famous horses Dragon and Why Not.’

== The Merlin Match ==
On one occasion, Frampton made a match with Sir William Strickland, a Yorkshire baronet, between his own favourite horse and Strickland's, known as Old Merlin. Frampton managed to arrange a private trial between the two at Newmarket, and covertly put 7lbs overweight on his horse for it, and was just beaten. Unbeknown to Frampton, Merlin had also gone into the race carrying overweight and in the race itself, Frampton's horse was again beaten. Frampton's own losses must have been large; but wider interest was excited by the match, which was looked upon as a struggle between the north and south of England. Several estates changed hands after the event, and many gentlemen were ruined. James Christie Whyte's History of British Turf attributes to the scale of these losses the passing of the Act of Parliament forbidding the legal recovery of any sum due for bets above £10.

Frampton, in need of money, made over the family estate, to which he had succeeded on the death of his brother William in 1689, to his cousin Giles Frampton, the next heir, in consideration of £5,000. But the exact dates of both the match and the transfer of property are unknown, though the latter took place before 1702.

== Trainer ==
It was probably in 1695 that Frampton first assumed the duties of the position ascribed to him on his tombstone of 'keeper of the running horses to their sacred majesties William III, Queen Anne, George I and George II,' although it is surmised he may also have performed the role for Charles II and James II. In October of that year he won with the king's horse the town plate at Newmarket, and in the accounts of the master of the horse for the same year there is mention of a payment to him 'for settling the establishment of racehorses at the Green Cloth and Avery, and for a plate at Newmarket.’

In 1700 he first appears in Edward Chamberlayne's Angliæ Notitia as receiving £1,000 per annum as supervisor of the racehorses at Newmarket, for the maintenance of ten boys, and for provisions of hay, oats, bread, and all other necessaries for ten racehorses. From that date until his death he regularly received a salary, apparently being £100 for every horse in training. He trained the royal horses, and made matches for them, and they generally ran in his name.

He continued to breed horses on his own account, some of which he used to dispose of at high prices to the master of the horse, and he remained a gambler. That part of his time which was not given up to horses was devoted to hawking, hare coursing, and cock-fighting. He was particularly successful with his cocks, and his taste was largely shared by William III, who, during his visits to Newmarket, spent afternoons watching his trainer's cocks fight.

== Death ==
Frampton kept his post until his last day, which was 12 March 1727. He was buried in the church of All Saints, Newmarket, where on the south side of the altar was a mural monument of black and white marble inscribed to his memory.

== Reputation ==
The author of Newmarket, or an Essay on the Turf, London, 1771 described him:

He was a known woman hater, passionately fond of horse-racing, cocking, and coursing; remarkable for a peculiar uniformity in his dress, the fashion of which he never changed, and in which, regardless of its uncouth appearance, he would not unfrequently go to court and enquire in the most familiar manner for his master or mistress, the king or queen. Queen Anne used to call him Governor Frampton.

Another writer quoted by Whyte in an account of Newmarket in the reign of Queen Anne, remarked:

There was Mr. Frampton, the oldest, and, as they say, the cunningest jockey in England; one day he lost 1,000 guineas, the next he won 2,000, and so alternately. He made as light of throwing away 500l. or 1,000l. at a time as other men do of their pocket-money, and was perfectly calm, cheerful, and unconcerned when he had lost a thousand pounds as when he won it.

Mark Noble wrote:

a thorough good groom only, yet would have made a good minister of state if he had been trained for it ... Frampton was supposed to be better acquainted with the genealogy of the most celebrated horses than any man of his time. ... Not a splint or sprain, or bad eye, or old broken knee, or pinched foot, or low heel, escaped in the choice of a horse.

On the other hand, he is tersely dismissed by Sir George Etherege in the couplet:—

I call a spade a spade, Eaton a bully,
Frampton a pimp, and brother John a cully.

The time when Frampton was first given the title 'father of the turf' is not known; he was so described in caption to an engraving of his portrait by John Wootton in 1791. Frampton's portrait frequently served as a frontispiece to books on racing, for example in Thomas Henry Taunton's Portraits of Celebrated Racehorses.

== Bibliography ==
- Cawthorne, George James; Herod, Richard S. (1902). Royal Ascot, Its History & Its Associations (PDF). London: A Treherne & Co.
- Whyte, James Christie (1840). History of the British turf, from the earliest period to the present day, Volume I. London: H. Colburn. OL 6544990M.

Attribution

This article incorporates text from a publication now in the public domain: "Frampton, Tregonwell". Dictionary of National Biography. London: Smith, Elder & Co. 1885–1900.
