= William Strickland (navigator) =

16th-century English explorer and politician

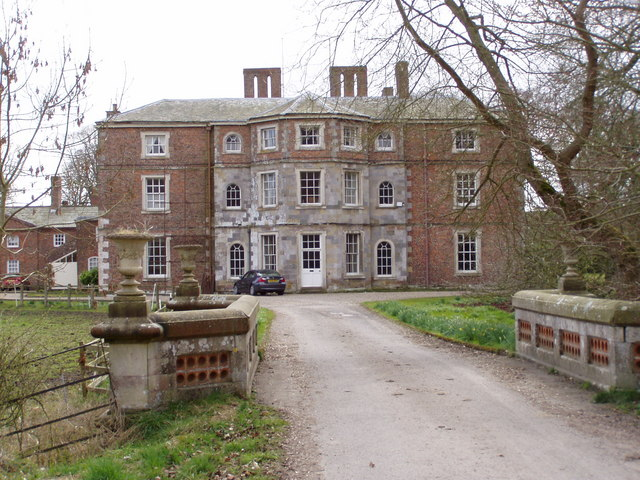
Boynton Hall today - seat of the Strickland baronets

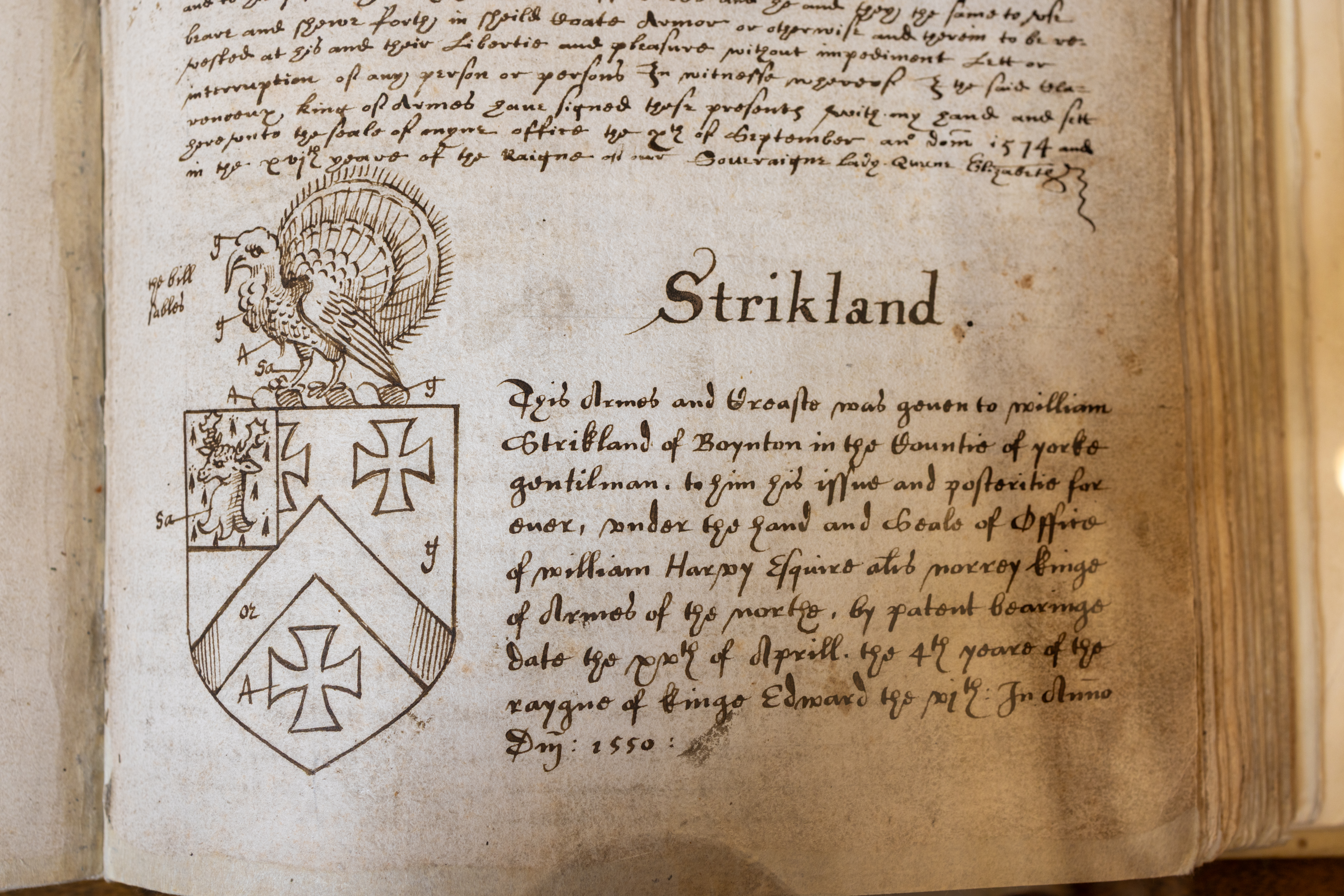
College of Arms grant of arms to William Strickland, thought to be the oldest surviving European depiction of a turkey

William Strickland (died 8 December 1598) was an English landowner who sailed on early voyages of exploration to America and is credited with introducing the turkey into England. In later life he was a prominent Puritan Member of Parliament.

== Early life ==
Strickland was the son of a Yorkshire gentleman, Roger Strickland of Marske, and was probably descended from a junior branch of the Stricklands of Sizergh. As a young man he sailed to the New World as one of Sebastian Cabot's lieutenants, and is generally credited with introducing the turkey to England. The association seems to have been accepted by his contemporaries since, when in 1550 he was granted a coat of arms, it included a "turkey-cock in his pride proper". The official record of his crest in the archives of the College of Arms is said to be the oldest surviving European drawing of a turkey.

Strickland returned to Yorkshire in 1542, and with the proceeds of his voyages bought estates at Wintringham and at Boynton, both in the East Riding of Yorkshire. He seems to have lived the remainder of his life at Place Newton, his house at Wintringham where he is buried, but he had the Norman manor house at Boynton rebuilt as Boynton Hall, and this became the seat of his descendants. The church at Boynton is liberally decorated with the family's turkey crest, most notably in the form of a probably-unique lectern (a 20th-century creation) carved in the form of a turkey rather than the conventional eagle, the bible supported by its outspread tail feathers.

== Parliamentary career ==
In 1558, Strickland was elected to the Parliament of England as the Member of Parliament (MP) for Scarborough, and seems to have proved an able and eloquent advocate of the Puritan cause, earning such nicknames as "Strickland the Stinger" from his political opponents, though the anonymous author of the Simonds d'Ewes diaries described him sardonically as "One Mr Strickland, a grave and ancient man of great zeal, and perhaps (as he himself thought) not unlearned".

Strickland does not seem to have been particularly prominent in his first two parliaments, but came to the forefront in the parliament that met in 1571, in which the Puritan faction was stronger than previously. This time he found himself at the centre of a constitutional crisis, one of Parliament's earliest assertions of its privilege to conduct its proceedings without royal interference with its members.

Strickland spoke on both the first two days of the session, 6 April 1571 and 7 April 1571; on the second of these he put forward a motion to reintroduce six bills to reform the Book of Common Prayer, which had been defeated in the previous parliament; the Speaker allowed the bills to be read, but the Queen had previously directed that Parliament should not debate such matters, and this earned the house a royal reprimand. Then on the last day before the Easter recess, 14 April 1571, Strickland introduced his own bill to reform the prayer book – among other measures it proposed to abolish confirmation, prevent priests from wearing vestments and end the practice of kneeling at the Communion. The bill was given a first reading against the vigorous opposition of the Privy Counsellors present, but after further argument the House voted to petition the Queen for permission to continue discussing the bill before any further action was taken, and the House adjourned.

Strickland was now summoned before the Privy Council, though sources differ on whether he was imprisoned or otherwise menaced; but it seems certain he was forbidden to retake his seat in the Commons. When the House reassembled, one member reported that the Catholics believed he was on trial for his life on heresy charges; but Sir Francis Knollys assured members that he was "neither detained or abused". Nevertheless, the members found it unacceptable that an MP should be prevented from attending except by order of the House itself, and most of the day's proceedings were occupied by a hostile debate when moderate members as well as Strickland's Puritan allies demanded that he should be sent for and heard at the bar of the house. The privy counsellors "whispered together", and the following day Strickland re-appeared triumphantly and, as the D'Ewes journal records, the other members "did, in witness of their joy for the restoration of one of their … members … nominate him [to a] committee".

Strickland was not re-elected immediately following the dissolution of the parliament in 1572, but was returned once more as MP for Scarborough in 1584.

There is some disagreement between historians of the period as to whether Strickland should be considered the prime mover in the controversy he caused, or merely a spokesman of the Puritan faction following a course of action directed by its ringleaders. Strickland was one of 46 MPs who were lampooned by an opponent for speaking together on a motion in 1566, and whom J. E. Neale referred to as "Norton's Choir", after Thomas Norton whom he considered the moving spirit of the group. Neale admits that Strickland was "the hero of this new Parliament [that of 1571]", but says of his most important speeches that "to assume that [they] sprung from Strickland's mind alone would be childish". More recent historians, however, Geoffrey Elton and Conrad Russell, reject the "Norton's Choir" theory.

== Descendants ==
Strickland married Elizabeth Strickland, daughter of Sir Walter Strickland of Sizergh in the County of Cumbria; and they had five children of whom the oldest, Walter, was William's heir. Walter's first son William was born shortly before his grandfather's death and was named after him; he also became a member of parliament, and was created a baronet (of Boynton) in 1641.
