= Malton (constituency) =

Parliamentary constituency in the United Kingdom, 1868–1885

- Former borough constituency for the House of Commons

1640–1885
- Replaced by: Thirsk and Malton; Buckrose

Malton, also called New Malton, was a constituency of the House of Commons of the Parliament of England in 1295 and 1298, and again from 1640, then of the Parliament of Great Britain from 1707 to 1800 and of the Parliament of the United Kingdom from 1801 to 1885. It was represented by two Members of Parliament until 1868, among them the political philosopher Edmund Burke, and by one member from 1868 to 1885.

The constituency was divided between the new Thirsk and Malton division of the North Riding of Yorkshire and the Buckrose division of the East Riding of Yorkshire from 1885.

== Boundaries ==
The constituency consisted of parts of the St Leonard's and St Michael's parishes of New Malton in the North Riding until the Great Reform Act 1832; the borough at that point included 791 houses and had a population of 4,173 in the 1831 census. The Reform Act 1832 expanded the boundaries to include the whole of those two parishes, as well as that of Old Malton and of the adjoining town of Norton in the East Riding, increasing the population to 7,192 and encompassing 1,401 houses.

== Franchise ==
The right of election in Malton was vested in the scot and lot householders of the borough, of whom there were about 800 in 1832. In practice the seats were generally in the gift of the landowner, Earl Fitzwilliam (and were frequently held by one of that family, often by the heir to the Earldom who had the courtesy title Viscount Milton); at an earlier period the borough was similarly dominated by the Watson-Wentworth family, and was used as a form of government patronage when the Marquess of Rockingham was Prime Minister.

== Members of Parliament ==
New Malton re-enfranchised by Parliament in November 1640

=== MPs 1640–1868 ===
Year	First member	First party	Second member	Second party
November 1640	Thomas Hebblethwaite	Royalist	Henry Cholmley	Parliamentarian
November 1644	Hebblethwaite disabled to sit – seat vacant		Henry Cholmley	Parliamentarian
1645	Richard Darley		Henry Cholmley	Parliamentarian
December 1648	Richard Darley		Cholmley excluded in Pride's Purge – seat vacant	
1653	Malton was unrepresented in the Barebones Parliament			
1654,1656	Malton was unrepresented in the First and Second Parliaments of the Protectorate			
January 1659 (Note: The Returning Officer made a double return after a dispute over the franchise: the Committee of Elections and Privileges ruled in favour of Howard and Marwood, and against their opponents Luke Robinson and Robert Lilburne on the grounds that Old Malton as well as New Malton was entitled to vote. (House of Commons Journal, 7 March 1659 ))	Philip Howard		George Marwood	
May 1659	Richard Darley		One seat vacant	
April 1660	Thomas Hebblethwaite		Philip Howard	
April (?) 1661	Thomas Hebblethwaite		Thomas Danby	
December 1661	Thomas Hebblethwaite		Sir Thomas Gower	
1668	William Palmes		Sir Thomas Gower	
1673	William Palmes		James Hebblethwaite	
1679	William Palmes		Sir Watkinson Payler	
1685	Hon. Thomas Fairfax		Thomas Worsley	
1689	William Palmes	Junto Whig	Sir William Strickland	Junto Whig
1698	William Palmes	Junto Whig	Thomas Worsley	
1701	William Palmes	Junto Whig	Sir William Strickland	Junto Whig
1708	William Palmes	Junto Whig	William Strickland	Whig
1713	Thomas Watson-Wentworth		William Strickland	Whig
1715	Thomas Watson-Wentworth		Thomas Watson-Wentworth (the younger)	
1722	Sir William Strickland	Whig	Thomas Watson-Wentworth (the younger)	
1724 by-election	Henry Finch		Thomas Watson-Wentworth (the younger)	
1727	Henry Finch		Wardell Westby	
1731 by-election	Henry Finch		Sir William Wentworth	
May 1741	Henry Finch		Lord James Cavendish	
Dec 1741 by-election	Henry Finch		John Mostyn	
1761 by-election	Savile Finch	Whig	John Mostyn	
1768	Savile Finch	Whig	The Viscount Downe	
1774	Savile Finch	Whig	Edmund Burke (Note: In 1774 Burke was also elected for Bristol, and did not sit for Malton in this Parliament)	Rockinghamite Whig
1775 by-election	Savile Finch	Whig	William Weddell	Whig
1780 by-election	Edmund Burke	Whig	William Weddell	Whig
April 1784	Edmund Burke	Whig	Sir Thomas Gascoigne	Whig
Aug 1784 by-election	Edmund Burke	Whig	William Weddell	Whig
1792 by-election	Edmund Burke	Whig	Hon. George Damer (Note: Styled Viscount Milton from 1792)	Whig
1794 by-election	Richard Burke (died 1794)	Whig	Hon. George Damer	Whig
1795 by-election	William Baldwin	Whig	Hon. George Damer	Whig
1798 by-election	William Baldwin	Whig	Bryan Cooke	Whig
1798 by-election	Charles Lawrence Dundas	Whig	Bryan Cooke	Whig
1805 by-election	Henry Grattan	Whig	Bryan Cooke	Whig
1806	Viscount Milton	Whig	Bryan Cooke	Whig
1807	Hon. Charles Winn-Allanson (Note: Dundas and Winn-Allanson won in a contested election in which Bryan Cooke came third. On petition, Winn-Allanson's election was declared void and a by-election held at which Cooke was elected.)	Tory	Robert Lawrence Dundas	Whig
Mar 1808 by-election	Bryan Cooke	Whig	Robert Lawrence Dundas	Whig
1812	John Ramsden	Whig	Viscount Duncannon	Whig
1826	John Ramsden	Whig	Viscount Normanby	Canningite Tory
1830	John Ramsden	Whig	Sir James Scarlett	Whig (Note: Scarlett took the Chiltern Hundreds in April 1831, after switching from the Whigs to the Tories)
April 1831 by-election	John Ramsden	Whig	Francis Jeffrey (Note: Jeffrey was also elected for Perth District of Burghs at the 1831 general election and chose to represent that constituency)	Whig
May 1831	Henry Gally Knight	Whig	Francis Jeffrey	Whig
Jul 1831 by-election	Henry Gally Knight	Whig	William Cavendish	Whig
Sep. 1831 by-election	Henry Gally Knight	Whig	Charles Pepys	Whig
1832	William Fitzwilliam (Note: Fitzwilliam became Viscount Milton in 1833 when his father succeeded as Earl Fitzwilliam, and resigned to contest his father's Northamptonshire, Northern seat))	Whig	Charles Pepys	Whig
1833 by-election	John Ramsden	Whig	Charles Pepys	Whig
1836 by-election	John Ramsden	Whig	John Walbanke-Childers	Whig
1837 by-election	Viscount Milton (Note: Not the same Viscount Milton who held the seat in 1806-7 or in 1833)	Whig	John Walbanke-Childers	Whig
1841	Evelyn Denison	Whig	John Walbanke-Childers	Whig
1846 by-election	Evelyn Denison	Whig	Viscount Milton	Whig
1847	Evelyn Denison	Whig	John Walbanke-Childers	Whig
1852	Evelyn Denison	Whig	Hon. Charles Wentworth-Fitzwilliam	Whig
1857	James Brown	Whig	Hon. Charles Wentworth-Fitzwilliam	Whig
1859	James Brown	Liberal	Hon. Charles Wentworth-Fitzwilliam	Liberal
1868	Representation reduced to one member			

=== MPs 1868–1885 ===
Year	Member	Party
1868	Hon. Charles Wentworth-FitzWilliam	Liberal
1885	constituency abolished	

== Election results ==
=== Elections in the 1830s ===
General election 1830: Malton
Party	Candidate	Votes	%	±%
Whig	John Charles Ramsden	Unopposed		
Whig	James Scarlett	Unopposed		
Registered electors		c. 500		
Whig hold				
Whig hold				

Scarlett resigned, causing a by-election.

By-election, 6 April 1831: Malton
Party	Candidate	Votes	%	±%
Whig	Francis Jeffrey	Unopposed		
Registered electors		c. 500		
Whig hold				

General election 1831: Malton
Party	Candidate	Votes	%	±%
Whig	Francis Jeffrey	Unopposed		
Whig	Henry Gally Knight	Unopposed		
Registered electors		c. 500		
Whig hold				
Whig hold				

Jeffrey was also elected for Perth Burghs and opted to sit there, causing a by-election.

By-election, 13 July 1831: Malton
Party	Candidate	Votes	%	±%
Whig	William Cavendish	Unopposed		
Registered electors		c. 500		
Whig hold				

Cavendish resigned, causing a by-election.

By-election, 30 September 1831: Malton
Party	Candidate	Votes	%	±%
Whig	Charles Pepys	Unopposed		
Registered electors		c. 500		
Whig hold				

General election 1832: Malton
Party	Candidate	Votes	%	±%
Whig	William Charles Wentworth-FitzWilliam	Unopposed		
Whig	Charles Pepys	Unopposed		
Registered electors		667		
Whig hold				
Whig hold				

Wentworth-FitzWilliam resigned in order to contest a by-election at North Northamptonshire, causing a by-election.

By-election, 8 March 1833: Malton
Party	Candidate	Votes	%	±%
Whig	John Charles Ramsden	Unopposed		
Whig hold				

Pepys was appointed as Solicitor General for England and Wales, requiring a by-election.

By-election, 4 March 1834: Malton
Party	Candidate	Votes	%	±%
Whig	Charles Pepys	Unopposed		
Whig hold				

General election 1835: Malton
Party	Candidate	Votes	%	±%
Whig	John Charles Ramsden	Unopposed		
Whig	Charles Pepys	Unopposed		
Registered electors		616		
Whig hold				
Whig hold				

Pepys was appointed as First Lord Commissioner for the Custody of the Great Seal, requiring a by-election.

By-election, 19 May 1835: Malton
Party	Candidate	Votes	%	±%
Whig	Charles Pepys	Unopposed		
Whig hold				

Pepys resigned after being appointed as Lord Chancellor and being elevated to the peerage, becoming 1st Earl of Cottenham, requiring a by-election.

By-election, 12 February 1836: Malton
Party	Candidate	Votes	%	±%
Whig	John Walbanke-Childers	Unopposed		
Whig hold				

Ramsden's death caused a by-election.

By-election, 27 January 1837: Malton
Party	Candidate	Votes	%	±%
Whig	William Wentworth-Fitzwilliam	Unopposed		
Whig hold				

General election 1837: Malton
Party	Candidate	Votes	%	±%
Whig	John Walbanke-Childers	Unopposed		
Whig	William Wentworth-Fitzwilliam	Unopposed		
Registered electors		603		
Whig hold				
Whig hold				

=== Elections in the 1840s ===
General election 1841: Malton
Party	Candidate	Votes	%	±%
Whig	John Walbanke-Childers	Unopposed		
Whig	Evelyn Denison	Unopposed		
Registered electors		572		
Whig hold				
Whig hold				

Childers resigned by accepting the office of Steward of the Chiltern Hundreds, causing a by-election.

By-election, 15 April 1846: Malton
Party	Candidate	Votes	%	±%
Whig	William Wentworth-Fitzwilliam	Unopposed		
Whig hold				

General election 1847: Malton
Party	Candidate	Votes	%	±%
Whig	John Walbanke-Childers	Unopposed		
Whig	Evelyn Denison	Unopposed		
Registered electors		535		
Whig hold				
Whig hold				

=== Elections in the 1850s ===
General election 1852: Malton
Party	Candidate	Votes	%	±%
Whig	Charles Wentworth-FitzWilliam	Unopposed		
Whig	Evelyn Denison	Unopposed		
Registered electors		539		
Whig hold				
Whig hold				

General election 1857: Malton
Party	Candidate	Votes	%	±%
Whig	Charles Wentworth-FitzWilliam	Unopposed		
Whig	James Brown	Unopposed		
Registered electors		594		
Whig hold				
Whig hold				

General election 1859: Malton
Party	Candidate	Votes	%	±%
Liberal	Charles Wentworth-FitzWilliam	Unopposed		
Liberal	James Brown	Unopposed		
Registered electors		595		
Liberal hold				
Liberal hold				

=== Elections in the 1860s ===
General election 1865: Malton
Party	Candidate	Votes	%	±%
Liberal	Charles Wentworth-FitzWilliam	Unopposed		
Liberal	James Brown	Unopposed		
Registered electors		600		
Liberal hold				
Liberal hold				

Seat reduced to one member

General election 1868: Malton
Party	Candidate	Votes	%	±%
Liberal	Charles Wentworth-FitzWilliam	Unopposed		
Registered electors		1,218		
Liberal hold				

=== Elections in the 1870s ===
General election 1874: Malton
Party	Candidate	Votes	%	±%
Liberal	Charles Wentworth-FitzWilliam	603	56.0	N/A
Conservative	Robert Hartley Bower	474	44.0	New
Majority		129	12.0	N/A
Turnout		1,077	86.9	N/A
Registered electors		1,240		
Liberal hold		Swing	N/A	

=== Elections in the 1880s ===
General election 1880: Malton
Party	Candidate	Votes	%	±%
Liberal	Charles Wentworth-FitzWilliam	809	64.5	+8.5
Conservative	William Worsley	445	35.5	−8.5
Majority		364	29.0	+17.0
Turnout		1,254	90.9	+4.0
Registered electors		1,379		
Liberal hold		Swing	+8.5	

== Notes ==
Footnotes

Citations
