= Giovanni Battista Guelphi =

Italian sculptor

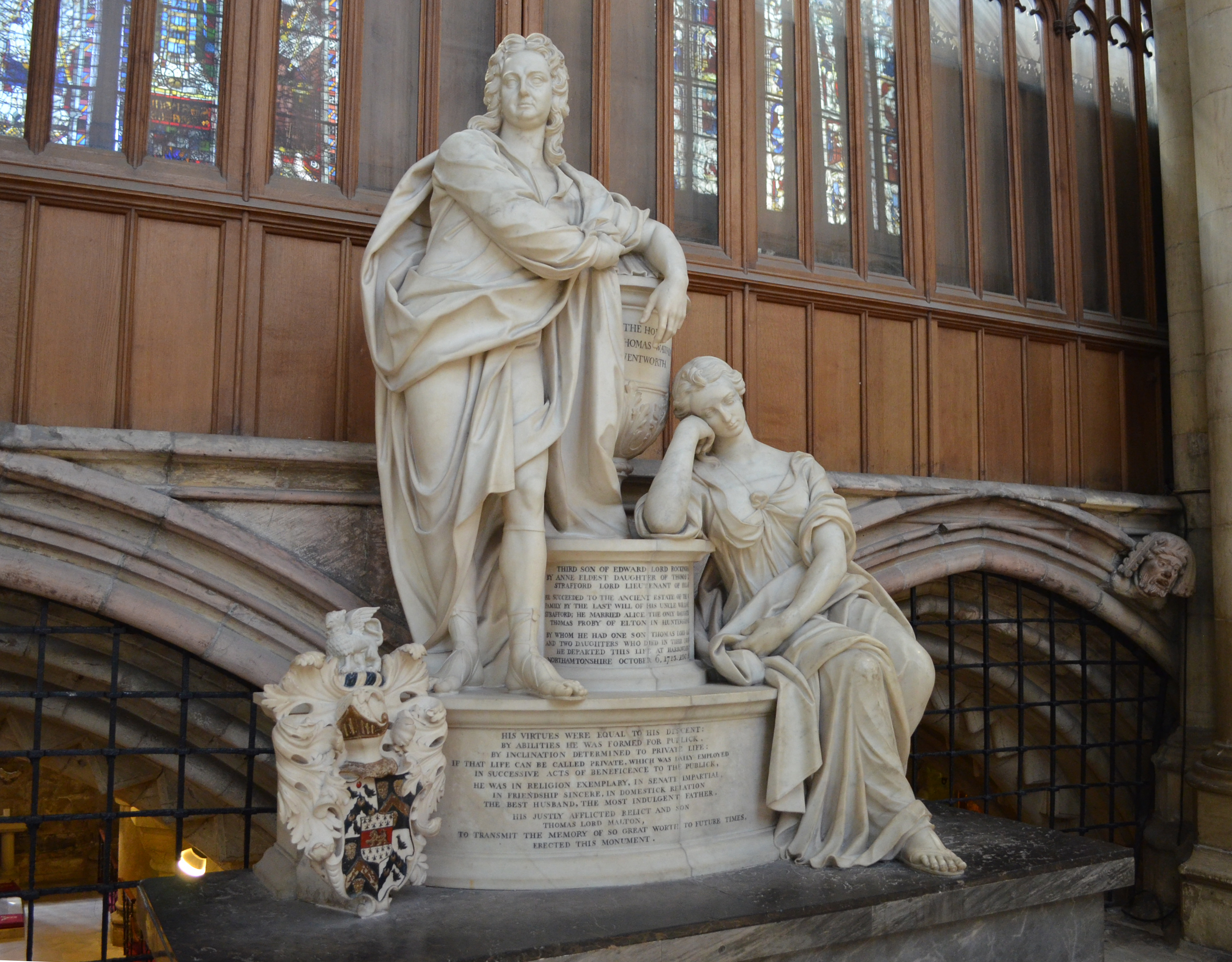
Memorial to Thomas Watson Wentworth in York Minster

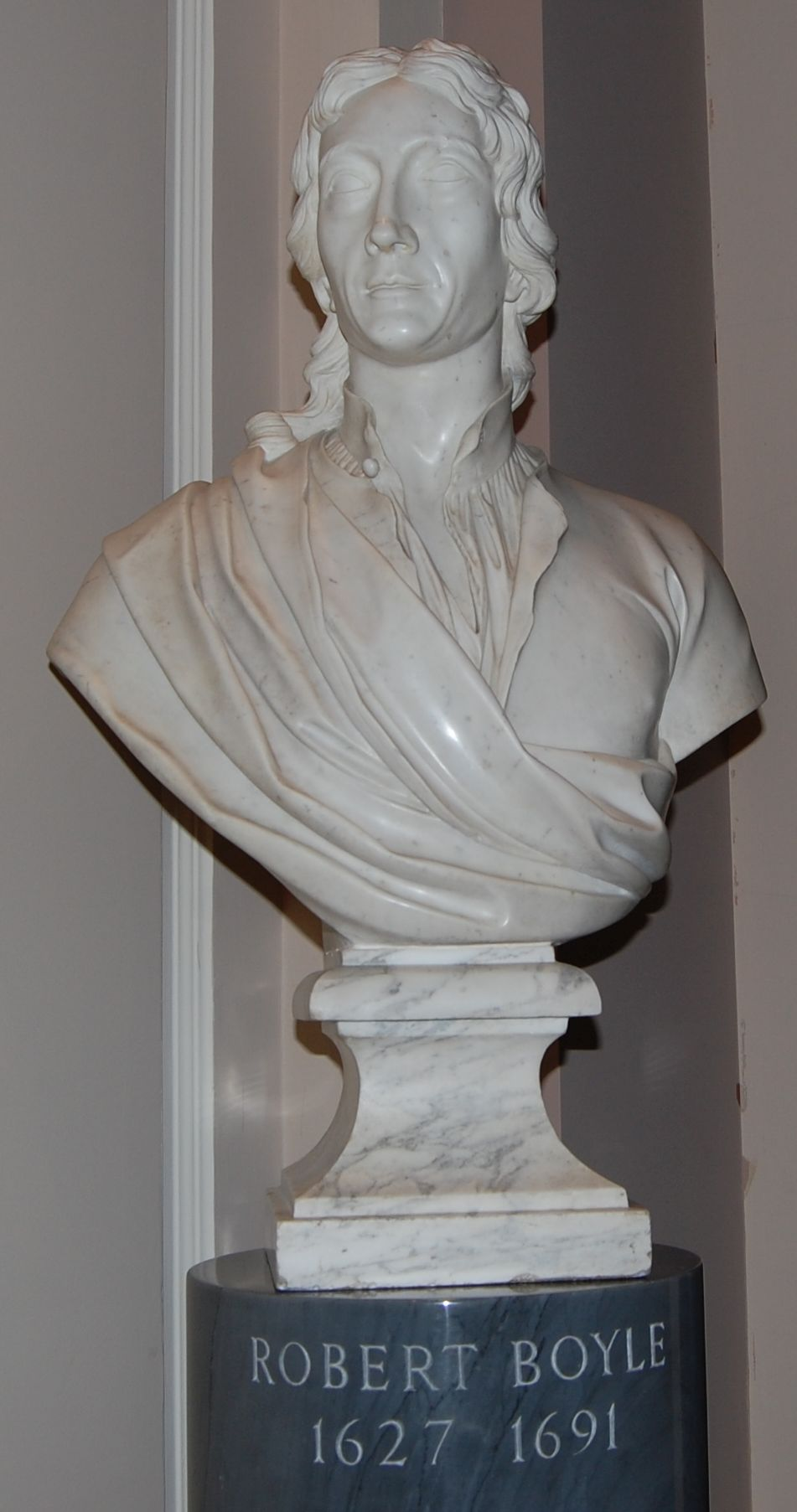
Bust of Robert Boyle by Giovanni Battista Guelfi; Royal Society of Chemistry

Giovanni Battista Guelphi or Guelfi (1690–1736) was an Italian sculptor who worked in England in the early 18th century.

== Life ==
He was born in Italy in the late 17th century.

He trained under sculptor Camillo Rusconi in Rome and in 1714 was invited by Richard Boyle, 3rd Earl of Burlington to move to England, where he restored the Arundel marbles and executed several portrait busts and monuments.

He left England in 1734 and sailed home to Italy where he settled in Bologna, dying there in 1736.

== List of works ==
- Bust of Robert Boyle, now at the Royal Society of Chemistry; commissioned in 1731 by Richard Boyle, 3rd Earl of Burlington for Burlington House, later displayed at Chiswick House. Virtually identical to that commissioned by Queen Caroline for her grotto at Richmond in 1732–3, now in the Royal Collection at Kensington Palace.
- Busts of Isaac Newton, John Locke, Dr Clark and Mr Woolaston at Queen Caroline's Hermitage at Richmond (1729)
- Bust of Nicholas (?) "Bacon" at Queen Caroline's Hermitage at Richmond (1731)
- Bust of Anne Lennox, Duchess of Richmond (1671-1722), part of her 1734 monument in the Brudenell family vault St Peter's Church, Deene, Northamptonshire. (wooden model for this is in the Victoria and Albert Museum)
- Monument to James Craggs the Younger (d.1721) in Westminster Abbey (1727)
- Bust of Isaac Newton commissioned by Alexander Pope later passed in a will to Lord Mansfield.
- Monument on the grave of the Earl of Warwick in St Mary Abbots in Kensington (1730)
- Monument to the maternal grandparents (Stringers) of the Earl of Westmorland in Kirkthorpe church
- Monument to Richard Beaumont, first husband of Lady Westmorland, at Kirkheaton Church
- Memorial to Thomas Watson Wentworth in York Minster
