= Edmund Downing =

Edmund Downing (c. 1530 - 1596?), of White Friars, London and Hendon, Middlesex, was an English Member of Parliament (MP).

He was a Member of the Parliament of England for Higham Ferrers in 1572.

Parliament of England
Preceded by Christopher Hatton	Member of Parliament for Higham Ferrers; 1572	Succeeded by Humphrey Mildmay
