= Henry Finch (died 1761) =

British academic and politician

Henry Finch (c. 1694–1761) was a British academic and politician who sat in the House of Commons from 1724 to 1761.

Finch was the fourth surviving son of Daniel Finch, 2nd Earl of Nottingham and 7th Earl of Winchilsea and his second wife Anne Hatton, daughter of Christopher Hatton, 1st Viscount Hatton, He was educated at Eton College in 1707 and was admitted at Christ's College, Cambridge on 19 August. 1712, aged 17. He was nominated by his father as a fellow of Christ's on the Finch and Baines foundation in 1713 and was awarded MA in 1714.

Finch stood unsuccessfully for Parliament as a Whig in the Cambridge University by-election on 19 December 1720. By 1724 he had been over ten years at Cambridge and his father and his brother Lord Finch were in discussion over his future. He was returned as Member of Parliament for Malton at a by-election on 27 November 1724 on the interest of his brother-in-law, Thomas Watson Wentworth. In 1726 he lost his college fellowship because of non-residence and for holding more property as an MP than was permissible for a fellow, but he was reinstated soon afterwards and retained the fellowship until 1749. He was returned unopposed at Malton at the 1727 and was appointed receiver-general of the revenues of Minorca in 1729. He lived at Minorca for a time. He was returned unopposed in the 1734 and 1741 general elections. When in Parliament, he voted with the Government in every recorded division. In 1743 he left the Minorca post and was appointed surveyor of works on the recommendation of Pelham in preference to his brother Edward. He was returned for Malton again at the 1747 general election and was classed as Old Whig. He was returned unopposed at the 1754 general election. In December 1760 his place of surveyor general of works was required for someone else and he. was given a secret service pension of £900 p.a. He was returned as MP for Malton for the last time in 1761.

Finch died unmarried on 26 April 1761. One of his four illegitimate children, Charlotte (died 5 April 1810), married Thomas Raikes, Governor of the Bank of England. As well as Lord Finch, his brothers Edward, John and William Finch were also Members of Parliament

Parliament of Great Britain
Preceded by Sir William Strickland; Thomas Watson-Wentworth	Member of Parliament for Malton; 1724–1761; With: Thomas Watson-Wentworth; Wardell Westby; William Wentworth; Lord James Cavendish; John Mostyn	Succeeded by Savile Finch; John Mostyn
