= James Brown (MP for Malton) =

British Liberal Party politician

James Brown (12 April 1814 – 14 July 1877) was a British Liberal Party politician. He sat in the House of Commons from 1857 to 1868.

At the 1847 general election, Brown stood unsuccessfully in Kingston upon Hull, where the three Liberal candidates for the City's two seats were unopposed by any Conservatives.

Brown did not stand for Parliament again until the 1847 general election, when he was elected unopposed as one of the two Members of Parliament for Malton. The lack of opposition was not unusual in Malton: the borough was controlled by the Earl Fitzwilliam, and after 1808 there no contested elections in Malton until 1874, by when the secret ballot had been introduced by the Ballot Act 1872.

He was re-elected in 1859 and in 1865, holding the seat until the borough's representation was reduced to one seat at the 1868 general election.

Parliament of the United Kingdom
Preceded by Evelyn Denison; Charles Wentworth-FitzWilliam	Member of Parliament for Malton; 1857 – 1868; With: Charles Wentworth-FitzWilliam	Succeeded by Charles Wentworth-FitzWilliam
