= Thomas Watson-Wentworth, 1st Marquess of Rockingham =

British Whig politician

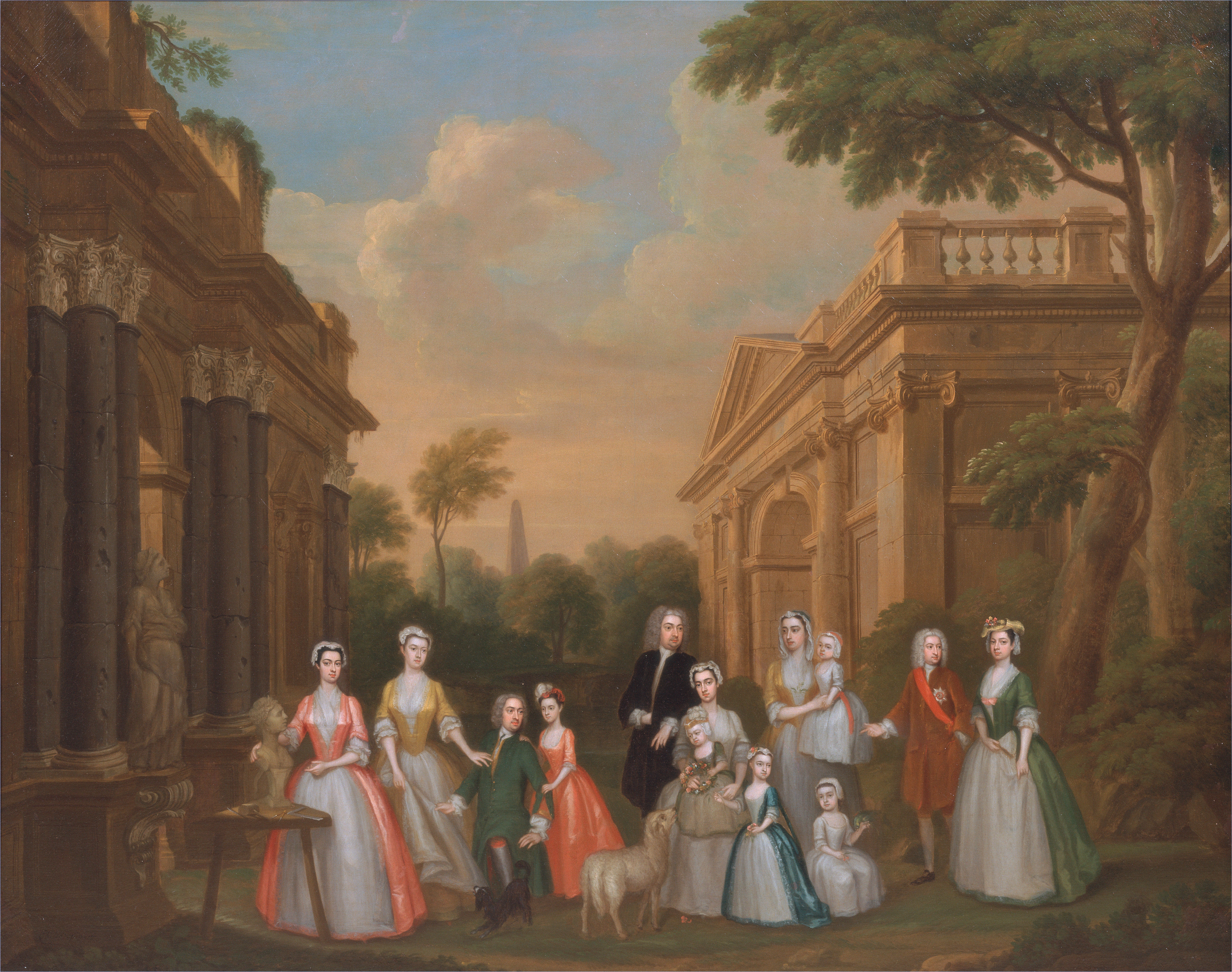
The Watson-Wentworth and Finch families (Charles Philips, c. 1732)

Thomas Watson-Wentworth, 1st Marquess of Rockingham, KB, PC (I) (13 November 1693 – 14 December 1750) of Wentworth Woodhouse, Yorkshire was an English Whig politician who sat in the House of Commons from 1715 until 1728 when he was raised to the Peerage as Baron Malton.

== Early life ==
Watson-Wentworth was born at Tidmington, Worcestershire the only son and heir of Thomas Watson (later Watson-Wentworth, the third son of Edward Watson, 2nd Baron Rockingham) and his wife, Alice Proby, a daughter of Sir Thomas Proby, 1st Baronet. He was admitted at St John's College, Cambridge on 15 May 1707 and was awarded MA in 1708. In 1708, he bought Hallfield House, near Sheffield. On 22 September 1716, he married Lady Mary Finch (1701-1761), a daughter of Daniel Finch, 2nd Earl of Nottingham and 7th Earl of Winchilsea, and his second wife, the Hon. Anne Hatton. He succeeded his father to Wentworth Woodhouse in 1723, remodelling the house to its present form.

== Career ==
At the 1715 general election, Watson-Wentworth was elected in a contest as Member of Parliament for the family borough of Malton. He was returned again unopposed at the 1722 general election. On the death of his father in 1723 he set himself up as leader of the Whigs in Yorkshire. In 1725, he was appointed a Knight of the Bath. At the 1727 general election he was returned unopposed as MP for Yorkshire instead. In 1728, he was created Baron Malton and vacated his seat in the House of Commons.

At this time, now Lord Malton, he deliberately burned most of the manuscripts left by the 17th-century antiquary Richard Gascoigne; this act has been attributed to legal advice from his attorney. He was admitted to the Privy Council of Ireland in 1733 and was Lord Lieutenant of the West Riding of Yorkshire from 1733 to 1750. In 1734, he was created Earl of Malton, and in 1746, Marquess of Rockingham. He had inherited the Barony of Rockingham and Rockingham Castle from his cousin, Thomas Watson, 3rd Earl of Rockingham, earlier in 1746.

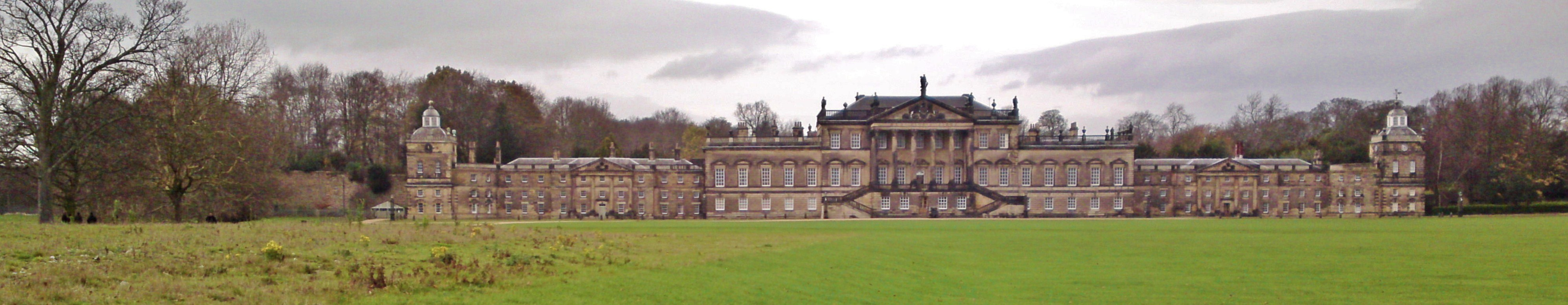
Wentworth Woodhouse, Yorkshire. It has the longest country house facade in Europe

== Family ==
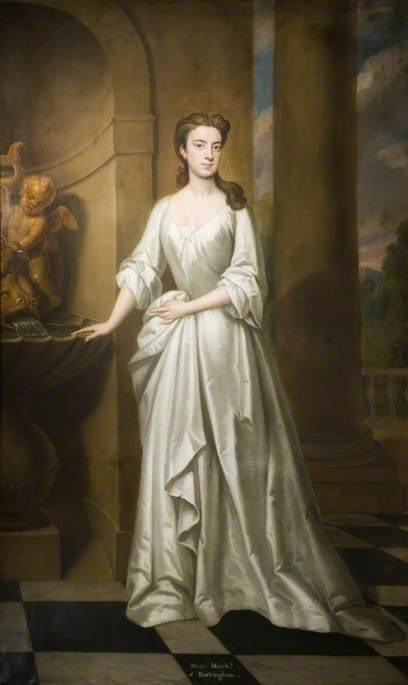
Lady Mary Finch, Marchioness of Rockingham by Godfrey Kneller (1646–1723)

He and his wife Lady Mary Finch (1701–1761) had nine children:

1. William (1718-1718)
2. Thomas (1720-1734)
3. Daniel (1724-1730)
4. William, styled Viscount Higham (1728–1739), died young
5. Charles, 2nd Marquess of Rockingham (1730–1782), Prime Minister of Great Britain.
6. Lady Anne (d. 1769), married William Fitzwilliam, 3rd Earl Fitzwilliam.
7. Lady Mary (1725-1725)
8. Lady Mary (1727–1798), married John Milbanke.
9. Lady Charlotte Wentworth (1732–1810), died unmarried.
10. Lady Henrietta Alicia (b.1737), eloped and married her footman William Sturgeon in 1764.

Lord Rockingham died on 14 December 1750, according to Walpole 'drowned in claret', and was buried in York Minster.

== Arms ==
Coat of arms of Thomas Watson-Wentworth, 1st Marquess of Rockingham
Coronet A Coronet of a Marquess Crest A griffin passant, wings elevated argent, beaked, forlegged and ducally gorged or. Escutcheon Quarterly : Quarterly : 1st and 4th Argent, on a chevron engrailed azure between three martlets sable, as many crescents or, (Watson); 2nd and 3rd Sable, a chevron between three leopards' heads or (Wentworth). Supporters Dexter: A griffin argent, beaked and forlegged gules, collared vairé ermine and azure; Sinister: A lion or, collared vairé and ermine. Motto Mea gloria fides (Trust is my renown). Orders The Order of the Bath - Knight Companion (KB)

Parliament of Great Britain
Preceded by William Palmes; Thomas Watson-Wentworth	Member of Parliament for Malton; 1715–1727; With: Thomas Watson-Wentworth 1715–22; Sir William Strickland, Bt. 1722–24; Henry Finch 1724–27	Succeeded by Henry Finch; Wardell Westby
Preceded by The Viscount Downe; Cholmley Turner	Member of Parliament for Yorkshire; 1727–1728; With: Cholmley Turner	Succeeded by Cholmley Turner; Sir George Savile, Bt
Honorary titles
Preceded by The Earl of Burlington	Lord Lieutenant of the West Riding of Yorkshire; 1733–1750	Succeeded by The Marquess of Rockingham
Preceded by The Earl of Burlington	Custos Rotulorum of the North Riding of Yorkshire; 1733–1750	Succeeded by The Marquess of Rockingham
Peerage of Great Britain
New creation	Marquess of Rockingham; 1746–1750	Succeeded by Charles Watson-Wentworth
New creation	Earl of Malton; 1734–1750	Succeeded by Charles Watson-Wentworth
New creation	Baron Malton; 1728–1750	Succeeded by Charles Watson-Wentworth
Peerage of England
Preceded by Thomas Watson	Baron Rockingham; 1746–1750	Succeeded by Charles Watson-Wentworth
