= Thomas Watson-Wentworth =

English landowner and politician

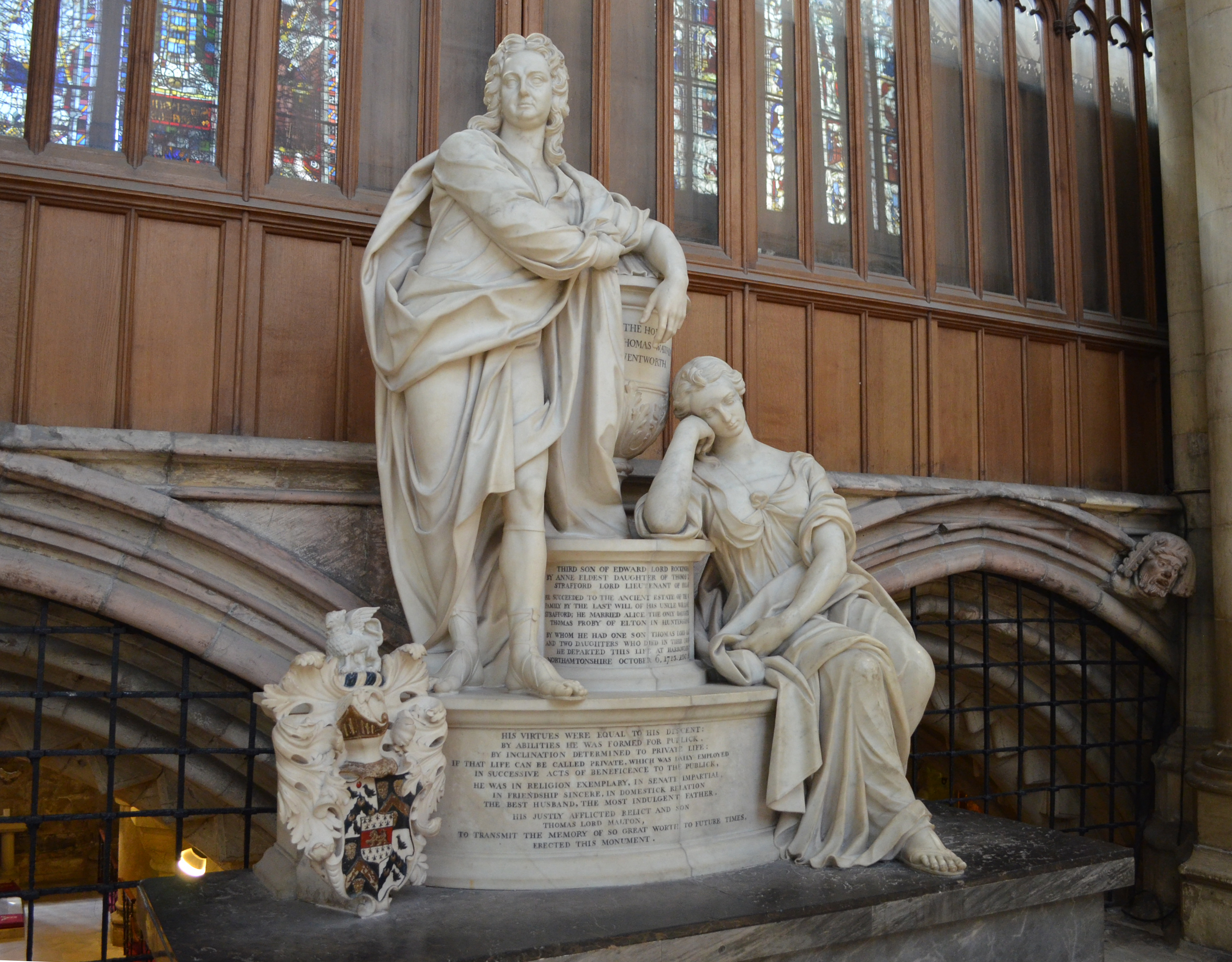
Memorial to Thomas Watson-Wentworth in the north choir aisle of York Minster; designed by William Kent, executed by Giovanni Battista Guelphi of Rome

Hon. Thomas Watson, later known as Thomas Watson-Wentworth (17 June 1665 – 6 October 1723), of Wentworth Woodhouse in Yorkshire, was an English landowner and politician who sat in the House of Commons between 1701 and 1723.

== Origins ==
He was the third son of Edward Watson, 2nd Baron Rockingham (1630-1689) by his wife Anne Wentworth, only daughter of Thomas Wentworth, 1st Earl of Strafford (1593-1641) and heiress of her childless brother William Wentworth, 2nd Earl of Strafford (1626-1695) of Wentworth Woodhouse. His eldest brother was Lewis Watson, 1st Earl of Rockingham, 3rd Baron Rockingham (1655-1724), who in 1714 was created Earl of Rockingham.

== Early life ==
He matriculated at Christ Church, Oxford in 1683.

== Marriage and children ==
By licence dated 18 July 1689 he married Alice Proby, a daughter and heiress of Sir Thomas Proby, 1st Baronet, by whom he had children including:

- Thomas Watson-Wentworth, 1st Marquess of Rockingham (13 November 1693 – 14 December 1750), KB, Privy Council of Ireland, a Whig politician who in 1725 rebuilt Wentworth Woodhouse as the palatial building surviving today.

== Wentworth inheritance ==
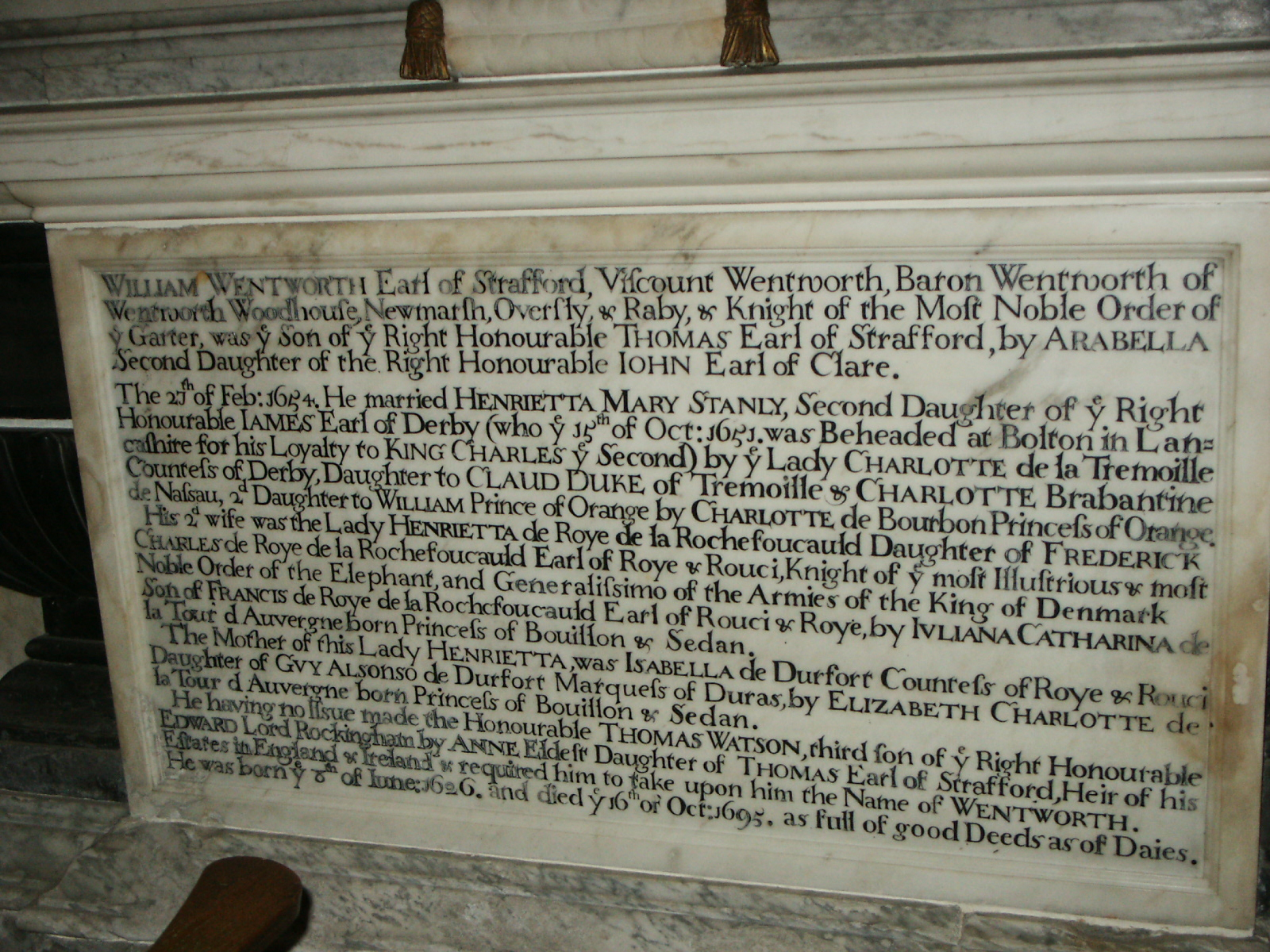
Inscription on monument of William Wentworth, 2nd Earl of Strafford in York Minster recording his heir as Thomas Watson, with an obligation to adopt the surname "Wentworth"

In 1695 Watson inherited the fortune of his maternal uncle William Wentworth, 2nd Earl of Strafford, including the vast estate of Wentworth Woodhouse in Yorkshire, with others in Northamptonshire and Ireland. This was in preference to the Earl's first cousin once-removed Thomas Wentworth (later created Earl of Strafford), who shared with him common ancestry in the male line, and it led to a fierce rivalry between the two men and their families. In accordance with the terms of the bequest, Watson adopted the additional surname of Wentworth, becoming Thomas Watson-Wentworth.

== Career ==
Watson-Wentworth was returned unopposed as Whig Member of Parliament for Bossiney at a by-election on 21 March 1701. He was only returned as a stop-gap and at the general election later that year he sought a seat elsewhere but in the end decided not to stand. At the 1702 general election, he stood at Higham Ferrers but was defeated. However his opponent died within a year and Watson-Wentworth was returned unopposed for Higham Ferrers at a by-election on 22 November 1703. He acquired the electoral interest at Higham Ferrers and was returned unopposed at the general elections of 1705, 1708 and 1710. He made little impression in his first parliaments, but being a church supporter moved progressively towards the Tories culminating in opposing the impeachment of Henry Sacheverell and being considered a worthy patriot. At the 1713 general election he was returned at Malton as well as Higham Ferrers and decided to sit for Malton. Now being considered whimsical or a Whig that voted with the Tories he supported the Whigs against the expulsion of Richard Steele and in other divisions. After the 1715 general election, when he and his son were elected in a contest at Malton, he was classified as a Whig, but voted against the government on almost every occasion. At the 1722 general election he was returned unopposed again for Higham Ferrers.

== Death and burial ==
Watson-Wentworth died at Harrowden on 6 October 1723 and was buried in York Minster where his elaborate monument with standing marble effigy survives. It was sculpted by Giovanni Battista Guelphi.

Parliament of England
Preceded by Francis Robartes; John Tregagle	Member of Parliament for Bossiney; 1701; With: John Tregagle	Succeeded by Sir John Molesworth; John Manley
Preceded by Thomas Pemberton	Member of Parliament for Higham Ferrers; 1703–1708	Succeeded by Parliament of Great Britain
Parliament of Great Britain
Preceded by Parliament of England	Member of Parliament for Higham Ferrers; 1708–1713	Succeeded by Charles Leigh
Preceded by William Palmes; William Strickland	Member of Parliament for Malton; 1713–1722; With: William Strickland; Thomas Watson-Wentworth (the younger) 1715	Succeeded by Sir William Strickland; Thomas Watson-Wentworth (the younger)
Preceded by Charles Leigh	Member of Parliament for Higham Ferrers; 1722–1723	Succeeded by John Finch
