= Boynton, East Riding of Yorkshire =

Village and civil parish in the East Riding of Yorkshire, England

Coordinates: 54.097201°N 0.264282°W

Boynton
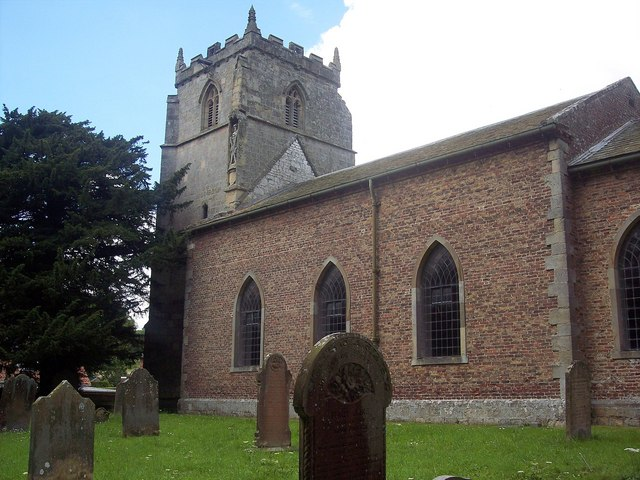
- St Andrew's Church, Boynton

- Location within the East Riding of Yorkshire
- Population: 161 (2001 census)
- OS grid reference: TA136682
  - London: 180 mi (290 km) S
- Civil parish: Boynton
- Unitary authority: East Riding of Yorkshire
- Ceremonial county: East Riding of Yorkshire
- Region: Yorkshire and the Humber
- Country: England
- Sovereign state: United Kingdom
- Post town: BRIDLINGTON
- Postcode district: YO16
- Dialling code: 01262
- Police: Humberside
- Fire: Humberside
- Ambulance: Yorkshire
- UK Parliament: Bridlington and The Wolds

Boynton is a village and civil parish in the East Riding of Yorkshire, England. It is approximately 3 miles (5 km) west of the town of Bridlington and lies on the B1253 road.

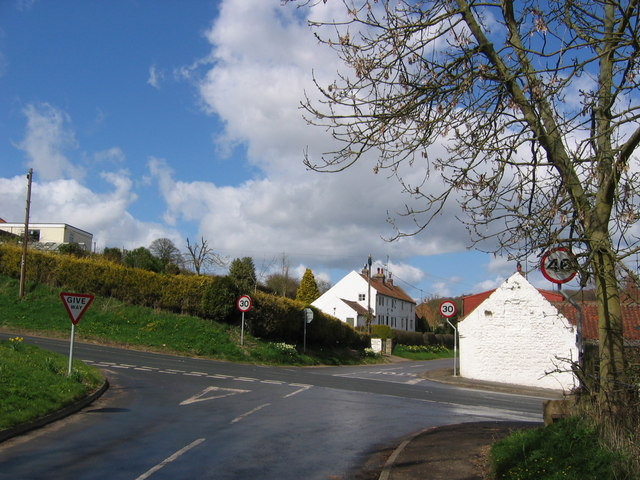
Boynton

According to the 2001 UK census, the parish had a population of 161. However the 2011 census grouped the parish with Grindale (2001 pop. 98), giving a total of 229. The parish church of St Andrew is a Grade I listed building. It includes a 15th-century tower, as well as memorials to the Strickland, later Cholmley, later Strickland-Constable Baronets, of Boynton (1641), whose seat was Boynton Hall, which is also Grade I listed.

The name Boynton derives from the Old English Bofaingtūn meaning 'settlement connected with Bofa'.

From the mediaeval era until the 19th century Boynton was part of Dickering Wapentake. Between 1894 and 1974 Boynton was a part of the Bridlington Rural District, in the East Riding of Yorkshire. Between 1974 and 1996 it was part of the Borough of North Wolds (later Borough of East Yorkshire), in the county of Humberside.

== St Andrew's Church ==
St Andrew's Church is remarkable for its profusion of turkeys - in the lectern, the windows, and the roof bosses. This is a tribute to William Strickland (d. 1598) who is said to have brought turkeys to Britain.

== See also ==
- Listed buildings in Boynton, East Riding of Yorkshire
