= Thomas Hebblethwaite =

English politician

Thomas Hebblethwaite (1629 – June 1668) was an English politician who sat in the House of Commons between 1660 and 1668.

Hebblethwaite was the only son of James Hebblethwaite of Norton and his first wife Anne Hungate, daughter of Thomas Hungate of North Dalton. He was baptised on 19 June 1628. He was educated at Coxwold Grammar School and was a student of St John's College, Cambridge in 1646 and of Middle Temple in 1647. He lived at Norton.

In 1660, Hebblethwaite was elected Member of Parliament for Malton in the Convention Parliament. He was knighted at Whitehall on 9 June 1660. In 1661, he was re-elected MP for Malton for the Cavalier Parliament and sat until his death in 1668.

Hebblethwaite died at the age of 40 and was buried on 21 June 1668.

Hebblethwaite married Barbara Marwood. His son James succeeded him as MP for Malton.
