= Sir Christopher Wyvill, 3rd Baronet =

English politician

Sir Christopher Wyvill, 3rd Baronet (1614 – 8 February 1681) was an English politician who sat in the House of Commons in 1659 and 1660.

Wyvill was the son of Sir Marmaduke Wyvill, 2nd Baronet of Constable Burton Hall and his wife Isabel Gascoigne, daughter of Sir William Gascoigne of Sedbury Yorkshire. He was baptised on 6 December 1614. Wyvill is credited with a rare little octavo in the Bodleian Library entitled Certaine serious Thoughts which at several times & upon sundry occasions have stollen themselves into verse and now into the publike view from the author [monogram, ‘C. W.’], Esquire. Together with a chronological table denoting the names of such Princes as ruled the neighbour states & were contemporary with our English Kings published in London in 1647. This volume of verse is described at some length in Brydges's Censura Literaria (1808, vii. 261–4), and there dubiously attributed to C. Warwick. The Wyvill arms on the title-page point almost conclusively to (Sir) Christopher's authorship, which is conjecturally adopted in the British Museum Catalogue. Wyvill inherited the baronetcy on the death of his father in 1648.

In 1659, Wyvill was elected Member of Parliament for Richmond in the Third Protectorate Parliament.

In 1660, Wyvill was elected MP for Richmond in the Convention Parliament. He was the author of an anti-papal duodecimo entitled The Pretensions of the Triple Crown published in London in 1672.

Wyvill died at the age of 66.

Wyvill married Ursula Darcy, daughter of Conyers, Lord Darcy. His son William succeeded him in the baronetcy.

Parliament of England
Preceded by John Bathurst	Member of Parliament for Richmond; 1659; With: John Bathurst	Succeeded by Thomas Chaloner; Francis Thorpe
Preceded by Thomas Chaloner; Francis Thorpe	Member of Parliament for Richmond; 1660; With: James Darcy	Succeeded by Sir John Yorke; Joseph Cradock
Baronetage of England
Preceded by Marmaduke Wyvill	Baronet (of Constable Burton) c.1648–1681	Succeeded by William Wyvill
