= John Pepper (English MP) =

16th-century English politician

John Pepper (c. 1537 – 14 June 1603), of St Martins, Richmond, Yorkshire, was an English politician.

He was the son and heir of William Pepper of St. Martins and his wife Margaret. His father had acquired the site and manor of the former priory of St Martin's in 1551. He married Anne, daughter of Michael Hall of Leventhorpe in Swillington, Yorkshire.

As a burgess of Richmond, he served as Member (MP) of the Parliament of England for Richmond, Yorkshire in 1584 and 1593. He was alderman (mayor) of Richmond in 1586–7 and 1594–5.

He was succeeded by his son Christopher, who also served Richmond as MP.

Parliament of England
Preceded by ? ?	Member of Parliament for Richmond, Yorkshire; 1584; With: Marmaduke Wyvill	Succeeded by Robert Bowes; Samuel Coxe
Parliament of England
Preceded by James Dale; John Smythe	Member of Parliament for Richmond, Yorkshire; 1593; With: Talbot Bowes	Succeeded by Marmaduke Wyvill; Cuthbert Pepper
