= Richmond by-election =

Richmond by-election may refer to:

== Australia ==
- 1957 Richmond by-election
- 1984 Richmond by-election

== United Kingdom ==
=== London ===
- 2016 Richmond Park by-election

=== Yorkshire ===
- 1872 Richmond (Yorks) by-election
- 1873 Richmond (Yorks) by-election
- 1989 Richmond (Yorks) by-election
