= John Smythe (MP for Richmond) =

16th-century English politician

John Smythe (died 1599/1600), of King's Lynn, Norfolk, was an English politician.

He was a Member (MP) of the Parliament of England for Richmond, Yorkshire in 1589.

Parliament of England
Preceded by Robert Bowes; Samuel Coxe	Member of Parliament for Richmond, Yorkshire; 1589; With: James Dale	Succeeded by Talbot Bowes; John Pepper
