= James Dale (MP) =

16th-century English politician

James Dale (fl. 1589) was an English politician.

He was a Member of Parliament (United Kingdom) of the Parliament of England for Richmond, North Yorkshire in 1589. No further information on him is known to be recorded.

Parliament of England
Preceded by Robert Bowes; Samuel Coxe	Member of Parliament for Richmond, Yorkshire; 1589; With: John Smythe	Succeeded by Talbot Bowes; John Pepper
