= James Darcy (1617–1673) =

Member of the Parliament of England

James Darcy (1617 - 1673) was an English politician who sat in the House of Commons in 1660.

Darcy was the son of Conyers Darcy, 4th Baron Darcy (died 1654) and his wife Dorothy Belasyse, daughter of Sir Henry Belasyse, 1st Baronet of Newburgh Priory. He was baptised on 30 November 1617. He was a commissioner for militia for Yorkshire in March 1660.

In April 1660, Darcy was elected Member of Parliament for Richmond in the Convention Parliament. He was a J.P. for the North Riding of Yorkshire from July 1660 to 1666 and a commissioner for assessment from August 1660 until his death. In June 1661 he was appointed Master of the Royal Stud at £200 per year and was contracted to supply twelve horses a year for £800. He was receiver of the free gift for Yorkshire from 1661 to 1665, commissioner for corporations from 1662 to 1663 and commissioner for loyal and indigent officers in 1662. In 1668 his salary as Master of the Royal Stud was abolished in the Household reforms, and his contract was reduced to £500 for five horses of his own breeding.

Darcy died between 13 October 1673 when he made his will and 5 February 1674 when it was proved.

Darcy married by 1650, Isabel Wyvill, daughter of Sir Marmaduke Wyvill, 2nd Baronet of Burton Constable and had three sons and four daughters. He was the father of James Darcy, 1st Baron Darcy of Navan and brother of Conyers Darcy, 1st Earl of Holderness, and Hon. Marmaduke Darcy.

Parliament of England
| Preceded by Thomas Chaloner; Francis Thorpe | Member of Parliament for Richmond; 1660; With: Sir Christopher Wyvill, 3rd Baronet | Succeeded by Sir John Yorke; Joseph Cradock |
