= John Wandesford =

John Wandesford may refer to:

- John Wandesford (died 1664) (c. 1632–1664), English Member of Parliament for Kirklington, Yorkshire
- John Wandesford (died 1665) (1593–1665), English Member of Parliament for Kirklington, Yorkshire
- John Wandesford, 1st Earl Wandesford (1725–1784), Anglo-Irish peer
