= Thomas Danby (died 1660) =

English landowner and politician

Sir Thomas Danby (1610 – 5 August 1660) was an English landowner and politician who sat in the House of Commons between 1640 and 1642. He supported the Royalist side in the English Civil War.

== Life ==
Danby was the son of Christopher Danby, and his wife Frances Parker, daughter of Edward Parker, 12th Baron Morley. He owned 10 manors and over 2,000 acres including coal mines. He was High Sheriff of Yorkshire for 1637 and was knighted on 25 July 1633.

Danby was elected Member of Parliament for Richmond, Yorkshire for the Long Parliament in November 1640. He supported the King and was disabled from sitting in parliament in September 1642. He was fined £4,780 for his loyalty.

Danby died in London and was buried in York Minster.

Danby married Katherine Wandesford, elder daughter of Christopher Wandesford, Lord Deputy of Ireland, and Alice Osborne; she died in 1645. They had sixteen children, of whom ten, eight boys and two girls, survived infancy. Their son Thomas Danby (1631–1667) was the first Mayor of Leeds.

Parliament of England
Preceded by Maulger Norton; Sir William Pennyman, 1st Baronet	Member of Parliament for Richmond; 1640–1642; With: Sir William Pennyman, 1st Baronet	Succeeded by Thomas Chaloner; Francis Thorpe
