= Richmond (Yorks) =

Former Parliamentary constituency in the United Kingdom, 1585–2024

- Former county constituency for the House of Commons
- 2010–2024 boundary of Richmond in North Yorkshire

- Location of North Yorkshire within England
- County: 1585–1974 North Riding of Yorkshire; 1974– North Yorkshire
- Electorate: 83,219 (December 2019)
- Major settlements: Bedale, Catterick, Catterick Garrison, Great Ayton, Hawes, Leyburn, Middleham, Northallerton, Richmond, Stokesley

1885–2024
- Seats: One
- Replaced by: Richmond and Northallerton

1585–1885
- Seats: 1585–1868: Two; 1868–1885: One
- Type of constituency: Borough constituency

Richmond (Yorks) was a constituency (Note: A county constituency (for the purposes of election expenses and type of returning officer)) in North Yorkshire in the House of Commons of the UK Parliament. It was represented from 1910 by members of the Conservative Party. The last MP for Richmond was Rishi Sunak from 2015 to 2024, who served as the Prime Minister and Conservative leader from 2022 to 2024. (Note: As with all constituencies, the constituency elects one Member of Parliament (MP) by the first past the post system of election at least every five years.)

Further to the completion of the 2023 review of Westminster constituencies, the seat had minor boundary changes and was renamed to Richmond and Northallerton, first contested at the 2024 general election.

== Constituency profile ==
The constituency was a safe seat for the Conservative Party, which has held it continuously since 1910 (if including the 11 years by the allied Unionist Party from 1918), and in the 2010 general election Richmond produced the largest numerical and percentage majority for a Conservative, 62.8% of the vote.

The Conservative MP and one-time Party leader William Hague held the seat from a by-election in 1989 until he retired from the Commons in 2015. He had held the posts of Leader of the Opposition (1997–2001), Foreign Secretary (2010–2014) and Leader of the House of Commons (2014–2015). His successor, Rishi Sunak, served as Chancellor of the Exchequer from 2020 to 2022 and as Prime Minister from 2022 to 2024, whilst Hague's predecessor, Leon Brittan, served as Home Secretary. The constituency thus produced three consecutive MPs who served in the Great Offices of State, two of whom served as Leader of the Conservative Party.

The constituency consisted of, in the west, the entire Richmondshire district and, in the east, the northern part of Hambleton District. It was a mostly rural seat with a mostly affluent population. (Note: The latest 2011 census statistics include minimal percentages of social housing and welfare recipience.)

== History ==
Richmond was one of the parliamentary boroughs in the Unreformed House of Commons that dates to the middle of its long existence, first being represented in 1585. Medieval royal charters had specifically exempted the town from sending members to Parliament; at the time this was often seen as an expensive burden.

By the early eighteenth century it was controlled by the Yorke and Darcy families, who each nominated a member; the Darcys gained control in the 1760s and shortly afterwards the interest was purchased by Sir Lawrence Dundas, 1st Baronet, along with the Aske estate. The Dundases or their nominees would retain control of the borough's representation for many years; there was no contested election between 1722 and 1839 and then not another until 1866. The last Dundas family member would not retire from the seat until 1885. During this period the seat was a safe one for the Whigs and later the Liberals; since around 1918 it has been a safe seat for the Conservative Party, with majorities often more than 40%.

From 1983 the seat was represented by the cabinet minister Leon Brittan, after boundary changes saw his Cleveland and Whitby seat abolished; however he resigned from the Commons in December 1988 in order to take up the position of vice-president of the European Commission.

=== 1989 by-election ===
The ensuing by-election, in February 1989, was won by William Hague: it was the last by-election won by a Conservative candidate during the Conservative Governments of 1979–1997. Hague's win has been attributed in part to the decision by the remnants of the Social Democratic Party (those members that objected to the merger with the Liberal Party the previous year) to contest the election as well as the newly merged Social and Liberal Democrats (who subsequently renamed themselves the Liberal Democrats). The SDP candidate, local farmer Mike Potter, came second, and Hague's majority of 2,634 was considerably smaller than the number of votes (11,589) for the SLD candidate, Barbara Pearce. Despite the Labour landslide of 1997, they did not come close to winning the seat, which stayed Conservative with a majority of 10,000. Hague retained the seat at every general election from then on, building the Conservative majority to 23,336, until his decision to step down at the 2015 election.

=== 1992 change in main opposition candidate ===
In 1992 the Labour candidate until a few weeks before the election, David Abrahams, was deselected following a series of rows within the local party over his personal life and business interests. It emerged in 2007 that he used the name "David Martin" when dealing with tenants in his various rental properties in the Newcastle area, and that he had claimed that he lived with his wife and son, though he had never been married. Divorcee Anthea Bailey later told a local newspaper she and her 11-year-old son had posed as Mr Abrahams' family as part of a business arrangement so that Abrahams could create "the right impression".

=== 2001–2024 ===
At the 2001 general election Richmond became the Conservatives' safest seat in the UK, both in terms of the actual numerical majority and by percentage, the seat being held by William Hague, then the Conservative leader. Although the numerical majority was surpassed by Buckingham at the 2005 election, Richmond has a smaller electorate and had a greater proportion of Conservative voters so retained the second-largest percentage majority. Again in 2010, Richmond was the safest Conservative seat in the country in terms of numerical and percentage majority, though by 2019 it had slipped out of the top 15 safest Conservative seats. It has been represented since May 2015 by Rishi Sunak, the former Prime Minister of the United Kingdom and leader of the Conservative Party.

== Boundaries ==
Map of 2010–2024 boundaries

1918–1950: The Borough of Richmond, the Urban Districts of Kirklington-cum-Upsland, Masham, and Northallerton, and the Rural Districts of Aysgarth, Bedale, Croft, Leyburn, Northallerton, Reeth, Richmond, Startforth, and Stokesley.

1950–1955: The Borough of Richmond, the Urban District of Northallerton, and the Rural Districts of Aysgarth, Croft, Leyburn, Masham, Northallerton, Reeth, Richmond, Startforth, and Stokesley.

1955–1974: As prior but with redrawn boundaries.

1974–1983: As prior but with redrawn boundaries.

1983–1997: The District of Richmondshire, and the District of Hambleton wards of Appleton Wiske, Bedale, Brompton, Broughton and Greenhow, Carlton Miniott, Crakehall, Great Ayton, Hillside, Leeming, Leeming Bar, Morton-on-Swale, Northallerton North East, Northallerton South East, Northallerton West, Osmotherley, Romanby, Romanby Broomfield, Rudby, Sowerby, Stokesley, Swainby, Tanfield, The Cowtons, The Thorntons, Thirsk, Topcliffe, and Whitestonecliffe.

1997–2010: The District of Richmondshire, and the District of Hambleton wards of Appleton Wiske, Brompton, Broughton and Greenhow, Great Ayton, Leeming Bar, Morton-on-Swale, Northallerton North East, Northallerton South East, Northallerton West, Osmotherley, Romanby, Romanby Broomfield, Rudby, Stokesley, Swainby, and The Cowtons.

2010–2024: The District of Richmondshire, and the former District of Hambleton wards of Bedale, Brompton, Broughton and Greenhow, Cowtons, Crakehall, Great Ayton, Leeming, Leeming Bar, Morton-on-Swale, Northallerton Broomfield, Northallerton Central, Northallerton North, Osmotherley, Romanby, Rudby, Stokesley, Swainby, and Tanfield.

The Richmond constituency covered the Richmondshire district and the northern part of the former Hambleton District. It is a mostly affluent rural area with a significant commuter population, covering parts of the North York Moors and Yorkshire Dales National Parks, including Wensleydale and Swaledale. It contained the market towns of Northallerton, Richmond, Leyburn, Bedale, Hawes and Stokesley, along with Great Ayton and other villages. It also includes the largest army base in Europe, Catterick Garrison.

== Members of Parliament ==
=== MPs 1585–1640 ===
Parliament	First member	Second member
1584	John Pepper	Marmaduke Wyvill
1586	Robert Bowes	Samuel Coxe
1588	James Dale	John Smythe
1593	Talbot Bowes	John Pepper
1597	Marmaduke Wyvill	Cuthbert Pepper
1601	Cuthbert Pepper	Talbot Bowes
1604	Sir John Savile	Richard Percevall
1614	Sir Talbot Bowes	Sir William Richardson
1621	Sir Talbot Bowes	William Bowes
1624	John Wandesford	Christopher Pepper
1625	Christopher Wandesford	Sir Talbot Bowes
1626	Christopher Wandesford	Matthew Hutton
1628	Sir Talbot Bowes	James Howell
1629–1640	No Parliaments summoned	

=== MPs 1640–1868 ===
Year	First member	First party	Second member	Second party
April 1640	Sir William Pennyman, Bt.	Royalist	Maulger Norton	
November 1640	Sir William Pennyman, Bt.	Royalist	Sir Thomas Danby	Royalist
August 1642	Pennyman disabled to sit (Pennyman died August 1643)		Sir Thomas Danby	Royalist
September 1642	Pennyman disabled to sit (Pennyman died August 1643)		Danby disabled to sit	
1645	Thomas Chaloner		Francis Thorpe	
1653	Richmond was unrepresented in Barebone's Parliament			
1654	John Wastal		Richmond had only one seat in the First and Second Parliaments of the Protectorate	
1656	John Bathurst		Richmond had only one seat in the First and Second Parliaments of the Protectorate	
January 1659	Sir Christopher Wyvill, Bt.		John Bathurst	
May 1659	Thomas Chaloner		Francis Thorpe	
April 1660	James Darcy		Sir Christopher Wyvill, Bt.	
1661	Sir John Yorke		Joseph Cradock	
1662	Sir John Yorke		John Wandesford	
1664	Sir William Killigrew		John Wandesford	
1665	Sir William Killigrew		Marmaduke Darcy	
1679	Humphrey Wharton		Thomas Cradock	
1681	Humphrey Wharton		John Darcy, Lord Conyers	
1685	Thomas Cradock		John Darcy, Lord Conyers	
January 1689	Thomas Yorke		John Darcy, Lord Conyers	
February 1689	Thomas Yorke		Philip Darcy	
1690	Sir Mark Milbanke, Bt		Theodore Bathurst	
1695	Thomas Yorke		Sir Marmaduke Wyvill, Bt.	
1698	Thomas Yorke		James Darcy	
1701	Thomas Yorke		John Hutton	
1702	Thomas Yorke		James Darcy	
May 1705	Thomas Yorke		Wharton Dunch	
December 1705	Thomas Yorke		William Walsh	
1708	Thomas Yorke		Harry Mordaunt	
1710	John Yorke	Whig	Harry Mordaunt	
1713	Thomas Yorke		Harry Mordaunt	
1717	John Yorke	Whig	Harry Mordaunt	
1720	John Yorke	Whig	Richard Abell	Whig
1722	John Yorke	Whig	Conyers Darcy	Whig
1727	Charles Bathurst		Sir Marmaduke Wyvill, Bt.	
1728	John Yorke	Whig	Sir Conyers Darcy	Whig
1747	John Yorke	Whig	Earl of Ancram	
1757	Thomas Yorke		Earl of Ancram	
1761	Sir Ralph Milbanke		Earl of Ancram	
1763	Sir Ralph Milbanke		Thomas Dundas	
March 1768	Alexander Wedderburn		Sir Lawrence Dundas, Bt	
November 1768	Alexander Wedderburn		William Norton	
1769	Charles John Crowle		William Norton	
1774	Thomas Dundas		Sir Lawrence Dundas, Bt	
January 1775	Thomas Dundas		Charles Dundas	
December 1775	William Norton		Charles Dundas	
1780	Marquess of Graham		Sir Lawrence Dundas, Bt	
1781	Marquess of Graham		George Fitzwilliam	
1784	Murrough O'Brien, 1st Marquess of Thomond		Charles Dundas	
1786	Murrough O'Brien, 1st Marquess of Thomond		Sir Grey Cooper	
1790	Murrough O'Brien, 1st Marquess of Thomond		Lawrence Dundas	Whig
1796	Charles George Beauclerk		Lawrence Dundas	Whig
1798	Arthur Shakespeare	Whig	Lawrence Dundas	Whig
1802	Arthur Shakespeare	Whig	George Dundas	Whig
1806	Arthur Shakespeare	Whig	Charles Lawrence Dundas	Whig
1808	Lawrence Dundas	Whig	Charles Lawrence Dundas	Whig
1810	Lawrence Dundas	Whig	Robert Chaloner	Whig
January 1812	George Dundas	Whig	Robert Chaloner	Whig
October 1812	Dudley Long North	Whig	Robert Chaloner	Whig
1818	Thomas Dundas	Whig	Viscount Maitland	Whig
1820	Thomas Dundas	Whig	Samuel Barrett Moulton Barrett	Whig
1828	Thomas Dundas	Whig	Sir Robert Dundas	Whig
1830	John Dundas	Whig	Sir Robert Dundas	Whig
1835	Alexander Speirs	Whig	Thomas Dundas	Whig
1839	Alexander Speirs	Whig	Sir Robert Dundas	Whig
February 1841	George Wentworth-FitzWilliam	Whig	Sir Robert Dundas	Whig
June 1841	John Dundas	Whig	William Ridley-Colborne	Whig
1846	John Dundas	Whig	Henry Rich	Whig
1847	Marmaduke Wyvill	Whig	Henry Rich	Whig
1859	Marmaduke Wyvill	Liberal	Henry Rich	Liberal
1861	Marmaduke Wyvill	Liberal	Sir Roundell Palmer	Liberal
1865	John Dundas	Liberal	Sir Roundell Palmer	Liberal
1866	Marmaduke Wyvill	Liberal	Sir Roundell Palmer	Liberal
Representation reduced to one member

=== 1868–2024 ===
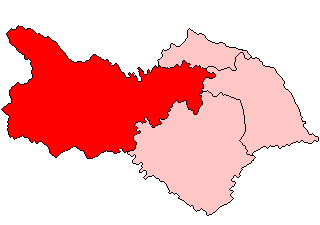
Richmond, 1918–1948, shown within the North Riding of Yorkshire.

Election	Member	Party
1868	Sir Roundell Palmer	Liberal
1872 by-election	Lawrence Dundas	Liberal
1873 by-election	John Dundas	Liberal
1885	Sir Frederick Milbank, Bt	Liberal
1886	George Elliot	Conservative
1895	John Hutton	Conservative
1906	Francis Dyke Acland	Liberal
Jan 1910	William Orde-Powlett	Conservative
1918	Sir Murrough Wilson	Unionist
1929	Thomas Dugdale	Conservative
1959	Timothy Kitson	Conservative
1983	Leon Brittan	Conservative
1989 by-election	William Hague	Conservative
2015	Rishi Sunak	Conservative
2024	Constituency abolished See Richmond and Northallerton	

== Election results 1831–2019 ==
=== Elections in the 2010s ===
General election 2019: Richmond (Yorks)
Party	Candidate	Votes	%	±%
Conservative	Rishi Sunak	36,693	63.6	−0.3
Labour	Thomas Kirkwood	9,483	16.4	−7.0
Liberal Democrats	Philip Knowles	6,989	12.1	+6.2
Green	John Yorke	2,500	4.3	+1.2
Yorkshire	Laurence Waterhouse	1,077	1.9	−1.8
Independent	Nick Jardine	961	1.7	New
Majority		27,210	47.2	+6.7
Turnout		57,703	69.9	−0.6
Conservative hold		Swing	+3.3	

General election 2017: Richmond (Yorks)
Party	Candidate	Votes	%	±%
Conservative	Rishi Sunak	36,458	63.9	+12.5
Labour	Dan Perry	13,350	23.4	+10.2
Liberal Democrats	Tobie Abel	3,360	5.9	−0.5
Yorkshire	Chris Pearson	2,106	3.7	New
Green	Fiona Yorke	1,739	3.1	−1.2
Majority		23,108	40.5	+4.3
Turnout		57,013	70.5	+5.8
Conservative hold		Swing	+1.2	

General election 2015: Richmond (Yorks)
Party	Candidate	Votes	%	±%
Conservative	Rishi Sunak	27,744	51.4	−11.4
UKIP	Matthew Cooke	8,194	15.2	New
Labour	Mike Hill	7,124	13.2	−2.1
Liberal Democrats	John Harris	3,465	6.4	−12.7
Independent	John Blackie	3,348	6.2	New
Green	Leslie Rowe	2,313	4.3	+1.5
Independent	Robin Scott	1,811	3.4	New
Majority		19,550	36.2	−7.5
Turnout		53,999	64.7	−2.5
Conservative hold		Swing	−13.3	

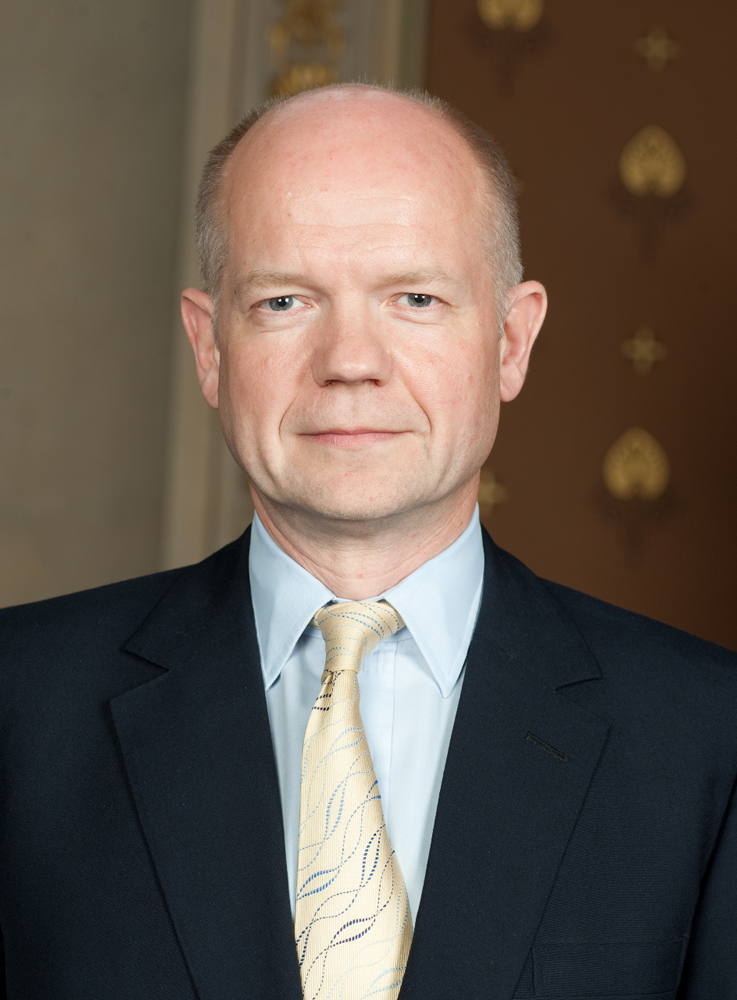
William Hague

General election 2010: Richmond (Yorks)
Party	Candidate	Votes	%	±%
Conservative	William Hague	33,541 (Note: This was the Conservative Party's highest vote share in the 2010 General Election, with William Hague securing 62.8% of the vote.)	62.8	+3.5
Liberal Democrats	Lawrence Meredith	10,205	19.1	+2.2
Labour	Eileen Driver	8,150	15.3	−5.3
Green	Leslie Rowe	1,516	2.8	−0.3
Majority		23,336	43.7	+4.1
Turnout		53,412	67.2	+2.6
Conservative hold		Swing	+4.4	

=== Elections in the 2000s ===
General election 2005: Richmond (Yorks)
Party	Candidate	Votes	%	±%
Conservative	William Hague	26,722	59.1	+0.2
Labour	Neil Foster	8,915	19.7	−2.2
Liberal Democrats	Jacquie Bell	7,982	17.7	−0.2
Green	Leslie Rowe	1,581	3.5	New
Majority		17,807	39.4	+2.4
Turnout		45,200	65.0	−2.4
Conservative hold		Swing	+1.2	

General election 2001: Richmond (Yorks)
Party	Candidate	Votes	%	±%
Conservative	William Hague	25,951	58.9	+10.0
Labour Co-op	Fay Tinnion	9,632	21.9	−5.9
Liberal Democrats	Thomas Forth	7,890	17.9	−0.5
Monster Raving Loony	Boney Steniforth	561	1.3	New
Majority		16,319	37.0	+15.9
Turnout		44,034	67.4	−6.0
Conservative hold		Swing	+8.0	

=== Elections in the 1990s ===
General election 1997: Richmond (Yorks)
Party	Candidate	Votes	%	±%
Conservative	William Hague	23,326	48.9	−13.0
Labour Co-op	Steven Merritt	13,275	27.8	+16.2
Liberal Democrats	Jane Harvey	8,773	18.4	−7.3
Referendum	Alex Bentley	2,367	5.0	New
Majority		10,051	21.1	−15.1
Turnout		47,741	73.4	−5.0
Conservative hold		Swing	−13.9	

General election 1992: Richmond (Yorks)
Party	Candidate	Votes	%	±%
Conservative	William Hague	40,202	61.9	+0.7
Liberal Democrats	George Irwin	16,698	25.7	−1.3
Labour	Ross Cranston	7,523	11.6	−0.2
Independent	A. Michael Barr	570	0.9	New
Majority		23,504	36.2	+2.0
Turnout		64,993	78.4	+6.3
Conservative hold		Swing	+1.0	

=== Elections in the 1980s ===
1989 Richmond (Yorks) by-election
Party	Candidate	Votes	%	±%
Conservative	William Hague	19,543	37.2	−24.0
SDP	Mike Potter	16,909	32.2	New
SLD	Barbara Pearce	11,589	22.1	−4.9
Labour	Frank Robson	2,591	4.9	−6.9
Green	Robert Upshall	1,473	2.8	New
Monster Raving Loony	Screaming Lord Sutch	167	0.3	New
Independent	Anthony Millns	113	0.2	New
Corrective Party	Lindi St Clair	106	0.2	New
Liberal	Nicholas Watkins	70	0.1	New
Majority		2,634	5.0	−29.2
Turnout		52,561	64.4	−7.7
Conservative hold		Swing		

General election 1987: Richmond (Yorks)
Party	Candidate	Votes	%	±%
Conservative	Leon Brittan	34,995	61.2	−1.4
Liberal	David Lloyd-Williams	15,419	27.0	−0.7
Labour	Frank Robson	6,737	11.8	+2.1
Majority		19,576	34.2	−0.7
Turnout		57,151	72.1	+3.4
Conservative hold		Swing	−0.3	

General election 1983: Richmond (Yorks)
Party	Candidate	Votes	%	±%
Conservative	Leon Brittan	32,373	62.6	
Liberal	David Raw	14,307	27.7	
Labour Co-op	Barbara Hawkins	4,997	9.7	
Majority		18,066	34.9	
Turnout		51,677	68.7	−3.4
Conservative hold		Swing		

=== Elections in the 1970s ===
General election 1979: Richmond (Yorks)
Party	Candidate	Votes	%	±%
Conservative	Timothy Kitson	28,958	61.5	+4.6
Liberal	G. Hodgson	9,964	21.1	−2.3
Labour	Ken Bratton	8,173	17.4	−2.3
Majority		18,994	40.4	+6.9
Turnout		47,095	72.1	−3.4
Conservative hold		Swing	+3.5	

General election October 1974: Richmond (Yorks)
Party	Candidate	Votes	%	±%
Conservative	Timothy Kitson	23,156	56.9	−1.3
Liberal	P. Waudby	9,528	23.4	−1.9
Labour	Ian Wilkie	8,025	19.7	+3.2
Majority		13,628	33.5	+0.6
Turnout		40,709	65.7	−9.8
Conservative hold		Swing	+0.3	

General election February 1974: Richmond (Yorks)
Party	Candidate	Votes	%	±%
Conservative	Timothy Kitson	26,994	58.2	−4.6
Liberal	Elizabeth May Graham	11,727	25.3	+14.3
Labour	Edward Pearce	7,659	16.5	−9.7
Majority		15,267	32.9	−3.7
Turnout		46,380	75.5	+6.1
Conservative hold		Swing	-9.5	

General election 1970: Richmond (Yorks)
Party	Candidate	Votes	%	±%
Conservative	Timothy Kitson	30,471	62.8	+6.2
Labour	Michael Aldrich	12,702	26.2	+1.6
Liberal	John R. Smithson	5,354	11.0	−7.8
Majority		17,769	36.6	+4.6
Turnout		48,527	68.4	−2.9
Conservative hold		Swing	+2.3	

=== Elections in the 1960s ===
General election 1966: Richmond (Yorks)
Party	Candidate	Votes	%	±%
Conservative	Timothy Kitson	23,541	56.6	−2.3
Labour	W. Patrick Lisle	10,210	24.6	+3.9
Liberal	Clifford Keith Wain Schellenberg	7,824	18.8	−1.6
Majority		13,331	32.0	−6.2
Turnout		41,575	71.3	−4.3
Conservative hold		Swing		

General election 1964: Richmond (Yorks)
Party	Candidate	Votes	%	±%
Conservative	Timothy Kitson	25,345	58.9	−16.5
Labour	Gordon A. Knott	8,908	20.7	−3.9
Liberal	Clifford Keith Wain Schellenberg	8,787	20.4	New
Majority		16,437	38.2	−12.7
Turnout		43,040	75.6	+4.1
Conservative hold		Swing		

=== Elections in the 1950s ===
General election 1959: Richmond (Yorks)
Party	Candidate	Votes	%	±%
Conservative	Timothy Kitson	28,270	75.44	
Labour	Mabel McMillan	9,203	24.56	
Majority		19,067	50.88	
Turnout		37,473	71.49	
Conservative hold		Swing		

General election 1955: Richmond (Yorks)
Party	Candidate	Votes	%	±%
Conservative	Thomas Dugdale	24,979	73.57	
Labour	Richard Hoyle	8,974	26.43	
Majority		16,005	47.14	
Turnout		33,953	67.25	
Conservative hold		Swing		

General election 1951: Richmond (Yorks)
Party	Candidate	Votes	%	±%
Conservative	Thomas Dugdale	26,231	70.62	
Labour	Richard Hoyle	10,915	29.38	
Majority		15,316	41.24	
Turnout		37,146	74.36	
Conservative hold		Swing		

General election 1950: Richmond (Yorks)
Party	Candidate	Votes	%	±%
Conservative	Thomas Dugdale	22,999	59.20	
Labour	F.W. Beaton	8,694	22.38	
Liberal	Douglas Eugene Moore	7,157	18.42	
Majority		14,305	36.82	
Turnout		38,850	74.36	
Conservative hold		Swing		

=== Elections in the 1940s ===
General election 1945: Richmond (Yorks)
Party	Candidate	Votes	%	±%
Conservative	Thomas Dugdale	18,332	52.87	−24.1
Liberal	M.W. Darwin	9,427	27.19	New
Labour	George Henry Metcalfe	6,104	17.60	−5.1
Common Wealth	Roy Norman Chesterton	813	2.34	New
Majority		8,905	25.68	−28.6
Turnout		34,676	68.38	+0.3
Conservative hold		Swing		

=== Elections in the 1930s ===
General election 1935: Richmond (Yorks)
Party	Candidate	Votes	%	±%
Conservative	Thomas Dugdale	25,088	77.03	
Labour	Alfred Jonathan Best	7,369	22.70	New
Majority		17,719	54.33	
Turnout		32,457	68.10	
Conservative hold		Swing		

General election 1931: Richmond (Yorks)
Party	Candidate	Votes	%	±%
Conservative	Thomas Dugdale	Unopposed	N/A	N/A
Conservative hold				

=== Elections in the 1920s ===
General election 1929: Richmond (Yorks)
Party	Candidate	Votes	%	±%
Unionist	Thomas Dugdale	19,763	57.5	N/A
Liberal	John Dixon Hinks	14,634	42.5	New
Majority		5,129	15.0	N/A
Turnout		34,397	79.4	N/A
Unionist hold		Swing	N/A	

General election 1924: Richmond (Yorks)
Party	Candidate	Votes	%	±%
Unionist	Murrough Wilson	Unopposed	N/A	N/A
Unionist hold				

General election 1923: Richmond (Yorks)
Party	Candidate	Votes	%	±%
Unionist	Murrough Wilson	Unopposed	N/A	N/A
Unionist hold				

General election 1922: Richmond (Yorks)
Party	Candidate	Votes	%	±%
Unionist	Murrough Wilson	Unopposed	N/A	N/A
Unionist hold				

== Election results 1868–1918 ==
=== Elections in the 1860s ===
General election 1868: Richmond (Yorks)
Party	Candidate	Votes	%	±%
Liberal	Roundell Palmer	375	81.2	N/A
Liberal	William Henry Roberts	87	18.8	N/A
Majority		288	62.4	N/A
Turnout		462	71.1	N/A
Registered electors		650		
Liberal hold		Swing	N/A	

=== Elections in the 1870s ===
Palmer resigned after being appointed Lord Chancellor and being elevated to the peerage, becoming Lord Selborne.

By-election, 7 November 1872: Richmond (Yorks)
Party	Candidate	Votes	%	±%
Liberal	Lawrence Dundas	314	57.9	−42.1
Independent Liberal	Charles Edward Brunskill Cooke	228	42.1	New
Majority		86	15.8	N/A
Turnout		542	79.5	N/A
Registered electors		682		
Liberal hold		Swing	N/A	

Dundas succeeded to the peerage, becoming Earl of Zetland.

By-election, 27 May 1873: Richmond (Yorks)
Party	Candidate	Votes	%	±%
Liberal	John Dundas	Unopposed		
Liberal hold				

General election 1874: Richmond (Yorks)
Party	Candidate	Votes	%	±%
Liberal	John Dundas	313	54.7	N/A
Independent Liberal	Charles Edward Brunskill Cooke	259	45.3	N/A
Majority		54	9.4	−53.0
Turnout		572	81.0	+9.9
Registered electors		706		
Liberal hold		Swing	N/A	

=== Elections in the 1880s ===
General election 1880: Richmond (Yorks)
Party	Candidate	Votes	%	±%
Liberal	John Dundas	447	75.8	+21.1
Conservative	George Swinburne-King	143	24.2	New
Majority		304	51.6	+42.2
Turnout		590	84.8	+3.8
Registered electors		696		
Liberal hold		Swing	N/A	

General election 1885: Richmond (Yorks)
Party	Candidate	Votes	%	±%
Liberal	Frederick Milbank	4,869	53.0	−22.8
Conservative	George Elliot	4,320	47.0	+22.8
Majority		549	6.0	−45.6
Turnout		9,189	81.8	−3.0
Registered electors		11,237		
Liberal hold		Swing	−22.8	

General election 1886: Richmond (Yorks)
Party	Candidate	Votes	%	±%
Conservative	George Elliot	4,810	55.5	+8.5
Liberal	Edmund Turton	3,859	44.5	−8.5
Majority		951	11.0	N/A
Turnout		8,669	77.1	−4.7
Registered electors		11,237		
Conservative gain from Liberal		Swing	+8.5	

=== Elections in the 1890s ===
General election 1892: Richmond (Yorks)
Party	Candidate	Votes	%	±%
Conservative	George Elliot	4,340	50.9	−4.6
Liberal	Edmund Turton	4,181	49.1	+4.6
Majority		159	1.8	−9.2
Turnout		8,521	79.9	+2.8
Registered electors		10,669		
Conservative hold		Swing	-4.6	

Hutton

General election 1895: Richmond (Yorks)
Party	Candidate	Votes	%	±%
Conservative	John Hutton	4,555	53.4	+2.5
Liberal	Edmund Turton	3,971	46.6	−2.5
Majority		584	6.8	+5.0
Turnout		8,526	79.9	0.0
Registered electors		10,669		
Conservative hold		Swing	+2.5	

=== Elections in the 1900s ===
Howard

General election 1900: Richmond (Yorks)
Party	Candidate	Votes	%	±%
Conservative	John Hutton	4,573	59.5	+6.1
Liberal	Geoffrey Howard	3,117	40.5	−6.1
Majority		1,456	19.0	+12.2
Turnout		7,690	74.2	−5.7
Registered electors		10,369		
Conservative hold		Swing	+6.1	

Acland

General election 1906: Richmond (Yorks)
Party	Candidate	Votes	%	±%
Liberal	Francis Dyke Acland	4,470	50.6	+10.1
Conservative	Lawrence Dundas	4,368	49.4	−10.1
Majority		102	1.2	N/A
Turnout		8,838	87.4	+13.2
Registered electors		10,112		
Liberal gain from Conservative		Swing	+10.1	

=== Elections in the 1910s ===
General election January 1910: Richmond (Yorks)
Party	Candidate	Votes	%	±%
Conservative	William Orde-Powlett	5,246	55.8	+6.4
Liberal	Francis Dyke Acland	4,163	44.2	−6.4
Majority		1,083	11.6	N/A
Turnout		9,409	89.7	+2.3
Registered electors		10,485		
Conservative gain from Liberal		Swing	+6.4	

General election December 1910: Richmond (Yorks)
Party	Candidate	Votes	%	±%
Conservative	William Orde-Powlett	Unopposed		
Conservative hold				

General Election 1914–15:

Another General Election was required to take place before the end of 1915. The political parties had been making preparations for an election to take place and by July 1914, the following candidates had been selected;

- Unionist: William Orde-Powlett
- Liberal:

General election 1918: Richmond (Yorks)
Party		Candidate	Votes	%	±%
C	Unionist	Murrough Wilson	9,857	66.8	N/A
	National Farmers Union	William Parlour	4,907	33.2	New
Majority			4,950	33.6	N/A
Turnout			14,764	48.1	N/A
	Unionist hold		Swing		
C indicates candidate endorsed by the coalition government.

== Election results 1832–1868 ==
=== Elections in the 1830s ===
General election 1832: Richmond (Yorks)
Party	Candidate	Votes	%
Whig	Robert Lawrence Dundas	Unopposed	
Whig	John Dundas	Unopposed	
Registered electors		273	
Whig hold			
Whig hold			

General election 1835: Richmond (Yorks)
Party	Candidate	Votes	%
Whig	Thomas Dundas	Unopposed	
Whig	Alexander Speirs	Unopposed	
Registered electors		278	
Whig hold			
Whig hold			

General election 1837: Richmond (Yorks)
Party	Candidate	Votes	%
Whig	Thomas Dundas	Unopposed	
Whig	Alexander Speirs	Unopposed	
Registered electors		272	
Whig hold			
Whig hold			

Dundas succeeded to the peerage, becoming 2nd Earl of Zetland and causing a by-election.

By-election, 12 March 1839: Richmond (Yorks)
Party	Candidate	Votes	%
Whig	Robert Lawrence Dundas	162	66.9
Conservative	Miles Thomas Stapleton, 8th Baron Beaumont	80	33.1
Majority		82	33.8
Turnout		242	85.2
Registered electors		284	
Whig hold			

=== Elections in the 1840s ===
Speirs resigned by accepting the office of Steward of the Chiltern Hundreds, causing a by-election.

By-election, 16 February 1841: Richmond (Yorks)
Party	Candidate	Votes	%	±%
Whig	George Wentworth-FitzWilliam	Unopposed		
Registered electors		276		
Whig hold				

General election 1841: Richmond (Yorks)
Party	Candidate	Votes	%	±%
Whig	John Dundas	Unopposed		
Whig	William Ridley-Colborne	Unopposed		
Registered electors		276		
Whig hold				
Whig hold				

Colborne's death caused a by-election.

By-election, 8 April 1846: Richmond (Yorks)
Party	Candidate	Votes	%	±%
Whig	Henry Rich	Unopposed		
Whig hold				

Rich was appointed a Lord Commissioner of the Treasury, causing a by-election.

By-election, 13 July 1846: Richmond (Yorks)
Party	Candidate	Votes	%	±%
Whig	Henry Rich	Unopposed		
Whig hold				

General election 1847: Richmond (Yorks)
Party	Candidate	Votes	%	±%
Whig	Marmaduke Wyvill	Unopposed		
Whig	Henry Rich	Unopposed		
Registered electors		283		
Whig hold				
Whig hold				

=== Elections in the 1850s ===
General election 1852: Richmond (Yorks)
Party	Candidate	Votes	%	±%
Whig	Marmaduke Wyvill	Unopposed		
Whig	Henry Rich	Unopposed		
Registered electors		243		
Whig hold				
Whig hold				

General election 1857: Richmond (Yorks)
Party	Candidate	Votes	%	±%
Whig	Marmaduke Wyvill	Unopposed		
Whig	Henry Rich	Unopposed		
Registered electors		342		
Whig hold				
Whig hold				

General election 1859: Richmond (Yorks)
Party	Candidate	Votes	%	±%
Liberal	Marmaduke Wyvill	Unopposed		
Liberal	Henry Rich	Unopposed		
Registered electors		327		
Liberal hold				
Liberal hold				

=== Elections in the 1860s ===
Rich's resignation caused a by-election.

By-election, 9 July 1861: Richmond (Yorks)
Party	Candidate	Votes	%	±%
Liberal	Roundell Palmer	Unopposed		
Liberal hold				

Palmer was appointed Attorney General for England and Wales, causing a by-election.

By-election, 17 October 1863: Richmond (Yorks)
Party	Candidate	Votes	%	±%
Liberal	Roundell Palmer	Unopposed		
Liberal hold				

General election 1865: Richmond (Yorks)
Party	Candidate	Votes	%	±%
Liberal	Roundell Palmer	Unopposed		
Liberal	John Dundas	Unopposed		
Registered electors		316		
Liberal hold				
Liberal hold				

Dundas' death caused a by-election.

By-election, 6 March 1866: Richmond (Yorks)
Party	Candidate	Votes	%	±%
Liberal	Marmaduke Wyvill	213	94.2	N/A
Liberal	William Henry Roberts	13	5.8	N/A
Majority		200	88.4	N/A
Turnout		226	71.5	N/A
Registered electors		316		
Liberal hold		Swing	N/A	

== Pre–1832 election results ==
=== Elections in the 1830s ===
General election 1830: Richmond (Yorks)
Party	Candidate	Votes	%
Whig	Robert Lawrence Dundas	Unopposed	
Whig	John Dundas	Unopposed	
Whig hold			
Whig hold			

General election 1831: Richmond (Yorks)
Party	Candidate	Votes	%
Whig	Robert Lawrence Dundas	Unopposed	
Whig	John Dundas	Unopposed	
Registered electors		273	
Whig hold			
Whig hold			

== See also ==
- List of parliamentary constituencies in North Yorkshire

== Sources ==
- D. Brunton & D. H. Pennington, Members of the Long Parliament (London: George Allen & Unwin, 1954)
- Cobbett's Parliamentary history of England, from the Norman Conquest in 1066 to the year 1803 (London: Thomas Hansard, 1808)
- F. W. S. Craig, British Parliamentary Election Results 1832–1885 (2nd edition, Aldershot: Parliamentary Research Services, 1989)
- J. Holladay Philbin, Parliamentary Representation 1832 – England and Wales (New Haven: Yale University Press, 1965)
- Henry Stooks Smith, The Parliaments of England from 1715 to 1847 (2nd edition, edited by FWS Craig – Chichester: Parliamentary Reference Publications, 1973)
- The Constitutional Yearbook for 1913 (London: National Unionist Association)

Parliament of the United Kingdom
Preceded by Huntingdon	Constituency represented by the leader of the opposition 1997–2001	Succeeded by Chingford and Woodford Green
Preceded by Bromsgrove	Constituency represented by the chancellor of the Exchequer; 2020–2022	Succeeded by Stratford-on-Avon
Preceded by South West Norfolk	Constituency represented by the prime minister 2022–2024	Succeeded by Richmond and Northallerton
