= Wandesford =

Wandesford may refer to:

- Christopher Wandesford (1592–1640), English administrator and Member of Parliament
- John Wandesford (1593–1665), English Member of Parliament
- Michael Wandesford, an Anglican priest in the early seventeenth century.
- Sir Rowland Wandesford (c. 1560-c. 1652), attorney of the Court of Wards and Liveries

== See also ==
- Christopher Wandesford (disambiguation)
