= Matthew Hutton =

Matthew Hutton may refer to:

- Matthew Hutton (archbishop of York) (1529–1606), Archbishop of York
- Matthew Hutton (MP) (1597–1666), English politician
- Matthew Hutton (antiquary) (1639–1711), English antiquarian
- Matthew Hutton (archbishop of Canterbury) (1693–1758), Archbishop of both York and later Canterbury
