= Christopher Pepper =

16th-century English politician

Christopher Pepper (1566/7 – 1635), of St Martins, Richmond, Yorkshire, was an English lawyer and politician.

== Family ==
He was the son and heir of John Pepper of St Martins and his wife Anne. He married Margaret (d. 1619), daughter of John Smith of Easby, Richmondshire. Their son William died in 1620, leaving a son John. He was a cousin of Cuthbert Pepper.

== Career ==
He was probably the Christopher Peper who matriculated at Trinity College, Cambridge in 1583 He entered Gray's Inn from Barnard's Inn in November 1587 and was called to the bar in May 1593. Thereafter he was active as a lawyer in Yorkshire and in 1603 succeeded his cousin Cuthbert as recorder of Richmond. He served town as Member (MP) in 1624, when Sir Talbot Bowes was mayor and so unable to sit. He also served as a Justice of the peace for the North Riding of Yorkshire between 1616 and 1628.

He died in March 1635 and was buried in St Mary's, Richmond.

Parliament of England
Preceded by Sir Talbot Bowes; William Bowes	Member of Parliament for Richmond, Yorkshire; 1624; With: John Wandesford	Succeeded by Sir Talbot Bowes; Christopher Wandesford
