= Maulger Norton =

English politician

Maulger Norton (born ca. 1593) was an English politician who sat in the House of Commons in 1640.

Norton was the son of Robert Norton of Swinton, South Yorkshire and his wife, Catherine Stavely, daughter of John Stavely, of Swinton who left his estates to his daughter.

In April 1640, Norton was elected Member of Parliament for Richmond in the Short Parliament.

During the Civil War, Norton raised funds for the Royalist cause. He and his son compounded in 1644.

In 1665 Norton was of St Nicholas, near Richmond, Yorkshire, aged seventy-two.

By 1667 Norton was a receiver of crown revenues for Durham, Northumberland and Richmond. In September of that year he got into difficulties and was called in for a review of his accounts. Proceedings were issued against his estate and he was put into custody, to be released on 16 September. By September 1669 he was suspended from receiving rents for Northumberland and Durham and the archdeaconry of Richmond.

Norton married Ann Wandesford, daughter of Sir George Wandesford, of Kirklington, Yorkshire and sister of Christopher Wandesford. They had two sons, John and Michael, and a daughter Mary who married Sir John Yorke, MP for Richmond

Parliament of England
Vacant Parliament suspended since 1629	Member of Parliament for Richmond; 1640; With: Sir William Pennyman, 1st Baronet	Succeeded by Sir William Pennyman, 1st Baronet; Sir Thomas Danby
