= John Yorke (1633–1663) =

English politician born in 1633

Sir John Yorke (1633–1663) was an English politician, who sat in the House of Commons as member for the Richmond constituency in the North Riding of Yorkshire from 1661 to 1663.

== Family background ==
John Yorke was born at Gouthwaite in Nidderdale, then in the West Riding of Yorkshire, in 1633, the son of John Yorke (c.1592-1638) and his second wife Katharine Daniel, a daughter of Sir Ingelby Daniel of Beswick and sister of the poet George Daniel.

== Career ==
At the age of 4 he inherited his father's estates in Nidderdale. In 1658 he married Mary, daughter of Maulger Norton, his father's executor and MP for Richmond in 1640. Through his marriage he acquired property in Richmond. He was knighted at the Restoration court by Charles II in 1660.

He was elected member for Richmond in the Cavalier Parliament of 1661. He became a friend of Lord Wharton, and was appointed to ten committees, but died near London on 3 April 1663. He was buried in St Chad's Church, Middlesmoor in Nidderdale, where he is commemorated by an inscription in Latin.

John and Mary had one son, Thomas (born in 1658) and a daughter Mary, born in 1662.

Parliament of England
Preceded by James Darcy; Sir Christopher Wyvill, 3rd Baronet	Member of Parliament for Richmond; 1661–1663; With: Joseph Cradock; John Wandesford 1662-1663	Succeeded by Sir William Killigrew; John Wandesford
