= Elizabeth Danby =

English recusant noblewoman

- Died: 1629

Elizabeth Danby born Elizabeth Wentworth (died 1629) was an English recusant noblewoman. She was the wife of Sir Thomas Danby. She managed the family fortune when her son inherited at the age of eight.

== Life ==
Danby's parents were Thomas Wentworth and Margaret Gascoigne or Gascoyne. Her mother was the heiress of Gawthorpe. She married Sir Thomas Danby who was the son of another Sir Thomas Danby (1530-1590). He died on 3 Jan 1582 and she continued to be based at Pott Grange. She was a widow when her father-in-law died and her son Christopher Danby (1582–1624) inherited his fortune although he was eight years old. Her son's wardship was initially assigned to Thomas Cecil who was the eldest son of Lord Burghley, but this was changed so that Elizabeth could take on the responsibility.

She was said to be a benefactress. She was a Catholic and she did not hide her beliefs. She had her own priest and she employed a tutor who did not take communion. She and her household did not have a home and this may have been to avoid the attention of anyone who wanted to report her recusant behaviour. This did not work as in time she was fined for harbouring other recusants. Her son was 21 years old in 1603.

Her son did not appear to be a good landlord. The family lost a lot of money due to a manager that they employed who, like her son, was also called Christopher Danby. The manager used his authority to allow the family's tenants to renew their tenancies without paying any rent increase. In return they would make sure he benefitted. Their manager had not maintained the family's mansion and he had defrauded them of £7,000 over the period of 1608–1609. The case went to the star chamber in 1610.

Her son sold land and gathered debts. He married and was to have received a £1,000 dowry but the money never arrived. Her son Christopher died in 1624 and he was succeeded by her grandson, (another) Thomas Danby.

Elizabeth died in 1629. There is a plaque on the wall of Church of St Mary the Virgin in Masham that records the lives of her and her husband.
