= Christopher Wandesford (disambiguation) =

Sir Christopher Wandesford (1592–1640) was MP for Aldborough, Richmond and Thirsk and Lord Deputy of Ireland, 1640.

Christopher Wandesford may also refer to:

- Sir Christopher Wandesford, 1st Baronet (1628–1687), of the Wandesford Baronets
- Christopher Wandesford, 1st Viscount Castlecomer (1656–1707), Viscount Castlecomer
- Christopher Wandesford, 2nd Viscount Castlecomer (1684–1719)
- Christopher Wandesford, 3rd Viscount Castlecomer (1717–1736), Viscount Castlecomer
