= Alice Thornton =

English writer (1626–1707)

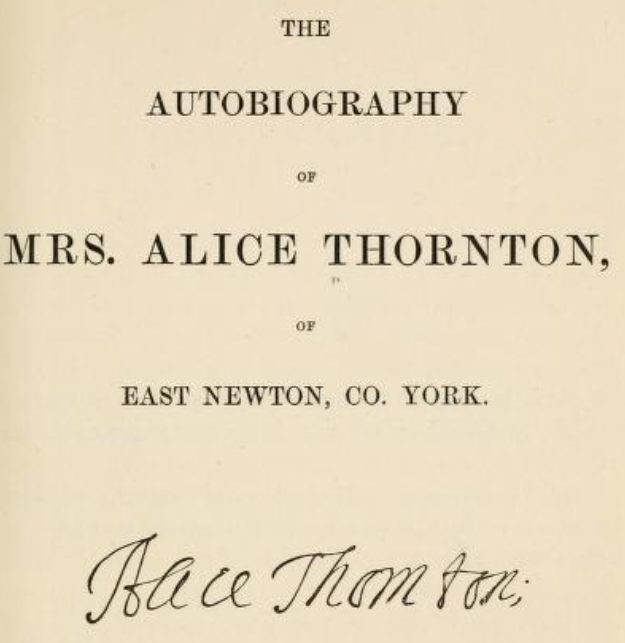
- Born: Alice Wandesford; 13 February 1626; Kirklington, North Riding of Yorkshire, England
- Died: 1707 (aged 80–81); East Newton, England
- Occupation: Writer
- Writing career
- Genre: Autobiography
- Notable works: The Autobiography of Mrs Alice Thornton, of East Newtown, Co. York (c. 1875, adapted from Alice's original untitled manuscripts); My First Booke of My Life (c. 2014, adapted from Alice's original untitled manuscripts)

Alice Thornton (née Wandesford; 13 February 1626 – January 1707) was an English writer during the 17th century. She penned four different versions of her autobiography, which offer insight into gentry life as a woman during the Irish Rebellion of 1641 and the English Civil War.

== Life ==
Alice Thornton was born in Kirklington, North Yorkshire on 13 February 1626 to Christopher Wandesford (1592-1640) and Alice Osborne (1593-1659). In 1633 the family moved to Ireland after her father's friend and mentor, Thomas Wentworth, had been made Lord Deputy of Ireland and offered Christopher a position as Master of the Rolls. Alice spent her childhood in the company of Wentworth's daughters, Anne and Arabella. After Wentworth was recalled to England in 1640, Alice's father succeeded him as Lord Deputy; however, after a brief illness believed to be severe fever, Wandesford died on 3 December 1640, less than a year after assuming the position.

During the Irish Rebellion Alice's mother and her children were forced to flee from their home and return to Yorkshire. In the ensuing chaos, Wandesford's will and testament were lost and, while it was ultimately found in 1653, disputes over his estate caused bitter strife within the family and years of litigation between them.

In 1651 Alice wed William Thornton (1624-1668), a member of the lesser gentry in Ryedale chosen by her family, whose parliamentarian connections helped to recover their lands confiscated during the English Civil War. Alice and William ultimately moved to East Newton in 1662. During their marriage Alice gave birth to nine children; however only three survived infancy: their second child, Alice ("Nally") (1654-1721); their fourth, Katherine (1656-1726); and their seventh, Robert (1662-1692).

The Thornton family's finances were often in peril, only worsening in 1668 when William died without a will and in considerable debt.

Shortly after William's death Alice's then-14-year-old daughter, Nally, wed Thomas Comber, the local minister. The scandal surrounding this event, likely due to the suddenness of the marriage and Nally's young age at the time, were among many topics Alice would later discuss in her writings. Nally and her husband had nine children, and she inherited her mother's manuscripts upon Alice's death in 1707.

Katherine's brother-in-law, Thomas Comber, aided in arranging her marriage to Thomas Purchas in 1682 and they had five children. Following Purchas's death in 1697, Katherine married Robert Danby in 1698—notably without her mother's approval.

Robert attended Sidney Sussex College, Cambridge in 1680 and moved to University College, Oxford in 1682. He became the rector of Oddington, Gloucestershire in 1687 but resigned later the same year, and in 1689 he was working as a chaplain on a naval ship. In 1691 Robert went to live with his sister Nally and Thomas Comber in Durham. In 1692 Thomas attempted to arrange marriage for Robert; however Robert fell ill and died in June of that year.

Alice continued to live in East Newton until her death in January of 1707, just shy of her 81st birthday.

== Legacy ==
Upon her death Alice bequeathed three manuscript books of what she described as "my own Mediations and Transactions of my life, and all the residue of my Papers and Books written with my own hand" to her daughter Nally (Alice) Comber. Alice's manuscripts chronicle her life, including her childhood in Ireland, return to England during the civil war and her experiences as a wife and mother. They also describe her feelings on a number of more emotional topics including her strong religious faith, royalist views and the difficulties she experienced following the deaths of her husband as well as six of their nine children (due in part to the high infant mortality rate at the time).

Alice's manuscripts were originally edited by Charles Jackson in 1875 for the Surtees Society and titled The Autobiography of Mrs. Alice Thornton, of East Newton, Co. York. This created a single narrative from the three original books by placing their events in chronological order, which remained the only published representation of her writings for more than a century.

In 2005 Raymond A. Anselment, a professor of English at the University of Connecticut, wrote an article titled ‘Seventeenth-Century Manuscript Sources of Alice Thornton's Life’, which appeared in SEL: Studies in English Literature 1500–1900. The abstract of Professor Anselment's article echoed prior concerns about the Surtees Society publication, stating in part: "When the Surtees Society published the only edition of Alice Thornton's autobiography, it omitted and restructured parts of this seventeenth-century gentry woman's self-representation. [...] An analysis of the editorial changes that limit Thornton's intent reveals the complex dimensions of this domestic and spiritual memoir."

The first and third manuscripts of Alice's life re-emerged and were acquired by the British Library in 2009. In 2014, a new release of Alice's memoirs titled My First Booke of My Life was published, purportedly restoring almost half the text omitted from the Surtees edition.

Between 2018 and 2019 Cordelia Beattie, a professor of Women's and Gender History at the University of Edinburgh, located the third manuscript in Durham Cathedral Library, where it had been misidentified in their catalogue since its arrival in 1969. Beattie also came across a smaller previously unknown text, ‘Book of Remembrances’, written in Alice's hand and kept for centuries by her son-in-law Thomas Comber's family.

In 2021 Beattie was awarded an Arts and Humanities Research Council grant in support of her project to make Alice's complete works in her words accessible in a digital edition. Partners and funders of the project include the University of Edinburgh, Durham Cathedral, and King's College's Digital Lab. Completed reproductions are available for viewing on the project's website, and readers are able to "trace people, places and events across all four Books" thanks to the site's use of Text Encoding Initiative guidelines.
