= 1872 Richmond (Yorks) by-election =

UK Parliamentary by-election

The 1872 Richmond (Yorkshire) by-election was held on 4 November 1872. The by-election was held due to the elevation to the peerage in order to become the Lord Chancellor of the incumbent MP of the Liberal Party, Roundell Palmer. It was won by the Liberal candidate Lawrence Dundas.
