= 1873 Richmond (Yorks) by-election =

UK Parliamentary by-election

The 1873 Richmond (Yorkshire) by-election was held on 27 May 1873. The by-election was held due to the Succession to a peerage of the incumbent MP of the Liberal Party, Lawrence Dundas. It was won by his younger brother, the unopposed Liberal candidate John Dundas.
