= Matthew Hutton (MP) =

English politician

Matthew Hutton (20 October 1597 – 1666) was an English politician who sat in the House of Commons from 1626.

Hutton was the son of Sir Timothy Hutton (son of Matthew Hutton, Archbishop of York), Sheriff of Yorkshire in 1606, and his wife Elizabeth Bowes (daughter of Sir George Bowes).

He matriculated from Trinity College, Cambridge at Easter 1615. In 1626, he was elected Member of Parliament for Richmond. He was a noted Royalist in the Civil War.

Hutton married Barbara Darcy, daughter of Sir Conyers Darcy, in 1617.

Parliament of England
| Preceded by Christopher Wandesford; Sir Talbot Bowes | Member of Parliament for Richmond; 1626; With: Christopher Wandesford | Succeeded by Sir Talbot Bowes; James Howell |
