= 1989 Richmond (Yorks) by-election =

UK parliamentary by-election

- 23 February 1989

Richmond (Yorkshire) constituency
- Turnout: 64.4% (▼7.7 pp)
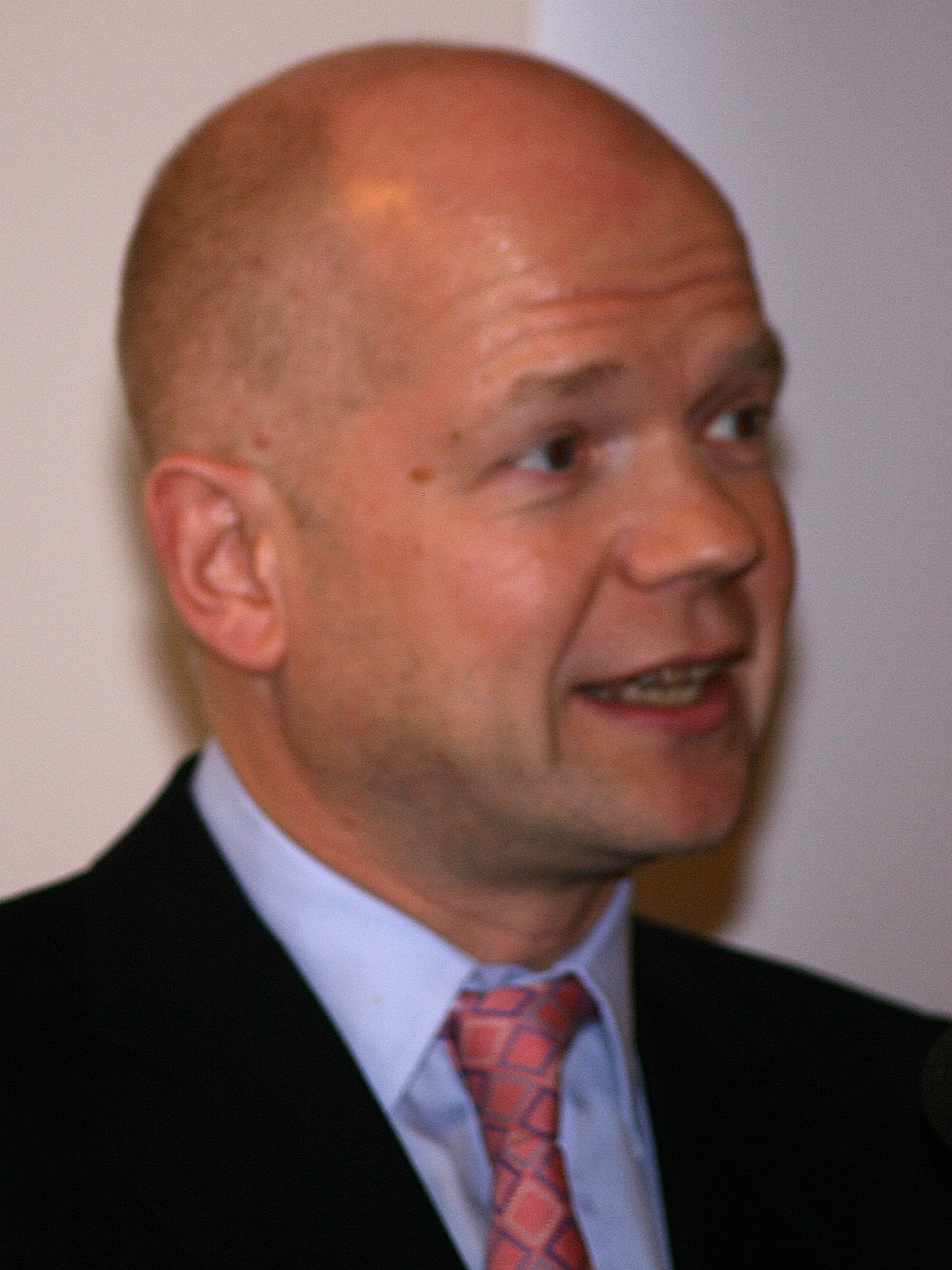
	First party	Second party	Third party
		SDP	SLD
Candidate	William Hague	Mike Potter	Barbara Pearce
Party	Conservative	SDP	SLD
Popular vote	19,543	16,909	11,589
Percentage	37.2%	32.2%	22.1%
Swing	▼24.0 pp	New party	▼4.9 pp
MP before election
Leon Brittan
Conservative
Subsequent MP
William Hague
Conservative

A by-election was held in the Richmond (Yorks) constituency of the United Kingdom Parliament on 23 February 1989. It followed the resignation of the sitting Conservative Member of Parliament (MP) Leon Brittan on 31 December 1988, to allow him to take up the position of Vice-President of the European Commission.

The Conservative Party retained the seat, with future party leader William Hague the winner. The result was affected in part to the decision by the remnants of the Social Democratic Party (the part that objected to the merger with the Liberal Party the previous year) to contest the election as well as the newly formed Social and Liberal Democrats (who subsequently renamed themselves the Liberal Democrats). The 'continuing' SDP candidate, local farmer Mike Potter, finished second (with 16,909 votes, 2,634 behind Hague), while the Social and Liberal Democrats' Barbara Pearce came third with 11,589.

The Labour Party achieved only fourth place in the election, at that time their worst position in any English by-election since World War II.

Hague retained the seat for the next 26 years, winning re-election at the 1992, 1997, 2001, 2005 and 2010 general elections. The Conservative Party would not win another by-election until Uxbridge, eight years later, after the Conservatives had left government, by which time Hague was party leader. The next occasion when they won a by-election in government was not until the 2014 Newark by-election, 25 years later.

== Result ==
Richmond by-election, 1989
Party	Candidate	Votes	%	±%
Conservative	William Hague	19,543	37.2	−24.0
SDP	Mike Potter	16,909	32.2	New
SLD	Barbara Pearce	11,589	22.1	−4.9
Labour	Frank Robson	2,591	4.9	−6.9
Green	Robert Upshall	1,473	2.8	New
Monster Raving Loony	David "Lord" Sutch	167	0.3	New
Independent	Anthony Millns	113	0.2	New
Corrective Party	Lindi St Clair	106	0.2	New
Liberal	Nicholas Watkins	70	0.1	New
Majority		2,634	5.0	−29.2
Turnout		52,561	64.4	−7.7
Conservative hold		Swing		

Anthony Millns was an independent candidate who used his occupation "University Information Officer" on the ballot paper. His campaign was focused on keeping the brewery company Theakstons within British ownership.

== See also ==
- List of United Kingdom by-elections
