= John Bathurst =

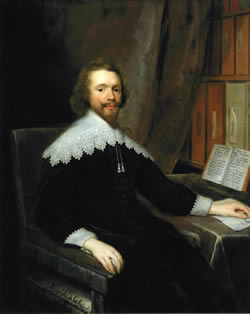
- Portrait of Bathurst
- Born: 1607; Sussex, England
- Died: 26 April 1659 (aged 51–52); England

John Bathurst (1607 – 26 April 1659) was an English physician and politician.

== Life ==
He was the second son of Dr. John Bathurst, of Goudhurst in Kent. He was born in Sussex, his mother being Dorothy, daughter of Captain E. Maplesden of Marsden, a naval officer. In December 1614 Bathurst entered the university of Cambridge as a sizar at Pembroke College, took the degree of B.A. in 1618, and that of M.A. in 1621. In 1637 he obtained the degree of M.D., and in the same year, on 22 December was admitted at once candidate and fellow of the College of Physicians, of which he was afterwards twice censor, in 1641 and 1650. On 1 February 1643 he was incorporated M.A. at Oxford.

In 1653, during the First Anglo-Dutch War, he was attending the seamen of the fleet after Robert Blake's prolonged engagement in February of that year. He represented Richmond, Yorkshire, as burgess in the parliament summoned by Cromwell in 1656, and again in Richard Cromwell's parliament in 1658. In July 1657 he was named elect of the College of Physicians in place of William Harvey. Bathurst was physician to Cromwell and to the family of Sir Richard Fanshawe. When Fanshawe, after his capture at the battle of Worcester, was kept a prisoner in London, he fell very sick from scurvy, and Bathurst interceded for him with Cromwell, who, on the strength of the doctor's medical certificate, obtained at the council chamber the order for Fanshawe's liberation, overruling objections of Sir Harry Vane.

He was charitable, and was said to have accumulated a fortune of £2,000 a year. Bathurst married Elizabeth, daughter and coheiress of Brian Willance, Esq., of Clints, Yorkshire, and had a numerous family. He died on 26 April 1659, aged 52.
