= Matthew Hutton (antiquary) =

English antiquarian

- Born: 1639
- Died: 1711 (aged 71–72)
- Occupation: Antiquarian

Matthew Hutton (1639–1711) was an English antiquarian.

== Biography ==
Hutton was born in 1639, the third son of Richard Hutton of Nether Poppleton, Yorkshire, by his second wife, Dorothy, daughter of Ferdinando, viscount Fairfax of Cameron in Scotland, and was thus the great-grandson of Matthew Hutton [q. v.], archbishop of York. He was educated at Brasenose College, Oxford, of which he was a fellow, and graduated M.A. and D.D. In March 1677 he became rector of Aynhoe in Northamptonshire (Bridge, Northamptonshire, i. 139). He married Elizabeth, daughter of Sir Roger Burgoine, knt. and bart., and had by her two sons, Roger and Thomas. He died suddenly on 27 June 1711, aged 72. His epitaph (Bridge, op. cit. i. 141), on the north side of the chancel of Aynhoe Church, describes him as 'Vita severus, moribus comis, animo simplex' (cf. Hearne, pref. to Leland's Coll.) Hutton was a friend of Anthony à Wood, who speaks of him as 'an excellent violinist.' In May 1668 they visited together the churches and antiquities in the neighbourhood of Borstall, Buckinghamshire. Hearne (Coll., ed. Doble, i. 283) says that Atterbury had most of his 'Rights and Privileges of an English Convocation Stated and Vindicated' from Hutton, who had also designed to continue the 'De Præsulibus Angliæ Commentarius' of Francis Godwin [q. v.] if he had had any encouragement (ib. pp. 284, 285, ii. 65, &c.) The manuscript collections compiled by Hutton, bought by the Earl of Oxford for 150l. (ib. iii. 280), and now in the British Museum, are:

Thirty-eight volumes, compiled about 1686, of extracts from the registers of the dioceses of Lincoln, Bath and Wells, York, London &c. (Harl MSS. 6950–85). 'Collectanea e libris Eschaetorum,’ &c. (ib. 1232). 'Collections from Domesday relating to Herefordshire, &c.' (ib. 7519). Heraldic collections, epitaphs, and other volumes of manuscripts. Hutton is not known to have published anything, though 'Three Letters concerning the Present State of Italy,’ 1687, has been attributed to him (C.H. and T. Cooper in Notes and Queries, 3rd ser. iv. 164).
