= John Wandesford (Kirklington MP, died 1664) =

17th-century English MP for Kirklington, Yorkshire

Member of House of Commons

Personal details
- Born: c. 1632
- Died: 2 December 1664 (age 34) London, England
- Education: Chester grammar school Richmond grammar school Christ’s College, Cambridge

John Wandesford (c. 1632–1664), of Kirklington, North Yorkshire was an English and politician who sat in the House of Commons during the mid-17th century. He represented Kirklington as a Member of Parliament and was active in local Yorkshire affairs during the Restoration period.

Wandesford was born circa 1632, the fourth son of Sir Christopher Wandesford and Alice (née Osborne) Wandesford. He attended Bedale grammar school, Chester grammar school, Richmond grammar school, and Christ’s College, Cambridge. He never married. He died in London on 2 December 1664.
