= Cuthbert Pepper =

English politician

Cuthbert Pepper (died 1608), of East Cowton, near Richmond, Yorkshire, was an English politician.

== Family ==
He was the son of Robert Pepper of East Cowton and married Margaret, daughter of Robert Wild of East Cowton.

== Career ==
He was admitted to Gray's Inn in 1570 and called to the bar in February 1578. He became recorder of Richmond in 1586 and served until 1603. He was a Member (MP) of the Parliament of England for Richmond, Yorkshire in 1597 and 1601. He was knighted at Whitehall in 1604, the year he became treasurer of Gray's Inn.
