= John Wandesford (Kirklington MP, died 1665) =

English politician

Member of the House of Commons

Personal details
- Born: 1593
- Died: 1665 (aged 71–72)
- Resting place: St Andrews, Holborn
- Relations: Christopher Wandesford (brother)
- Education: Cambridge University; Gray's Inn

John Wandesford (1593–1665) of Kirklington, Yorkshire was an English politician who sat in the House of Commons at various times between 1624 and 1665.

Wandesford was the second son of Sir George Wandesford of Kirklington and his wife Catherine Hansby of Beverley. He was the brother of Christopher Wandesford. He was educated at Cambridge University and admitted to study law at Gray's Inn on 28 February 1613.

In April 1624, Wandesford was elected Member of Parliament for Richmond, after which he was appointed consul in Aleppo. He was later elected to represent Hythe in the Short Parliament of 1640. A Royalist, he spent the Interregnum in exile in Paris, but after the Restoration of the Monarchy was finally elected again for Richmond, sitting in the Cavalier Parliament from 1662 until his death.

He died unmarried and was buried at St Andrews, Holborn on 21 January 1665.

Parliament of England
Vacant Parliament suspended since 1629	Member of Parliament for Hythe; 1640 (April); With: Sir Henry Heyman, 1st Baronet	Succeeded by Sir Henry Heyman, 1st Baronet; John Harvey
Preceded by John Yorke; Joseph Cradock	Member of Parliament for Richmond; 1662–1665; With: John Yorke 1662–64; William Killigrew 1664–65	Succeeded by William Killigrew; Marmaduke Darcy
