= Christopher Wandesford =

English administrator and politician

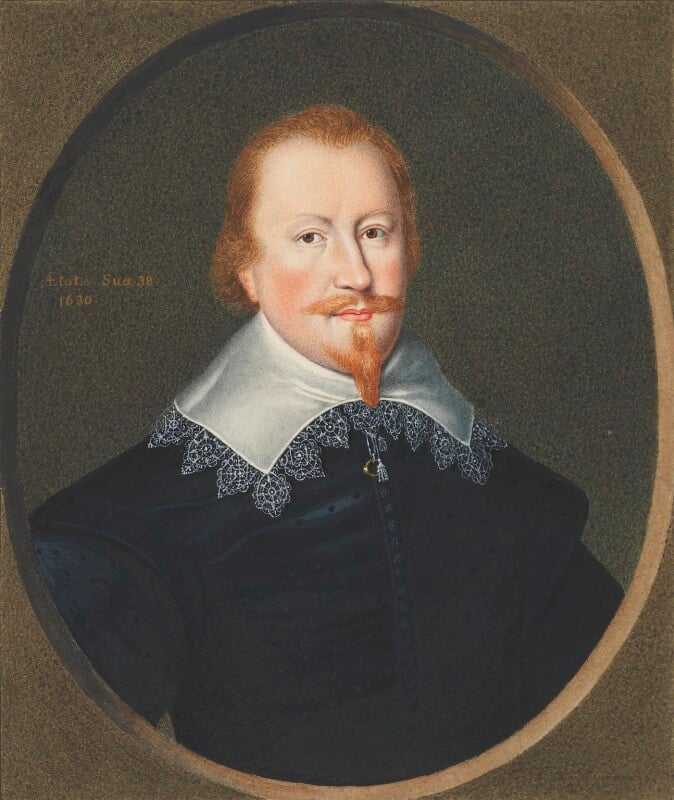
- Born: 24 September 1592; Bishop Burton
- Died: 3 December 1640 (aged 48)
- Education: Clare College, Cambridge; Gray's Inn
- Occupations: Politician, Lawyer
- Spouse: Alice Osbourne
- Children: 7, including Alice
- Parents: Sir George Wandesford; Catherine Hansby

Christopher Wandesford (24 September 1592 – 3 December 1640) was an English administrator and politician who sat in the House of Commons between 1621 and 1629. He was Lord Deputy of Ireland in the last months of his life.

== Life ==
Wandesford was born on 24 September 1592 at Bishop Burton, near Beverley, Yorkshire, the son of Sir George Wandesford (1573–1612) of Kirklington, Yorkshire and his wife Catherine Hansby, daughter of Ralph Hansby of Gray's Inn.

Educated at Clare College, Cambridge, and Gray's Inn, he entered Parliament as MP for Aldborough in 1621 and 1624. He was then returned for Richmond in 1625 and 1626 and Thirsk in 1628. His rise to importance was due primarily to his close friendship with Sir Thomas Wentworth, afterwards Earl of Strafford, who was his distant cousin. Although at first hostile to Charles I, as shown by the active part he took in the impeachment of George Villiers, 1st Duke of Buckingham, Wandesford soon became a royalist partisan, and in 1633 he accompanied Wentworth to Ireland, where he became Master of the Rolls. Wandesford said that he went to Ireland not out of ambition, but simply out of his affection for Wentworth. He sat in the Irish House of Commons as member for Kildare in the Irish Parliaments of 1634 and 1639 and was a member of the Privy Council of Ireland.

Wandesford's value to Wentworth was fully recognised by the latter, who wrote that of all the Privy Council he confided only in Wandesford and George Radcliffe, for whose services he could never be sufficiently thankful. In 1640 Wandesford succeeded Strafford as Lord Deputy of Ireland, but he had only just begun to struggle with the problems of his new position when he died, after a short illness which seems to have been a severe fever, on 3 December 1640. The medical treatment he received, which included applying split pigeons to the soles of his feet, is unlikely to have improved his chances of survival.

He had married Alice (1592–1659), the only daughter of Sir Hewett Osborne and his wife Joyce Fleetwood, and sister to Sir Edward Osborne, 1st Baronet, vice-president, under Wentworth, of the Council of the North. They had seven children, five of whom survived to adulthood. During the Irish Rebellion of 1641 his widow and children were forced to flee from their home and after some hardship returned safely to Yorkshire. In the general confusion, Wandesford's will disappeared and was not found until 1653: this led to bitter family disputes and years of litigation.

== Family ==
His son Christopher (1628–1687), made a baronet in 1662, was the father of Sir Christopher Wandesford, who was created an Irish peer as Viscount Castlecomer in 1707, Castlecomer in Kilkenny having been acquired by his grandfather when in Ireland. Christopher, the 2nd viscount, was Secretary-at-War in 1717–1718. In 1758 John, 5th viscount, was created Earl Wandesford, but his titles became extinct when he died in January 1784. Wandesford's younger daughter Alice Thornton (1626–1707) is still remembered for her Autobiography, first published in 1875, which is a valuable source for her father's life and career. Alice married William Thornton in 1651 and had three surviving children. Her elder sister Katherine (died 1645) married Sir Thomas Danby and had sixteen children, of whom ten survived infancy. There were two other surviving sons, John and George. George drowned accidentally near Richmond in 1651.

Defence was a priority for Christopher Wandesford, who built a castle in Castlecomer sometime between 1635 and 1640. He had been granted Castlecomer after he argued that the O'Brennans or Brennans who had been there since 1200 held the area without legal right. Because of this, he had to build a castle "to protect his steward and collieries from the wild Irish". Apparently he regretted this decision on his death bed and asked that half the rent for the entire area for the last 21 years be repaid to the O'Brennans. This was not done, despite the legal efforts of the clan. Finally in 1686 the Lord Chancellor of Ireland pronounced judgment in their favour, although it seems that this was not the end of the matter.

The Wandesford family were influential in Leinster, lending military aid to suppress the Irish rebellion of 1798 in Enniscorthy. A member of the family also married into the Butler family of Ormonde.

== Character ==
Strafford's biographer, C. V. Wedgwood, describes Wandesford as shy, self-effacing, tolerant and charitable, a profound thinker, a fine lawyer and a man who was deeply concerned for social justice. Even though public opinion in Ireland had turned against Strafford's associates in his final months, Wandesford's death was genuinely mourned there.

== Notes ==
Parliament of England
Preceded by Sir Henry Savile; George Wetherid	Member of Parliament for Aldborough; 1621–1624; With: John Carvile	Succeeded by Richard Aldborough; John Carvile
Preceded by John Wandesford; Christopher Pepper	Member of Parliament for Richmond; 1625–1626; With: Sir Talbot Bowes 1625; Matthew Hutton 1626	Succeeded by Sir Talbot Bowes; James Howell
Preceded by Henry Belasyse; William Cholmeley	Member of Parliament for Thirsk; 1628–1629; With: William Frankland	Parliament suspended until 1640
