= Talbot Bowes =

English politician

Sir Talbot Bowes (1560 – 14 February 1638) was an English politician who sat in the House of Commons at various times between 1593 and 1629.

Bowes was the son of Sir George Bowes and his second wife and was baptised on 25 November 1560. He was admitted at Gray's Inn in 1579. In 1593, he was elected Member of Parliament for Richmond. He was commissioner for musters for North Riding of Yorkshire in 1585 and commissioner for recusancy in 1596. He was alderman (mayor) of Richmond from 1598 to 1599. In 1601 he was elected MP for Richmond again. He was re-elected MP for Richmond in 1604. In 1611 he succeeded his half-brother Sir William Bowes to the estates of Barnard Castle. He was re-elected MP for Richmond in 1614. He was knighted in 1617. In 1621 he was re-elected MP for Richmond. He was alderman of Richmond again from 1624 to 1625. In 1625 he was re-elected MP for Richmond. He was last elected MP for Richmond in 1628 and sat until 1629 when King Charles decided to rule without parliament for eleven years.

Bowes died at the age of 77 and was buried at Barnard Castle.

Bowes married Agnes Warcop, daughter of Thomas Warcop of Smardale, Westmorland. He was half brother to Sir William Bowes and Robert Bowes.

Parliament of England
Preceded by James Dale; John Smythe	Member of Parliament for Richmond; 1593; With: John Pepper	Succeeded by Marmaduke Wyvill; Cuthbert Pepper
Preceded by Marmaduke Wyvill; Cuthbert Pepper	Member of Parliament for Richmond; 1601–1622; With: Cuthbert Pepper 1601; Richard Perceval 1604–1611; Sir William Richardson 1614; William Bowes 1621–1622	Succeeded by Christopher Wandesford; Christopher Pepper
Preceded by Thomas Wandesford; Christopher Pepper	Member of Parliament for Richmond; 1625; With: Christopher Wandesford	Succeeded by Christopher Wandesford; Matthew Hutton
Preceded by Christopher Wandesford; Matthew Hutton	Member of Parliament for Richmond; 1628–1629; With: James Howell 1628–1629	Parliament suspended until 1640
