= Francis Thorpe =

English barrister, judge and politician

Francis Thorpe (1595–1665) was an English barrister, judge and politician.

== Early life ==
He was the eldest son of Roger Thorpe of Birdsall, North Yorkshire and of his wife Elizabeth, daughter of William Danyell of Beswick. He was admitted a student of Gray's Inn on 12 February 1611, and of St John's College, Cambridge, on 8 November following. He graduated B.A. in 1613.

Thorpe was called to the bar on 11 May 1621, was ancient of Gray's Inn in 1632, bencher in 1640, and autumn reader in 1641. He was made recorder of Beverley in 1623, and held the post until raised to the bench in 1649, when he was succeeded by his stepson, William Wise. He was recorder of Kingston upon Hull from 1639 till 1648, and made the public speech at the reception of Charles I on his visit to the town in April 1639.

== The Civil War ==
On 24 March 1641 Thorpe was called as a witness at the trial of the Earl of Strafford. On the outbreaking of the First English Civil War, Thorpe took the side of Parliament, serving in its army and attaining the rank of colonel. He represented the borough of Richmond (Yorks) as a "recruiter" to the Long Parliament (elected 20 October 1645). On 6 September 1648 he was appointed by the committee for the advance of money steward for the sequestered estates of the Duke of Buckingham in Yorkshire. On 12 October of the same year he was made serjeant-at-law by the parliament.

== Interregnum ==
Thorpe was named a commissioner for the trial of King Charles I in January 1649, but never attended the court. On 14 April he received the thanks of the house for his services to the Commonwealth on his last circuit, and was ordered on 15 June to go on the same again the following vacation. On 1 June 1649 he was raised to a seat in the exchequer. On 1 April 1650 he was appointed one of the commissioners for the act for establishing the high court of justice.

By 1650 Thorpe was assessed by royalists as paying lip-service only to Oliver Cromwell. In March 1652 he was busy accommodating the differences among the assessment commissioners of Yorkshire. On 12 July of the same year he was elected to represent Beverley in the First Protectorate Parliament, and in November was one of the judges for the western circuit.

In March 1655 Thorpe was again on the western circuit, and on 3 April he received a special commission for the trial of those apprehended in the recent insurrection in the west. These he tried, and was immediately summoned by Cromwell to consult on proceedings against insurgents in the north. Thorpe and Sir Richard Newdigate raised objection to dispensing with the usual lapse of fifteen days before proceeding with a newly issued commission, and they expressed doubt as to whether the offence with which the prisoners were charged could legally be declared to be treason. The consequent delay on the part of the judges in proceeding in the matter was interpreted as a refusal to serve, and writs of ease were issued to both Thorpe and Newdigate on 3 May.

Thorpe's disgrace at court increased his popularity in the north, and he was elected to represent Yorkshire in the parliament of September 1656. He was, however, one of those excluded from sitting by the refusal of the Protector to grant his certificate of approbation. He signed the remonstrance to the council of the ninety excluded members (22 September 1656). At the opening of the second session (26 January 1658) he took his oath and his seat, which he retained till the dissolution on 4 February.

Thorpe was by this time an opponent of Cromwell. He did not serve in Richard Cromwell's parliament of January 1659, and in June of that year was again on circuit. On 17 January 1660 he was replaced on the bench as baron of the exchequer, and went on the northern circuit for the last time during Lent assizes.

== Under Charles II ==
At the Restoration of 1660, Thorpe petitioned for a special pardon. He pleaded his opposition to the king's death and his refusal to try the royalists of the Yorkshire rising. On 13 June, during the debate on the act of indemnity, Thorpe was named as one of those to be excluded. As receiver of money in Yorkshire he had been accused of detaining £25,000. William Prynne, speaking during the debate, compared his case with that of judge William de Thorpe, who in 1350 was sentenced to death for receiving bribes, and asked that Thorpe should be treated likewise. He was, however, included in the act of indemnity.

Thorpe died at his residence, Bardsey Grange, near Leeds, and was buried at Bardsey church on 7 June 1665.

== Works ==
Thorp's Charge delivered at York on 20 March was published both in York and London in 1649; and was reprinted in vol. ii. of the Harleian Miscellany (edits. 1744 and 1808). It is a work of apologetics, justifying the king's execution and vindicating the proceedings of parliament by quotations from the works of republican writers. A speech by Thorpe about the Other House, delivered in the House of Commons on 4 February 1658, was printed in Thomas Burton's Diary (ii. 445) edited by John Towill Rutt.

== Family ==
Thorpe married Elizabeth, daughter of William Oglethorpe of Rawden, and widow of Thomas Wise and of Francis Denton. She survived him, her last husband, till 1 August 1666, and was buried at Bardsey, where her son, William Wise of Beverley, erected a monument to her memory.

== Notes ==
Attribution

This article incorporates text from a publication now in the public domain: Lee, Sidney, ed. (1898). "Thorpe, Francis". Dictionary of National Biography. Vol. 56. London: Smith, Elder & Co.
