= Robert Bowes (died 1600) =

English politician

Robert Bowes (c. 1553–1600) was an English politician.

He was a member (MP) of the parliament of England for Thirsk in 1584 and for Richmond, Yorkshire in 1586.
