= Samuel Coxe =

16th-century English politician

Samuel Coxe (Mar. 1550–1612), of London; later of Fulbrook, Oxfordshire, was an English politician.

He was a Member (MP) of the Parliament of England for Rochester in 1572 and for Richmond, Yorkshire in 1586.
