= Thomas Chaloner (regicide) =

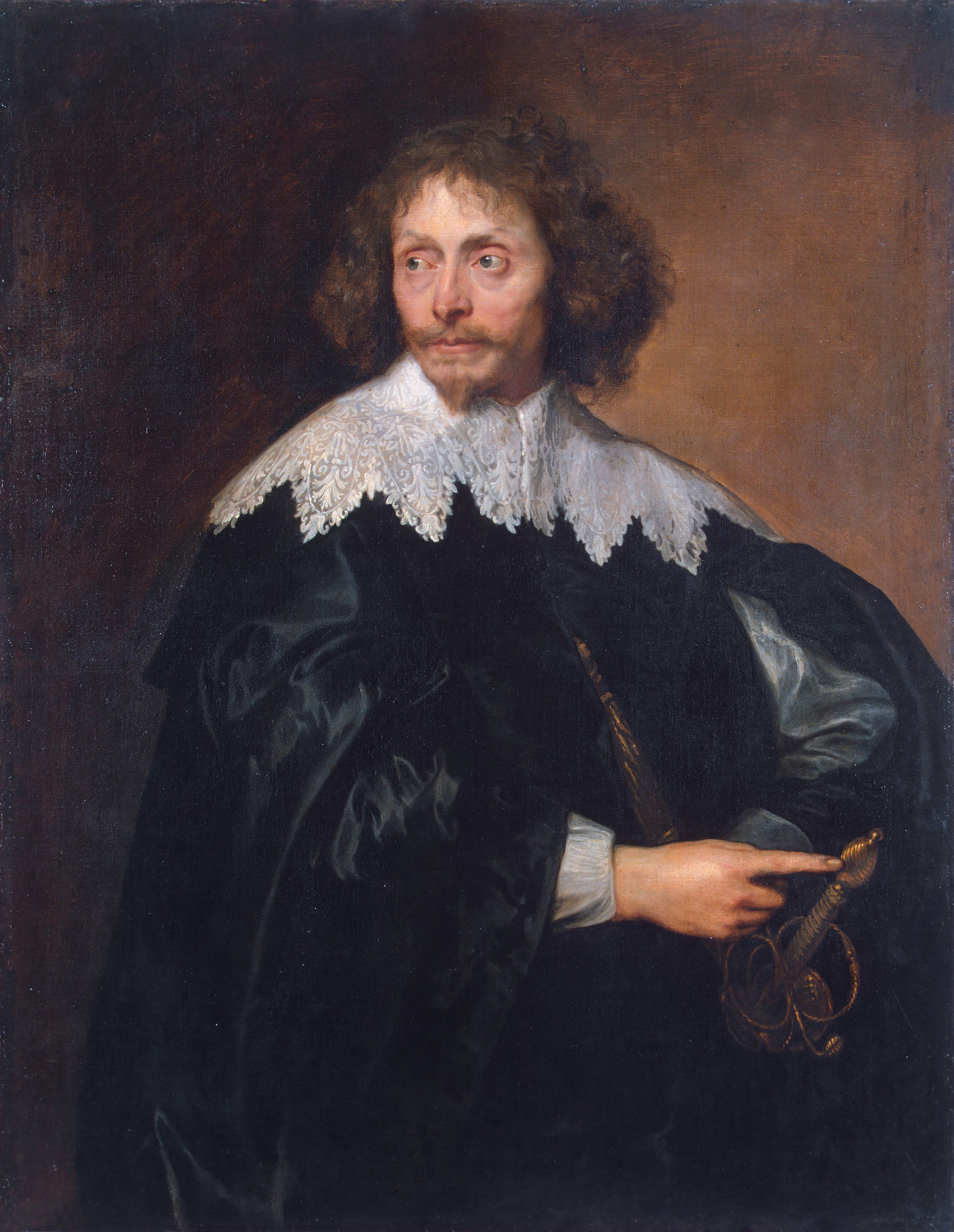
Chaloner painted by Anthony van Dyck, 1637

Thomas Chaloner (1595–1661) was an English politician, commissioner at the trial of Charles I and signatory to his death warrant.

He was born at Steeple Claydon, Buckinghamshire, and was the son of the courtier Sir Thomas Chaloner.

In January 1649, he and his younger brother, James Chaloner (1602–1660), served as two of the 135 commissioners of the court that tried King Charles I. Subsequently, Thomas signed the King's death warrant, whilst James did not.

In 1660, at the restoration of the monarchy under Charles II, Chaloner was excluded from the Indemnity and Oblivion Act, which gave a general pardon, and escaped to the Continent to avoid a trial for high treason. He died at Middelburg in the Netherlands in 1661.
