= Joseph Cradock =

English writer (1742–1826)

Joseph Cradock FSA
- Born: 9 January 1741/2; Leicester, Leicestershire
- Died: 15 December 1826 (aged 84); The Strand, London
- Education: Leicester Grammar School; Emmanuel College, Cambridge
- Spouse: Anna Francesca Stratford (m. 1765; died 1815)

Joseph Cradock, FSA (1741/2 – 1826) was an English man of letters, writer, bibliophile and amateur actor.

== Biography ==
=== Early life ===
Joseph was born at Leicester on 9 January 1741/2, the only surviving son of Joseph Cradock of Leicester and Gumley. He was inoculated against smallpox in spite of the prevailing prejudice. His father was threatened by the mob, and had to pay the surgeon 100l. His mother died in 1749, and his father afterwards married Anne Ludlam (died 1774), sister of two well-known mathematicians. Cradock was educated at Leicester Grammar School. His father died in 1759, and he was soon afterwards sent to Emmanuel College, Cambridge, of which Richard Farmer, his schoolfellow, was then tutor. He had already acquired a taste for the stage and for London society, and left Cambridge without daring to face the examination for a degree.

=== London ===
In 1765 Cradock married Anna Francesca, third daughter of Francis Stratford of Merivale Hall, Warwickshire. During his honeymoon the Duke of Newcastle, as Chancellor of Cambridge, conferred upon him the MA degree. He took a house in the fashionable quarter, Dean Street, Soho; became known to the London wits, and an enthusiastic playgoer. In 1766 Farmer dedicated to him the well-known Essay on the Learning of Shakespeare. Cradock soon afterwards settled at a mansion which he had built at Gumley, and upon a scale which led to embarrassment. He was High Sheriff of Leicestershire in 1766 and 1781. In 1768 he was elected FSA. He gave private theatricals at Gumley, where David Garrick offered to play the Ghost to his Hamlet, and in 1769 took a conspicuous part at the Stratford jubilee of Shakespeare's death. He collected a fine library and amused himself with landscape gardening. A little book called Village Memoirs (1774) gives his views upon this subject, and upon religion and life in general. His musical skill procured him a welcome at Lord Sandwich's seat at Hinchinbroke, where Miss Ray sang in oratorios, while Lord Sandwich performed on the kettledrum. He was a patron of the music meetings at Leicester, originated in 1771 for the benefit of the infirmary. There was a great performance in 1774, when an ode written by Cradock, set to music by Boyce, was performed, and among the audience were Lord Sandwich and Omai, the native of Otaheite. In 1771 a tragedy by Cradock, called Zobeide, founded on Voltaire's Les Scythes, was performed at Covent Garden with success. Voltaire acknowledged the work in a note dated Ferney, 9 October 1773, in which he says:

Thanks to your muse, a foreign copper shines,

Turned into gold and coined in sterling lines.

In 1773 he wrote a pamphlet called The Life of John Wilkes, Esq., in the manner of Plutarch, a Wilkite mob having broken his windows in Dean Street. In 1777 he published An Account of some of the most Romantic Parts of North Wales, having ascended Snowdon in 1774.

=== Later life ===
From 1783 to 1786 Cradock travelled through France and Holland, his wife's health having failed. After his return his own health compelled him to withdraw from society, though he took part in various local movements. In 1815 he published Four Dissertations, Moral and Religious. His wife died on 25 December 1816. In his later years he was very intimate with John Nichols, the antiquary. In 1821 he published a little novel against gambling, called Fidelia. In 1823 growing embarrassments induced him to sell his estate and library and retire to London on a small annuity. In 1824 he published his tragedy, The Czar, which had got as far as a rehearsal fifty years before. Its reception was good enough to induce him to publish in 1826 his Literary and Miscellaneous Memoirs, followed by a second volume including his travels. He died in the Strand on 15 December 1826. He is described as being "a sort of twin brother" of Garrick, both in mind and body. He had a talent for acting, and was a lively, cultivated, and volatile person. His friend, George Dyer, spoke favourably of the generosity of his feelings, and added that he was strictly temperate, living chiefly on very small quantities of turnips, roasted apples, and coffee, and never drinking wine. He was "cupped sometimes twice a day"; yet he lived to be eighty-four.

== Bibliography ==
- Stephen, Leslie (1887). "Cradock, Joseph" . In Stephen, Leslie (ed.). Dictionary of National Biography. Vol. 12. London: Smith, Elder & Co. pp. 435–436.
