= Order of precedence in the British Army =

Parade order of British Army units

The British Army is listed according to an order of precedence for the purposes of parading. This is the order in which the various corps of the army parade, from right to left, with the unit at the extreme right being highest. Under ordinary circumstances, the Household Cavalry parades at the extreme right of the line. Militia and Army Reserve units take precedence after Regular units with the exception of The Honourable Artillery Company and The Royal Monmouthshire Royal Engineers.

== Order of precedence ==
In the British Army's Order of Precedence, the Household Cavalry is always listed first and parades at the extreme right of the line. However, when the Royal Horse Artillery is on parade with its guns it takes precedence.

- Household Cavalry
- Royal Horse Artillery
- Royal Armoured Corps
- Royal Regiment of Artillery
- Corps of Royal Engineers
- Royal Corps of Signals
- Infantry
  - Foot Guards
  - Line Infantry
  - Rifles
- Special Air Service
- Army Air Corps
- Special Reconnaissance Regiment
- Royal Army Chaplains' Department
- Royal Logistic Corps
- Royal Army Medical Service
- Royal Electrical and Mechanical Engineers
- Adjutant General's Corps
- Royal Army Veterinary Corps
- Small Arms School Corps
- Intelligence Corps
- Royal Army Physical Training Corps
- General Service Corps
- Royal Corps of Army Music
- Royal Monmouthshire Royal Engineers (Militia) (Army Reserve)
- Honourable Artillery Company (Although Army Reserve Regiments, they are included in the order of arms Regular Army)
- Remainder of the Army Reserve
- Royal Gibraltar Regiment
- Royal Bermuda Regiment

== Household Cavalry, Royal Armoured Corps and Infantry orders of precedence ==
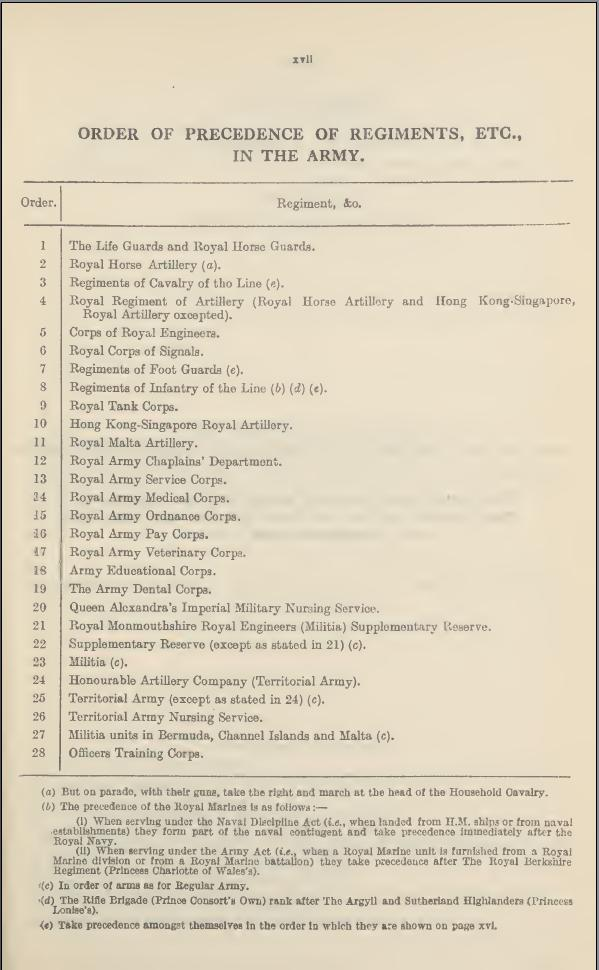
1937 Order

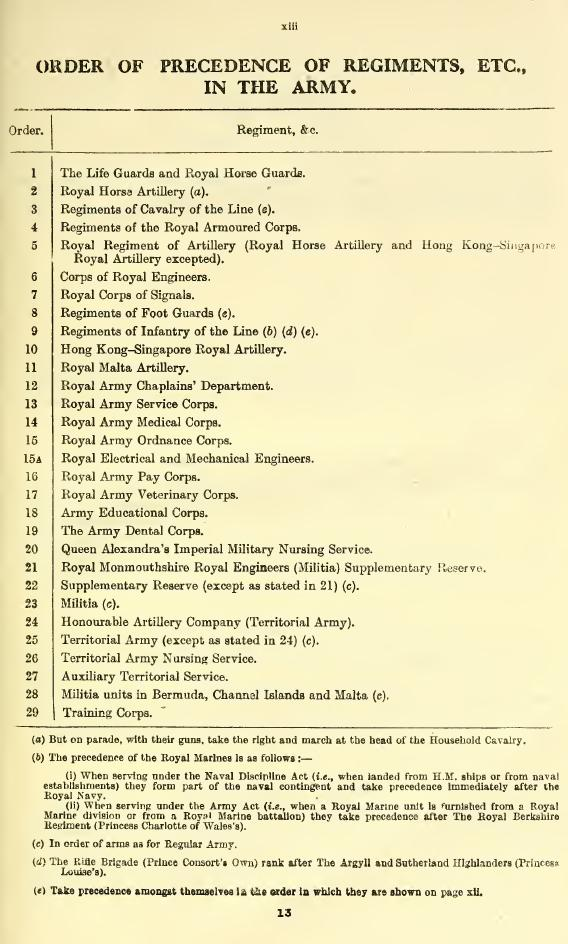
1945 Order

Cavalry, tank and infantry regiments of the British Army are listed in their own orders of precedence, which dates back to when regiments had numbers rather than names. The order comes from the start of the regiment's service under the Crown, up to 1881 and the "Cardwell Reforms", when the use of numbers was abolished in favour of linking with and using county names. The regiments of the Household Division are always listed first, as they are the most senior, followed by the line regiments. In today's army, which has many regiments formed through amalgamations of other regiments, the rank in the order of precedence is that of the more senior of the amalgamated units. It is for this reason that the Princess of Wales's Royal Regiment, one of the youngest in the army, is ranked second in the line infantry order – it is the direct descendant of the 2nd Regiment of Foot.

=== Cavalry and RTR order of precedence ===
The majority of line cavalry regiments in the British Army now form part of a wider administrative formation called the Royal Armoured Corps, along with the Royal Tank Regiment. The two cavalry guards regiments are part of a separate administrative formation called the Household Cavalry.

Modern regiment	Formation	Antecedent regiments
Household Cavalry (Note: The 1st Life Guards, 2nd Life Guards and the Royal Horse Guards, were originally termed Horse Guards and given precedence over the Cavalry regiments of the Line. The 1st Royal Dragoons was a line regiment.)
Life Guards	1922	1st Life Guards, 2nd Life Guards
Blues and Royals (Royal Horse Guards and 1st Dragoons)	1969	Royal Horse Guards, 1st Dragoons
Royal Armoured Corps
Dragoon Guards (Note: In the sequence for Cavalry of the Line, Cavalry, consisting of Dragoon Guards, come first in the order of precedence with their own numbering sequence. Light Cavalry, consisting of Dragoons, Hussars and Lancers, have their own (single) sequence, hence 1st Dragoons, 3rd Hussars, 5th Lancers, 6th Dragoons, 8th Hussars, 9th Lancers, etc.)
1st The Queen's Dragoon Guards	1959	1st Dragoon Guards, 2nd Dragoon Guards
Royal Scots Dragoon Guards (Carabiniers and Greys)	1971	3rd Dragoon Guards, 6th Dragoon Guards, 2nd Dragoons
Royal Dragoon Guards	1992	4th Dragoon Guards, 5th Dragoon Guards, 7th Dragoon Guards, 6th Dragoons
Light cavalry
Queen's Royal Hussars (The Queen's Own and Royal Irish)	1993	3rd Hussars, 4th Hussars, 7th Hussars, 8th Hussars
Royal Lancers (Queen Elizabeth's Own) (Note: Although one of the antecedent regiments of the Royal Lancers was the 5th Lancers, this regiment was formed in the 1850s, resurrecting the number of an old regiment and thus ranked in precedence after the 17th Lancers.)	2015	9th Lancers, 12th Lancers, 16th Lancers, 17th Lancers, 5th Lancers, 21st Lancers
King's Royal Hussars	1992	10th Hussars, 11th Hussars, 14th Hussars, 20th Hussars
Light Dragoons	1992	13th Hussars, 15th Hussars, 18th Hussars, 19th Hussars
Royal Tank Regiment (Note: The RTR (which was formed during the First World War) takes final place in the RAC order.)
Royal Tank Regiment	2014	1st, 2nd, 3rd, 4th, 5th, 6th, 7th, 8th Royal Tank Regiments

=== Infantry order of precedence ===
The infantry is ranked in the order of foot guards, line infantry, (Note: The infantry order of precedence has several missing numbers, due to infantry regiments being disbanded: Royal Irish Regiment (disbanded 1922) – 18th Regt of Foot; Cameronians (Scottish Rifles) (suspended animation 1968; disbanded 1987) – 26th, 90th Regts of Foot; York and Lancaster Regiment (suspended animation 1968; disbanded 1987) – 65th, 84th Regts of Foot; Connaught Rangers (disbanded 1922) – 88th, 94th Regts of Foot; Prince of Wales's Leinster Regiment (Royal Canadians) (disbanded 1922) – 100th, 109th Regts of Foot; Royal Munster Fusiliers (disbanded 1922) – 101st, 104th Regts of Foot; Royal Dublin Fusiliers (disbanded 1922) – 102nd, 103rd Regts of Foot) Rifles. The Royal Marines, as the descendant of the old Army marine regiments of the 17th and 18th centuries, were included in the Order of Precedence after the descendant of the 49th Foot (the Royal Gloucestershire, Berkshire and Wiltshire Light Infantry (RGBWLI)), which was the last line regiment of foot formed prior to the formation of the Royal Marines, when not on parade with the Royal Navy. On the completion of the infantry reorganisation in 2007, the RGBWLI, along with the Devonshire and Dorset Light Infantry, the Light Infantry and the Royal Green Jackets, were absorbed into what has become part of The Rifles, and moved last in the Order of Precedence. Then, in April 2008, new guidance stated that, rather than being considered a separate arm of the Royal Navy, the Royal Marines became an integral part of it, and would therefore parade as part of the Royal Navy, even if they were the only representatives present. As a result, the Royal Marines now always parade to the right of the line, after any contingent of the Royal Navy, but always before the Army.

Modern regiment	Formation	Antecedent regiments
Foot guards (Note: Although the Grenadier Guards traces its formation to a date after both the Coldstream Guards and Scots Guards, it stands as the senior foot guards regiment by virtue of being on the English establishment in the service of the Crown for the longest. The Coldstream Guards formed part of the New Model Army until 1661, while the Scots Guards became part of the English Army in 1686.) (Note: A sixth regiment of foot guards, the Guards Machine Gun Regiment, existed between 1918 and 1920, and was formed through the regimentation of the foot guards' machine gun companies, and the conversion of the three regiments of Household Cavalry. The Guards Machine Gun Regiment was ranked as the sixth regiment of foot guards, placing it behind the other foot guards regiments, but ahead of all regiments of line infantry and rifles.)
Grenadier Guards	1656	Royal Regt of Guards, King's Royal Regt of Guards
Coldstream Guards	1650	
Scots Guards	1642	Marquis of Argyll's Royal Regiment
Irish Guards	1900	
Welsh Guards	1915	
Line infantry (Note: Up to 2006, five line infantry regiments had never been amalgamated in their entire history. In 2006 and 2007, these were amalgamated into large regiments under the planned reorganisation of the infantry: Royal Scots (The Royal Regiment) – 1st Regt of Foot (now part of the Royal Regiment of Scotland); Green Howards (Alexandra, Princess of Wales's Own Yorkshire Regiment) – 19th Regt of Foot (now part of the Royal Yorkshire Regiment); 22nd (Cheshire) Regiment – 22nd Regt of Foot (now part of Mercian Regiment); Royal Welch Fusiliers – 23rd Regt of Foot (now part of the Royal Welsh); King's Own Scottish Borderers – 25th Regt of Foot (now part of the Royal Regiment of Scotland))
Royal Regiment of Scotland	2006	1st, 21st, 25th, 42nd, 71st, 72nd, 73rd, 74th, 75th, 78th, 79th, 91st, 92nd, 93rd Regts of Foot
Princess of Wales's Royal Regiment (Queen's and Royal Hampshires)	1992	2nd, 3rd, 31st, 35th, 37th, 50th, 57th, 67th, 70th, 77th, 97th, 107th Regts of Foot
Duke of Lancaster's Regiment (King's, Lancashire and Border)	2006	4th, 8th, 30th, 34th, 40th, 47th, 55th, 59th, 63rd, 81st, 82nd, 96th Regts of Foot
Royal Regiment of Fusiliers	1968	5th, 6th, 7th, 20th Regts of Foot
Royal Anglian Regiment	1964	9th, 10th, 12th, 16th, 17th, 44th, 48th, 56th, 58th Regts of Foot
Royal Yorkshire Regiment (14th/15th, 19th and 33rd/76th Foot)	2006	14th, 15th, 19th, 33rd, 76th Regts of Foot
Mercian Regiment (Cheshire, Worcesters and Foresters, and Staffords)	2007	22nd, 29th, 36th, 38th, 45th, 64th, 80th, 95th, 98th Regts of Foot
Royal Welsh	2006	23rd, 24th, 41st, 69th Regts of Foot
Royal Irish Regiment (27th (Inniskilling) 83rd and 87th and Ulster Defence Regiment)	1992	27th, 83rd, 86th, 87th, 89th, 108th Regts of Foot, Ulster Defence Regiment
Parachute Regiment	1942	Army Commandos
Royal Gurkha Rifles	1994	2nd, 6th, 7th, 10th Gurkha Rifles
The Rifles (Note: Although The Rifles is descended from many numbered regiments, it is last in the order of precedence because the unnumbered regiment The Rifle Brigade has served longest as a rifle regiment. The Royal Gurkha Rifles comes before The Rifles because one of its predecessors (the 2nd Gurkha Rifles) entered service before the Rifle Brigade ceased using its old number (95th). As both the Royal Gurkha Rifles and The Rifles are rifle regiments they come last in the order of precedence; thus the Parachute Regiment, which is classed as a line infantry regiment, comes before both.)	2007	11th, 13th, 28th, 32nd, 39th, 43rd, 46th, 49th, 51st, 52nd, 53rd, 54th, 60th, 61st, 62nd, 66th, 68th, 85th, 99th, 105th, 106th Regts of Foot, The Rifle Brigade
Ranger Regiment (Note: The Ranger Regiment was formed through the renaming of four individual battalions from different regiments: 1st Battalion - ex-1 SCOTS: This was formed through the amalgamation of the Royal Scots (1st Foot) and the King's Own Scottish Borderers (25th Foot); 2nd Battalion - ex-2 PWRR: This was one of two battalions formed when the three battalions of the Queen's Regiment amalgamated with the single battalion of the Royal Hampshire Regiment to form the Princess of Wales's Royal Regiment (Queen's and Royal Hampshires); 3rd Battalion - ex-2 LANCS: This was formed through the renaming of the King's Regiment, itself formed through the amalgamation of the King's Regiment (Liverpool) (8th Foot) and the Manchester Regiment (63rd Foot and 96th Foot); 4th Battalion - ex 4 RIFLES: This was formed through the renaming of the 2nd Battalion, Royal Green Jackets, which had previously been the King's Royal Rifle Corps (60th Foot))	2021	Was formed from various disbanded battalions, not by regimental amalgamation, and thus has no antecedent regiments

== Precedence within the Army Reserve ==
1. Royal Monmouthshire Royal Engineers (Militia)
2. Honourable Artillery Company
3. Royal Armoured Corps
  - Royal Yeomanry
  - Royal Wessex Yeomanry
  - Queen's Own Yeomanry
  - Scottish and North Irish Yeomanry
4. Royal Regiment of Artillery
5. Corps of Royal Engineers
6. Royal Corps of Signals
7. Infantry (Note: In 2022, the London Regiment was dissolved and its personnel transferred to reserve companies of foot guards regiments which were administratively grouped as 1st Battalion, London Guards. thus it was removed from the order of precedence.)
  - 52nd Lowland, 6th Battalion Royal Regiment of Scotland
  - 51st Highland, 7th Battalion Royal Regiment of Scotland
  - 3rd Battalion, Princess of Wales's Royal Regiment (Queen's and Royal Hampshires)
  - 4th Battalion, Princess of Wales's Royal Regiment (Queen's and Royal Hampshires)
  - 4th Battalion, Duke of Lancaster's Regiment (King's, Lancashire and Border)
  - 5th Battalion, Royal Regiment of Fusiliers
  - 3rd Battalion, Royal Anglian Regiment
  - 4th Battalion, Royal Yorkshire Regiment (14th/15th, 19th & 33rd/76th Foot)
  - 4th Battalion, Mercian Regiment (Cheshires, Worcesters & Foresters, and Staffords)
  - 3rd Battalion, Royal Welsh
  - 2nd Battalion, Royal Irish Regiment (27th (Inniskilling), 83rd, 87th & Ulster Defence Regiment)
  - 4th Battalion, Parachute Regiment
  - 6th Battalion, The Rifles
  - 7th Battalion, The Rifles
  - 8th Battalion, The Rifles
8. Special Air Service
  - 21st Special Air Service Regiment (Artists)
  - 23rd Special Air Service Regiment
9. Army Air Corps
10. Royal Logistic Corps
11. Royal Army Medical Service
12. Corps of Royal Electrical and Mechanical Engineers
13. Adjutant General's Corps
14. Intelligence Corps

== Precedence of the UK Auxiliary Forces ==
Reserve Forces (generally known, after the 1859 creation and re-organisation under the Reserve Force Act 1867 of the Regular Reserve of the British Army, as Local Forces or Auxiliary Forces), including the Militia (or Constitutional Force), Yeomanry, Volunteer Force, and Fencibles, were not originally considered parts of the British Army (which, prior to the 1855 abolishment of the Board of Ordnance was not the only Regular Force, being composed primarily of cavalry and infantry units while the Royal Artillery, Royal Engineers, and Royal Sappers and Miners belonged to the Board of Ordnance and were known collectively as the Ordnance Military Corps in distinction to the board's civilian Commissariat, ordnance stores, transport and other departments).

During the latter 19th century and early 20th century, the auxiliary forces (each of which had its own order or precedence: Yeomanry order-of-precedence; Militia order-of-precedence; Volunteer Force order-of-precedence) in the UK were increasingly integrated with British Army units, while maintaining separate force hierarchies. In the process, they were removed from the control of the lords-lieutenant of counties and administered directly by the War Office. The only point of distinction between a British Army unit and an auxiliary, whether in the UK-proper or a colony, was whether or not it was wholly or partly funded by the War Office (from Army funds). As Militia Tax and other funds were replaced for UK auxiliary units, they were added to the British Army order of precedence.

Although most auxiliary units had in 1881 (after the Cardwell and Childers Reforms) become companies or battalions of regular army corps or regiments, they were not grouped with their regular companies or battalions in the British Army order of precedence. Instead, each entire force was added separately to the order of precedence of the British Army, with its respective units retaining their original orders of precedence within that (where the force contained units of more than one corps, they were grouped and took precedence also in accordance with their parent corps of the regular army; eg., Militia Artillery units took precedence ahead of Militia Infantry, with Militia Artillery units having their own internal order of precedence, starting with the Antrim Artillery Militia, numbered 1st, whereas for the Militia Infantry of England and Wales the 3rd West York (Light Infantry) numbered 1st (in 1855), and was also titled the First Regiment of Militia.

The most senior Volunteer Force artillery corps was the 1st Northumberland Artillery Volunteer Corps formed on 2 August, 1859. The Exeter and South Devon Volunteers numbered first in the order of precedence of the Volunteer Infantry. The senior Yeomanry unit, numbering 1st, was the Royal Wiltshire Yeomanry. None of these were to be confused with, by example, the 1st Foot Guards (Grenadier Guards), 1st Regiment of Foot of the British Army (Royal Scots)). The Yeomanry, as cavalry, took precedence over the Militia, despite being far younger. The older Militia took precedence over the younger Volunteer Force. In 1908, the auxiliary forces in the UK were reorganised, with the Yeomanry and Volunteer Force becoming the Territorial Force (in 1921 renamed the Territorial Army), and the Militia becoming the Special Reserve (which was allowed to lapse after 1921).

The Territorial Army remained nominally a separate force from the British Army until renamed under the Defence Reform Act 2014 as the Army Reserve. Its units remain grouped together separately in the British Army order of precedence from their regular army companies and battalions as 26th in order of precedence.

== Precedence of the Colonial and Crown Dominion units ==
Not all colonial and Crown Dominion regular or reserve units had been considered part of the British Army and placed on the order of precedence (although those of the Channel Islands and the Imperial fortress colonies generally were), and Imperial reserve units did not follow the same process of re-organisation and consolidation as the UK ones. Originally, the part-time reserve units in Bermuda, the Channel Islands and Malta had (in 1945) numbered collectively as 28th in order of precedence, but were ordered within that according to the order of their parent corps in the regular army. This meant, by example, that the Bermuda Militia Artillery (BMA), raised in 1895, as part of the Royal Regiment of Artillery, preceded the Bermuda Volunteer Rifle Corps (BVRC), raised in 1894. Today, the Royal Bermuda Regiment, an amalgam of the BMA and BVRC, is ordered 28th.

1. (27th) Royal Gibraltar Regiment (As a Colonial Force the Royal Gibraltar Regiment comes after the Army Reserve)
2. (28th) Royal Bermuda Regiment
