= 56th Regiment of Foot (disambiguation) =

56th Regiment of Foot may refer to:

- 54th (West Norfolk) Regiment of Foot, 56th Regiment of Foot, raised in 1755 and renumbered as the 54th in 1756
- 56th (West Essex) Regiment of Foot, raised in 1755 as the 58th and renumbered as the 56th in 1756
