= Percy Charles Wyndham =

English politician

Percy Charles Wyndham (27 September 1757 – 5 August 1833) was an English politician.

He was the second son of Charles Wyndham, 2nd Earl of Egremont and Alicia Maria, daughter of the 2nd Baron Carpenter, and brother of Hon. Charles William Wyndham. He was educated at Westminster School from 1765 to 1774, and then at Christ Church, Oxford in 1774.

Wyndam was a Member of Parliament (MP) for the borough of Chichester from 1782 to 1784, when he lost his seat due to his support for Charles James Fox. At the 1790 election his older brother the 3rd Earl of Egremont returned both Percy and Charles as MPs for his pocket borough of Midhurst. In Parliament, he continued to support Fox.

The Earl sold his interest in Midhurst in 1795, and Percy did not seek re-election in 1796.

Parliament of Great Britain
| Preceded by William Keppel; Thomas Steele | Member of Parliament for Chichester; 1782 – 1784; With: Thomas Steele | Succeeded by George White-Thomas; Thomas Steele |
| Preceded by Edward Cotsford; Hon. Henry Drummond | Member of Parliament for Midhurst; 1790 – 1796; With: Charles Wyndham; Peter Thellusson | Succeeded by Charles Long; Sylvester Douglas |
