= Thomas Steele (British politician) =

British politician (1753–1823)

Thomas Steele PC (17 November 1753 – 8 December 1823) was a British politician at the turn of the nineteenth century.

== Early life ==
Steele was born on 17 November 1753. He was the eldest son of Thomas Steele, Recorder of Chichester, and the former Elizabeth Madgwick of Cuckfield. His younger brother was Robert Steele, MP for Weobley.

He was educated at Westminster School and Trinity College, Cambridge.

== Career ==
His father was connected in Chichester politics with MP John Page, but transferred his allegiance when the Duke of Richmond secured control of the borough. After studying law at the Middle Temple he was elected as MP for Chichester in 1780, holding the seat until 1807.

He held the post of Joint Secretary to the Treasury from 1783 to 1791, Joint Paymaster of the Forces from 1791 to 1804, and King's Remembrancer from 1797 to 1823.

== Personal life ==
On 3 September 1785, Steele married Charlotte Amelia Lindsay, the daughter of Sir David Lindsay, 4th Baronet, of Evelick, Perth. Among her siblings were William Lindsay, the Ambassador to Venice and Governor of Tobago, and Naval officer Sir Charles Lindsay. Her father died in 1797 and the baronetcy passed to her brother Charles but, being childless, it became extinct upon his death by drowning in 1799. The Evelick estate was then inherited by Charlotte-Amelia. Together, they were the parents of a son and two daughters, including:

- Charlotte Steele (d. 1855), who married Nicholas Ridley-Colborne, 1st Baron Colborne, the younger son of Sir Matthew White Ridley, 2nd Baronet, in 1808.

Steele died on 8 December 1823.

=== Relationship with Pitt ===
Steele was a close friend of William Pitt the Younger, the youngest and last prime minister of Great Britain and then first prime minister of the United Kingdom. Pitt's biographer William Hague writes:

Pitt was happiest among his Cambridge companions or family. He had no social ambitions, and it was rare for him to set out to make a friend. The talented collaborators of his first 18 months in office—Beresford, Wyvil and Twining—passed in and out of his mind along with their areas of expertise. Pitt's lack of interest in enlarging his social circle meant that it did not grow to encompass any women outside his own family, a fact that produced a good deal of rumour. From late 1784, a series of satirical verses appeared in The Morning Herald drawing attention to Pitt's lack of knowledge of women: "Tis true, indeed, we oft abuse him,/Because he bends to no man;/But slander's self dares not accuse him/Of stiffness to a woman." Others made snide references to Pitt's friendship with Tom Steele, Secretary to the Treasury. At the height of the constitutional crisis in 1784, Sheridan had compared Pitt to James I's favourite, the Duke of Buckingham, a clear reference to homosexuality.

== Legacy and honours ==
Steel(e) Point, on Sydney Harbour, Australia, was named for him when he was Joint Secretary to the Treasury during the time of Arthur Phillip's governorship.

=== Descendants ===
Through his daughter Charlotte, he was a grandfather of Maria Charlotte Ridley-Colborne (wife of Sir George Nugent, 2nd Baronet, son of Sir George Nugent, 1st Baronet), Henrietta Susannah Ridley-Colborne (wife of Brampton Gurdon), Emily Frances Ridley-Colborne (wife of John Moyer Heathcote), William Ridley-Colborne (MP for Richmond), and Louisa Harriet Ridley-Colborne (wife of Harvie Morton Farquhar, son of Sir Thomas Farquhar, 2nd Baronet).

Parliament of Great Britain
Preceded by William Keppel; Thomas Conolly	Member of Parliament for Chichester; 1780–1801; With: William Keppel 1780–1782; Percy Charles Wyndham 1782–1784; George White-Thomas 1784–1801	Succeeded by Parliament of the United Kingdom
Parliament of the United Kingdom
Preceded by Parliament of Great Britain	Member of Parliament for Chichester; 1801–1807; With: George White-Thomas	Succeeded by George White-Thomas; James du Pre
Political offices
Preceded by Richard Burke	Secretary to the Treasury (junior); 1783–1791	Succeeded by Charles Long
Preceded by Constantine Phipps; Marquess of Graham	Paymaster of the Forces; 1791–1804; With: Dudley Ryder 1791–1800; George Canning 1800–1801; Sylvester Douglas 1801–1803; John Hiley Addington 1803–1804	Succeeded by George Rose; Lord Charles Somerset
Preceded by Edward James Eliot	King's Remembrancer; 1797–1823	Succeeded by Henry William Vincent
