= William Keppel (British Army officer, born 1727) =

British Army officer, politician and courtier (1727–1782)

Lieutenant-General The Honourable William Keppel
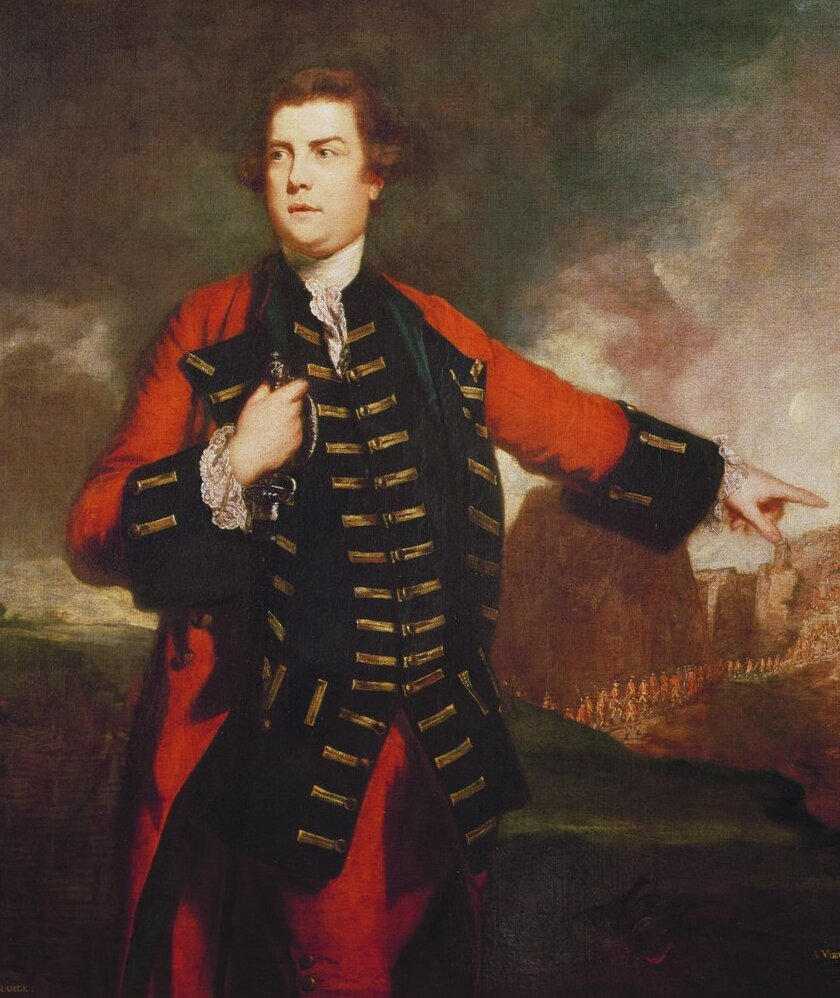
- Portrait by Sir Joshua Reynolds, 1762–1765
- Born: 5 November 1727; England
- Died: 1 March 1782 (aged 54); England
- Alma mater: Westminster School
- Military career
- Allegiance: Great Britain
- Branch: British Army
- Service years: 1744–1782
- Rank: Lieutenant-general
- Units: 2nd Regiment of Foot Guards; 1st Regiment of Foot Guards
- Commands: 56th Regiment of Foot; 14th Regiment of Foot; 12th Light Dragoons; Commander-in-Chief, Ireland
- Conflicts: Seven Years' War; Siege of Havana

Lieutenant-General William Keppel (5 November 1727 – 1 March 1782) was a British Army officer, politician and courtier who served in the Seven Years' War.

== Life ==
William Keppel was born on 5 November 1727, the third son of Willem van Keppel, 2nd Earl of Albemarle, and educated at Westminster School. In 1744, he was commissioned into the British Army's 2nd Regiment of Foot Guards at the rank of ensign, and was promoted to lieutenant in 1745. Keppel was appointed Gentleman of the Horse to George II of Great Britain in 1747, and transferred to the 1st Regiment of Foot Guards at the rank of captain-lieutenant in 1751. He was promoted to captain and then lieutenant colonel in 1752 and colonel in 1760, the same year he stopped serving as Gentleman of the Horse. On 17 December 1761 Keppel was appointed colonel of the 56th Regiment of Foot, which he commanded until 1765. He was promoted to major general in 1762.

In 1762, he took part with his brothers George and Augustus in the siege of Havana, and directed the storming of Morro Castle. In 1763, he succeeded George as the military governor of Cuba, though Havana was returned to Spain in July 1763. On 31 May 1765, Keppel was appointed colonel of the 14th Regiment of Foot, and was promoted to lieutenant-general in 1772. From 1767 until his death, he was a Member of Parliament for Chichester. Keppel was appointed Commander-in-Chief, Ireland in 1773. On 18 October 1775 he was appointed colonel of the 12th (Prince of Wales's) Regiment of (Light) Dragoons, and Keppel died unmarried on 1 March 1782.

Court offices
| Preceded by Hon. Charles Roper | Page of Honour; 1741–1746 | Succeeded by Harvey Smith |
| Preceded by James Brudenell | Gentleman of the Horse; 1747–1760 | Succeeded by Richard Berenger |
Parliament of Great Britain
| Preceded by John Page; Lord George Henry Lennox | Member of Parliament for Chichester; 1767–1782; With: John Page 1767–68; Thomas Conolly 1768–80; Thomas Steele 1780–82 | Succeeded by Thomas Steele; Percy Charles Wyndham |
Military offices
| Preceded by Lord Charles Manners | Colonel of the 56th Regiment of Foot; 1761–1765 | Succeeded by James Durand |
| Preceded by Charles Jeffereys | Colonel of the 14th Regiment of Foot; 1765–1775 | Succeeded by Robert Cuninghame |
| Preceded by Unknown | Commander-in-Chief, Ireland; 1773–1774 | Succeeded by The Lord Heathfield |
| Preceded by Sir William Augustus Pitt | Colonel of the 12th (The Prince of Wales's); Regiment of (Light) Dragoons; 1775–1782 | Succeeded by George Lane Parker |
