= Adela Breton =

English archaeological artist and explorer (1849–1923)

Adela Catherine Breton
- Born: Adela Catherine Breton; 31 December 1849; Paddington, London, England
- Died: 13 June 1923 (aged 73); Bridgetown, Colony of Barbados
- Known for: Painting, Archeology
- Father: William Henry Breton
- Relatives: Henry William Breton

Adela Catherine Breton (31 December 1849 – 13 June 1923) was an English archaeological artist and explorer. She made watercolour copies of the wall paintings of Mexican temples, notably those of the Upper Temple of Jaguars at Chichen Itza.

== Biography ==
Breton was born on 31 December 1849 in Paddington, London to William Henry Breton, a retired naval officer and travel writer, and Elizabeth Breton (née d'Arch; 1820–1874). The eldest of two surviving siblings, the family moved to 15 Camden Crescent, Bath when she was an infant. Through her father, Breton was the niece of the army officer Henry William Breton.

During her childhood the family spent time travelling through Europe, visiting France, Switzerland and Italy. Adela probably studied art while staying in Florence. With much of her time spent in Bath, with its Roman remains, the Bretons took a keen interest in the archaeology. She stayed in Bath to look after her parents in their old age but, after her father died in 1887, she decided to travel. She made a conscious decision not to marry, so she could remain independent and satisfy her wanderlust. She initially headed for Canada (and the United States) where she painted the landscape, before returning to Bath to hold an exhibition of her paintings. In 1892 she made her first visit to Mexico. She hired a local guide, Pablo Solario.

Her time in Mexico was spent travelling on horseback across the country, using her artistic skills to record the friezes, carvings and other archaeological treasures that were being unearthed in the Yucatán. Her first trip lasted 18 months, when she travelled continually making notes and sketches. As the 1890s passed, Breton spent less time on return visits to England and more time on her travels in Mexico. Her observations became more scientific and broadened to include the geology, the canyons and volcanoes. However, she is particularly known for her colour paintings of the frescos discovered at Teotihuacan in 1894, at a site that became known as Teopancaxco. In 1908, she spent four months in Mexico studying the Maguey Plan (a pre-Columbian map of a part of the ancient City of Mexico believed to be done on maguey paper) at the National Museum of Anthropology in order to create a facsimile at the request of British archaeologist Alfred Maudslay.

Breton's travels in Mexico were eventually curtailed by the Mexican Revolution in 1910. She was recognised internationally in her lifetime for her valuable contribution to Mesoamerican archaeology.

Breton died on 13 June 1923 in Bridgetown, Colony of Barbados (present-day Barbados) whilst traveling home from a conference in Rio de Janeiro.

== Legacy ==
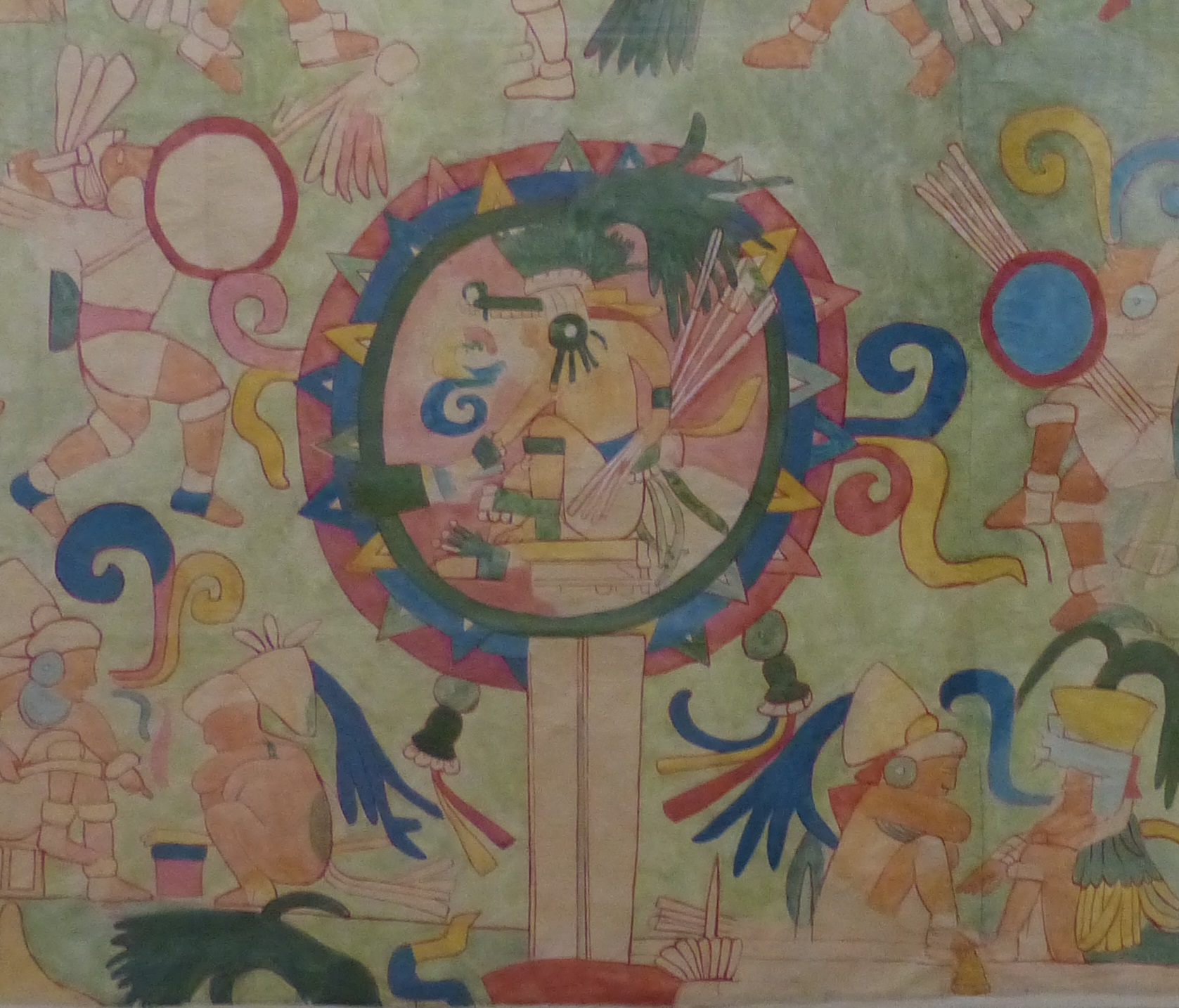
Watercolour by Adele Breton of one of the murals at Chichén Itzá.

A collection of her work is held in Bristol Museum & Art Gallery, where a digitisation project was started in 2014 so that the fragile rolls of paintings can be preserved and made available for research.

Some of her correspondence with Ella Lewis of Philadelphia is held in Harvard University Library.

In 2016 a four-month exhibition entitled "The Remarkable Miss Breton" was held at the Bath Royal Literary & Scientific Institution in Bath. In 2017 an exhibition of her original work was held at the Bristol Museum & Art Gallery.

== Sources ==
- McVicker, Mary French (2005). Adela Breton: A Victorian Artist Amid Mexico's Ruins. University of New Mexico Press. ISBN 978-0-8263-3678-1.
