= Hunt Walsh =

British Army general

General Hunt Walsh (1720 – 28 February 1795) was a British soldier and politician. Since the 1630s his family had owned lands in Ireland at Ballykilcavan, near Stradbally, Queen's County (now County Laois).

He served as an officer in the 28th Regiment of Foot, rising to the rank of major in May 1753, and appointed to the lieutenant-colonelcy on 2 February 1757. During the Seven Years' War he commanded that regiment in North America, where it fought at the capture of Louisbourg and the Battle of the Plains of Abraham.

He was promoted to the rank of colonel in 1760, and appointed to the colonelcy of the 56th Regiment of Foot in 1766, a post he would hold for almost thirty years. He was promoted to major-general in 1772, lieutenant-general in 1777, and full general in 1793. Between 1764 and 1776, he represented Maryborough in the Irish House of Commons.

As a reward for his military service, Lot 11, Prince Edward Island was awarded to Colonel Walsh in the great lottery of 1767. While ownership remained with the heirs of Colonel Walsh, portions of the lot were leased to settlers under the administration of land agents in Prince Edward Island. In 1856, the Walsh heirs sold the lot to the Prince Edward Island colonial government for resale to leaseholders in accordance with the Land Purchase Act of 1853.

He was an uncle of Sir Henry Johnson, 1st Baronet and of John Allen Johnson-Walsh.

Parliament of Ireland
Preceded by William Gilbert; John Parnell	Member of Parliament for Maryborough; 1764–1776; With: John Parnell	Succeeded by Robert Jocelyn, Viscount Jocelyn; Sir John Parnell, 1st Bt
Military offices
Preceded by James Durand	Colonel of the 56th (West Essex) Regiment of Foot; 1766 – 1795	Succeeded by Samuel Hulse
