= Samuel Hulse =

British Army officer

Field Marshal The Right Honourable Sir Samuel Hulse GCH
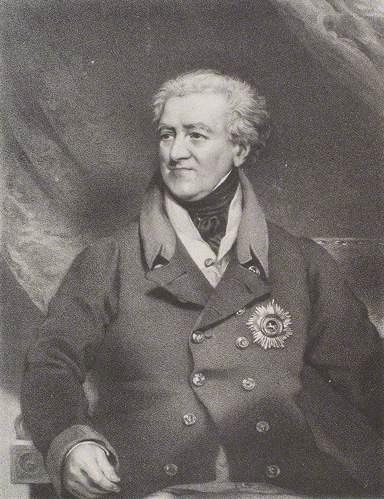
- Born: 27 March 1746
- Died: 1 January 1837 (aged 89); Royal Hospital Chelsea, London
- Burial place: Wilmington, Kent
- Military career
- Allegiance: United Kingdom
- Branch: British Army
- Service years: 1761 – 1837
- Rank: Field Marshal
- Conflicts: Gordon Riots; Flanders Campaign; Anglo-Russian invasion of Holland
- Awards: Knight Grand Cross of the Royal Guelphic Order

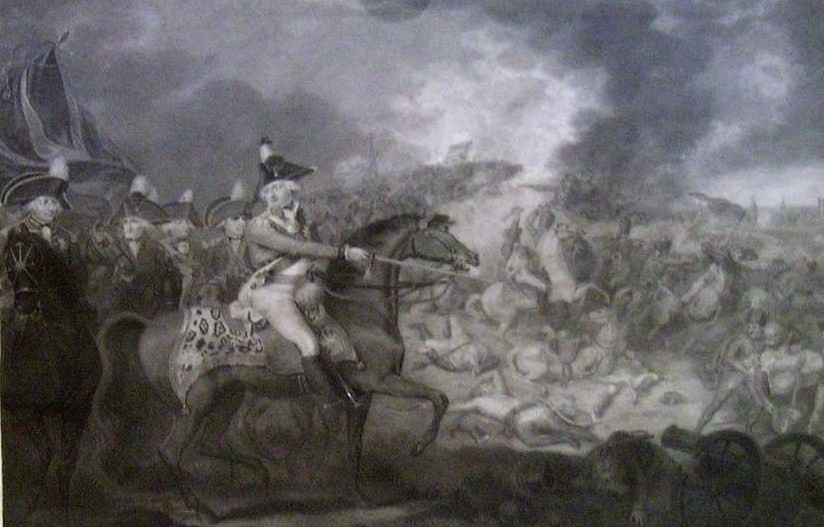
The Battle of Famars in 1793 at which Hulse commanded the 1st Battalion of the Grenadier Guards

Field Marshal Sir Samuel Hulse, GCH (27 March 1746 – 1 January 1837) was a British Army officer. He saw his first active duty during the Gordon Riots in June 1780 before commanding the 1st Battalion of the 1st Regiment of Foot Guards at key battles of the Flanders Campaign during the French Revolutionary Wars. He also commanded the 1st Guards Brigade at a later battle and then joined the retreat into Germany during the closing stages of the Flanders Campaign. He later took part in the Anglo-Russian invasion of Holland and then returned to England to become General Officer Commanding South East District. After completing active service in the Army, he served in the household of King George IV.

== Military career ==
Born the second son of Sir Edward Hulse, 2nd Baronet and Hannah Hulse (née Vanderplank), Samuel Hulse was educated at Eton College and commissioned as an ensign in the 1st Regiment of Foot Guards on 17 December 1761. He was promoted to captain in his regiment on 12 March 1776. He saw his first active duty when he was called out to deal with the Gordon Riots in June 1780. Promoted to colonel in the army on 26 November 1782, he became Treasurer and Receiver-General to the Prince of Wales in January 1787.

Promoted to second major in his regiment on 14 March 1789, and to first major in his regiment on 11 August 1792, Hulse commanded the 1st Battalion at the Battle of Famars in May 1793 and the Siege of Dunkirk in August 1793 during the Flanders Campaign. Promoted to major-general on 18 October 1793, he commanded the 1st Guards Brigade at the Battle of Willems in May 1794 and then joined the retreat into Germany later that year. He was promoted to lieutenant colonel in his regiment on 3 May 1794.

After returning to England in 1795 Hulse was given command of troops in the Brighton area. Promoted to lieutenant general on 9 January 1798, he was sent to Ireland with a brigade of guards at the time of the 1798 rebellion although he was never actually engaged in putting down the rebellion. He took part in the Anglo-Russian invasion of Holland in August 1799 and then returned to England to become General Officer Commanding the South East District with promotion to full general on 25 September 1803. He commissioned the building of West Heath House at Woolwich Road in Erith around this time.

Hulse went on to be lieutenant-governor of the Royal Hospital Chelsea in 1806 and Master of the Household to the Prince of Wales in August 1812. He was appointed a Knight of the Royal Guelphic Order when the Prince ascended to the throne as King George IV in 1820 and knighted in 1821. He also became Governor of the Royal Hospital Chelsea in February 1820 and Vice-Chamberlain of the Household of King George IV as well as a member of the Privy Council in May 1827.

Hulse also served as honorary colonel of the 56th Regiment of Foot, of the 19th Regiment of Foot and then of the 62nd Regiment of Foot. He was promoted to field marshal on the occasion of the coronation of King William IV on 22 July 1830. He died at the Royal Hospital Chelsea on 1 January 1837 and was buried in the family vault at St Michael and All Angels Churchyard at Wilmington in Kent.

== Family ==
Hulse married Charlotte (died 5 February 1842); they had no children.

== Sources ==
- Heathcote, Tony (1999). The British Field Marshals, 1736–1997: A Biographical Dictionary. Barnsley: Leo Cooper. ISBN 0-85052-696-5.

Political offices
Preceded by William Kenrick	Master of the Household; 1812–1827	Succeeded by Sir Frederick Beilby Watson
Preceded by The Marquess of Graham	Vice-Chamberlain of the Household; 1827–1830	Succeeded by The Earl of Belfast
Military offices
Preceded by Hunt Walsh	Colonel of the 56th (the West Essex) Regiment of Foot; 1795–1797	Succeeded by Chapple Norton
Preceded by David Graeme	Colonel of the 19th (The 1st Yorkshire North Riding) Regiment of Foot; 1797–1810	Succeeded by Sir Hew Dalrymple, Bt
Preceded by Sir Eyre Coote	Colonel of the 62nd (Wiltshire) Regiment of Foot; 1810–1837	Succeeded by Sir Frederick Wetherall
Honorary titles
Preceded by Sir David Dundas	Governor, Royal Hospital Chelsea; 1820–1837	Succeeded by Sir Edward Paget
