= James Durand (British Army officer) =

Lieutenant-General James Durand (died 1766) was a British soldier.

He served as an officer in the 1st Foot Guards, rising to the rank of captain and lieutenant-colonel in May 1748, and to major (with the rank of colonel) in 1753. He was appointed major-general in 1759, and rose to the lieutenant-colonelcy of the 1st Foot Guards in 1760. In 1761, he was appointed lieutenant-general, and in June 1765 made the colonel of the 56th Regiment of Foot. Durand died in 1766 and was buried at St Mary's, Twickenham on 6 March; his wife Cornelia had been buried there on 12 January the same year.

Military offices
Preceded by William Keppel	Colonel of the 56th Regiment of Foot; 1765–1766	Succeeded by Hunt Walsh
