= Frederick Beilby Watson =

British courtier

Sir Frederick Beilby Watson, KCH, FRS (1773–11 July 1852) was a British courtier.

Watson was the son of William Watson, who was Ranger of Books (i.e. librarian) at the Treasury, and Elizabeth, née Beilby. In 1805 he became Paymaster of the 1st The Royal Dragoons. On 1 July 1815, he was appointed Assistant Private Secretary to The Prince Regent. Prior to that appointment he had been Private Secretary to the Duke of Cumberland.

In 1819 Watson was appointed a Knight of the Royal Guelphic Order. He was promoted to Knight Commander and appointed a Knight Bachelor in 1827 and became Master of the Household that year, an office he held during the reigns of George IV, William IV, and the early days of Victoria. In 1843, he anonymously had published Religious and Moral Sentences Culled from the Works of Shakespeare, Compared with Sacred Passages Drawn from Holy Writ.

On 11 July 1852, Watson died at his home on New Place, St John's Wood, aged 80. He is buried at Kensal Green Cemetery.

Political offices
Preceded by Sir Samuel Hulse	Master of the Household; 1827–1838	Succeeded by Sir Charles Murray
