= John Home Home =

Lieutenant-General John Home Home
- Military career
- Allegiance: United Kingdom
- Branch: British Army
- Rank: Lieutenant-General
- Commands: Grenadier Guards

Lieutenant-General John Home Home was an officer of the British Army.

== Biography ==
He was the son of John Home, a captain in the Army, who inherited the estate of Bassendean from a cousin, and his wife Mary, née Mackay. Home served as commanding officer of the Grenadier Guards, and acted as lieutenant-governor and commander-in-chief in Nova Scotia. He was also colonel of the 56th Regiment of Foot. He died at his lodgings in Pall Mall, London on 22 April 1860, aged sixty-three. He had no children, and was succeeded by his nephew, John Hutcheson Fergusson (son of James Fergusson and Mary Home), who adopted the name and arms of Home in addition to Fergusson.

Military offices
Preceded by The Earl of Westmorland	Colonel of the 56th (West Essex) Regiment of Foot; 1859–1860	Succeeded by Henry William Breton
