= William Henry Breton =

Royal Navy officer, and colonial administrator in Australia (1799–1887)

- Born: January 7, 1799; Clapham, Surrey, England
- Died: 1887 (aged 87–88) Bath, England
- Allegiance: United Kingdom
- Branch: Royal Navy
- Service years: 1812–1827
- Rank: Commander
- Known for: Travel writing, exploration, magistrate in Van Diemen's Land

William Henry Breton (7 January 1799-1887) was a lieutenant in the Royal Navy who wrote the memoirs Excursions in New South Wales, Western Australia and Van Dieman's Land, during the years 1830, 1831,1832 and 1833, first published in 1833 and Scandinavian Sketches, or, A Tour in Norway, published in 1835. The books resulted from private visits to Australia, or New Holland as it was then known, in 1829-30 and 1832-33 and to Norway, Sweden and Russia in 1834.

== Royal Navy Service ==
"William Henry Breton entered the Navy 7 Jan. 1812; passed his [Lieutenant's] examination in 1818; and obtained his commission 10 March, 1827. He has since been on half-pay", is the entry in the 1849 edition of A Naval Biographical Dictionary. In 1864 as a Lieutenant on the Reserved List he was allowed to assume the rank of Retired Commander. It is also known he served on the following ships

HM Ship	Entry	Rank	Discharge
Vengeur	6/05/1818	Volunteer	20/08/1818
Salisbury	21/08/1818	Master's Mate	4/12/1819
Impregnable	6/04/1820	Midshipman	8/08/1821
Windsor Castle	9/08/1821	Midshipman	24/10/1821
Salisbury	30/10/1821	Midshipman	26/03/1823
Maidstone	4/02/1826	??? Mate	2/02/1827
Maidstone	3/02/1827	Lieutenant	20/02/1827

== New Holland ==
Breton arrived in Fremantle in October 1829, probably (the passenger list has been lost.) on the Lotus (1826 ship), and stayed for about a month exploring the surrounding country before continuing on to Sydney on the Lotus arriving on 4 December 1829. This appears to be the only time he visited Western Australia. He is in NSW for 6 months before traveling to Hobart, arriving 30 June 1830. A fellow passenger is Captain D'Arcy Wentworth Jr. of the 63rd Regiment who is stationed at Bothwell, Tasmania where he is also Police Magistrate. On 20 November 1830 Breton returned to England ending his first visit to Australia.

On his second visit he stayed for about five and a half months arriving in Sydney on 25 August 1832 on the ship Brothers - a fellow passenger being Captain Phillip Parker King. He later travelled to Hobart. In the book he writes when in the colony [ie Van Diemen's Land] in November 1832, however a shipping report shows W. Breton, Esq arriving in Hobart from Sydney on 12 December 1832. It is also likely he attended on 3 November 1832, at Parramatta, the marriage of his brother, at the time a Major in the 4th Regiment of Foot, to Eliza Maria Blaxland, the daughter of John Blaxland (explorer).

On 24 January 1833 he returned to Sydney from Hobart and on 11 February 1833 sailed on the ship Brothers for London.

== Magistrate in Van Dieman's Land ==
Lieutenant Breton began his third visit to Australia on 15 November 1835, sailing on the ship Brothers, disembarking in Hobart. Again Captain Wentworth was a fellow passenger who continued on the ship to Sydney.

On 4 December 1835 he is appointed Justice of the Peace for Van Dieman's Land and a week later appointed a Coroner of the Territory and Police Magistrate for Circular Head. Then on 24 December 1835 he is Police Magistrate at Richmond when an interchange between the magistrates at Circular Head and Richmond is gazetted. As part of the job-swap Breton is also appointed Commissioner of the Court of Requests and Deputy Chairman of the Court of Quarter Sessions, for the Police District of Richmond.

In 1841 he is appointed Police Magistrate in Launceston. He took 18 months leave of absence from this position in 1848. This was extended in 1850 and he resigned in 1852.

== Other interests ==
Breton was a fellow of the London Geological Society. He presented a paper on Conchology at the Launceston Mechanic's Institute of which was also President and while resident in Van Dieman's Land collected fossil shells and "curious pebbles".

He was secretary of the Richmond Book Society. At the time he left the colony he advertised for sale his collection of "nearly one thousand volumes of works of sterling merit, many elegantly bound".

He wrote a paper on the echidna for London Zoological Society and attempted to take one to England in 1833 but it died on the voyage. He collected native implements - one in Tasmania being a stone hammer and anvil arrangement for crushing bones to extract marrow.

In addition he was a Director of the Launceston Branch of the Bank of Australasia, on the committee of the Launceston Church Grammar School, Treasurer of the Launceston Ladies' School of Industry, on the Committee of the Launceston Branch of the Society for Promoting Christian Knowledge and for the Propagation of the Gospel, President of the Launceston Mechanics Institute, on member of The Tasmanian Society of Natural Science, Agriculture, Statistics, etc, on the Committee of the Launceston Horticultural Society and on the Committee of St John's Hospital Launceston.

== Family Life ==
William Henry Breton was born on 7 January 1799 in Clapham Surrey. His parents were Peter, an assistant judge/magistrate in Jamaica and Lucy (née Goldwin) Breton. Peter died in 1803 and Lucy in 1820. He had 10 siblings. One, his twin brother Henry William Breton would later join the army and cross paths with William in Australia. William, his mother and siblings were beneficiaries in the will of his uncle Thomas Goldwin, a former sugar plantation owner in Jamaica, who died in 1809.

In 1844 he married Elizabeth Anne D'Arch in Launceston, Tasmania. It was a double wedding with Elizabeth's sister Mary marrying Thomas Craufurd. Elizabeth was born in Paddington, Essex on 18 May 1820. After the death of her father, Elizabeth with her mother and sisters Mary, Sarah and Sophia had come to Van Diemans land in 1837 to stay with her brother Henry D'Arch, a Magistrate and Collector of Customs in Launceston.

In 1849 William and Elizabeth returned to London and a daughter, Adela Breton was born there that year. A son Harry D'Arch Breton was born in Bath in 1851. In 1852 he purchased a four storey Georgian townhouse in Camden Crescent Bath.

He travelled again to Van Dieman's land for about 10 weeks in 1854, possibly to finalise his business interests in the colony and collect property . He sold his house in Richmond, now known as the Old Rectory at this time.

He died in 1887 at his Bath residence at the age of 88. His wife predeceased him in 1874. Adela was sole beneficiary of his estate valued at £45,587.

A photograph of William with his wife, daughter and brother Henry is online at the Bristol Museum.
