= Henry William Breton =

British Army general

General Henry William Breton
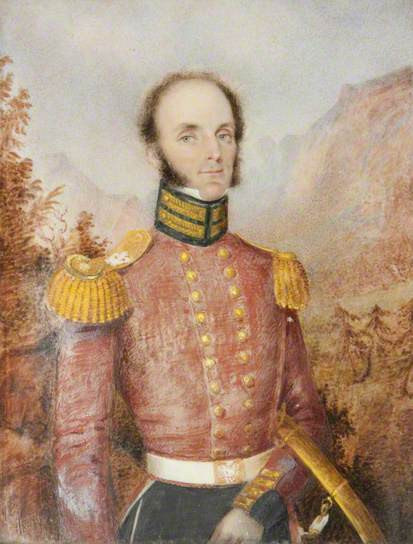
- Born: 7 January 1799
- Died: 22 July 1889 (aged 90)
- Military career
- Allegiance: United Kingdom
- Branch: British Army
- Rank: General
- Commands: South-West District

General Henry William Breton (7 January 1799 – 22 July 1889) was a British Army officer who became General Officer Commanding South-West District. His twin brother was William Henry Breton.

== Military career ==
Breton was commissioned as an ensign in the 4th Regiment of Foot in March 1815. He became commanding officer of the 53rd Regiment of Foot in 1848 and a brigade commander in India in April 1850. Promoted to major-general in 1851, he became General Officer Commanding South-West District in February 1855 and commander of the troops in Mauritius in 1857.

He also served as the twelfth and final colonel of the 56th (West Essex) Regiment of Foot from 23 April 1860 to 1881, when the regiment amalgamated with the 44th Foot to form the Essex Regiment. He continued afterwards as the Colonel of the 2nd Battalion of the Essex regiment.

He was promoted Lieutenant-General 15 December 1861.

He was buried at Highland Road Cemetery in Portsmouth.

Military offices
Preceded by Sir James Simpson	GOC South-West District; 1855–1857	Succeeded by Sir James Scarlett
Preceded by John Home Home	Colonel of the 56th (West Essex) Regiment of Foot; 1860–1881	Merged into the Essex Regiment
