= Lord Wentworth's Regiment =

English Royalist infantry unit of the Interregnum era

Lord Wentworth's Regiment was a regiment of infantry raised during the exile of King Charles II during the Interregnum to serve in the Royalist Army in Exile. Formed as the Royal Regiment of Guards in 1656 at Bruges under the command of the Earl of Rochester. It was made up of men who remained loyal to the King and had followed him into exile. When Rochester died in February 1658 command passed to Thomas Wentworth, 5th Baron Wentworth. The regiment served as part of the Spanish Army during the Franco-Spanish War and the concurrent Anglo-Spanish War in the Spanish Netherlands and saw action at the Battle of the Dunes (1658) under the command of Wentworth, before accompanying the King back to England to reclaim the throne at the Restoration in 1660. In 1665, the regiment was amalgamated with John Russell's Regiment of Guards to form the 1st Regiment of Foot Guards.
