= Grenadier Guards =

Infantry regiment of the British Army

- Regimental badge of the Grenadier Guards (Note: Since 6 May 2023)
- Active: 1656–present
- Country: England (1660–1707); Great Britain (1707–1800); United Kingdom (1801–present)
- Branch: British Army
- Type: Infantry
- Role: 1st Battalion – Light Infantry/Public Duties; Nijmegen Company – Public Duties
- Size: One battalion – 558 personnel One independent company One reserve company
- Part of: Guards and Parachute Division
- Garrison/HQ: RHQ – London; 1st Battalion – Aldershot; Nijmegen Company – London; Ypres Company – Kingston upon Thames
- Nickname: The Tow Rows
- Mottos: French: Honi soit qui mal y pense "Shame be to him who thinks evil of it."
- March: Quick: "The British Grenadiers"; Slow: "Scipio"
- Engagements: Oudenarde; Waterloo; Alma; Inkerman; Sevastopol; Omdurman; Ypres; Battle of the Bulge; Cyprus Emergency; Malayan Emergency

Commanders
- Colonel-in-Chief: King Charles III
- Colonel of the Regiment: Queen Camilla

Insignia
- Tactical recognition flash
- Plume: White; Left side of bearskin cap
- Collar badge: Grenade
- Shoulder badge: Royal Cypher
- Abbreviation: GREN GDS

The Grenadier Guards (GREN GDS), with full official title "The 1st or Grenadier Regiment of Foot Guards", is the most senior infantry regiment of the British Army, being at the top of the Infantry Order of Precedence. It can trace its lineage back to 1656 when Lord Wentworth's Regiment was raised in Bruges to protect the exiled Charles II. In 1665, this regiment was combined with John Russell's Regiment of Guards to form the current regiment, known as the 1st Regiment of Foot Guards. Since then, the regiment has filled both a ceremonial and protective role as well as an operational one. In 1900, the regiment provided a cadre of personnel to form the Irish Guards; in 1915 it also provided the basis of the Welsh Guards upon their formation.

The regiment's early history saw it take part in numerous conflicts including the War of the Spanish Succession, the War of the Austrian Succession, the Seven Years' War, and the Napoleonic Wars; at the end of this period the regiment was granted the "Grenadier" designation by a Royal Proclamation. During the Victorian era, the regiment took part in the Crimean War, the Anglo-Egyptian War, the Mahdist War, and the Second Boer War.

During the First World War, the Grenadier Guards was expanded from three battalions to five, of which four served on the Western Front, while later during the Second World War, six battalions were raised, and several were converted to an armoured role as part of the Guards Armoured Division. These units fought in France, North-West Europe, North Africa and Italy.

After the Second World War the regiment was reduced first to three battalions, then to two, and finally to one battalion in the mid-1990s. Major deployments during this time have included operations in Palestine, Malaya, Cyprus, Northern Ireland, the Gulf War, Afghanistan and Iraq.

== History ==
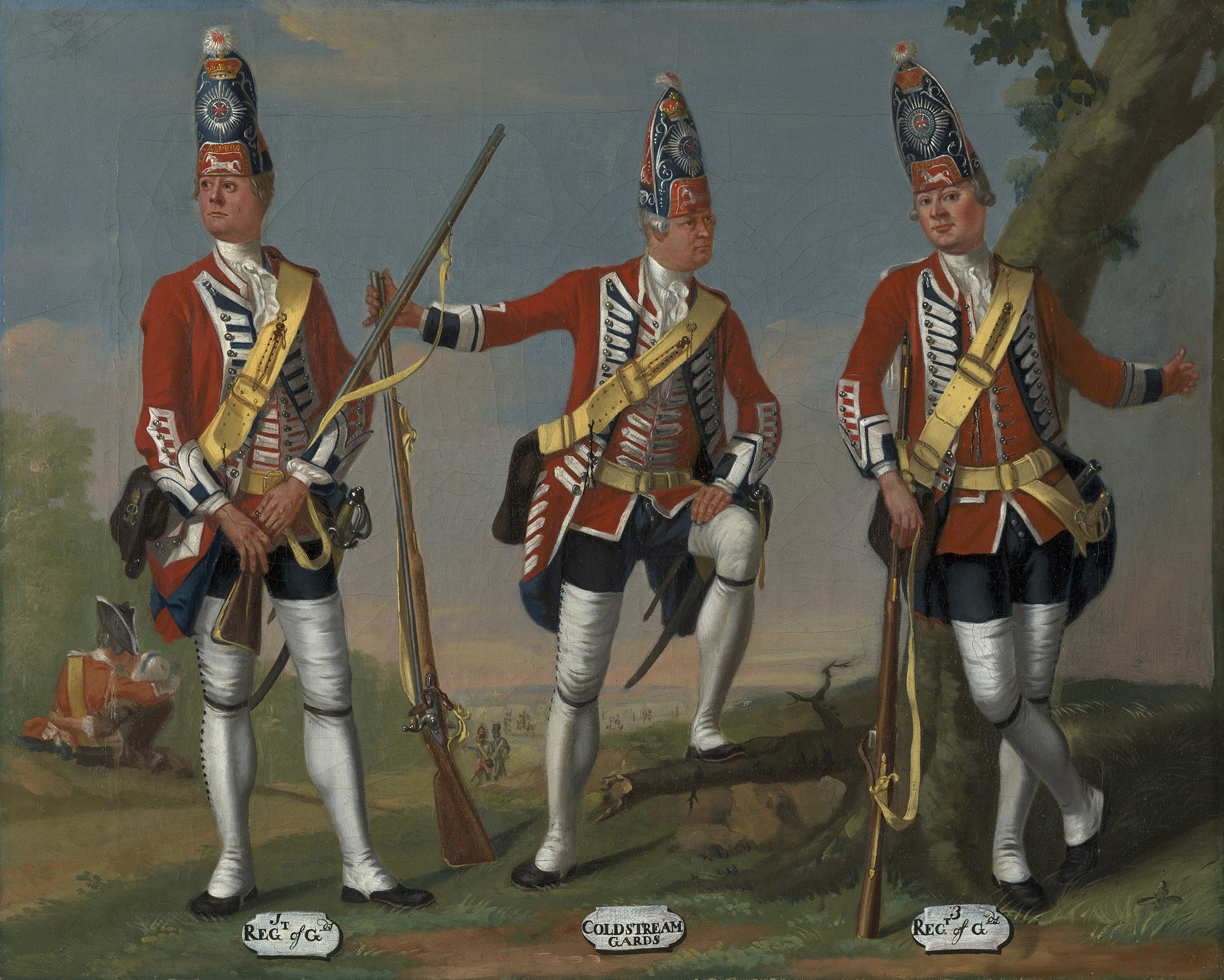
c. 1751 painting of a regimental grenadier (left)

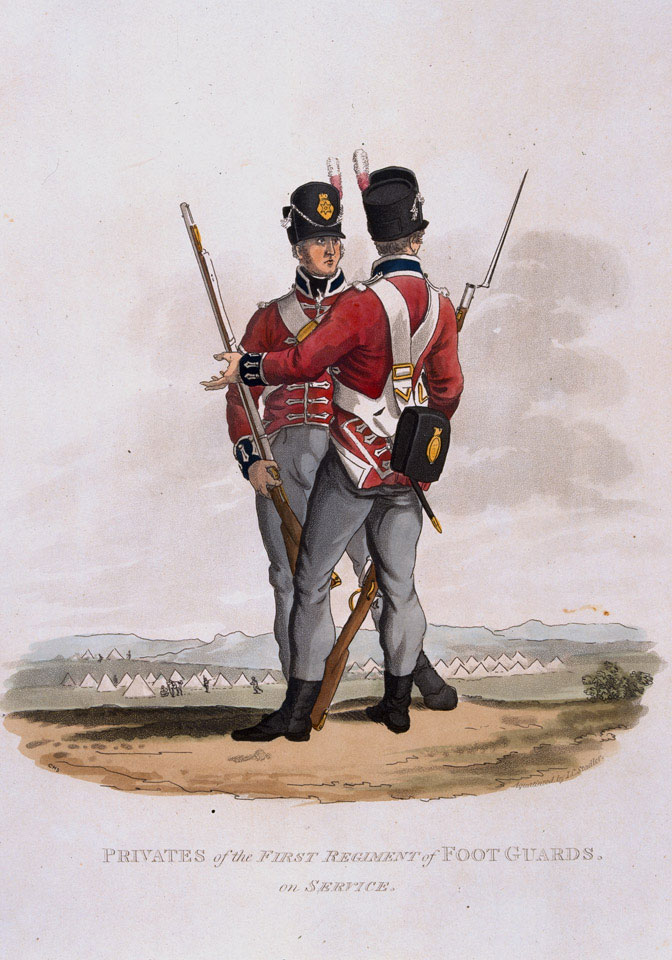
1812 engraving of two regimental privates

The Grenadier Guards trace their lineage back to 1656, when Lord Wentworth's Regiment was raised from gentlemen of the Honourable Artillery Company by the then heir to the throne, Prince Charles (later King Charles II), in Bruges, in the Spanish Netherlands (present-day Belgium), where it formed a part of the exiled King's bodyguard. A few years later, a similar regiment known as John Russell's Regiment of Guards was formed. In 1665, these two regiments were combined to form the 1st Regiment of Foot Guards, consisting of 24 companies of men. Throughout the 18th century, the regiment took part in a number of campaigns including the War of Spanish Succession, the War of Austrian Succession and the Seven Years' War. At the end of the Napoleonic Wars, the regiment gained the name "Grenadier" in July 1815 following a Royal Proclamation.

During the Victorian era, the regiment took part in the Crimean War, participating in the fighting at the Alma river, Inkerman, and Sevastopol. For their involvement in the Crimean War, four members of the 3rd Battalion received the Victoria Cross. Later the regiment fought at Battle of Tel el-Kebir during the Anglo-Egyptian War in 1882, and then the Mahdist War in Sudan, both during the 1885 Suakin Expedition and in 1898, at the Battle of Omdurman.

Warrant officers and colour sergeants of the 1st Battalion, Grenadier Guards, 1897

During the Second Boer War, the 2nd and 3rd battalions were deployed to South Africa, where they took part in a number of battles including the Battle of Modder River and the Battle of Belmont, as well as a number of smaller actions. In 1900, seventy-five men from the regiment were used to raise a fourth Guards regiment, known as the Irish Guards in honour of the role that Irish regiments had played in the fighting in South Africa.

=== First World War ===
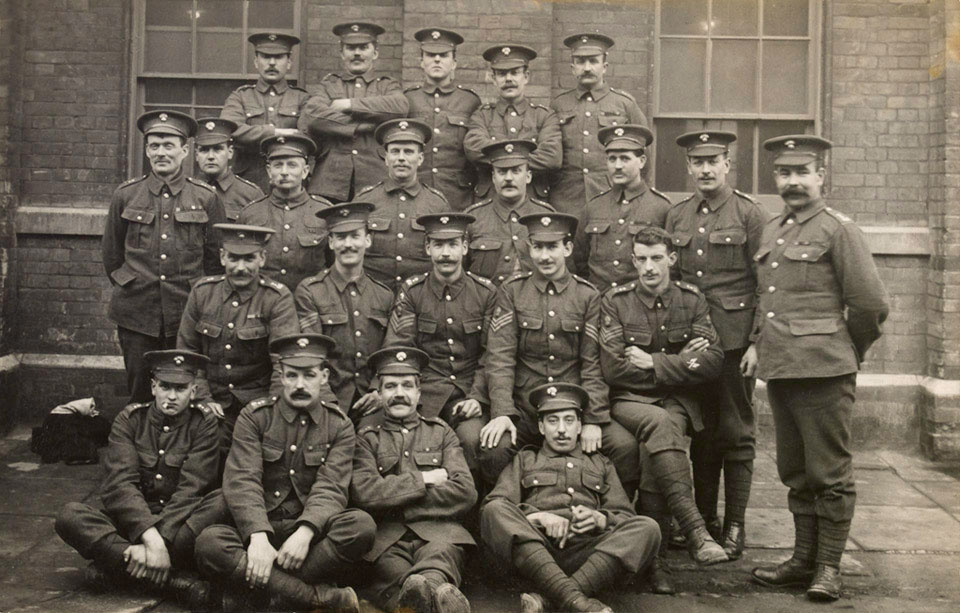
Soldiers of the 4th Battalion, Grenadier Guards in 1914

At the outbreak of the First World War in August 1914, the regiment consisted of three battalions and the regiment's commanding officer was Colonel Henry Streatfeild. With the commencement of hostilities, the regiment raised a service battalion, the 4th Battalion, and a reserve battalion, known as the 5th (Reserve) Battalion, which was used to carry out ceremonial duties in London and Windsor during the war.

The 2nd Battalion of the regiment was sent to France in August, and the 1st Battalion followed to Belgium in October. They took part in the early stages of the fighting during the period known as "Race to the Sea", during which time they were involved significantly at the First Battle of Ypres.

In February 1915, a fifth Guards regiment was raised, known as the Welsh Guards. In recognition of the significant contribution Welshmen had made to the Grenadier Guards, the regiment transferred five officers and 634 other ranks to the newly formed unit.

A short time later, permission was received for the formation of the Guards Division, the brainchild of Field Marshal Lord Kitchener, and on 18 August 1915, the division, under the command of Major General The Earl of Cavan of the regiment, came into existence, consisting of three brigades, each with four battalions. Following this the four service battalions of the regiment fought in a number of significant battles including Loos, the Somme, Cambrai, Arras and the Hindenburg Line.

Following the Armistice with Germany in November 1918, the regiment returned to just three battalions, which were used in a variety of roles, serving at home in the United Kingdom, as well as in France, Turkey and Egypt.

Seven members of the Grenadier Guards received the Victoria Cross during the First World War.

=== Second World War ===
During the Second World War, the regiment was expanded to six service battalions, with the re-raising of the 4th Battalion, and the establishment of the 5th and 6th Battalions. The Grenadier Guards' first involvement in the war came in the early stages of the fighting when all three regular battalions were sent to France in late 1939 as part of the British Expeditionary Force (BEF). The 1st and 2nd Battalions were serving in the 7th Guards Brigade, which also included the 1st Battalion, Coldstream Guards, and were part of the 3rd Infantry Division, led by Major General Bernard Montgomery. The 3rd Battalion was in the 1st Guards Brigade attached to the 1st Infantry Division, commanded by Major General Harold Alexander. As the BEF was pushed back by the German blitzkrieg during the battles of France and Dunkirk, these battalions played a considerable role in maintaining the British Army's reputation during the withdrawal phase of the campaign before being themselves evacuated from Dunkirk. After this, they returned to the United Kingdom, where they undertook defensive duties in anticipation of a possible German invasion. Between October 1940 and October 1941, the regiment raised the 4th, 5th, and 6th Battalions. Later, in the summer of 1941, there was a need to increase the number of armoured and motorised units in the British Army and as a result many infantry battalions were converted into armoured regiments; the 2nd and 4th Battalions were re-equipped with tanks, while the 1st Battalion was motorised. The 1st and 2nd (Armoured) Battalions were part of the 5th Guards Armoured Brigade, attached to the Guards Armoured Division, and the 4th Battalion was part of the 6th Guards Tank Brigade Group. They subsequently served in the North West Europe Campaign of 1944–45, taking part in several actions, including the Battle for Caen, particularly in Operation Goodwood, as well as Operation Market Garden, the Battle of the Bulge and Operation Veritable.

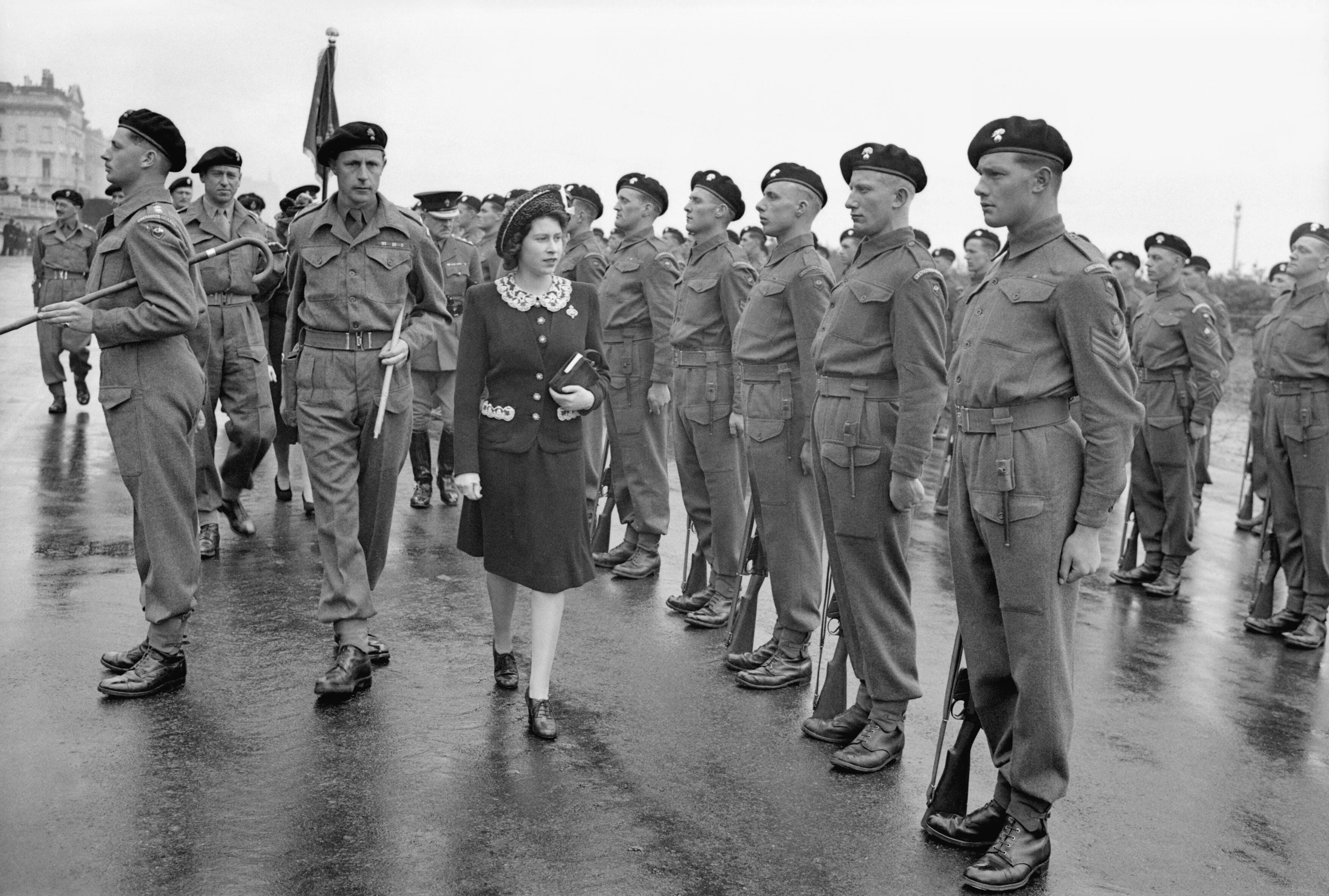
Princess Elizabeth inspecting a regimental honour guard during a visit to Hove, 17 May 1944

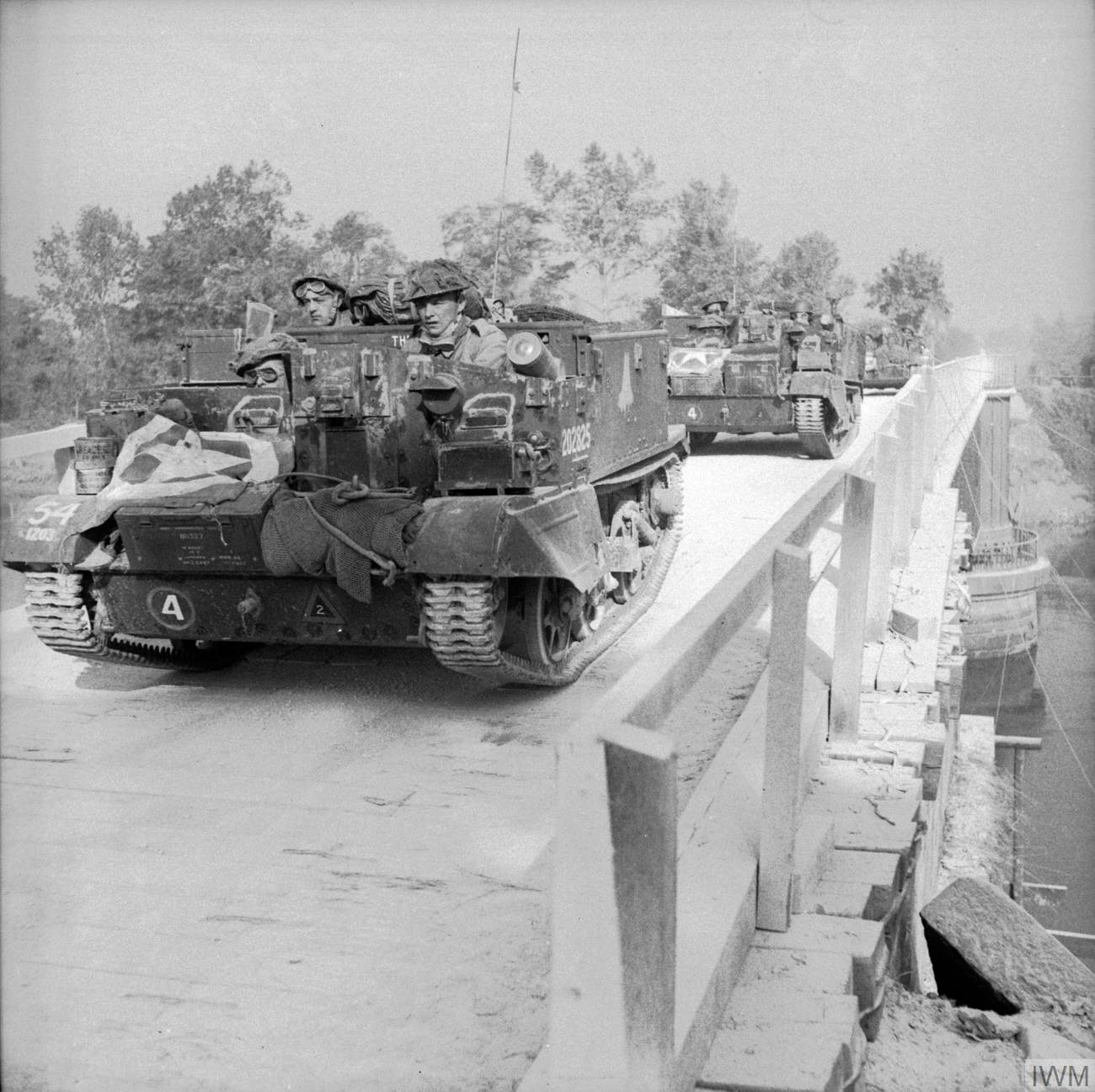
Universal Carriers of the 1st Battalion, Grenadier Guards prior to Operation Goodwood, 18 July 1944

The 3rd, 5th and 6th Battalions served in the North African Campaign and in the final stages of the Tunisia Campaign, under command of the British First Army, where they fought significant battles in the Medjez-el-Bab and along the Mareth Line. The battalions took part in the Italian Campaign at Salerno, Monte Camino, Anzio, Monte Cassino, and along the Gothic Line. The 3rd Battalion, still with the 1st Guards Brigade, was attached to the 78th Battleaxe Infantry Division for two months in Tunisia until it was exchanged for the 38th (Irish) Brigade and became part of the 6th Armoured Division, where it would remain for the rest of the war. The 5th Battalion was part of 24th Guards Brigade and served with the 1st Division during the Battle of Anzio. After suffering devastating casualties, the brigade was relieved in March 1944. The 6th Battalion served with the 22nd Guards Brigade, later redesignated 201st Guards Motor Brigade, until late 1944 when the battalion was disbanded due to an acute shortage of Guards replacements. During the course of the conflict, two men of the regiment were awarded the Victoria Cross. They were Lance Corporal Harry Nicholls of the 3rd Battalion, during the Battle of Dunkirk, and Major William Sidney of the 5th Battalion during the Battle of Anzio in March 1944.

=== After the Second World War ===
In June 1945, following the end of hostilities, the 2nd and 4th Battalions gave up their tanks and returned to an infantry role. The regiment returned to three battalions at this time, with the 4th and 5th Battalions being disbanded along with the 6th, which had been removed from the order of battle before the end of the war. Initially, the regiment was employed on occupation duties in Germany; however, the 3rd Battalion was deployed shortly afterwards to Palestine, where it attempted to keep the peace until May 1948, when it was replaced by the 1st Battalion. Further deployments came to Malaya in 1948, Tripoli in 1951 and Cyprus in 1956. In 1960, shortly after returning from Cyprus, the 3rd Battalion paraded for the last time and was subsequently placed in suspended animation. In order to maintain the battalion's customs and traditions, one of its companies, The Inkerman Company, was incorporated into the 1st Battalion.

Since the mid-1960s, the 1st and 2nd Battalions have been deployed to Africa, South America and Northern Ireland where they undertook peacekeeping duties. They also undertook duties as part of the NATO force stationed in Germany during the Cold War. In 1991, the 1st Battalion, which had been serving in Germany, was deployed to the Middle East, where it took part in the Persian Gulf War mounted in Warrior armoured personnel carriers, before returning for a six-month tour of Northern Ireland.

=== 21st century ===
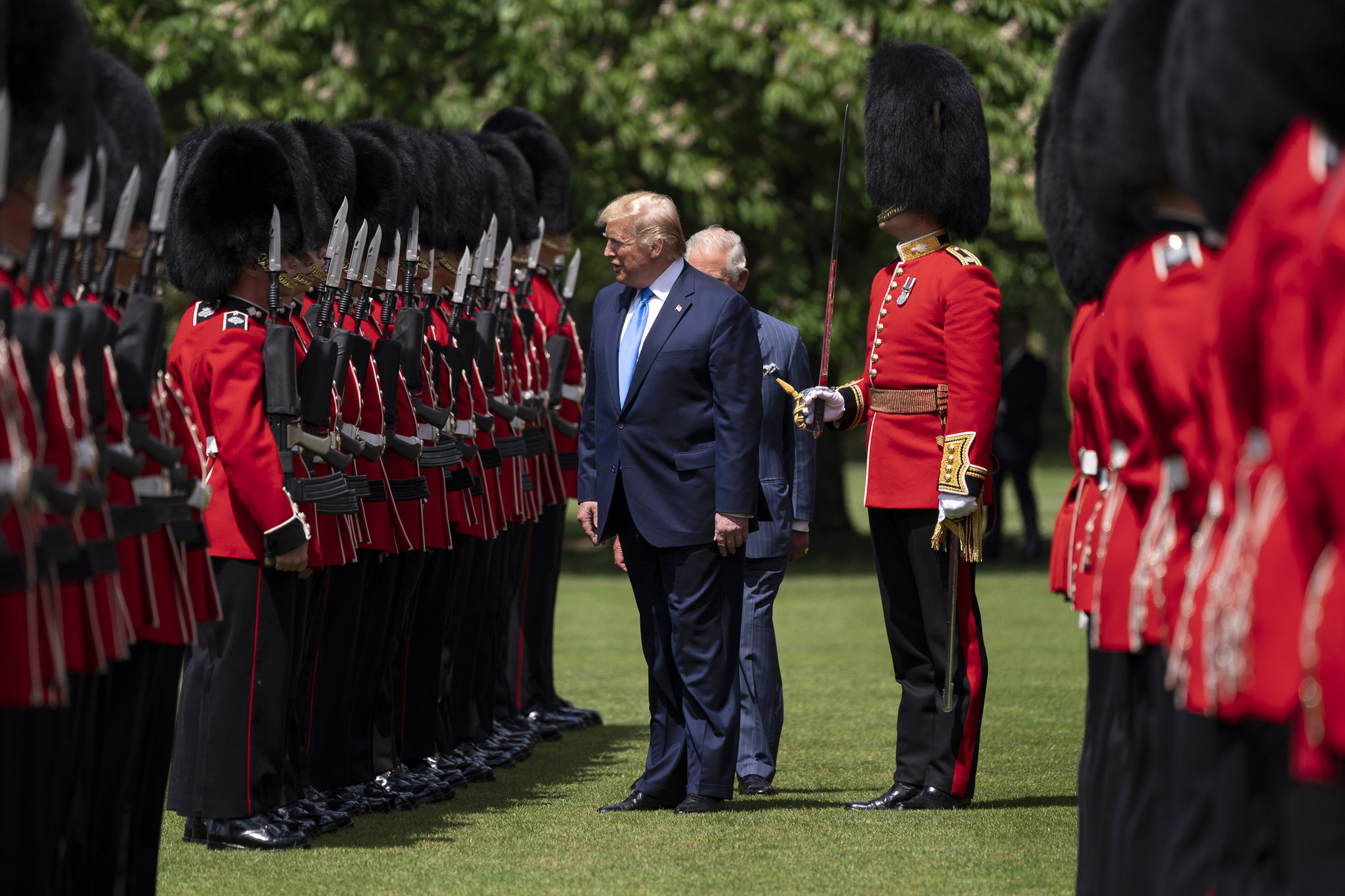
U.S. president Donald Trump and the Prince of Wales inspect Nijmegen Company, Grenadier Guards in the Garden at Buckingham Palace, June 2019

In 2002, the 1st Battalion deployed as part of as Operation Herrick in Afghanistan, and in 2003, it deployed as part of Operation Telic in Iraq.

As of 2014, recruits to the Guards Division go through a thirty-week training programme at the Infantry Training Centre (ITC). The training is two weeks longer than the training for the Regular line infantry regiments of the British Army; the extra training, carried out throughout the course, is devoted to drill and ceremonies.

In 2012, Lance Corporal James Ashworth of the Grenadier Guards was awarded the Victoria Cross posthumously for bravery in Helmand Province, Afghanistan.

In 2020, during the COVID-19 pandemic, members of the regiment helped assist the NHS for testing of COVID-19 patients, and provided checkpoints throughout London in collaboration with the Royal Anglian Regiment.

== Battle honours ==
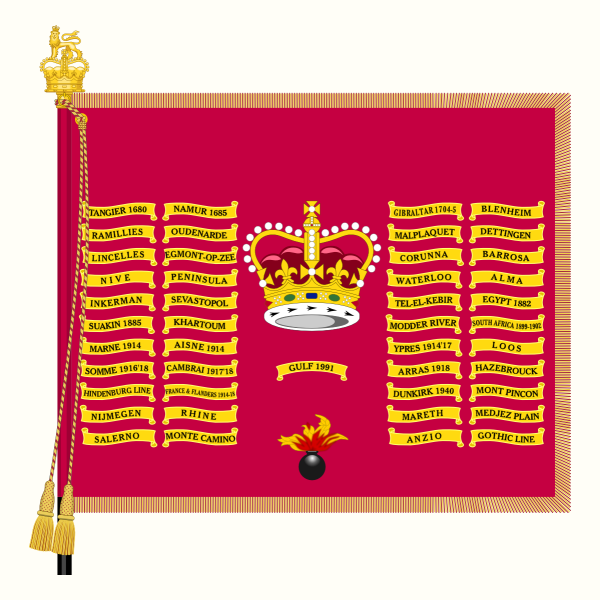
King's colour of the 1st Battalion Grenadier Guards. In contrast with those of the line infantry regiments, the king's colours of Foot Guards regiments are crimson, and it is their regimental colours that are based on the Union Flag. Foot Guards regiments also emblazon the same honours (from all conflicts, including both World Wars) on both colours.

The 1st Foot Guards has received 78 battle honours, gained for its involvement in a number of conflicts including:

- the War of the Spanish Succession, (1701–1714) including Oudenarde
- the War of the Austrian Succession (1740–1748)
- the Napoleonic Wars, including the Peninsular War (1808–1814) and the Battle of Waterloo (1815)
- the Crimean War (1854–1855)
- the Egyptian War (1882)
- the Sudan Campaigns of 1885 and 1898
- the Second Boer War (1889–1902)
- the First World War (Western Front) (1914–1918)
- the Second World War (North Africa, Italy, Northwest Europe) (1939–1945)
- the Persian Gulf War (1990–1991)

== Regimental structure ==
In 1994, under the Options for Change reforms, the Grenadier Guards was reduced to a single battalion. The 2nd Battalion was put into "suspended animation", and its colours passed for safekeeping to a newly formed independent company, which was named "Nijmegen Company". As a result of this, the regiment was reduced to its current composition: one full battalion, the 1st Battalion, consisting of three rifle companies (The King's Company, No. 2 Company and The Inkerman Company), a support company and a headquarters company, and one independent company, Nijmegen Company, based at Wellington Barracks, London. The Queen, as Colonel-in-Chief, presented new colours to Nijmegen Company in 2013.

Following the Integrated Review, G (Guards) Company, London Regiment based at Kingston upon Thames, re-badged and became Ypres Company, Grenadier Guards.

=== King's Company ===
The King's Company (or Queen's Company when the monarch is female, or Sovereign's Company in general) of the Grenadier Guards is the premier ceremonial unit of the regiment and one of the oldest bodies of troops in the British Army. It traditionally provides the pallbearers for all deceased monarchs, most recently at the State funeral of Elizabeth II in 2022. They played a role in the Coronation of Charles III and Camilla, with a colour party being present in Westminster Abbey. All soldiers within the company are over the height of six feet (1.8m).

The Company does not have a company commander, as the monarch assigns executive authority for the daily administration to a trusted subject, who holds the title of "Captain-Lieutenant" (or simply shortened to "The Captain"), who actually holds the rank of Major. Since the company's inception in 1656, there have been 367 Captains over time leading the Company on the Sovereigns' behalf. The company Royal Standard is gifted by the monarch and is now paraded only in the Sovereign's presence. In 1656, King Charles II issued the first colour to the company and every monarch since has presented their company with their own royal standard just once in their reign, with the exception of King George II, whose colour was, in 1709, was shot to pieces at the Battle of Malplaquet, and subsequently replaced the following year. In April 2023, King Charles III presented a new Royal standard bearing his cypher and crown to the King's Company.

== Colonels-in-Chief ==
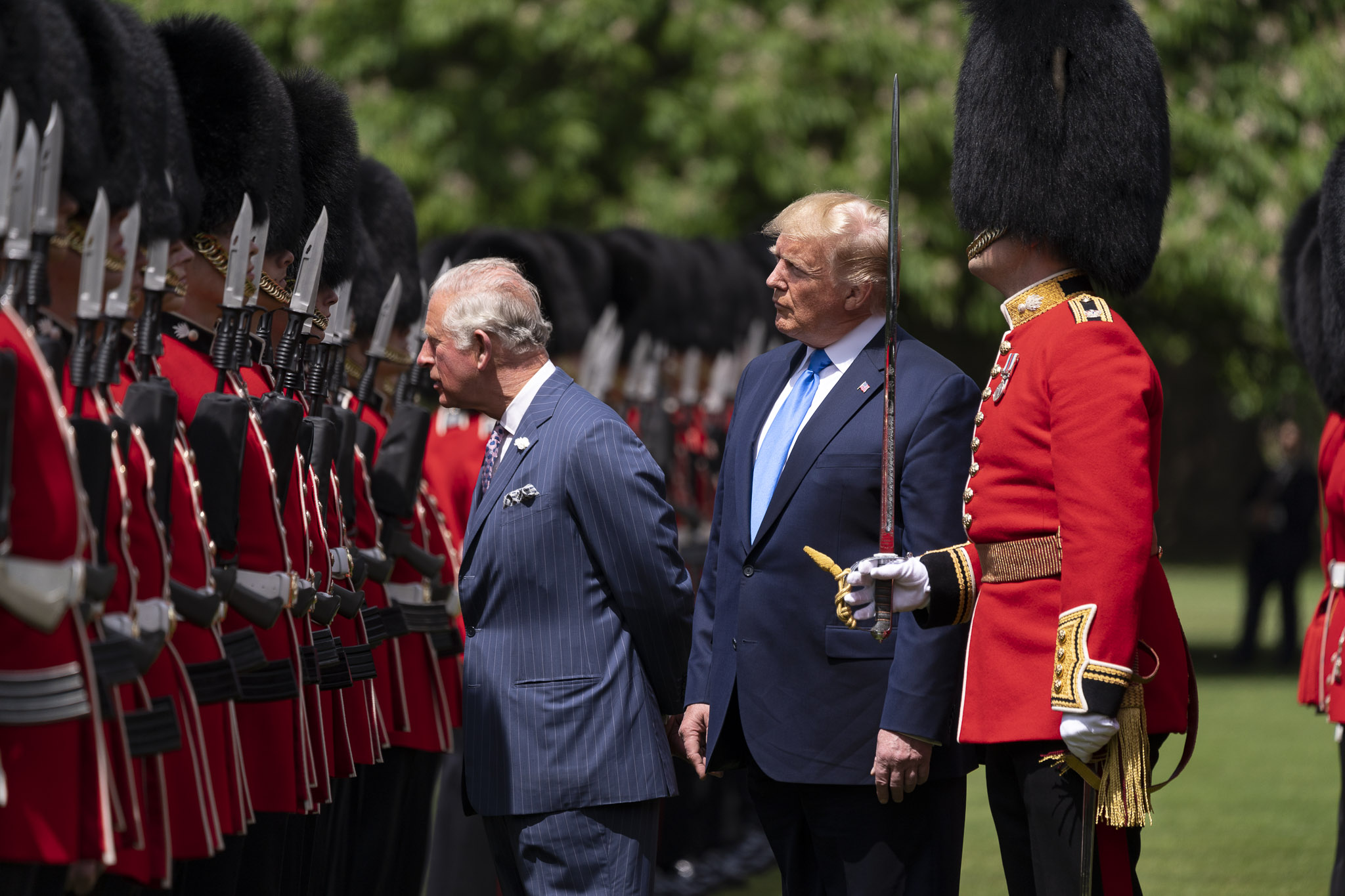
Charles III, when Prince of Wales, with US President Donald Trump in 2019

King Edward VII assumed the colonelcy-in-chief of the regiment on his accession, and subsequent monarchs have also been colonel-in-chief.

- 1901–1910: King Edward VII
- 1915–1936: King George V
- Jan 1936–Dec 1936: King Edward VIII
- 1936–1952: King George VI
- 1952–2022: Queen Elizabeth II
- 2022–present: King Charles III

== Regimental Colonels ==
The following is a list of individuals who have served in the role of colonel of the regiment:

- 1656–1660: Major General Thomas Wentworth, 5th Baron Wentworth
- 1660–1681: Colonel John Russell
- 1681–1688: Major General Henry FitzRoy, 1st Duke of Grafton
- 1688: Edward Lee, 1st Earl of Lichfield
- 1688–1689: Major General Henry FitzRoy, 1st Duke of Grafton
- 1689–1690: Lieutenant General Henry Sydney, 1st Earl of Romney
- 1690–1693: Lieutenant General Charles Schomberg, 2nd Duke of Schomberg
- 1693–1704: Lieutenant General Henry Sydney, 1st Earl of Romney
- 1704–1712: General John Churchill, 1st Duke of Marlborough
- 1712–1714: General James Butler, 2nd Duke of Ormonde
- 1714–1722: General John Churchill, 1st Duke of Marlborough
- 1722–1726: Lieutenant General William Cadogan, 1st Earl Cadogan
- 1726–1742: General Sir Charles Wills
- 1742–1757: General Prince William, Duke of Cumberland
- 1757–1770: Field Marshal John Ligonier, 1st Earl Ligonier
- 1770–1805: Field Marshal Prince William Henry, Duke of Gloucester and Edinburgh
- 1805–1827: Field Marshal Prince Frederick, Duke of York and Albany
- 1827–1852: Field Marshal Arthur Wellesley, 1st Duke of Wellington
- 1852–1861: Field Marshal Prince Albert of Saxe-Coburg and Gotha
- 1861–1904: Field Marshal Prince George, Duke of Cambridge
- 1904–1942: Field Marshal Prince Arthur, Duke of Connaught and Strathearn
- 1942–1952: Princess Elizabeth, Duchess of Edinburgh
- 1952–1960: General George Jeffreys, 1st Baron Jeffreys
- 1960–1975: Major General Sir Allan Adair
- 1975–2017: Field Marshal Prince Philip, Duke of Edinburgh
- 2017–2022: Vice Admiral Prince Andrew, Duke of York
- 2022–present: Queen Camilla

=== Regimental Lieutenant Colonels ===
For many years each Foot Guards regiment was commanded by a Colonel (called, for historical reasons, the Lieutenant Colonel). In the 1980s, the army having reduced in size, the role was judged no longer to justify the appointment of a full colonel, so in 1986 a Lieutenant Colonel was appointed; but in 1989 the appointment of full-time officers to command each regiment ceased. Instead, a senior serving or recently retired officer (of at least the rank of colonel) is appointed as Regimental Lieutenant Colonel; the Regimental Lieutenant Colonel oversees the 'regimental affairs' of the regiment.

The Regimental Lieutenant Colonels have included:

- 1665–1676: Edward Grey
- 1676–1678: Brig. Gen. the Lord Howard of Escrick
- 1678–1682: Sir Samuel Clarke
- 1682–1686: John Strode
- 1686–1688: William Eyton
- 1688–1689: Thomas Stradling
- 1689–1695: Charles O'Hara
- 1695–1722: Lt. Gen. Henry Withers
- 1722–1729: Lt. Gen. William Tatton
- 1729–1735: Maj. Gen. Richard Russell
- 1735–1738: John Guise
- 1738–1739: Francis Fuller
- 1739–1743: Brig. Gen. Charles Frampton
- 1743–1748: Lt. Gen. John Folliot
- 1749–1758: Maj. Gen. Alexander Dury
- 1758–1760: Edward Carr
- 1760–1765: Lt. Gen. James Durand
- 1765–1768: Maj. Gen. Joseph Hudson
- 1768–1770: Edward Urmston
- 1770–1775: John Salter
- 1775–1775: The Hon. Philip Sherard
- 1775–1781: Francis Craig
- 1781–1782: Maj. Gen. William Thornton
- 1782–1789: Maj. Gen. West Hyde
- 1789–1792: Maj. Gen. George Garth
- 1792–1794: Maj. Gen. Gerard Lake
- 1794–1795: Maj. Gen. Samuel Hulse
- 1795–1797: Maj. Gen. Edmund Stevens
- 1797–1799: Maj. Gen. Francis D'Oyly
- 1799–1801: Maj. Gen. Andrew John Drummond
- 1801–1804: Lt. Gen. the Hon. Francis Needham
- 1804–1813: Lt. Gen. Sir Harry Burrard
- 1813–1814: Maj. Gen. the Hon. John Leslie
- 1814–1821: Col. Lord Frederick Bentinck
- 1821–1830: Col. the Hon. Horatio George Powys Townshend
- 1830–1837: Col. John George Woodford
- 1837–1838: Col. Henry D'Oyly
- 1838–1840: Col. Samuel Lambert
- 1840–1845: Col. Taylor Grant
- 1845–1849: Col. John Home
- 1849–1850: Col. Charles Francis Rowley Lascelles
- 1850–1852: Col. Sir Ord John Honyman
- 1852–1853: Col. Godfrey Thornton
- 1853–1854: Col. Philip Spencer Stanhope
- 1854–1857: Col. Thomas Wood
- 1857–1859: Col. Charles William Ridley
- 1859–1860: Col. Frederick William Hamilton
- 1860–1861: Col. the Hon. James Lindsay
- 1861–1864: Col. John Arthur Lambert
- 1864–1865: Col. Edward George Wynyard
- 1865–1875: Col. Michael Bruce
- 1875–1877: Col. William Henry Beaumont de Horsey
- 1877–1877: Col. George Wentworth Alexander Higginson
- 1877–1880: Col. Edwyn Sherard Burnaby
- 1880–1880: Col. Charles Napier Sturt
- 1880–1885: Col. Edward Henry Clive
- 1885–1886: Col. Philip Smith
- 1886–1889: Col. the Hon. William S. D. Home
- 1889–1894: Col. Henry Trotter
- 1894–1899: Col. Laurence James Oliphant
- 1899–1899: Col. the Hon. Herbert F. Eaton
- 1899–1904: Col. Horace Ricardo
- 1904–1908: Col. the Lord St Levan
- 1908–1910: Col. Robert G. Gordon-Gilmour
- 1910–1914: Col. Robert Scott-Kerr
- 1914–1914: Col. Robert G. Gordon-Gilmour
- 1914–1919: Col. Sir Henry Streatfeild
- 1919–1919: Col. Charles E. Corkran
- 1919–1923: Col. Gilbert C. Hamilton
- 1923–1927: Col. Bertram N. Sergison-Brooke
- 1927–1930: Col. Lord Henry C. Seymour
- 1930–1932: Col. the Viscount Gort
- 1932–1937: Col. Guy E. C. Rasch
- 1937–1939: Col. Charles R. Britten
- 1939– : Col. Mark E. Makgill-Crichton-Maitland
- 1959–1961: Col. Alexander M. H. Gregory-Hood
- 1961–1964: Col. Anthony G. Way
- 1964–1966: Col. Francis J. Jefferson
- 1966–1969: Col. Alan N. Breitmeyer
- 1969–1970: Col. Peter G. A. Prescott
- 1970–1973: Col. David W. Hargreaves
- 1973–1976: Col. Nicholas Hales-Pakenham-Mahon
- 1976–1978: Col. Greville W. Tufnell
- 1978–1980: Col. David V. Fanshawe
- 1980–1982: Col. David H. C. Gordon-Lennox
- 1982–1986: Col. Andrew T. W. Duncan
- 1986–1987: Lt.-Col. Alexander Heroys
- 1987–1995: Maj.-Gen. Bernard C. Gordon-Lennox
- 1995–2000: Maj.-Gen. Sir Evelyn J. Webb-Carter
- 2000–2006: Col. Edward T. Bolitho
- 2007–2012: Brig. David J. H. Maddan
- 2012–2017: Lieut.-Gen. Sir George P. R. Norton
- 2017–2022: Lieut.-Gen. C. Roland V. Walker
- 2022–present: Maj.-Gen. James M. H. Bowder

== Marches ==
"The British Grenadiers"
"The British Grenadiers", the official Regimental Quick March of the Grenadier Guards, performed by the United States Army Band Strings ensemble

The Grenadier Guards Regimental Slow March is the march "Scipio", from the opera Scipione by George Frideric Handel, inspired by the exploits of the Roman General Scipio Africanus. The first performance of Scipione was in 1726. Handel actually composed the eponymous slow march for the First Guards, presenting it to the regiment before he added it to the score of the opera. The Quick March is "The British Grenadiers".

== Uniform ==
Full dress uniform of the Grenadier Guards worn on ceremonial occasions as in the Household Division includes a tall and heavy fur cap, called bearskin with a white plume worn on the left side of the bearskin.

== Alliances ==
- Royal Navy – HMS Illustrious (until 2014)
- Royal Navy – HMS Queen Elizabeth
- Canada – The Canadian Grenadier Guards
- Australia – 1st Battalion, Royal Australian Regiment
- City of London – Worshipful Company of Ironmongers

== Lineage ==
Lineage
1st Regiment of Foot Guards (later Grenadier Guards)	The Royal Regiment of Guards
1st Regiment of Foot Guards (later Grenadier Guards)	John Russell's Regiment of Guards

== Order of precedence ==
The Grenadier Guards is the most senior regiment of the Infantry in the British Army

Preceded by First in Order of Precedence	Infantry Order of Precedence	Succeeded by Coldstream Guards

== See also ==
- George Higginson
- Military history of the United Kingdom
- British Army
- Canadian Grenadier Guards

== Notes ==
Footnotes

Citations
