= John Russell's Regiment of Guards =

John Russell's Regiment of Guards (later called the King's Royal Regiment of Guards) was an English infantry regiment formed following the Restoration of King Charles II to the throne in 1660.

The regiment served as a second regiment of foot guards, mirroring the form and function of Lord Wentworth's Regiment. It was commanded by John Russell. Upon the death of Lord Wentworth in 1665, the two regiments were amalgamated into the 1st Regiment of Foot Guards.
