= George White-Thomas =

English politician (1750–1821)

George White-Thomas (1750 – 24 June 1821) was a British politician and the Member of Parliament for Chichester from 1784 to 1812.

== See also ==
- List of MPs in the first United Kingdom Parliament
