= James Wilson (MP for York) =

Member of Parliament for York
- In office 1826–1830
- Preceded by: Robert Chaloner; Marmaduke Wyvill
- Succeeded by: Samuel Adlam Bayntun; Hon. Thomas Dundas

James Wilson was one of two Members of the Parliament of the United Kingdom for the constituency of York from 1826 to 1830.

== Life and politics ==
There are very few records of the life of James Wilson prior to 1820 when he came to public notice with the purchase of Sneaton Manor, which he rebuilt as Sneaton Castle, near Whitby. His account to Parliament of his prior life included claims to Army service in the West Indies and inheriting an estate on St.Vincent.

He was returned unopposed as the Tory MP for York in 1826. According to Parliamentary records, he was quite vocal in the chamber and lobbied well for his constituency and of his resident town of Whitby.

He died in September 1830, leaving his estate to his daughter, Mary. However, he died with many debts and his St Vincent estates were used as a partial repayment.

Political offices
Preceded by Robert Chaloner; Marmaduke Wyvill	Member of Parliament; 1826-1830	Next: Samuel Adlam Bayntun; Hon. Thomas Dundas
