= Robert Dundas (British Army officer, born 1780) =

British politician and military officer (1780–1844)

Lieutenant-General Sir Robert Dundas KCB
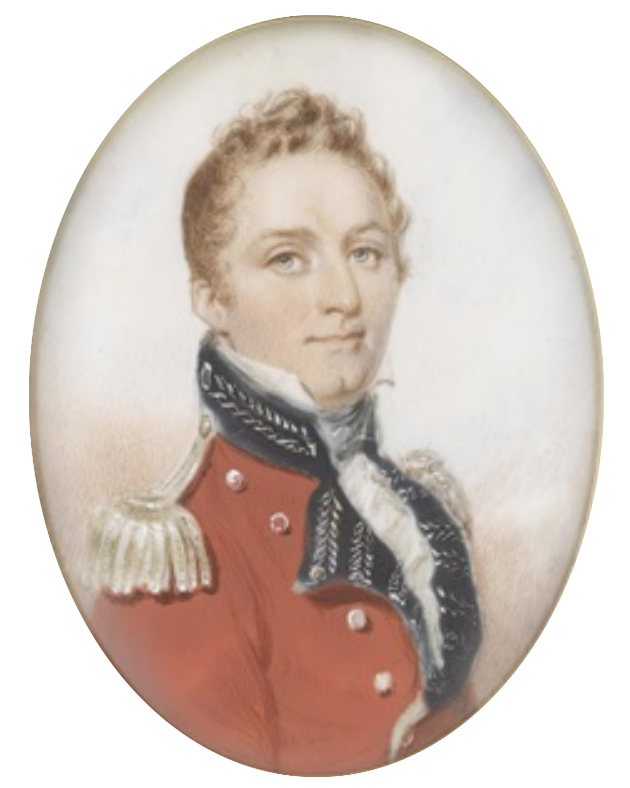
- Born: Robert Lawrence Dundas; 27 July 1780; Middlesex, England
- Died: 23 November 1844 (aged 64); Loftus, Yorkshire, England
- Relatives: Thomas, 1st Lord Dundas (father); Lawrence, 1st Earl of Zetland (brother); Charles Lawrence Dundas (brother); G. H. L. Dundas (brother)
- Military career
- Allegiance: Kingdom of Great Britain; United Kingdom
- Branch: British Army
- Service years: 1797–1844
- Rank: Lieutenant-General
- Conflicts: Anglo-Russian invasion of Holland; Peninsular War
- Awards: Army Gold Cross; Knight of the Order of the Tower and Sword; Knight Commander of the Order of the Bath

Lieutenant-General Sir Robert Lawrence Dundas KCB (27 July 1780 – 23 November 1844) was a British Whig and military commander during the Peninsular War. He was a Member of Parliament in the House of Commons representing Malton from 1807 to 1812, East Retford from 1826 to 1827, and Richmond from 1828 to 1834 and from 1839 to 1841.

== Early life and family ==
Dundas was born in Middlesex, the seventh son of Thomas Dundas and Lady Charlotte Fitzwilliam. His grandfathers were Sir Lawrence Dundas, 1st Baronet and William Fitzwilliam, 3rd Earl Fitzwilliam. His father succeeded to the baronetcy in 1781 and in 1794 was raised to the peerage as Baron Dundas. His elder brothers were Lawrence Dundas, 1st Earl of Zetland (1766–1839), Charles Lawrence Dundas (1771–1810), and Rear Admiral George Heneage Lawrence Dundas (1778–1834).

== Career ==
Dundas entered the British Army on 1 December 1797 as a second lieutenant. He served as an engineer officer in the Anglo-Russian invasion of Holland. He became lieutenant in 1800 and the following year he served in Egypt against the French campaign, including the Battle of Alexandria. He was promoted to captain in 1802 and major in 1804. In 1805, he served in the north of Germany with the Royal Staff Corps.

During the Peninsular War, he saw action at the Battles of Talavera (1809), Buçaco (1810), Fuentes de Oñoro (1811), Salamanca (1812), Vitoria (1813), the Pyrenees (1813), the Nivelle (1813), the Nive (1813), and Toulouse (1814).

For his services in the Peninsular War, he received the Army Gold Medal with Gold Cross and three clasps and was appointed a Knight of the Portuguese Order of the Tower and Sword in 1814 and a Knight Commander of the Order of the Bath (KCB) in 1815.

Dundas was promoted to Lieutenant-Colonel in 1811, full Colonel in 1821, Major-General in 1830 and Lieutenant-General in 1841. In June 1840, he was made colonel of the 59th (2nd Nottinghamshire) Regiment of Foot.

== Personal life ==
Dundas was unmarried. He died at his home at Loftus Hall in Yorkshire, aged 64.

Parliament of the United Kingdom
Preceded by Viscount Milton; Bryan Cooke	Member of Parliament for Malton; 1807–1812; With: The Lord Headley (1807–1808); Bryan Cooke (1808–1812)	Succeeded by John Ramsden; Viscount Duncannon
Preceded by William Evans; Samuel Crompton	Member of Parliament for East Retford; 1826–1827; With: William Battie-Wrightson	Succeeded by Viscount Newark; Arthur Duncombe
Preceded by Hon. Thomas Dundas; Samuel Moulton Barrett	Member of Parliament for Richmond (Yorkshire); 1828–1835; With: Hon. Thomas Dundas (1828–1830); Hon. John Dundas (1830–1835)	Succeeded by Alexander Speirs; Hon. Thomas Dundas
Preceded by Alexander Speirs; Hon. Thomas Dundas	Member of Parliament for Richmond (Yorkshire); 1839–1841; With: Alexander Speirs (1839–1841); Hon. George Wentworth-FitzWilliam (1841–1841)	Succeeded by Hon. Thomas Dundas
Military offices
Preceded by Sir Frederick Philipse Robinson	Colonel of the 59th (2nd Nottinghamshire) Regiment of Foot; 1840–1844	Succeeded by Sir John Harvey
