= William Ridley-Colborne =

British politician (1814-1846)

Member of Parliament for Richmond
- In office 1841–1846 Serving with John Dundas
- Preceded by: Sir Robert Lawrence Dundas; George Wentworth-FitzWilliam
- Succeeded by: Henry Rich; John Dundas

Personal details
- Born: 24 July 1814
- Died: 28 March 1846 (aged 31)
- Party: Whig
- Parents: Nicholas Ridley-Colborne (father); Charlotte Steele (mother)
- Relatives: Sir Matthew White Ridley (paternal grandfather); Thomas Steele (maternal grandfather)

The Hon. William Ridley-Colborne (24 July 1814 – 28 March 1846) was a British politician, who represented Richmond from 1841 until his death in 1846.

Ridley-Colborne was born in 1814, the only son of the politician Nicholas Ridley-Colborne and his wife Charlotte (née Steele). His grandfathers, Sir Matthew White Ridley, 2nd Baronet, and Thomas Steele, were both also Members of Parliament. He became heir to a title when his father was created Baron Colborne in 1839.

In the 1841 general election he was elected as a Whig for Richmond, There had been some local opposition to his nomination, and a rumour that the seat was being held open by its patron as a safe seat for Lord John Russell should he be defeated in London, but in the event he was returned along with John Dundas, a fellow Whig, in an unopposed election. Other than a by-election to fill a vacancy in 1839, the seat had not been contested for over a century, and was dominated by the Dundas family.

In Parliament, Ridley-Colborne voted against repeal of the Corn Laws. He died in office after a sudden illness at the age of 31, on 28 March 1846.
