= Lawrence Dundas, 1st Marquess of Zetland =

British Conservative statesman

The Most Honourable The Marquess of Zetland KT PC JP DL
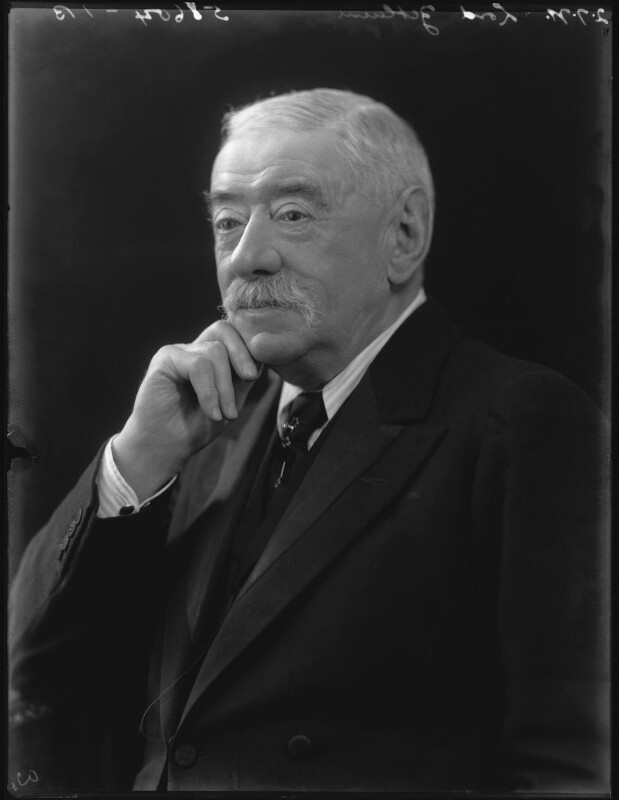

Lord Lieutenant of Ireland
- In office 30 July 1889 – 18 August 1892
- Monarch: Victoria
- Prime Minister: The Marquess of Salisbury
- Preceded by: The Marquess of Londonderry
- Succeeded by: The Lord Houghton

Personal details
- Born: 16 August 1844 London
- Died: 11 March 1929 (aged 84) Aske Hall, Yorkshire
- Party: Liberals; Conservative
- Spouse: Lady Lilian Lumley (m. 1871)
- Parents: John Dundas (father); Margaret Matilda Talbot (mother)
- Relatives: Lawrence John Lumley Dundas (son); John Dundas (brother)
- Education: Harrow School
- Alma mater: Trinity College, Cambridge

Lawrence Dundas, 1st Marquess of Zetland, KT, PC, JP, DL (16 August 1844 – 11 March 1929), known as Lawrence Dundas until 1873 and as the Earl of Zetland from 1873 to 1892, was a British hereditary peer and Conservative statesman. He was Lord Lieutenant of Ireland between 1889 and 1892.

== Early life and education ==
Lord Zetland was born in London, the son of John Charles Dundas, younger son of Lawrence Dundas, 1st Earl of Zetland (Zetland is an archaic spelling of Shetland). His mother was Margaret Matilda, daughter of James Talbot (1794-1852). He was educated at Harrow and Trinity College, Cambridge.

== Military service ==
Zetland was commissioned as a Cornet in the Royal Horse Guards in 1866. By 1869 Zetland was a Lieutenant and he retired from the army in 1872.

== Political career ==
In 1872 Zetland was elected Member of Parliament (MP) for Richmond, North Yorkshire that same year. However, he sat in the House of Commons for less than a year before succeeding his uncle as third Earl of Zetland. A Lord in Waiting from May to September 1880, Lord Zetland subsequently moved from supporting the Liberals to joining the Conservative Party in 1884. In 1889 he was sent to Ireland as Lord Lieutenant. The same year he was appointed a Knight of the Order of Saint Patrick (KP). In the post he proved both successful and popular, and remained there until the Liberals returned to power in 1892. He was sworn of the Privy Council in 1889 and in 1892, on Lord Salisbury's recommendation, he was created Earl of Ronaldshay, in the County of Orkney and Zetland, and Marquess of Zetland.

In the 1890s Lord Zetland became more involved in local politics, becoming an alderman on the North Riding of Yorkshire County Council in 1894 and being elected Mayor of Richmond in 1895 and 1896. In 1900 he was made a Knight of the Thistle. A freemason like his uncle and grandfather, Zetland was the society's provincial Grand Master in the North and East Riding of Yorkshire from 1874 to 1923. He was also an enthusiastic sportsman, and was Master of the Zetland Hunt for thirty-five years.

He owned 68,000 acres, with 11,000 in the North Riding of Yorkshire, 29,000 acres in Orkney and 13,000 acres in Shetland.

== Marriage and children ==
Lord Zetland married Lady Lilian Selina Elizabeth Lumley (1851 - 24 December 1943), daughter of Richard Lumley, 9th Earl of Scarbrough, on 3 August 1871. They had five children:

1. Lady Hilda Mary Dundas (24 November 1872 - 19 May 1957), married Charles Henry FitzRoy, 4th Baron Southampton on 9 July 1892.
2. Thomas Dundas, Lord Dundas (19 January 1874 - 11 February 1874)
3. Lawrence John Lumley Dundas, 2nd Marquess of Zetland (11 June 1876 - 6 February 1961)
4. Lady Maud Frederica Elizabeth Dundas (9 July 1877 - 15 March 1967), married William Wentworth-Fitzwilliam, 7th Earl Fitzwilliam on 24 June 1896.
5. Lord George Heneage Lawrence Dundas (1 July 1882 - 30 September 1968), married Iris Winifred Hanley on 23 December 1905.

== Death ==
Lord Zetland died in 1929 at the age of 84 at Aske Hall, Yorkshire and was buried there. He was succeeded in the marquessate and other titles by his eldest surviving son Lawrence. The Dowager Marchioness of Zetland died on 24 December 1943.

== Arms ==
Coat of arms of Lawrence Dundas, 1st Marquess of Zetland
Coronet A Coronet of a Marquess Crest A Lion's Head affrontée struggling through an Oak Bush all proper fructed Or crowned with an Antique Crown of the last Escutcheon Argent a Lion rampant within a Double Tressure flory counter-flory all within a Bordure Azure Supporters On either side a Lion proper crowned with an Antique Crown Or and gorged with a Chaplet of Oak leaves Vert fructed Gold with a Shield pendent from each, the dexter being charged with Argent a Saltire and Chief Gules on a Canton of the field a Lion rampant Azure for Bruce, and the sinister being charged with lozengy Argent and Gules for Fitzwilliam Motto Essayez (Try)

== Notes ==
Parliament of the United Kingdom
Preceded by Sir Roundell Palmer	Member of Parliament for Richmond; 1872 – 1873	Succeeded by John Dundas
Political offices
Preceded by The Earl of Dunmore	Lord-in-waiting; 1880	Succeeded by The Earl of Dalhousie
Preceded by The Marquess of Londonderry	Lord Lieutenant of Ireland; 1889 – 1892	Succeeded by The Lord Houghton
Peerage of the United Kingdom
New creation	Marquess of Zetland; 1892 – 1929	Succeeded by Lawrence Dundas
Preceded by Thomas Dundas	Earl of Zetland; 1873 – 1929	Succeeded by Lawrence Dundas
