= Alexander Speirs =

Scottish politician

Alexander Speirs (died 5 October 1844) was a Scottish politician who sat in the House of Commons from 1835 to 1841.

Speirs was the son of Archibald Speirs and his wife Margaret Dundas, daughter of Thomas Dundas, 1st Baron Dundas.

In 1835 Speirs was elected member of parliament for Richmond. He held the seat until 1841. He was Lord-Lieutenant of Renfrewshire from 8 August 1838 until his death.

Speirs married in 1836 Eliza Stewart Hagart, daughter of Thomas C. Hagart of Bantaskine and his wife Miss Stewart "of the Field" a well-known Glasgow beauty. Their son Archibald Alexander Speirs was MP for Renfrewshire and their daughter Eliza married Colonel Alexander of Ballochmyle, M.P. for Ayrshire.

Parliament of the United Kingdom
Preceded by John Dundas; Robert Lawrence Dundas	Member of Parliament for Richmond; 1835–1841; With: Hon. Thomas Dundas to 1839; Robert Lawrence Dundas from 1839	Succeeded by Robert Lawrence Dundas; George Wentworth-FitzWilliam
Honorary titles
Preceded by Archibald Campbell	Lord Lieutenant of Renfrewshire; 1838–1844	Succeeded by The Earl of Glasgow
