= Mark Masterman-Sykes =

English landowner, politician and book collector

Sir Mark Masterman-Sykes, 3rd Baronet (20 August 1771 – 16 February 1823), born Mark Sykes, was an English landowner and politician, known as a book-collector.

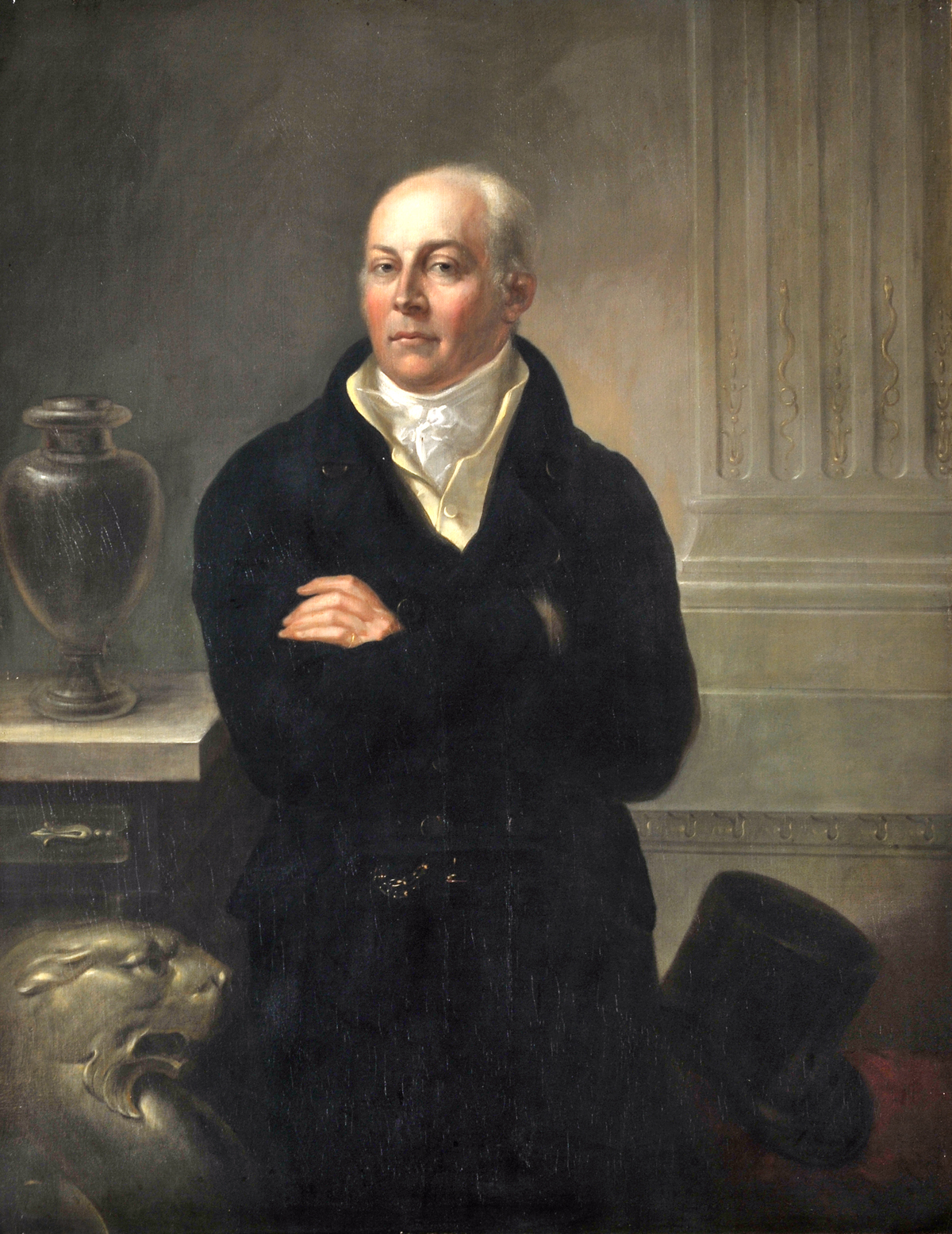
Sir Mark Masterman-Sykes

== Life ==
He was eldest son of Sir Christopher Sykes, 2nd Baronet of Sledmere House, Yorkshire, by his wife Elizabeth (d. 1803), daughter of William Tatton of Withenshaw, Cheshire. He matriculated at Brasenose College, Oxford, on 10 May 1788. In 1795 he served as High Sheriff of Yorkshire, and in September 1801 succeeded on the death of his father to the baronetcy and estates.

On 14 May 1807 Sykes was returned Member of Parliament for the city of York, and retained his seat until 1820, when he retired on account of ill health. He died without issue at Weymouth, and was succeeded by his brother, Sir Tatton Sykes, 4th Baronet.

== Collector ==
Sykes was famous as a bibliophile, and possessed a major private library, rich in editiones principes, incunabula, and Elizabethan poetry. There were manuscripts, including a copy of William Dugdale's Heraldic Visitation of York, 1665–1666. The editio princeps of Livy, by Arnold Pannartz and Konrad Sweynheim (Rome, 1469), with painted arms of the Borgia family, is the only copy on vellum extant, and after Sykes's death passed to Thomas Grenville who bequeathed it to the British Museum. A catalogue of the library was prepared by Henry John Todd. He also owned a Gutenberg Bible that is now in the Morgan Library.

Sykes was a member of the Roxburghe Club, to which he presented a reprint of some of John Lydgate's poems in 1818. He also collected pictures, bronzes, coins, medals, and prints (with a complete set of Francesco Bartolozzi's engravings, comprising his proofs and etchings). All his collections were dispersed by sale in 1824. His library fetched nearly £10,000, and his pictures nearly £6,000.

== Family ==
Sykes was twice married: firstly, on 11 November 1795, to Henrietta, daughter and heiress of Henry Masterman of Settrington, Yorkshire, on which occasion he took the additional name of Masterman; she died in July 1813. On 2 August 1814 he married, secondly, Mary Elizabeth, daughter of William Tatton Egerton and sister of Wilbraham Tatton Egerton of Tatton Park; she survived him, dying in October 1846.

== Notes ==
Parliament of the United Kingdom
| Preceded by Lawrence Dundas; Sir William Mordaunt Milner | Member of Parliament for York; 1807–1820; With: Sir William Mordaunt Milner | Succeeded by Lawrence Dundas; Marmaduke Wyvill |
Baronetage of Great Britain
| Preceded by Christopher Sykes | Baronet (of Sledmere); 1801–1823 | Succeeded by Tatton Sykes |

Attribution

This article incorporates text from a publication now in the public domain: Lee, Sidney, ed. (1898). "Sykes, Mark Masterman". Dictionary of National Biography. Vol. 55. London: Smith, Elder & Co.
