= Samuel Adlam Bayntun =

British politician ((c.1803–1833)

Member of Parliament for York
- In office 1830–1833
- Preceded by: James Wilson; Marmaduke Wyvill
- Succeeded by: Hon. Thomas Dundas; Hon. Edward Robert Petre

Personal details
- Born: c. 1803
- Died: September 1833 London, England

Military service
- Branch/service: Army
- Rank: Lieutenant
- Unit: 1 Dragoon Guards (1826); 1 Life Guards (1828)

Samuel Adlam Bayntun (c. 1803 – September 1833) was one of two Members of the Parliament of the United Kingdom for the constituency of York from 1830 to 1833.

== Life and politics ==
Bayntun was the eldest son of the Rev Henry Bayntun of Bromham, near Devizes in Wiltshire and his mother, Lucy Adlam. He was educated at Westminster School and graduated from Pembroke College, Oxford in 1821. He served in the Army between 1826 and 1832 in the 1st Battalion Dragoon Guards and 1st Battalion Life Guards achieving the rank of Lieutenant. It was while he stationed in York that he expressed his willingness to stand for election as a Tory. He identified himself as strongly Protestant though his activities in the Commons saw him back more "liberal" policies. He was an advocate for parliamentary reform, reduction in public expenditure and taxation, reform of the Church and amendment to the corn laws.

Money problems with the treasurer of his election committee led him to not be selected to contest re-election in 1833 amid rumours of heavy debt.

Bayntun died in September 1833 of scarlet fever at the age of 30.

Political offices
Preceded by James Wilsom; Marmaduke Wyvill	Member of Parliament; 1830 - 1833	Next: Hon. Thomas Dundas; Hon. Edward Robert Petre
