= George Wentworth-FitzWilliam =

British politician (1817-1874)

Member of Parliament for Richmond
- In office 1841–1841 Serving with Sir Robert Dundas
- Preceded by: Alexander Speirs; Sir Robert Dundas
- Succeeded by: Hon. John Dundas; William Ridley-Colborne

Member of Parliament for Peterborough
- In office 1841–1857 Serving with Sir Robert Heron, Bt (1841–1847); Hon. William Cavendish (1847–1852); Hon. Richard Watson (1852); George Hammond Whalley (1852–1853); Thomson Hankey (1853–1857)
- Preceded by: Sir Robert Heron, Bt; John Nicholas Fazakerley
- Succeeded by: Thomson Hankey; George Hammond Whalley

Personal details
- Born: 3 May 1817
- Died: 4 March 1874 (aged 56)
- Party: Whig
- Spouse: Alice Louisa Anson (m. 1865)
- Parents: Charles Wentworth-Fitzwilliam (father); Hon. Mary Dundas (mother)
- Relatives: William Charles Wentworth-Fitzwilliam (brother); William Thomas Wentworth-Fitzwillam (brother); Charles Wentworth-Fitzwilliam (brother); Thomas Wentworth-Fitzwilliam (grandson); Maj Gen George Anson (father-in-law); Admiral Francis Bridgeman (nephew); William Wentworth-Fitzwilliam (nephew); Henry Wentworth-FitzWilliam (nephew); Mary Wentworth-Fitzwilliam (niece); Charles Wentworth-Fitzwilliam (nephew); John Wentworth-FitzWilliam (nephew)

The Hon. George Wentworth-FitzWilliam (3 May 1817 – 4 March 1874), was a British politician.

== Background ==
Wentworth-FitzWilliam was a younger son of Charles Wentworth-FitzWilliam, 5th Earl FitzWilliam, and Mary, daughter of Thomas Dundas, 1st Baron Dundas. William Wentworth-FitzWilliam, 6th Earl FitzWilliam and Charles Wentworth-FitzWilliam were his brothers.

== Political career ==
Wentworth-FitzWilliam was Member of Parliament (MP) for Richmond in 1841 and for Peterborough between 1841 and 1859. He served as High Sheriff of Northamptonshire for 1866.

== Family ==
Wentworth-FitzWilliam married Alice Louisa, daughter of the Hon. George Anson, in 1865. They had several children, including George Charles FitzWilliam, father of Thomas Wentworth-Fitzwilliam, the 10th and last Earl Fitzwilliam. Wentworth-Fitzwilliam died in March 1874, aged 56. His wife survived him by five years and died in January 1879.

Parliament of the United Kingdom
Preceded by Alexander Speirs; Sir Robert Dundas	Member of Parliament for Richmond; 1841; With: Sir Robert Dundas	Succeeded by Hon. John Dundas; William Ridley-Colborne
Preceded by Sir Robert Heron, Bt; John Nicholas Fazakerley	Member of Parliament for Peterborough; 1841–1859; With: Sir Robert Heron, Bt 1841–1847; Hon. William Cavendish 1847–1852; Hon. Richard Watson 1852; George Hammond Whalley 1852–1853; Thomson Hankey 1853–1857	Succeeded by Thomson Hankey; George Hammond Whalley
