= Listed buildings in Aske, North Yorkshire =

Aske is a civil parish in the county of North Yorkshire, England. It contains 19 listed buildings that are recorded in the National Heritage List for England. Of these, two are listed at Grade I, the highest of the three grades, one is at Grade II*, the middle grade, and the others are at Grade II, the lowest grade. The most important building in the parish is Aske Hall, which is listed, and most of the other listed buildings are associated with it. These include structures close to the hall, including a stable block, and buildings in and around the park, including follies, lodges, gateways and a bridge. The other listed buildings are a milepost and a boundary marker.

== Key ==
Grade	Criteria
I	Buildings of exceptional interest, sometimes considered to be internationally important
II*	Particularly important buildings of more than special interest
II	Buildings of national importance and special interest

== Buildings ==
Name and location	Photograph	Date	Notes	Grade
Aske Hall; 54.42567°N 1.72778°W		15th century	The house has been altered and extended through the centuries. It originated as a tower house, later extended to form a manor house, and then a country house, which was reduced in the 20th century. It is built in sandstone with roofs of Westmorland slate. There is an irregular plan, a U-shaped front with a hall and wings, a pele tower in the right corner and a Gothic tower in the left corner, and later ranges. In the centre is a canted porch with rusticated banding, and a doorway with an architrave, a keystone and a cornice. The windows are sashes, most with keystones, and at the top is a parapet with a moulded cornice and a coat of arms. In the left return is a Venetian window.	I
The Temple; 54.42732°N 1.73251°W		c. 1745	A folly designed by Daniel Garrett in Gothick style. It is in stone and has an irregular plan, consisting of a three-storey octagonal tower with a rear projecting spiral stair turret, between two lower flanking square towers with rounded projecting turrets to the front, all set behind a single-storey bastion. Along the front is an arcade of pointed arches, above which is a coved cornice and a parapet with open strapwork. The central tower has a doorway with pilasters and crocketed finials, and sash windows with pointed heads and hood moulds, and at the top is an incomplete parapet. The outer towers have embattled parapets.	I
Coach House; 54.42651°N 1.72811°W	—	Mid 18th century	The coach house is in sandstone, with cornice bands, and a Westmorland slate roof, hipped in the centre and at the outer ends. It is in one and two storeys and has six bays, the middle two bays projecting. In each bay is a round-arched opening with a plinth, and an impost band. In the centre is a pedimented clock tower with a bell turret and a leaded cupola.	II
Olliver Ducket; 54.41432°N 1.71862°W		Mid 18th century	A folly in limestone with two storeys, the larger lower storey carrying a tower. The lower storey is circular with projections forming a Greek cross, containing oculi and a doorway with a pointed arch. The is also circular, containing four windows with trefoil heads, above which is a band and an embattled parapet.	II
Chapel Range; 54.42612°N 1.72747°W	—	1763	The stable range, which has been converted for other uses including a chapel, is in sandstone with a Westmorland slate roof. There are two storeys and a basement at the rear, and nine bays, with an apse for the chapel at the north end. The third and seventh bays project and rise to three-storey turrets, each with an oculus and a hipped roof. The north front has a plinth, a continuous arcade with archivolts and an impost band, a modillion cornice, and a balustraded parapet between the turrets. The doorway has an architrave, a four-light fanlight, a pulvinated frieze and a modillion cornice, and the windows are sashes.	II*
Wall and gate piers linking the Chapel Range with the Coach House; 54.42647°N 1.72769°W	—	c. 1763	The wall and gate piers were designed by John Carr, and are in sandstone. The wall has a plinth and interval piers, all coped, and attached to it is a trough. The two piers at the entrance to the chapel have bases, chamfered rusticated stonework, panelled pedestals and cornices. The piers at the entrance to the coach house have bases and a cornice band. All the piers have finials of a sphere set in a square.	II
Fish Pond Temple; 54.42505°N 1.72307°W		Mid to late 18th century	The garden temple in Aske Park is in sandstone with a stone slate roof. It consists of a tetrastyle prostyle temple with semicircular rear wall. On the front is a portico with Roman Doric columns carrying a Roman Doric frieze, and a pediment with the base for a finial. The entablature returns to half-columns, and the cornice is continued around the curving rear wall.	II
Old Water Tower; 54.42660°N 1.72841°W	—	Mid to late 18th century	The former water tower is in sandstone on a plinth, with a moulded cornice, and a hipped Westmorland slate roof. There are two storeys and a single cell. The tower contains a doorway with a lintel and a keystone, an upper floor doorway, and a blocked window with a lintel and a keystone.	II
Social Club; 54.42706°N 1.72803°W	—	Mid to late 18th century	A dairy, later used for other purposes, in sandstone on a plinth, with a hipped Westmorland slate roof. There is a single storey and three bays. It contains a doorway with a quoined surround and a keystone, above which is an oculus with an architrave, and the windows are round-arched sashes.	II
Summer House; 54.42594°N 1.72937°W	—	Mid to late 18th century	The summer house is in sandstone, and is in the form of a distyle prostyle temple. On the front are two Roman Doric columns flanked by half-columns carrying an Ionic entablature with a cornice, and a blocking course containing a blind balustrade in bas-relief. Inside, there is a shell niche, and a wooden seat with heart-shaped legs.	II
Aske Bridge; 54.42249°N 1.72289°W		Late 18th century	The bridge carries the B6274 road over Aske Beck. It is in sandstone, and consists of a single segmental arch. The bridge has an archivolt flanked by pilaster buttresses containing recessed shell niches, a band, and parapets with segmental coping, ending in circular bollards. On the buttresses, between the band and coping, are vermiculated paterae.	II
Low Lodge; 54.42956°N 1.71935°W	—	Late 18th century	The lodge is in sandstone on a plinth, with a hipped Westmorland slate roof. There is a single storey and three bays. In the centre is a distyle Roman Doric pedimented portico in antis with a frieze containing paterae. This is flanked by sash windows.	II
Gateway south of Low Lodge; 54.42944°N 1.71925°W		Late 18th century	The entrance to the grounds is flanked by two pairs of square sandstone gate piers, all with chamfered rusticated quoins, cornices and pyramidal caps. The inner piers are taller, the quoins are vermiculated, and they have a blocking course with festoons. They are flanked by screen walls, each containing a round-arched opening and an entablature, and are linked to the outer smaller piers. Between the central piers are wrought iron gates with spear finials.	II
High Lodges; 54.41776°N 1.72239°W		c. 1845	At the entrance to the grounds is a round sandstone archway with a vermiculated keystone, voussoirs, and decorated spandrels, flanked by Tuscan pilasters with vermiculated bands and lozenge panels, and a cornice on brackets. Outside this are curved screen walls containing interval pilasters with obelisk finials, vermiculated banding and cornices. The gates are in wrought iron and decorated with scrollwork. Behind is a pair of lodges, each with a single storey, an L-shaped plan, and a projecting gable wing. In the angle is a flat-roofed porch, each bay contains a three-light mullioned and transomed window in an architrave, flanking paired Tuscan pilasters, and a dated shield above.	II
Gateway northeast of Aske Hall; 54.42669°N 1.72586°W		Mid to late 19th century	The entrance is flanked by square sandstone gate piers, with vermiculated chamfered rustication, cornices and vase finials. The gates are in wrought iron with elaborate scroll decoration.	II
Gateway south of Aske Hall; 54.42372°N 1.72800°W	—	Mid to late 19th century	The entrance is flanked by square sandstone gate piers, with vermiculated chamfered rustication, cornices and vase finials. The gates are in wrought iron with elaborate scroll decoration.	II
Milepost opposite Low Lodge; 54.42925°N 1.71905°W		Late 19th century	The milepost on the east side of the B6274 road is in cast iron, and it has a triangular plan and a sloping top. On each side are pointing hands, on the left side is the distance to Richmond, on the right side is the distance to Lucy Cross, and on the top is an inscription.	II
Milepost at Richmond Boundary; 54.41370°N 1.72126°W		Late 19th century	The boundary marker on the west side of the B6274 road is in cast iron, and it has a triangular plan and a sloping top. On each side are pointing hands and inscriptions.	II
Stable Block; 54.42814°N 1.72495°W		1887	The stable block, designed by Thomas Oliver, is in sandstone with hipped Westmorland slate roofs. It is in one and two storeys, and forms a quadrangle, with a front range of 17 bays. In the centre is an entrance block of five bays containing a round-arched carriageway with a Tuscan surround, a vermiculated plinth, fluted pilasters, a moulded archivolt, spandrels decorated with foliage, and a dentilled cornice. This is flanked by five-bay wings, and at the ends are pavilions.	II
