= Aske, North Yorkshire =

Civil parish in North Yorkshire, England

Coordinates: 54.42573°N 1.72870°W

Aske
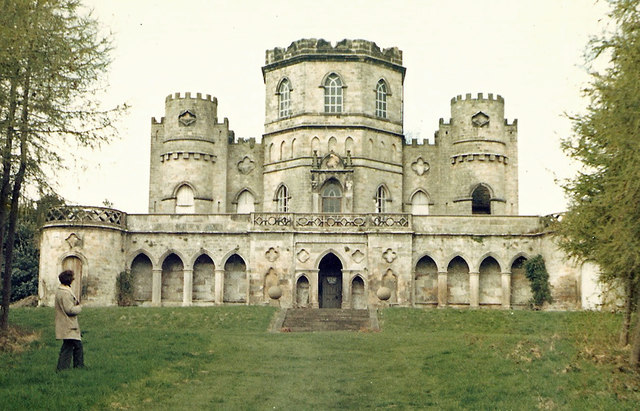
- Aske Hall Temple

- Location within North Yorkshire
- OS grid reference: NZ177034
- Unitary authority: North Yorkshire
- Ceremonial county: North Yorkshire
- Region: Yorkshire and the Humber
- Country: England
- Sovereign state: United Kingdom
- Post town: Richmond
- Postcode district: DL10
- Police: North Yorkshire
- Fire: North Yorkshire
- Ambulance: Yorkshire

Aske is a civil parish in North Yorkshire, England, about two miles north of Richmond.

The name Aske derives from the Old English æsc meaning 'ash tree'.

According to the 2001 census it had a population of 122, falling to less than 100 at the 2011 Census. From this date population information is included in the parish of Whashton. The parish includes the Grade I listed Aske Hall at grid reference NZ177034 which hosts both stables and an ornamental lake.

From 1974 to 2023 it was part of the district of Richmondshire, it is now administered by the unitary North Yorkshire Council.

In the early 1870s Aske was described as:

ASKE, a township in Easby parish, N. R. Yorkshire; 2½ miles N of Richmond. Acres, 1,670. Real property, £1,537. Pop., 140. Houses, 20. Aske Hall is the seat of the Earl of Zetland; belonged formerly to the Darcys; and commands a fine prospect up and down the Swale.

== See also ==
- Listed buildings in Aske, North Yorkshire
