= William Cavendish, 2nd Baron Chesham =

British politician (1815–1882)

The Right Honourable The Lord Chesham

Member of Parliament for Buckinghamshire
- In office 1857–1863 Serving with Caledon Du Pré; Benjamin Disraeli
- Preceded by: Caledon Du Pré; Benjamin Disraeli; Charles Compton Cavendish
- Succeeded by: Caledon Du Pré; Benjamin Disraeli; Robert Bateson Harvey

Member of Parliament for Peterborough
- In office 1847–1852 Serving with George Wentworth-FitzWilliam
- Preceded by: George Wentworth-FitzWilliam; John Nicholas Fazakerley
- Succeeded by: George Wentworth-FitzWilliam; Richard Watson

Personal details
- Born: William George Cavendish; 29 October 1815
- Died: 26 June 1882 (aged 66) Latimer, Buckinghamshire
- Party: Liberal
- Spouse: Henrietta Frances Lascelles (m. 1849)
- Relations: George Gordon, 9th Marquess of Huntly (grandfather)
- Children: 5
- Parent(s): Charles Compton Cavendish, 1st Baron Chesham; Lady Catherine Susan Gordon
- Education: Eton College

William George Cavendish, 2nd Baron Chesham (29 October 1815 – 26 June 1882) was a British Liberal politician.

== Early life ==
Chesham was born on 29 October 1815 into the Cavendish family, headed by the Duke of Devonshire. He was the eldest son of Charles Compton Cavendish, 1st Baron Chesham and the former Lady Catherine Susan Gordon. He had two younger sisters, Hon. Susan Sophia Cavendish (wife of Thomas Trevor, 22nd Baron Dacre) and Hon. Harriet Elizabeth Cavendish (second wife of George Byng, 2nd Earl of Strafford).

His father was the fourth son of George Cavendish, 1st Earl of Burlington (himself the third son of former Prime Minister William Cavendish, 4th Duke of Devonshire) and Lady Elizabeth Compton (only child of Charles Compton, 7th Earl of Northampton). His maternal grandparents were George Gordon, 9th Marquess of Huntly and the former Catherine Cope (second daughter and co-heiress of Sir Charles Cope, 2nd Baronet).

He was educated at Eton College.

== Career ==
From 1833 to 1840, Cavendish served as an officer in the 10th Light Dragoons. His father commissioned the famous architect Edward Blore to build a new family home, known as Latimer House, which was completed in 1838. After leaving the army, Cavendish served as a Lieutenant in the disembodied Royal Buckinghamshire Militia (King's Own), being promoted to Captain in 1846. After the militia was revived the Duke of Devonshire raised the 2nd Derbyshire Militia (Chatsworth Rifles) in 1855 and commissioned him as captain in the new regiment.

In 1847, he was elected as a Liberal Member of Parliament for Peterborough, a seat he held until 1852, and later represented Buckinghamshire, serving alongside Benjamin Disraeli from 1857 to 1863, when he succeeded his father in the barony and took his seat in the House of Lords. His father, a Member of Parliament for nearly forty years, had been created Baron Chesham of Chesham on 15 January 1858.

In 1876, he served as president of the Royal Agricultural Society.

== Personal life ==
On 24 July 1849, Lord Chesham married Henrietta Frances Lascelles (1830–1884) at Kensington Church in London. She was a daughter of Comptroller of the Household Right Hon. William Lascelles (third son of Henry Lascelles, 2nd Earl of Harewood) and his wife Lady Caroline Georgiana Howard (a daughter of George Howard, 6th Earl of Carlisle). Together, they were the parents of:

- Charles Compton William Cavendish, 3rd Baron Chesham (1850–1907), who married Lady Beatrice Constance Grosvenor, second daughter of Hugh Grosvenor, 1st Duke of Westminster and Lady Constance Sutherland-Leveson-Gower (fourth daughter of George Sutherland-Leveson-Gower, 2nd Duke of Sutherland). After his death, she married Maj. John Alexander Moncrieffe in 1910.
- Hon. Georgiana Caroline Cavendish (1852–1937), who married, as his second wife, Thomas Coke, 2nd Earl of Leicester, in 1875.
- Hon. Mary Susan Caroline Cavendish (1853–1937), who married Charles Lyttelton, 8th Viscount Cobham, in 1878.
- Hon. Katherine Caroline Cavendish (1857–1941), who married, as his second wife, Hugh Grosvenor, 1st Duke of Westminster, in 1882.
- Hon. William Edwin Cavendish (1862–1931), who married Elizabeth Janet Baillie, sister of Sir George Baillie, 3rd Baronet, in 1885.

Lord Chesham died in June 1882, aged 66, at Latimer House, Latimer, Buckinghamshire. He was succeeded in the barony by his eldest son Charles. His widow died nearly two years later on 21 May 1884.

Parliament of the United Kingdom
Preceded by George Wentworth-FitzWilliam; John Nicholas Fazakerley	Member of Parliament for Peterborough; 1847–1852; With: George Wentworth-FitzWilliam	Succeeded by George Wentworth-FitzWilliam; Richard Watson
Preceded by Caledon Du Pré; Benjamin Disraeli; Charles Compton Cavendish	Member of Parliament for Buckinghamshire; 1857–1863; With: Caledon Du Pré; Benjamin Disraeli	Succeeded by Caledon Du Pré; Benjamin Disraeli; Robert Bateson Harvey
Peerage of the United Kingdom
Preceded by Charles Compton Cavendish	Baron Chesham; 1863–1882	Succeeded by Charles Compton William Cavendish
