= Thomas Dundas, 1st Baron Dundas =

British politician

The Right Honourable The Lord Dundas FRS
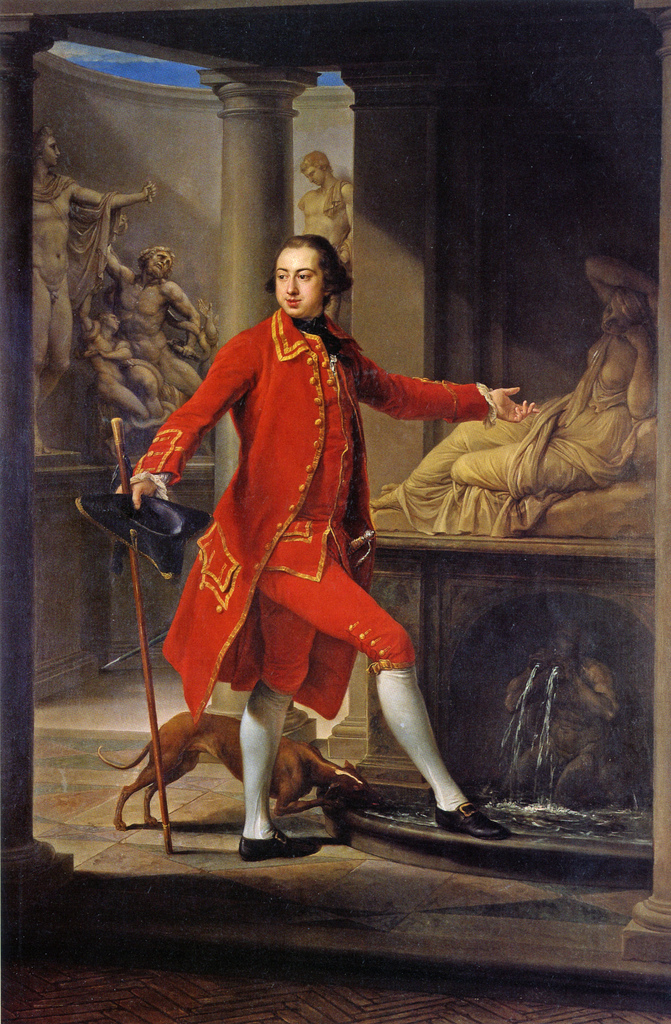

Member of Parliament for Richmond (Yorkshire)
- In office 1763–1768
- Preceded by: The Earl of Ancram; Sir Ralph Milbanke
- Succeeded by: Alexander Wedderburn; William Meeke

Member of Parliament for Stirlingshire
- In office 1768–1794
- Preceded by: James Campbell
- Succeeded by: Robert Graham

Personal details
- Born: 16 February 1741 Great Britain
- Died: 14 June 1820 (aged 79) Great Britain
- Spouse: Lady Charlotte FitzWilliam (m. 1764)
- Children: 14
- Parent: Sir Lawrence Dundas (father)
- Education: Eton College; St. Andrews University

Thomas Laurence Dundas, 1st Baron Dundas, FRS (16 February 1741 – 14 June 1820) was a British politician who represented Richmond and Stirlingshire in the House of Commons of Great Britain from 1763 to 1794, when he was raised to the peerage of Great Britain as Baron Dundas. He was responsible for commissioning the Charlotte Dundas, the world's "first practical steamboat".

== Biography ==
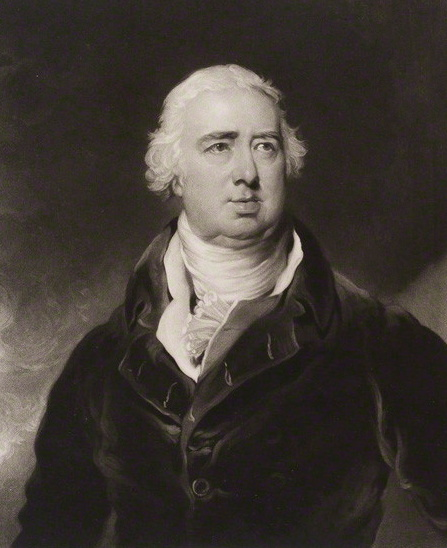
Lord Dundas

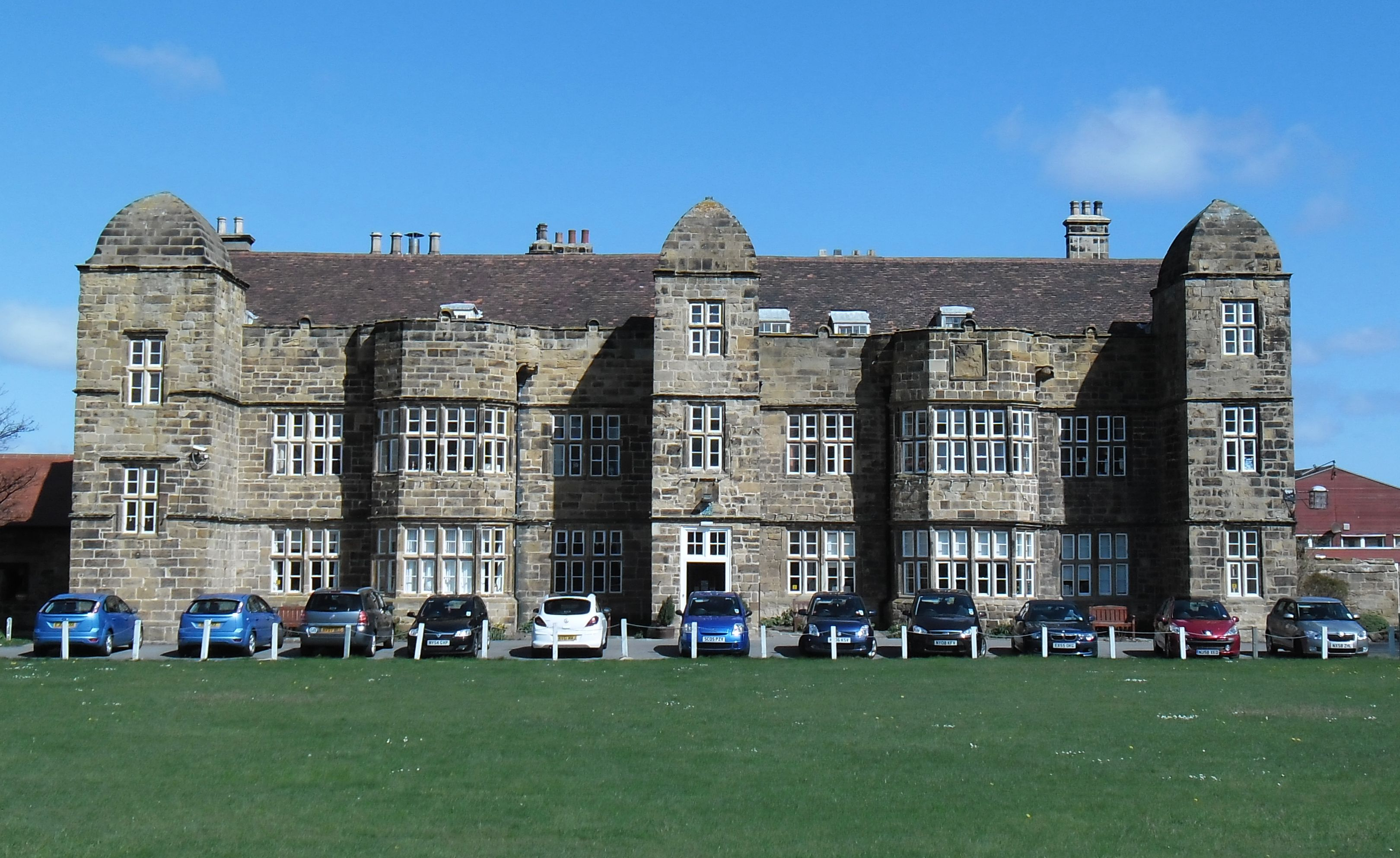
Marske Hall

Dundas was the only son of Sir Lawrence Dundas, 1st Baronet, the "Nabob of the North" and Margaret Bruce (1716-1802). Following education at Eton and St. Andrews University he did the Grand Tour, then became Member of Parliament for Richmond, 1763–1768, then for Stirlingshire, 1768–1794. He was elevated to the peerage as Baron Dundas of Aske in August 1794, and was also Lord Lieutenant and Vice Admiral of Orkney and Shetland, Councillor of state to the Prince of Wales (later George IV), President of the Society of Scottish Antiquaries and Colonel of the North York Militia. He acquired Marske Hall in North Yorkshire in 1762 after the death of Sir William Lowther, 3rd Baronet. He succeeded his father as 2nd Baronet in 1781, inheriting Aske Hall, also in North Yorkshire. Dundas also inherited policies from his father.

== Charlotte Dundas ==
Dundas followed his father in having an interest in Grangemouth and in the Forth and Clyde Canal, under construction from 1768 to 1790, and he would have been aware of the 1789 trials on the canal of Patrick Miller of Dalswinton's double-hulled paddle boat powered with a steam engine fitted by William Symington. In 1800 Dundas, as Governor of the Forth and Clyde Canal Company, engaged Symington to design a steam tug on the lines of a failed attempt by Captain John Schank for the Bridgewater Canal. At a meeting of the canal company's directors on 5 June 1800 Dundas "produced a model of a boat by Captain Schank to be worked by a steam engine by Mr Symington", and it was agreed this should be immediately put in hand.

The boat was built to Symington's design. It had successful trials on the River Carron in June 1801 and further trials towing sloops from the river Forth up the Carron and thence along the Forth and Clyde Canal. The other proprietors of the canal were concerned about wave damage to the canal banks, and the Committee decided that the boat would "by no means answer the purpose".

Symington had proposals for an improved boat which were presented in the form of a model, shown to Lord Dundas, of the boat which would become famous as the Charlotte Dundas, named in honour of one of his Lordship's daughters. One account states that Lord Dundas had advised Symington to prepare the model and bring it to his Lordship in London, where Symington was introduced to the Duke of Bridgewater who was enthusiastic enough to immediately order eight boats of similar construction for his canal. Unfortunately, the Duke of Bridgewater died a few days before the first sailing, and nothing came of this order.

Lord Dundas and some of his relatives and friends were on board for the first sailing of the boat on the canal in 1803, but despite the success of the Charlotte Dundas fears of erosion of the banks prevailed, and the trials were ended leaving Symington out-of-pocket.

== Family ==
Sir Thomas Dundas, 2nd Baronet married Lady Charlotte FitzWilliam, the daughter of William FitzWilliam, 3rd Earl FitzWilliam, on 24 May 1764 and they had 14 children:

- Lawrence Dundas, 1st Earl of Zetland (1766–1839)
- Anne Dundas (1767)
- Thomas Dundas (born 1768; died young)
- Lt-Col. William Lawrence Dundas (18 May 1770 – 1796), died in Santo Domingo
- Charles Lawrence Dundas (18 July 1771 – 25 January 1810), married Lady Caroline Beauclerk, daughter of Aubrey Beauclerk, 5th Duke of St Albans
- Margaret Dundas (9 November 1772 – 8 May 1852), married Archibald Spiers
- Charlotte Dundas (18 June 1774 – 5 January 1855), married Rev. William Wharton
- Thomas Lawrence Dundas (12 October 1775 – 17 March 1848)
- Frances Laura Dundas (24 May 1777 – 27 November 1844), married Robert Chaloner
- R-Adm. George Heneage Lawrence Dundas (1778–1834)
- Maj-Gen. Sir Robert Lawrence Dundas (27 July 1780 – 23 November 1844)
- Dorothy Dundas (August 1785 – December 1790)
- Mary Dundas (30 May 1787 – 1 November 1830), married Charles FitzWilliam, 5th Earl FitzWilliam
- Isabella Dundas (25 February 1790 – 6 December 1887), married John Charles Ramsden

Parliament of Great Britain
Preceded by The Earl of Ancram; Sir Ralph Milbanke	Member of Parliament for Richmond (Yorkshire); 1763–1768; With: Sir Ralph Milbanke	Succeeded by Alexander Wedderburn; Sir Lawrence Dundas
Preceded by James Campbell	Member of Parliament for Stirlingshire; 1768–1794	Succeeded by Robert Graham
Honorary titles
New office	Lord Lieutenant of Orkney and Shetland; 1794–1820	Vacant Title next held by The Lord Dundas
Preceded by Sir Lawrence Dundas	Vice Admiral of Orkney and Shetland; 1781–1820	Vacant Title next held by James Allan Maconochie
Peerage of Great Britain
New creation	Baron Dundas; 1794–1820	Succeeded by Lawrence Dundas
Baronetage of Great Britain
Preceded by Lawrence Dundas	Baronet (of Kerse); 1781–1820	Succeeded by Lawrence Dundas
