= Order of the Holy Paraclete =

Anglican religious community

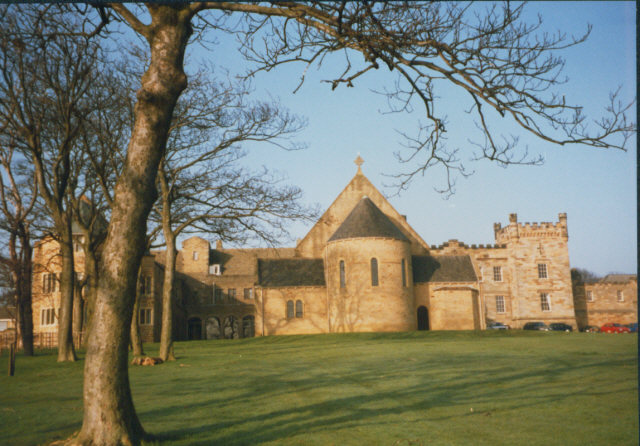
St Hilda's Priory, Whitby, where the Order was established in 1915

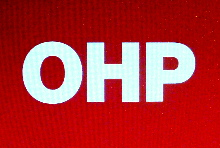
OHP logo

The Order of The Holy Paraclete (OHP) is an Anglican religious order. The community began in 1915, when it was founded by Margaret Cope (1886–1961) at the Mother House of St Hilda's Priory, Sneaton Castle, Whitby. A new priory was constructed in 2018 and Sneaton Castle was sold.

== History ==
Mother Margaret was a Novice with the Community of St Peter, Horbury, in 1914, when the announcement of the Great War meant that the Sisters decided to close St Hilda's School, the high school for girls which they had been running. While on rest at Rievaulx Abbey, she was inspired by the Holy Spirit to found a new educational Order, to continue the school. In January 1915, St Hilda's School re-opened at Sneaton Castle, Whitby, and the new Order was provisionally named The Society of the Holy Spirit.

The Archbishop of York at the time was Dr Cosmo Gordon Lang, who in July 1915 appointed Dr Walter Frere of the Community of the Resurrection as adviser to the Order. Fr Frere advised that there was already in existence in the USA an Order called The Society of the Holy Spirit, and suggested The Order of the Holy Paraclete.

The Rule and Constitution of the Order were formally accepted by Archbishop Lang by August 1917. The First Professions of the Order took place on 16 October 1917, followed by the first formal meeting of the Chapter, at which Fr Frere resigned as Spiritual Adviser and at which Mother Margaret was officially elected as the first Prioress of the Order. The installation of Mother Margaret as Prioress took place on the same day.

In 1919, the Order acquired a resident Chaplain, Rev G Healey, allowing for regular services in Chapel. This encouraged the building of a proper Chapel, as the room which was being used for this purpose is found at the top of the South Tower, accessible only by a stone spiral staircase. (The Chapel built at this time is now the refectory in the Sneaton Castle Centre.) This was the first of a number of building projects to extend the available space for both Sisters and pupils.

The Sisters who were in First Vows took their Life Professions on 2 July 1921.

The Rule and Constitution of the Order were finalised and authorised by the ecclesiastical authority of Archbishop William Temple in January 1930. Mother Margaret had sought help from Fr Lucius Carey of the Society of St John the Evangelist in finalising the legal document of the Constitution.

The Order first took on work outside of St Hilda's School in 1924. In 1926, the first Sisters travelled to the Gold Coast (Ghana), which was the start of the Order's work in Africa.

The Priory is named after St Hilda of Whitby, the patron saint of Whitby, who founded a monastery on the east cliff in 657. The Order also has houses elsewhere in Yorkshire, with Sisters in York and Redcar as well as St Oswald's Pastoral Centre in Sleights, near Whitby. The community describes itself as "active and contemplative", and follows the Benedictine tradition, following a regular pattern of monastic worship. The community has pioneered educational and medical work in Ghana from as early as 1926 and continues to do so today.

The Order of the Holy Paraclete's website states that it "greatly values the wide circle of friends which makes up its extended family" consisting of friends, associates and tertiaries.

Many of the nuns are now elderly, and the old priory building at Sneaton Castle could not easily be adapted for wheelchairs. As such, in 2018 a new modern priory was built next door to the old building, which was sold.

== Prioresses ==
- 2005-2015: Sister Dorothy Stella
- 2015-2019: Sister Carole
