= Sir William Milner, 3rd Baronet =

British Member of Parliament and Lord Mayor of York

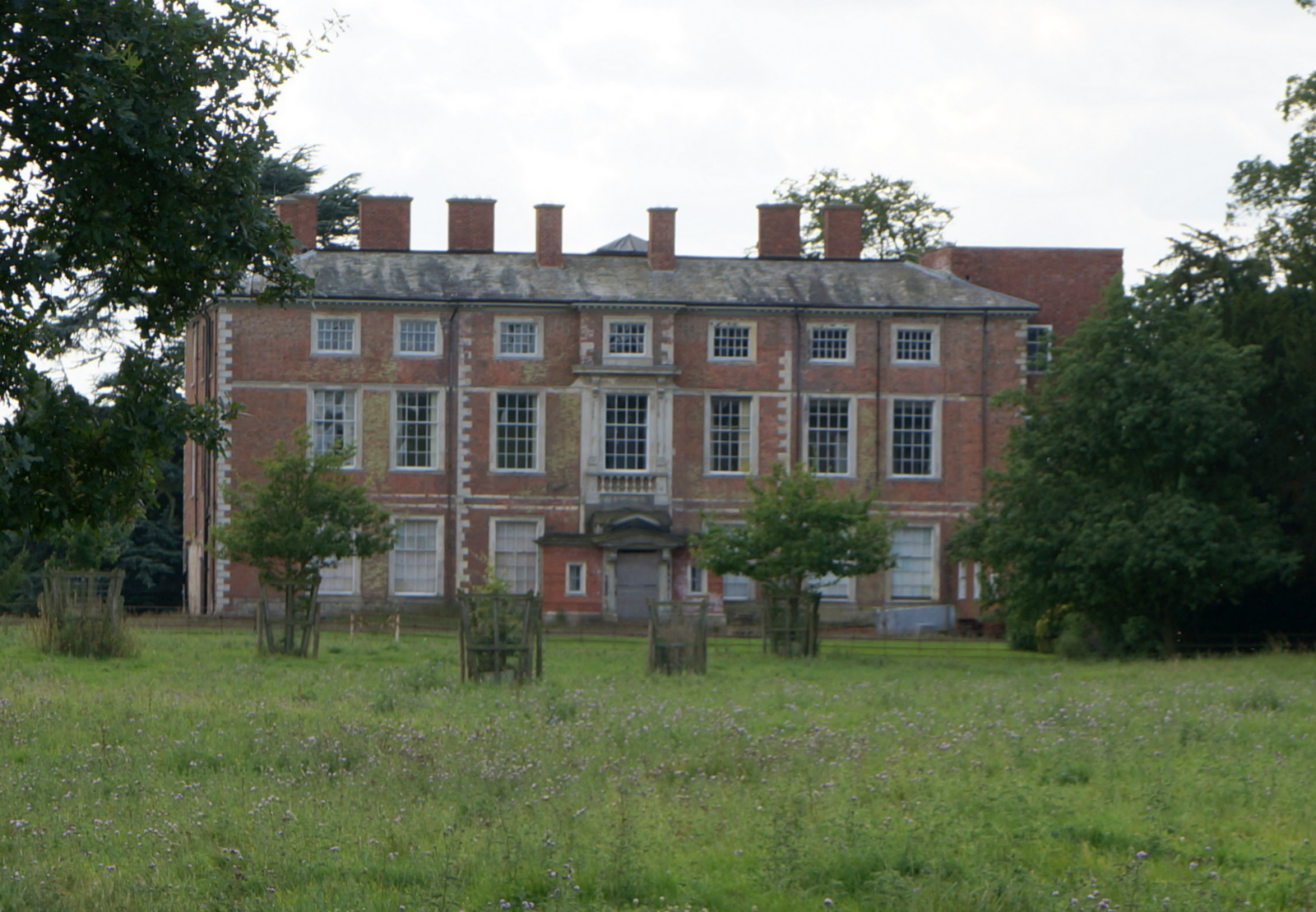
Nun Appleton Hall

Sir William Mordaunt Milner, 3rd Baronet (6 October 1754 – 9 September 1811) of Nun Appleton Hall, Yorkshire, was a British Member of Parliament and Lord Mayor of York.

He was the eldest surviving son of Sir William Milner, 2nd Baronet, of Nun Appleton by Elizabeth, the daughter and coheiress of Revd. George Mordaunt. He was educated at Eton College between 1766 and 1769. He succeeded his father to the baronetcy in 1774.

He served in the British Army as a cornet in the 10th Dragoons from 1772 to 1776. Later in his life he would serve as an officer in the volunteer militia.

He was elected Lord Mayor of York for 1787–88 and again for a second term for 1798–99. He represented the city of York from 1790 to 1811 as a Whig in both the Parliament of Great Britain, and from the Acts of Union 1800 the Parliament of the United Kingdom.

He married in 1776, Diana, the daughter of Humphrey Sturt of Crichel More, Dorset. They had 3 sons and 2 daughters. He was succeeded by his son Sir William Mordaunt Sturt Milner, 4th Baronet.

Parliament of Great Britain
Preceded by The Viscount Galway; Richard Slater Milnes	Member of Parliament for York; 1790–1800; With: Richard Slater Milnes	Succeeded by Parliament of the United Kingdom
Parliament of the United Kingdom
Preceded by Parliament of Great Britain	Member of Parliament for York; 1800–1811; With: Richard Slater Milnes 1800–1802; Lawrence Dundas 1802–1807; Mark Masterman-Sykes 1807–1811	Succeeded by Lawrence Dundas; Mark Masterman-Sykes
Baronetage of Great Britain
Preceded by William Milner	Baronet (of Nun Appleton Hall); 1774–1811	Succeeded by William Mordaunt Sturt Milner
