= Thomas Dundas, 2nd Earl of Zetland =

British nobleman and politician (1795–1873)

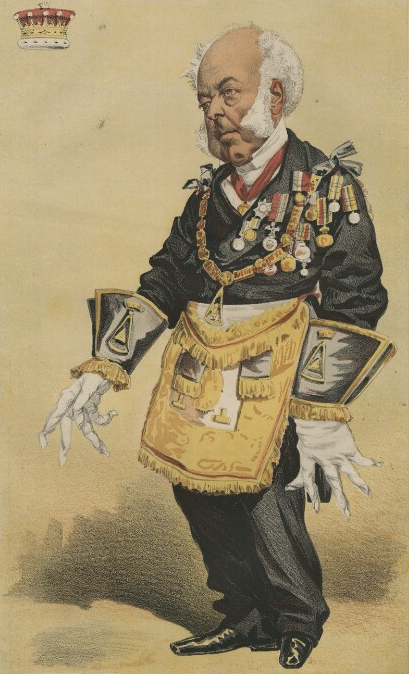
Thomas Dundas, 2nd Earl of Zetland, as Grand Master, from Vanity Fair, 1869.

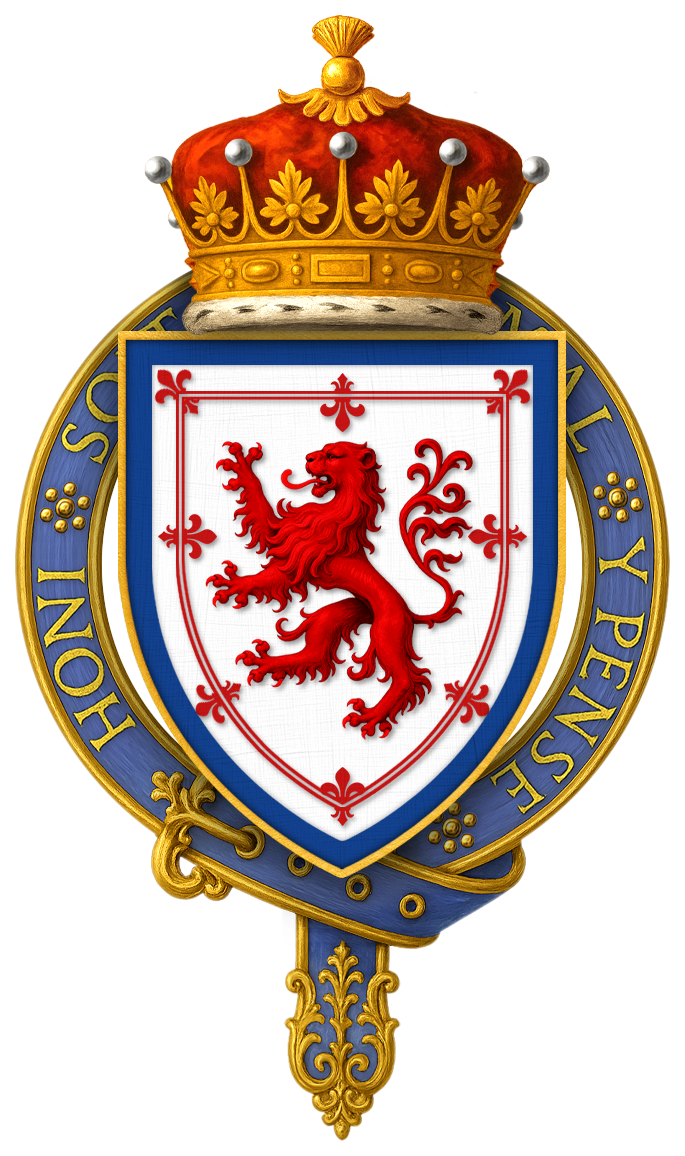
Garter encircled arms of Thomas Dundas, 2nd Earl of Zetland, KG, as displayed on his Order of the Garter stall plate in St. George's Chapel.

Thomas Dundas, 2nd Earl of Zetland (5 February 1795 – 6 May 1873), was a British nobleman and politician.

Born in Marylebone, London, eldest son of the 1st Earl and his wife Harriet Hale, he was educated at Harrow and Trinity College, Cambridge. In 1818 he was elected Whig Member of Parliament for his father and grandfather's old seat of Richmond, becoming representative for York twelve years later. In 1835 he returned to Parliament as member for Richmond, and four years later succeeded his father as second Earl of Zetland.

Like his father a prominent freemason, Lord Zetland was the United Grand Lodge of England's Grand Master from 1844 to 1870. Zetland was a senior member of the Jockey Club and won The Derby and St Leger Stakes with his horse Voltigeur in 1850.

In the year of his succession to the earldom, he was appointed Lord Lieutenant and Custos Rotulorum of the North Riding of Yorkshire, and in 1861 became a Knight of the Thistle. He resigned the Order on being made a Knight Companion of the Garter in 1872, and died the following year at Aske Hall, Yorkshire.

He married, on 6 September 1823, Sophia Jane, daughter of Sir Hedworth Williamson, Bt. The union produced no issue and his titles passed to his nephew, Lawrence Dundas, who later became Marquess of Zetland.

Parliament of the United Kingdom
Preceded by Dudley North; Robert Chaloner	Member of Parliament for Richmond; 1818–1830; With: Viscount Maitland 1818–1820; Samuel Barrett Moulton Barrett 1820–1828; Hon. Sir Robert Dundas 1828–1830	Succeeded by Hon. John Dundas; Hon. Sir Robert Dundas
Preceded by James Wilson; Marmaduke Wyvill	Member of Parliament for York; 1830–1832 with Samuel Adlam Bayntun	Succeeded by Hon. Edward Petre; Samuel Adlam Bayntun
Preceded by Hon. John Dundas; Hon. Sir Robert Dundas	Member of Parliament for Richmond; 1835–1839; With: Alexander Speirs	Succeeded by Alexander Speirs; Hon. Sir Robert Dundas
Honorary titles
Preceded by The Duke of Leeds	Lord Lieutenant of the North Riding of Yorkshire; 1838–1873	Succeeded by The Marquess of Ripon
Masonic offices
Preceded by The Duke of Sussex	Grand Master of the United Grand Lodge of England; 1844–1870	Succeeded by The Earl de Grey
Peerage of the United Kingdom
Preceded by Lawrence Dundas	Earl of Zetland; 1839–1873	Succeeded by Lawrence Dundas
