= Marquess of Zetland =

British peerage title

Marquessate of Zetland
- Blazon Arms: Argent, a lion rampant gules within a double tressure flory counterflory, all within a bordure azure. Crest: A lion’s head affrontée gules, encircled by an oak bush proper. Supporters: Two lions proper, each crowned with an antique crown or, and gorged with a chaplet of oak leaves vert; pendant from each chaplet an escutcheon, that on the dexter charged with the arms of Bruce, viz argent, a saltire and chief gules, and on a canton argent, a lion rampant azure; that on the sinister with the arms of Fitzwilliam, viz lozengy or and gules.
- Creation date: 22 August 1892
- Created by: Queen Victoria
- Peerage: Peerage of the United Kingdom
- First holder: Lawrence Dundas, 3rd Earl of Zetland
- Present holder: Robin Lawrence Dundas, 5th Marquess of Zetland
- Heir presumptive: Lord James Edward Dundas
- Remainder to: heirs male of the body lawfully begotten of the 1st Marquess and his brother
- Subsidiary titles: Earl of Zetland; Earl of Ronaldshay; Baron Dundas; Baronet 'of Kerse'
- Status: Extant
- Seat: Aske Hall
- Motto: ESSAYEZ (Try)

Marquess of Zetland is a title in the Peerage of the United Kingdom. It was created on 22 August 1892 for the former Lord Lieutenant of Ireland, Lawrence Dundas, 3rd Earl of Zetland. Zetland is an archaic form of Shetland. The Dundas family descends from the wealthy Scottish businessman and Member of Parliament, Lawrence Dundas. On 16 November 1762 he was created a Baronet, of Kerse in the County of Linlithgow, in the Baronetage of Great Britain. The title was created with remainder, failing heirs male of his own, to his brother Thomas Dundas and the heirs male of his body. He was succeeded by his son, the second Baronet. He represented Richmond and Stirling in the House of Commons and also served as Lord Lieutenant of Orkney and Shetland. In 1794 he was created Baron Dundas, of Aske in the North Riding of the County of York, in the Peerage of Great Britain. Lord Dundas notably purchased the right to the earldom of Orkney and lordship of Zetland from James Douglas, 14th Earl of Morton.

His son, the second Baron, was a Member of Parliament for Richmond and also served as Lord Lieutenant of Orkney and Shetland. In 1838 he was created Earl of Zetland in the Peerage of the United Kingdom. He was succeeded by his eldest son, the second Earl. He also represented Richmond and York in Parliament and served as Lord Lieutenant of the North Riding of Yorkshire. On his death, the titles passed to his nephew, the third Earl. At first a Liberal, he held minor office in the second administration of William Ewart Gladstone but later joined the Conservative Party and served from 1889 to 1892 as Lord Lieutenant of Ireland. The latter year he was honoured when he was made Earl of Ronaldshay, in the County of Orkney and Zetland, and Marquess of Zetland. The Earl of Ronaldshay is the courtesy title of the eldest son and heir of the Marquess. He was succeeded by his son, the second Marquess. He was also a prominent politician and served as Governor of Bengal and as Secretary of State for India. As of 2026 the titles are held by his great-grandson, the fifth Marquess, who succeeded his father in that year.

The family seat is Aske Hall, Richmond, North Yorkshire.

== Dundas Baronets, of Kerse (1762) ==
- Sir Lawrence Dundas, 1st Baronet (1710–1781)
- Sir Thomas Dundas, 2nd Baronet (1741–1820) (created Baron Dundas in 1794)

== Barons Dundas (1794) ==
- Thomas Dundas, 1st Baron Dundas (1741–1820)
- Lawrence Dundas, 2nd Baron Dundas (1766–1839) (created Earl of Zetland in 1838)

== Earls of Zetland (1838) ==
Other titles (1st Earl onwards): Baron Dundas (GB 1794)

- Lawrence Dundas, 1st Earl of Zetland (1766–1839)
- Thomas Dundas, 2nd Earl of Zetland (1795–1873)
- Lawrence Dundas, 3rd Earl of Zetland (1844–1929) (created Marquess of Zetland in 1892)

== Marquesses of Zetland (1892) ==
Other titles (1st Marquess onwards): Earl of Zetland (UK 1838), Earl of Ronaldshay (UK 1892), Baron Dundas (GB 1794)

- Lawrence Dundas, 1st Marquess of Zetland (1844–1929)
- Lawrence John Lumley Dundas, 2nd Marquess of Zetland (1876–1961)
- Lawrence Aldred Mervyn Dundas, 3rd Marquess of Zetland (1908–1989)
- Lawrence Mark Dundas, 4th Marquess of Zetland (1937–2026)
- Robin Lawrence Dundas, 5th Marquess of Zetland (born 1965)

== Present peer ==
Robin Lawrence Dundas, 5th Marquess of Zetland (born 5 March 1965) is the son of the 4th Marquess and his wife Susan Rose Chamberlin and was styled as Earl of Ronaldshay between 1989 and 2026.

Educated at Harrow School and the Royal Agricultural College, Cirencester, he was a director of Catterick Racecourse Company in 1988 and was managing director of Musks Ltd, sausage manufacturers, between 1993 and 1999. In 2003 he was living at Olliver, Richmond, Yorkshire.

On 24 January 2026, he succeeded as Marquess of Zetland (1892), Earl of Zetland (1838), Earl of Ronaldshay (1892), all in the peerage of the United Kingdom, and as Baron Dundas of Aske (1794), in the peerage of Great Britain. He also succeeded as 9th Baronet Dundas, of Kerse, Stirlingshire (1762), and inherited the Aske Hall estate.

On 12 April 1997, Zetland married Heather Hoffman, a daughter of Robert Hoffman. They have four daughters, Lady Eliza Constance (born 1998), Lady Minna Hermione (2000), Lady Flora Cicely (2001), and Lady Imogen Rose (2001).

The heir presumptive is the current holder's brother, Lord James Edward Dundas (b. 1967), whose heir apparent is his son Milo James Dundas (b. 1998).

== Line of succession and family tree ==
Line of succession (simplified)
- Lawrence Aldred Mervyn Dundas, 3rd Marquess of Zetland (1908–1989)
  - Lawrence Mark Dundas, 4th Marquess of Zetland (1937–2026)
    - Robin Lawrence Dundas, 5th Marquess of Zetland (b. 1965)
    - (1) Lord James Edward Dundas (b. 1967)
      - (2) Milo James Dundas (b. 1998)
  - (3) Lord David Paul Nicholas Dundas (b. 1945)
    - (4) Thomas Harry Django Dundas (b. 1981)
    - (5) Finn Arthur Ebenezer Dundas (b. 2000)
  - (6) Lord Richard Bruce Dundas (b. 1951)
    - (7) Max Charles Dundas (b. 1978)
    - (8) Alexander Lawrence Francis Dundas (b. 1999)

There are additional heirs in remainder to the earldom, barony and baronetcy descended from the younger brothers of the first marquess.

Marquess of Zetland family tree

Baronet of Kerse, 1682
Lawrence Dundas; 1710–1781; 1st Baronet	William Fitzwilliam; 1720–1756; Earl Fitzwilliam
Baron Dundas, 1794
Thomas Dundas; 1741–1820; 1st Baron Dundas, 2nd Baronet	Charlotte; 1746–1833
Earl of Zetland, 1838
Lawrence Dundas; 1766–1839; 1st Earl of Zetland, 2nd Baron Dundas, 3rd Baronet
Thomas Dundas; 1795–1873; 2nd Earl of Zetland, 3rd Baron Dundas, 4th Baronet	John Charles Dundas; 1808–1866
Richard Lumley; 1813–1884; Earl of Scarbrough
Marquess of Zetland and Earl of Ronaldshay, 1892
Lilian Selina Elizabeth Lumley; 1851–1943	Lawrence Dundas; 1844–1929; 1st Marquess of Zetland, etc., 3rd Earl of Zetland, 4th Baron Dundas, 5th Baronet	John Charles Dundas; 1845–1892
Lawrence John Lumley Dundas; 1876–1961; 2nd Marquess of Zetland, etc., 4th Earl of Zetland, 5th Baron Dundas, 6th Baronet
Lawrence Aldred Mervyn Dundas; 1908–1989; 3rd Marquess of Zetland, etc., 5th Earl of Zetland, 6th Baron Dundas, 7th Baronet
Lawrence Mark Dundas; 1937–2026; 4th Marquess of Zetland, etc., 6th Earl of Zetland, 7th Baron Dundas, 8th Baronet	David Paul Nicholas Dundas b. 1945
Robin Lawrence Dundas b. 1965; 5th Marquess of Zetland, etc., 7th Earl of Zetland, 8th Baron Dundas, 9th Baronet	James Edward Dundas b. 1967
Milo James Dundas b. 1998

Baronetage of Great Britain
Preceded by Paul baronets	Dundas baronets of Kerse; 16 November 1762	Succeeded by Lloyd baronets
