= Sir Lawrence Dundas, 1st Baronet =

British merchant and Whig politician (1712-1781)

Sir Lawrence Dundas
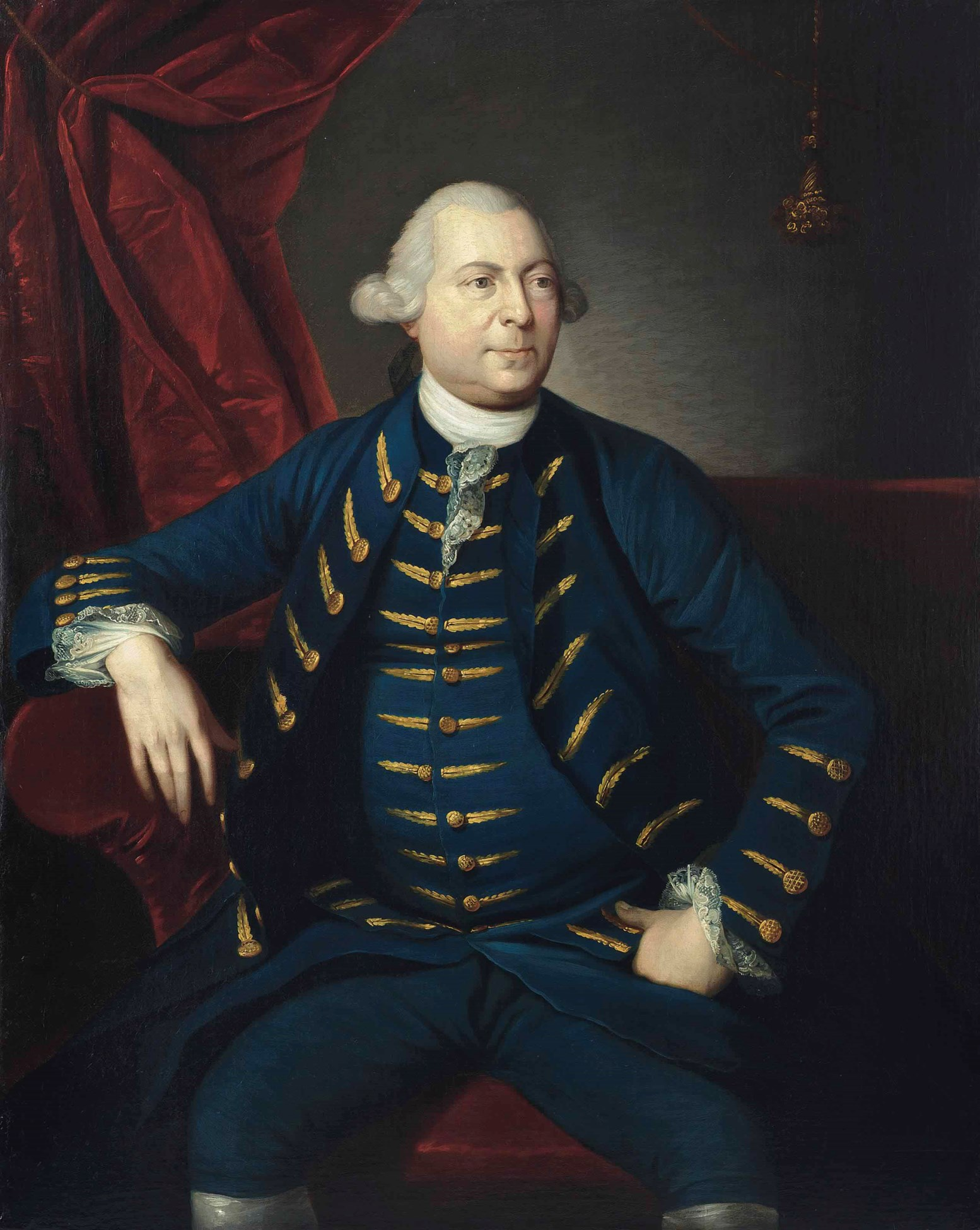
- Dundas, attributed to Nathaniel Dance-Holland)

Member of the British House of Commons
- In office 1747 – 21 September 1781
- Succeeded by: James Blair
- Constituency: Lanark (1747-1748); Newcastle-under-Lyme (1762-1768); Edinburgh (1768-1780); Richmond (1780-1781); Edinburgh (1781)

Personal details
- Born: 22 October 1712
- Died: 21 September 1781 (aged 68)
- Resting place: Falkirk, Scotland
- Party: Whig
- Children: Thomas

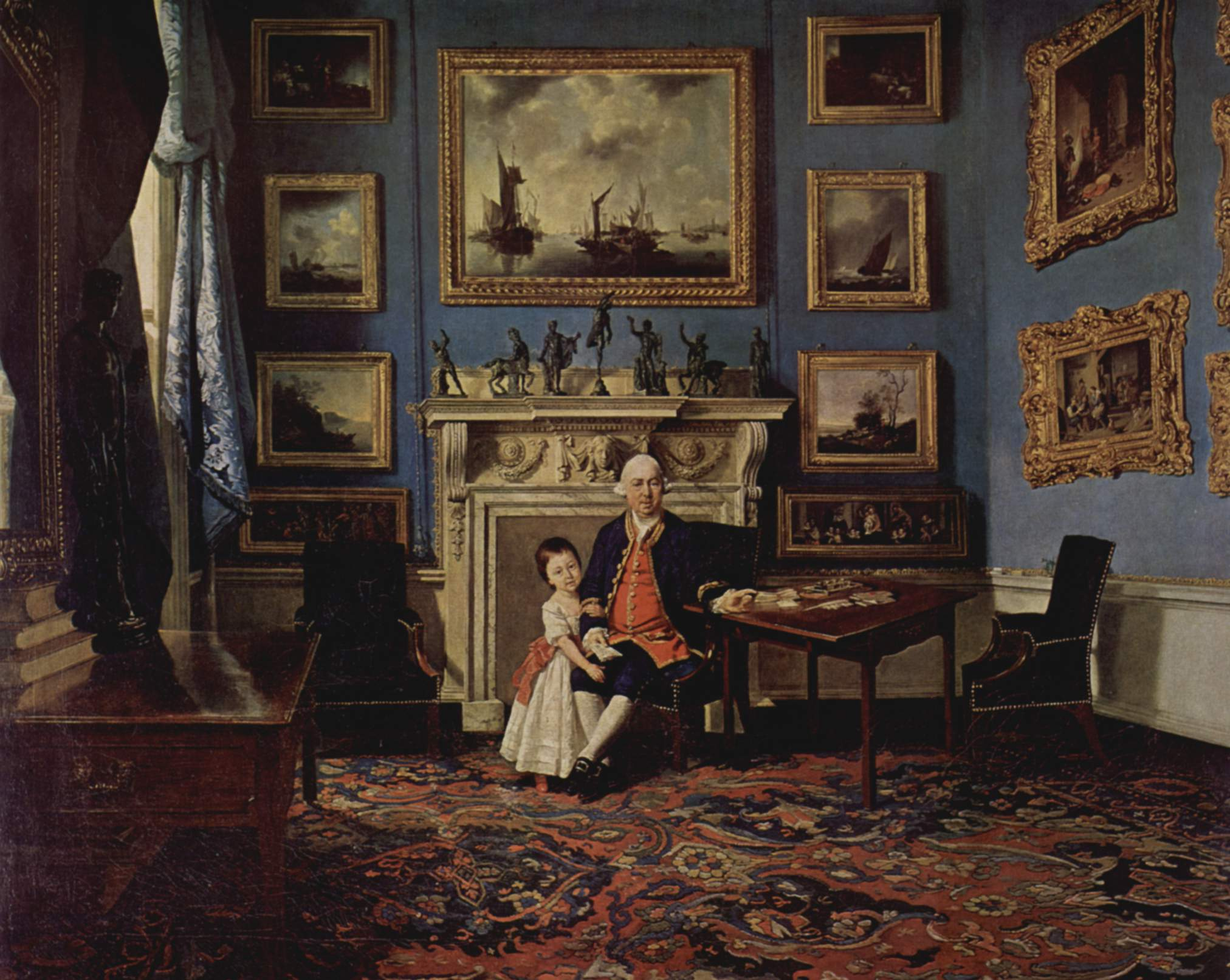
Dundas and his grandson Lawrence, painted by Johann Zoffany c. 1775

Sir Lawrence Dundas, 1st Baronet (22 October 1712 – 21 September 1781) was a British merchant and Whig politician.

== Life ==
He was the son of Thomas Dundas and Bethia Baillie. He made his first fortune as Commissary General: supplying goods to the British Army during the Jacobite rising of 1745 and the Seven Years' War. Dundas subsequently branched out into banking, property (he developed Grangemouth in 1777) and was a major backer of the Forth and Clyde Canal which happened to run through his estate, centred on Kerse House, near Falkirk. He left his son an inheritance worth £900,000. Sir Lawrence was also a man of taste, elected a member of the Society of Dilettanti in 1750.

He bought the Aske Estate, near Richmond in North Yorkshire in 1763 from Lord Holderness for £45,000 and proceeded to enlarge and remodel it in Palladian taste by the premier Yorkshire architect, John Carr, who also designed new stables. Dundas also acquired ownership over two slave plantations in the British West Indies, one in Dominica and one in Grenada.

In 1768, he acquired a tavern "Peace and Plenty" on the land destined to become Edinburgh's New Town. This was shown on James Craig's plan as a potential site for a church, but Dundas's wealth and ownership of the site allowed him to design his own mansion here, somewhat off the grid of the New Town. This house, now Dundas House in St. Andrew Square, was designed by Sir William Chambers, became the headquarters of the Royal Bank of Scotland in 1825. The facade and later 1857 ceiling feature on the current designs of the banknotes issued by the Royal Bank.

He purchased Giacomo Leoni's grand house near London, Moor Park, for which he ordered a set of Gobelins tapestry hangings with medallions by François Boucher and a long suite of seat furniture to match, for which Robert Adam provided designs: they are among the earliest English neoclassical furniture. A sofa and an armchair from this suite now reside in the Museum of Fine Arts, Houston and the Victoria and Albert Museum, respectively. Other new furnishings, for Aske and for Sir Lawrence's magnificently appointed London house at 19 Arlington Street, were supplied by Thomas Chippendale (1763–66), and Chippendale's rivals, the royal cabinet-makers William Vile and John Cobb, and Samuel Norman (Gilbert). A pair of marquetry commodes in the French taste by a French cabinet-maker working in London, Pierre Langlois, is at Aske. Capability Brown worked on the park at Aske and provided a design for a bridge. In the 1770s, Sir Lawrence turned to Robert Adam for further remodelling and designs for furnishings.

The Aske estate included the pocket borough of Richmond, so Sir Lawrence was, therefore, able to appoint the Member of Parliament. Sir Lawrence married Margaret Bruce, and they had one son, Thomas Dundas.

James Boswell described Dundas as "a comely jovial Scotch gentleman of good address but not bright parts ... I liked him much".

Dundas was a great collector of art. Long after his death, Messrs Greenwood sold 116 of his paintings on 29–31 May 1794 from their room in Leicester Square. They included works by Cuyp, Murillo, Raphael, Rubens and Teniers. Some of the Murillo's and perhaps other works would have been bought on commission by Dundas's friend John Blackwood.

Sir Lawrence died in 1781 and is buried in the Dundas Mausoleum at Falkirk Old Parish Church where his wife Margaret and son Thomas eventually joined him.

== Notes ==
Parliament of Great Britain
Preceded by John Mackye	Member of Parliament for Lanark Burghs; 1747–1748	Succeeded by James Carmichael
Preceded by John Waldegrave; Henry Vernon	Member of Parliament for Newcastle-under-Lyme; 1762–1768; With: John Waldegrave 1762–63; Thomas Gilbert 1763–68	Succeeded by John Wrottesley; Alexander Forrester
Preceded by James Coutts	Member of Parliament for Edinburgh; 1768–1780	Succeeded by William Miller
Preceded by William Norton; Charles Dundas	Member of Parliament for Richmond; 1780–1781; With: Marquess of Graham	Succeeded by Marquess of Graham; George Fitzwilliam
Preceded by William Miller	Member of Parliament for Edinburgh; 21 September 1781	Succeeded by James Hunter-Blair
Baronetage of Great Britain
New creation	Baronet (of Kerse); 1762–1781	Succeeded by Thomas Dundas
