= Sneaton Castle =

Building in Whitby, North Yorkshire, England

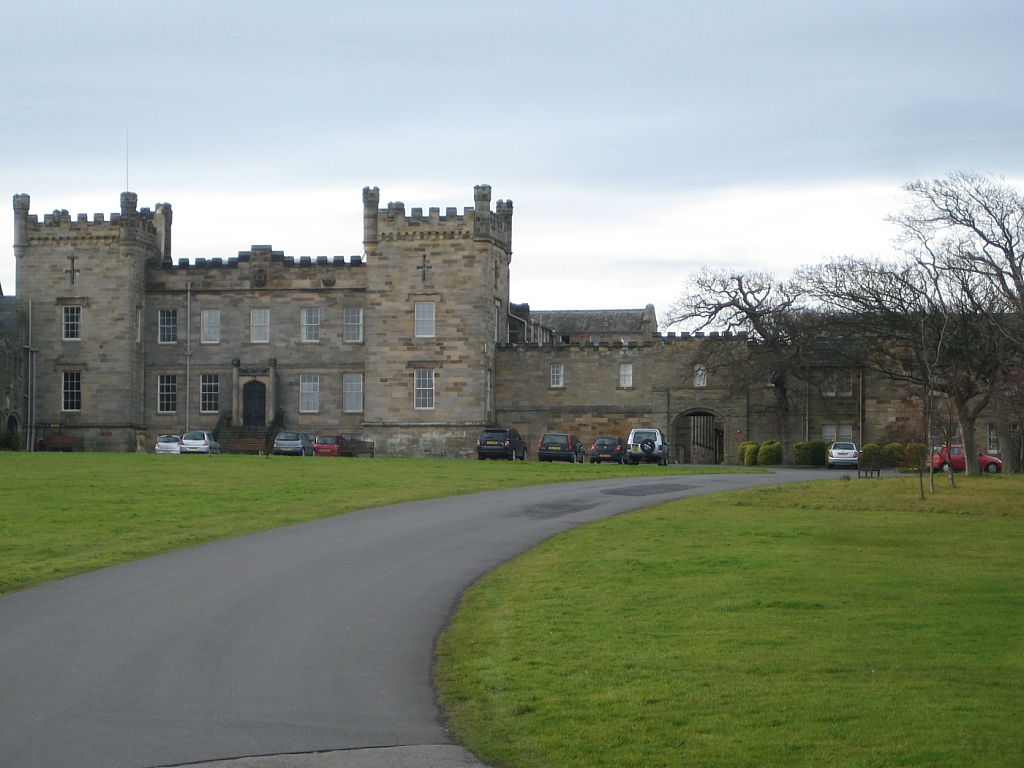
- The building in 2012

- Location within North Yorkshire

General information
- Status: Converted to hotel use
- Location: Castle Road, Whitby, North Yorkshire, England
- Coordinates: 54°29′01″N 0°38′34″W
- Year built: c. 1830 (probable)

Website
- sneatoncastle.co.uk

Listed Building – Grade II
- Official name: Sneaton Castle (St Hildas Priory)
- Designated: 23 February 1954
- Reference no.: 1148250

Sneaton Castle is a historic building on Castle Road (Note: The building's official listing gives its address as Guisborough Road, but its address is on Castle Road.) in Whitby, a town in North Yorkshire, England.

James Wilson purchased Sneaton Manor in 1820, and rebuilt it as a castellated house. In 1914, it was converted into the headquarters of the new Order of the Holy Paraclete, and a girls' boarding school. The school closed in 1997, and the order thereafter used the space as a conference and retreat centre. A new priory was built in the grounds in 2018, and the house was then converted into a hotel. The building has been Grade II listed since 1954.

The house is built of stone with flat roofs. The centre section has two storeys and five bays, and an embattled parapet stepped up in the centre over a coat of arms. In the centre is an enclosed embattled porch containing a doorway with a four-centred arch. The windows are sashes. The centre section is flanked by taller two-storey embattled towers containing sash windows and cross loops. The battlements are machicolated, and on the corners are embattled bartisans.

== See also ==
- Listed buildings in Whitby (outer areas)
