= Richard Watson (politician) =

British politician

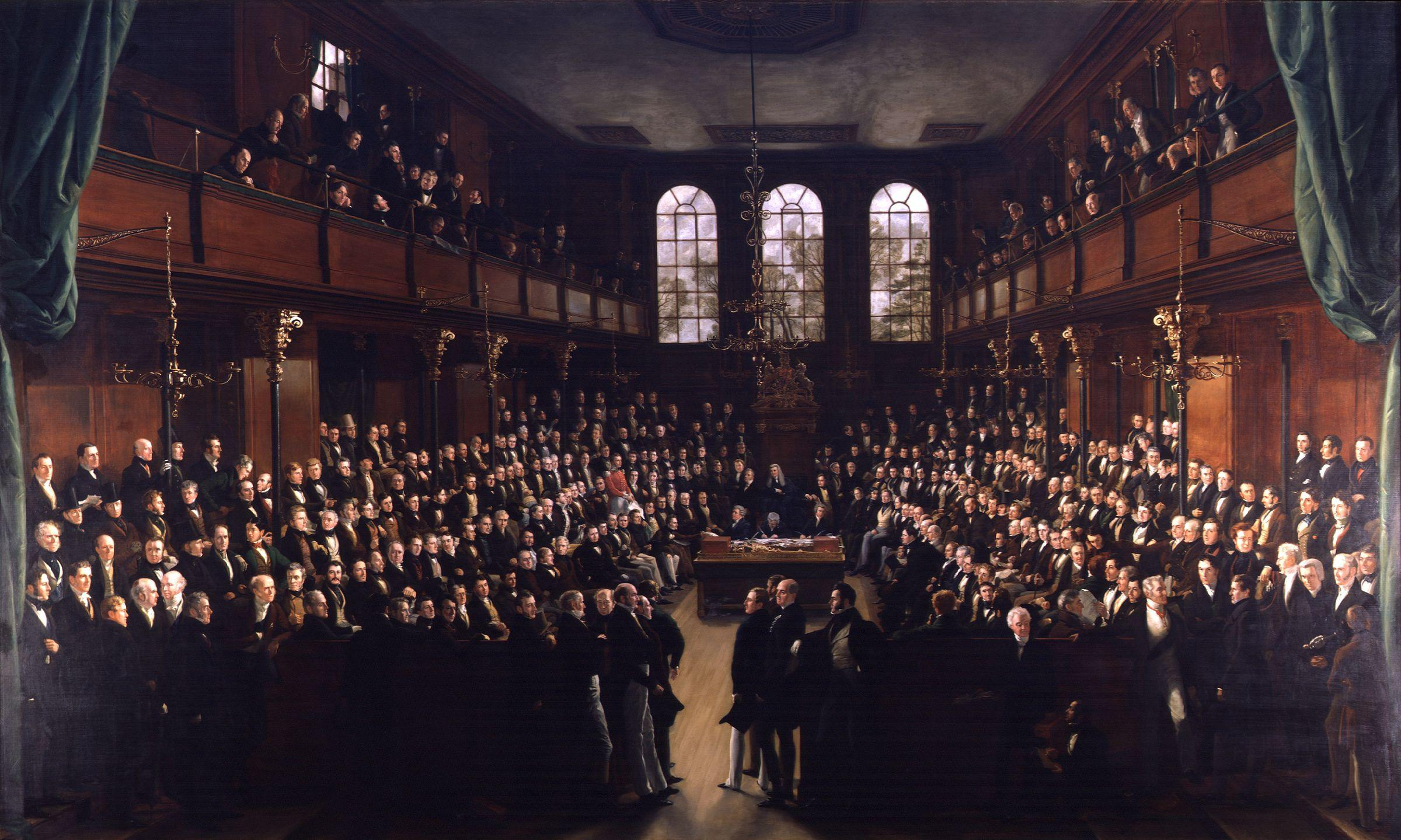

The Honourable Richard Watson (6 January 1800 – 24 July 1852) was a British Whig politician who served as a Member of Parliament (MP) for Canterbury from 1830 to 1835 and briefly in 1852 for Peterborough.

Watson was the fourth and youngest son of Lewis Thomas Watson, 2nd Baron Sondes (1794–1874), by his marriage to the heiress Mary Elizabeth Milles of North Elmham. His elder brother changed his name to Milles.

Watson was commissioned into the 11th Hussars, a cavalry regiment, and served in the Peninsula. He first stood for parliament at the 1826 general election in Canterbury, where he was nominated in his absence by the Reformers and polled just 107 votes. However, at the 1830 general election he topped the poll at Canterbury, with 1,334 votes, was returned unopposed in 1831, and again won a contested election in 1832, when one of the other candidates was the madman John Nichols Thom, calling himself Sir William Courtenay, otherwise 'Tom of Truro', who gained 375 votes. Watson was so dismayed by the support given to this opponent that he declined to stand again at the 1835 general election.

On 21 December 1839 Watson married Lavinia Jane, a daughter of Lord George Quin, granddaughter of Thomas Taylour, 1st Marquess of Headfort, and of George Spencer, 2nd Earl Spencer. They had three sons and two daughters, the last of whom was posthumous:

- George Lewis Watson, married Laura Maria (d. 1893), daughter of Sir John Hobart Culme-Seymour, 2nd Baronet, in 1867, without issue
- Edward Spencer Watson (d. January 1889), married Mary Blanche Hall on 28 September 1871 and had issue
- Rev. Wentworth Watson (1 March 1848 – 5 July 1925), vicar of Monmouth, St. Thomas', Oxford, and Abingdon, married Eveleen Frances Stopford, sister of Albert Stopford, on 23 April 1903
- Mary Georgiana Watson, married Sir Michael Culme-Seymour, 3rd Baronet on 16 October 1866
- Lavinia Grace Watson (1852–1933), married Baron Eugen von Roeder (1847–1938) on 14 July 1875 and had issue

In 1849, he inherited from his childless brother Henry the remaining Northamptonshire estates of the family, centered on Rockingham Castle, where he had lived since 1836.

On 7 July 1852 he was returned at the general election to the Commons as MP for Peterborough, but died a few weeks later on 24 July 1852, at the age of 52, at the Baths in Bad Homburg, near Frankfurt. His body was brought home to England and buried at Rockingham, Northamptonshire.

In 1850, Charles Dickens dedicated his novel, David Copperfield: "Affectionately Inscribed to The Hon. Mr and Mrs Richard Watson, of Rockingham, Northhampshire"

Parliament of the United Kingdom
Preceded by Lord Clifton; Stephen Rumbold Lushington	Member of Parliament for Canterbury; 1830 – 1835; With: Viscount Fordwich	Succeeded by Lord Albert Conyngham; Frederick Villiers
Preceded by George Wentworth-FitzWilliam; Hon. William Cavendish	Member of Parliament for Peterborough; Jul 1852 – Jul 1852; With: George Wentworth-FitzWilliam	Succeeded by George Wentworth-FitzWilliam; George Hammond Whalley
