= Charles Cavendish, 3rd Baron Chesham =

British politician

Major-General The Right Honourable The Lord Chesham KCB PC DL
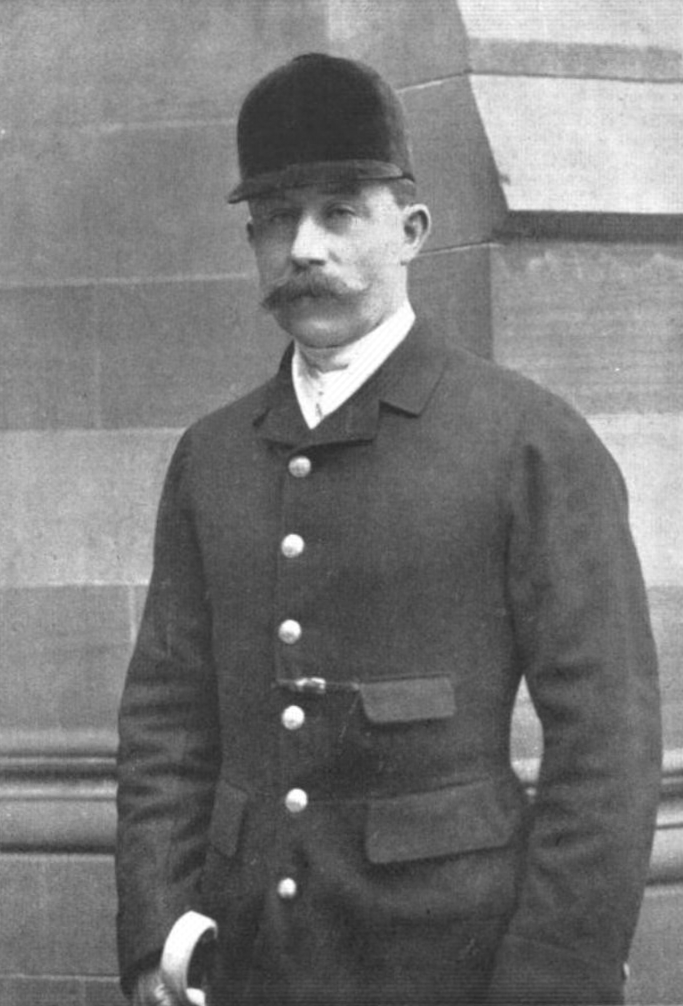
- In The Sketch, 3 January 1900

Master of the Buckhounds
- In office 1 November 1900 – 1901
- Monarch: Victoria
- Prime Minister: The Marquess of Salisbury
- Preceded by: The Earl of Coventry
- Succeeded by: Office abolished

Personal details
- Born: 13 December 1850 Burlington House, London
- Died: 9 November 1907 (aged 56) near Daventry, Northamptonshire
- Party: Conservative
- Spouse: Lady Beatrice Constance Grosvenor
- Children: 4
- Parent(s): William Cavendish, 2nd Baron Chesham; Henrietta Frances Lascelles
- Military career
- Allegiance: United Kingdom
- Branch: British Army
- Service years: 1870–1907
- Rank: Major-General
- Units: Imperial Yeomanry; Coldstream Guards; 10th Royal Hussars; 16th Lancers
- Conflicts: Second Boer War

Charles Compton William Cavendish, 3rd Baron Chesham, KCB, PC, DL (13 December 1850 – 9 November 1907), styled The Honourable Charles Cavendish between 1863 and 1882, was a British soldier, courtier and Conservative politician. He served as the last Master of the Buckhounds under Lord Salisbury from 1900 to 1901.

== Early life ==
A member of the Cavendish family headed by the Duke of Devonshire, Chesham was the eldest son of William Cavendish, 2nd Baron Chesham and his wife Henrietta Frances Lascelles, daughter of William Lascelles. He was educated at Eton College.

== Political career ==
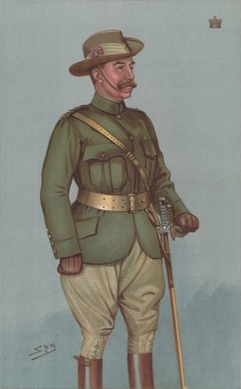
"Imperial Yeomanry" – Lord Chesham as caricatured by Spy (Leslie Ward) in Vanity Fair, March 1900

Lord Chesham took his seat in the House of Lords on his father's death in 1882.

In November 1900, he was appointed Master of the Buckhounds under Lord Salisbury. However, as Chesham was serving in South Africa, Lord Churchill was appointed to act as Master of the Buckhounds in his absence. Chesham remained Master until the office was abolished the following year. He was admitted to the Privy Council in July 1901, and also served as a Lord of the Bedchamber to the Prince of Wales (later King George V) from 1901 to 1907.

== Military career ==
He entered the Coldstream Guards in 1870. Three years later, he joined the 10th Royal Hussars as a captain, and 1878 joined the 16th Lancers. Chesham held an appointment as lieutenant colonel of the Royal Buckinghamshire Hussars Yeomanry from 1889. In January 1900 he was appointed in command of the 10th battalion of the Imperial Yeomanry (which included companies from Buckinghamshire, Berkshire and Oxfordshire), serving in the Second Boer War, and received the temporary rank of colonel in the army. He left Southampton on board the SS Norman in early February 1900, and arrived in South Africa the following month.

Later that year, he was promoted to brigadier general and in November 1900 appointed a Knight Commander of the Order of the Bath (KCB) for his services (he was invested by King Edward VII at Marlborough House on 25 July 1901 during a brief visit to London). From 1901 he was inspector general of Imperial Yeomanry in South Africa, with the local rank of major-general. He relinquished his commission and was granted the honorary rank of major-general in the Army on 22 January 1902, leaving South Africa the following month by the steamer RMS Kinfauns Castle. After his return to the United Kingdom, he was in late April 1902 appointed Inspector General of Imperial Yeomanry (at Army Headquarters) with the temporary rank of major-general whilst so employed.

Lord Chesham was appointed to honorary colonel of the Buckinghamshire Imperial Yeomanry (Royal Bucks Hussars) on 19 March 1902. There is a bronze statue commemorating his life and deeds located in the Market Square in Aylesbury, Buckinghamshire, which has Grade II Listed Building status.

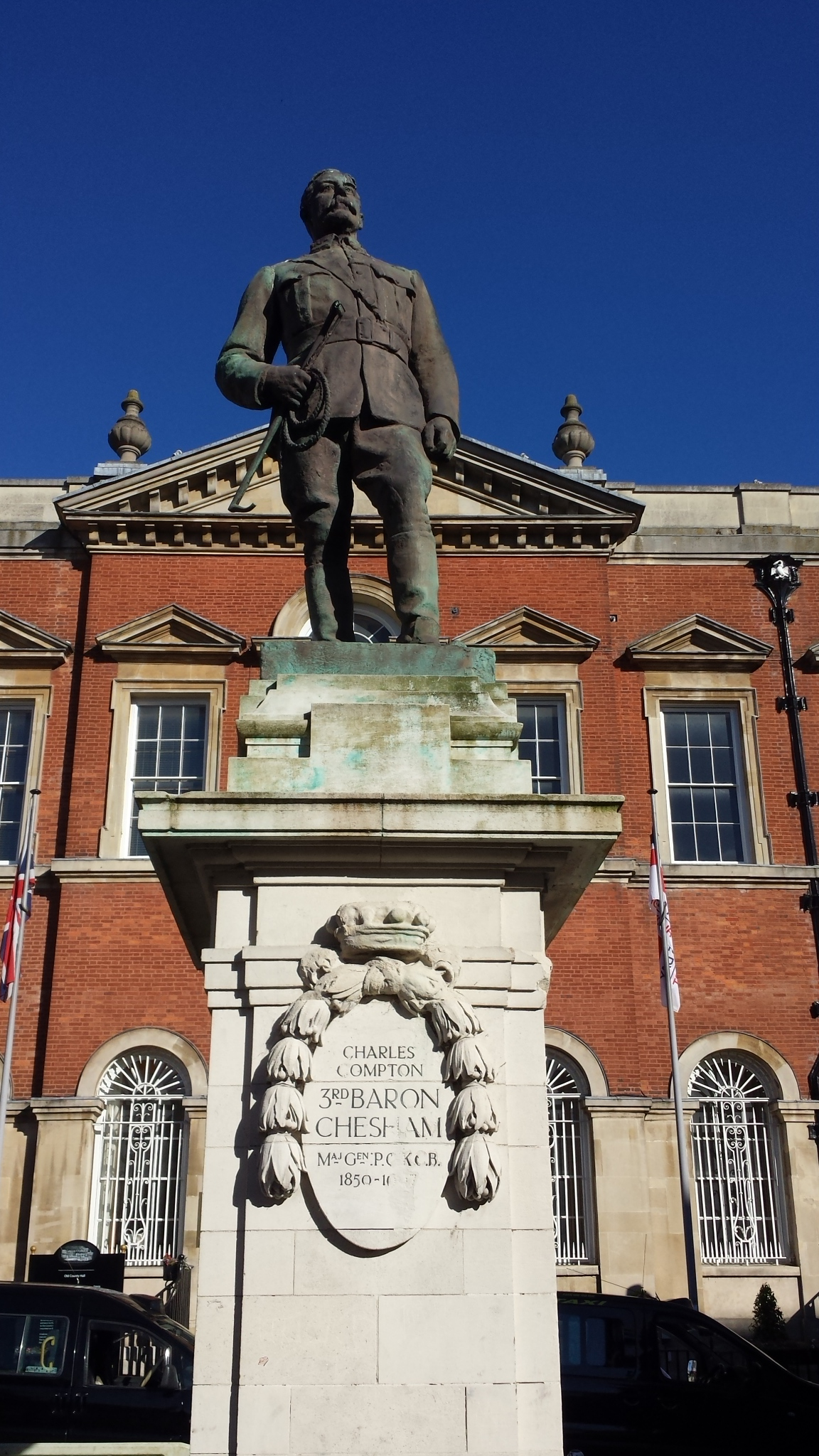
Compton 3rd Baron Chesham, statue in Aylesbury town centre photographed in 2018

== Family ==
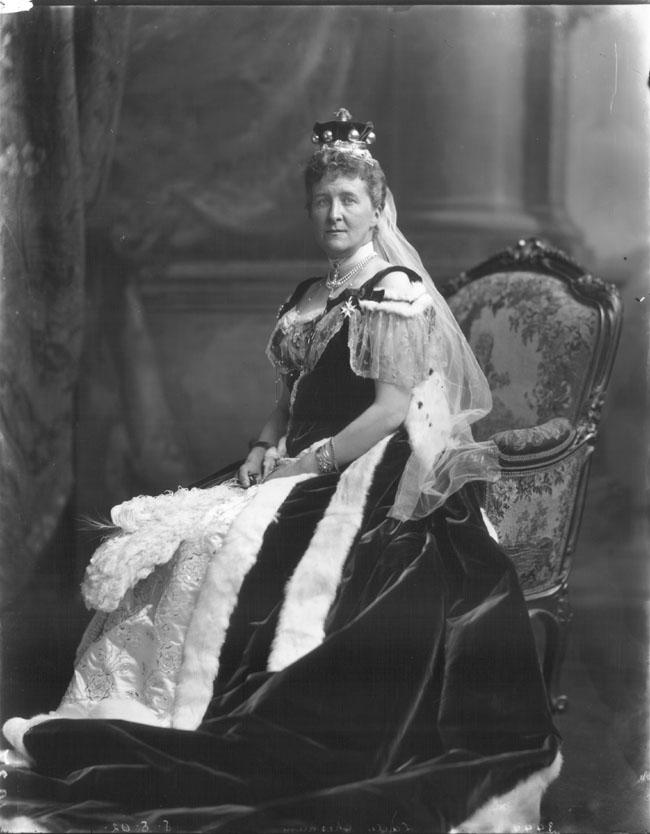
Beatrice (Constance), Baroness Chesham, photographed 8 August 1902

Lord Chesham married, in 1877, his second cousin Lady Beatrice Constance Grosvenor (1858–1911), second daughter of Hugh Grosvenor, 1st Duke of Westminster. They had two sons and two daughters:

- 2nd Lieutenant the Honourable Charles William Hugh Cavendish (13 September 1878 – 11 June 1900), in the 17th Lancers, killed in action near Pretoria during the Second Boer War
- Honourable Lilah Constance Cavendish OBE (20 March 1884 – 27 April 1944), married 1903 Sir Mervyn Manningham-Buller, 3rd Baronet (1876–1956), mother of Reginald Manningham-Buller, 1st Viscount Dilhorne
- Honourable Marjorie Beatrice Cavendish (18 September 1888 – 2 July 1897)
- John Compton Cavendish, 4th Baron Chesham (13 June 1894 – 26 April 1952)

Lady Chesham joined her husband in South Africa in April 1900, travelling there on the SS Dunottar Castle with her two sisters the Duchess of Teck and the Marchioness of Ormonde. She was appointed a Lady of Grace of the Order of St. John (DStJ) in July 1901, and in December the same year received the decoration of the Royal Red Cross (RRC) for her services with the Imperial Yeomanry Hospital during the Boer War.

Lord Chesham was killed in November 1907 after a fox-hunting accident near Daventry. He was thrown from his horse and suffered a dislocated neck. He was succeeded in the barony by his second but eldest surviving son John, then aged 13. After his death, in 1910, Lady Chesham remarried Maj. John Alexander Moncreiffe MC, son of Sir Thomas Moncreiffe, 7th Baronet.

Political offices
Preceded by The Earl of Coventry	Master of the Buckhounds; 1900–1901	Office abolished
Peerage of the United Kingdom
Preceded by William George Cavendish	Baron Chesham; 1882–1907	Succeeded by John Compton Cavendish
