= Lawrence Dundas, 1st Earl of Zetland =

British politician (1766-1839)

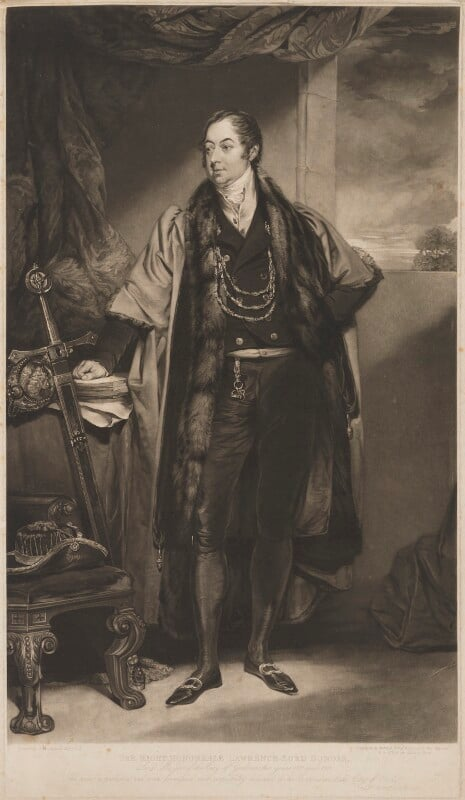
c. 1821 portrait of Lord Zetland

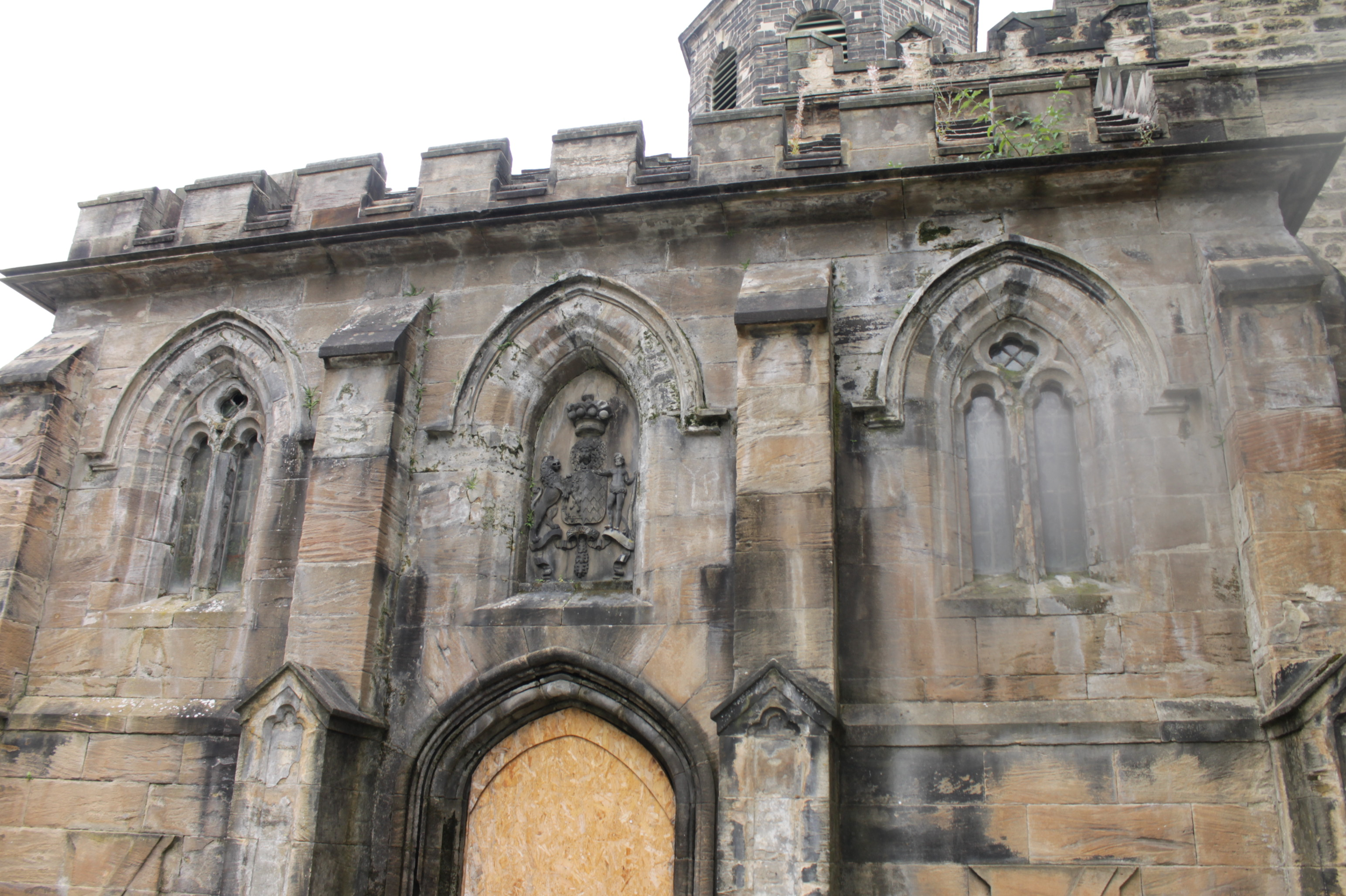
Mausoleum of Lawrence Dundas, Earl of Zetland, Trinity Church, Falkirk

Lawrence Dundas, 1st Earl of Zetland (10 April 1766 – 19 February 1839) was a British politician who sat in the House of Commons from 1790 to 1820 when he was raised to the peerage of the United Kingdom.

== Early life ==
Dundas was the son of Thomas Dundas, 1st Baron Dundas and was born in Westminster on 10 April 1766. He was educated at Harrow and was admitted at Trinity College, Cambridge. He married Harriot Hale, one of the twenty-one children of General John Hale and his wife Mary Chaloner, by whom he had three sons and four daughters.

== Military career ==
In 1789 Dundas was commissioned as a Captain in the disembodied North York Militia, of which his father was Lieutenant-Colonel. The regiment was embodied for full-time service on the outbreak of the French Revolutionary War, and Dundas was promoted to Major in 1795. In the frequent absences of the Colonel, Earl Fauconberg, and his father on parliamentary business, Dundas was often left in command of the regiment on its coast defence duties. When Fauconberg resigned the command on grounds of ill-health in 1797 Lord Dundas was appointed colonel and Major Lawrence Dundas was promoted to Lieutenant-Colonel. The regiment was disembodied after the Treaty of Amiens in 1802, but was re-embodied in 1803 when the peace broke down. However, Dundas resigned to become Lt-Col Commandant of the new Cleveland Volunteers on 24 October 1803. After an initial burst of enthusiasm, the volunteers declined and were replaced in 1808 by units of Local Militia raised under compulsory service. Dundas was commissioned as Lt-Col Commandant of the 3rd North York Local Militia on 24 September 1808. The Local Militia was disbanded in 1816.

== Political career ==
Dundas was elected Whig Member of Parliament for Richmond, North Yorkshire in 1790. Twelve years later he exchanged this seat for that of York, and in 1808 returned to Westminster as representative for his old Richmond seat. In 1811 he was again elected MP for York, and became Lord Mayor of the city that same year, having been an alderman since 1808. He was Lord Mayor a second time in 1821.

In 1820 Dundas succeeded his father as second Baron Dundas and as a baronet. He was appointed Lord Lieutenant of Orkney and Shetland in 1831, and in 1838, on the occasion of the coronation of Queen Victoria, he was created Earl of Zetland (i.e. Shetland) for having provided financial assistance to the new Queen's parents, the Duke & Duchess of Kent, in the years preceding her accession.

== Slave holder ==
According to the Legacies of British Slave-Ownership at the University College London, Zetland was awarded compensation in the aftermath of the Slavery Abolition Act 1833 with the Slave Compensation Act 1837.

Zetland was associated with "T71/880 Grenada claim no. 604 (Dougalston Estate)" and "T71/881 Dominica claim no. 576A & B (Castle Bruce)", he owned 351 slaves in Grenada and Dominica and received an £8,135 payment at the time (worth £837,206 in 2025).

== Later life and legacy ==
Dundas's wife died in 1834. He died suddenly on 19 February 1839 at his home of Aske Hall, Yorkshire. He was succeeded by his eldest son Thomas Dundas, 2nd Earl of Zetland.

He is buried in the family vault at Trinity Church in central Falkirk.

Parliament of Great Britain
Preceded by The Earl of Inchiquin; Sir Grey Cooper	Member of Parliament for Richmond (Yorkshire); 1790–1801; With: The Earl of Inchiquin 1790–1796; Charles George Beauclerk 1796–1798; Arthur Shakespeare 1798–1801	Succeeded by Parliament of the United Kingdom
Parliament of the United Kingdom
Preceded by Parliament of Great Britain	Member of Parliament for Richmond (Yorkshire); 1801–1802; With: Arthur Shakespeare	Succeeded by Arthur Shakespeare; George Heneage Lawrence Dundas
Preceded by Richard Slater Milnes; Sir William Mordaunt Milner	Member of Parliament for York; 1802–1807; With: Sir William Mordaunt Milner	Succeeded by Sir William Mordaunt Milner; Sir Mark Masterman-Sykes
Preceded by Arthur Shakespeare; Charles Lawrence Dundas	Member of Parliament for Richmond (Yorkshire); 1808–1811; With: Charles Lawrence Dundas 1808–1810; Robert Chaloner 1810–1811	Succeeded by George Dundas; Robert Chaloner
Preceded by Sir William Mordaunt Milner; Sir Mark Masterman-Sykes	Member of Parliament for York; 1811–1820; With: Sir Mark Masterman-Sykes 1811–1820; Marmaduke Wyvill 1820	Succeeded by Robert Chaloner; Marmaduke Wyvill
Honorary titles
Vacant Title last held by The Lord Dundas	Lord Lieutenant of Orkney and Shetland; 1831–1839	Succeeded by John Charles Dundas
Peerage of Great Britain
Preceded by Thomas Dundas	Baron Dundas; 1820–1839	Succeeded by Thomas Dundas
Peerage of the United Kingdom
New creation	Earl of Zetland; 1838–1839	Succeeded by Thomas Dundas
