= Robert Chaloner (MP) =

Robert Chaloner, FRS (23 September 1776 – 7 October 1842) was an English Member of Parliament and Lord Mayor of York.

Born the son of William Chaloner of Guisborough, Yorkshire he was educated at Harrow School. He succeeded his elder brother Thomas in 1796 to Guisborough Hall.

He joined the North West Riding yeomanry as a Cornet, becoming a captain in 1798. He was a major in the Cleveland Volunteers in 1803 and in the North Riding militia in 1808.

He was elected MP for Richmond in 1810, sitting until 1818 and then elected again in 1820 for York, sitting until 1826. He served as Lord Mayor of York for 1817–18 and was elected a Fellow of the Royal Society in 1811.

He was bankrupted in the financial crisis of 1825–6, and his Yorkshire property was only saved by the help of his wife's cousin, the Earl of Fitzwilliam, who also appointed Chaloner as land agent of his 85,000-acre Coolattin estate in Ireland. On the Irish estates Chaloner a prime mover in land clearances and the forced emigration of ‘surplus’ peasant families. He was awarded compensation under The Slave Compensation Act 1837 with Abel Rous Dottin, John Pollard Mayers and Henry Walker Yeoman as trustees of the marriage settlement of his sister Caroline Cumberbatch for the Cleland and Farm estates in Barbados.

He married the Hon. Frances Laura Dundas, daughter of Sir Thomas Dundas, 1st Baron Dundas, and had 3 sons and 3 daughters.

Parliament of the United Kingdom
| Preceded by Lawrence Dundas, 1st Earl of Zetland; Charles Lawrence Dundas | Member of Parliament for Richmond (Yorkshire); 1810–1818; With: Lawrence Dundas, 1st Earl of Zetland 1810–1812; George Dundas 1812; Dudley Long North 1812–1818 | Succeeded by Thomas Dundas, 2nd Earl of Zetland; James Maitland, 9th Earl of Lauderdale |
| Preceded by Lawrence Dundas, 1st Earl of Zetland; Marmaduke Wyvill | Member of Parliament for York; 1820–1826; With: Marmaduke Wyvill | Succeeded by James Wilson; Marmaduke Wyvill |
