= John Dundas (1808–1866) =

British politician (1808-1866)

Hon. John Charles Dundas

Member of Parliament for Richmond (Yorkshire)
- In office 1830–1835 Serving with Robert Lawrence Dundas (1830-1835)
- Preceded by: Hon. Thomas Dundas; Hon. Sir Robert Lawrence Dundas
- Succeeded by: Alexander Speirs; Thomas Dundas

Member of Parliament for York
- In office 1835–1837 Serving with John Lowther
- Preceded by: Hon. Edward Robert Petre; Hon. Thomas Dundas
- Succeeded by: John Lowther; Henry Redhead Yorke

Member of Parliament for Richmond (Yorkshire)
- In office 1841–1847 Serving with William Nicholas Ridley Colborne (1841-1846); Henry Rich (1846-1847)
- Preceded by: Hon. Sir Robert Lawrence Dundas; Hon. George Wentworth-FitzWilliam
- Succeeded by: Henry Rich; Marmaduke Wyvill

Member of Parliament for Richmond (Yorkshire)
- In office 1865–1866 Serving with Sir Roundell Palmer
- Preceded by: Marmaduke Wyvill; Sir Roundell Palmer
- Succeeded by: Sir Roundell Palmer; Marmaduke Wyvill

Personal details
- Born: 21 August 1808
- Died: 14 February 1866 (aged 57) Nice, France
- Party: Whig; Liberal
- Spouse: Margaret Matilda Talbot (m. 1843)
- Parents: Lawrence Dundas (father); Harriot Hale (mother)
- Relatives: Thomas Dundas (brother); Lawrence Dundas (son); John Dundas (son)

The Hon. John Charles Dundas (21 August 1808 – 14 February 1866) was a British Whig, and later Liberal politician.

== Background ==
Dundas was a younger son of Lawrence Dundas, 1st Earl of Zetland, and Harriot (née Hale). Thomas Dundas, 2nd Earl of Zetland, was his elder brother.

== Political career ==
Dundas entered Parliament for Richmond, Yorkshire, in 1830, a seat he held until 1835, and again between 1841 and 1847 and 1865 and 1866. He also represented York from 1835 to 1837.

== Family ==
Dundas married Margaret Matilda, daughter of James Talbot and Mary (née Sutton), in 1843. His eldest son Lawrence succeeded in the earldom of Zetland in 1873 and was created Marquess of Zetland in 1892. His second son John was a politician. Dundas died in Nice, in February 1866, aged 57. His wife survived him by over 40 years and died in December 1907.

Parliament of the United Kingdom
| Preceded by Hon. Thomas Dundas; Hon. Sir Robert Lawrence Dundas | Member of Parliament for Richmond (Yorkshire); 1830–1835; With: Hon. Sir Robert Lawrence Dundas | Succeeded by Hon. Thomas Dundas; Alexander Speirs |
| Preceded by Hon. Edward Robert Petre; Hon. Thomas Dundas | Member of Parliament for York; 1835–1837; With: John Lowther | Succeeded by John Lowther; Henry Redhead Yorke |
| Preceded by Hon. Sir Robert Lawrence Dundas; Hon. George Wentworth-FitzWilliam | Member of Parliament for Richmond (Yorkshire); 1841–1847; With: William Nicholas Ridley Colborne 1841–1846; Henry Rich 1846–1847 | Succeeded by Henry Rich; Marmaduke Wyvill |
| Preceded by Marmaduke Wyvill; Sir Roundell Palmer | Member of Parliament for Richmond (Yorkshire); 1865–1866; With: Sir Roundell Palmer | Succeeded by Sir Roundell Palmer; Marmaduke Wyvill |
Honorary titles
| Preceded by The Earl of Zetland | Lord Lieutenant of Orkney and Shetland; 1839–1866 | Succeeded by Frederick Dundas |
