= Aske Hall =

Country house in North Yorkshire, England

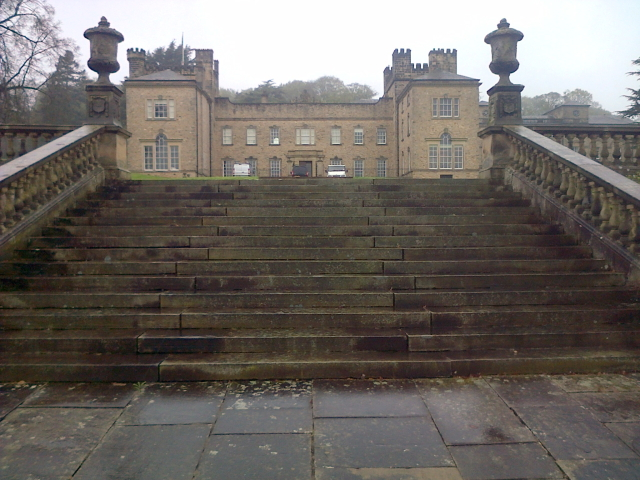

- Location within North Yorkshire

General information
- Architectural style: Georgian architecture
- Location: Richmond, England, England
- Coordinates: 54°25′32″N 1°43′40″W
- Owner: Marquess of Zetland

Design and construction
- Architects: John Carr; Daniel Garrett

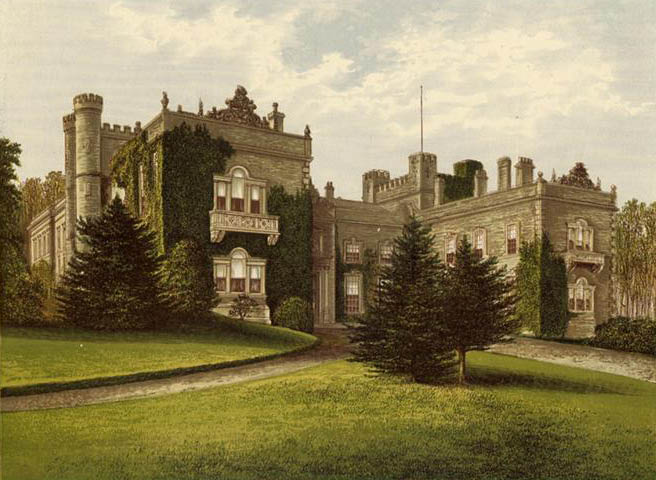
Aske Hall circa 1880

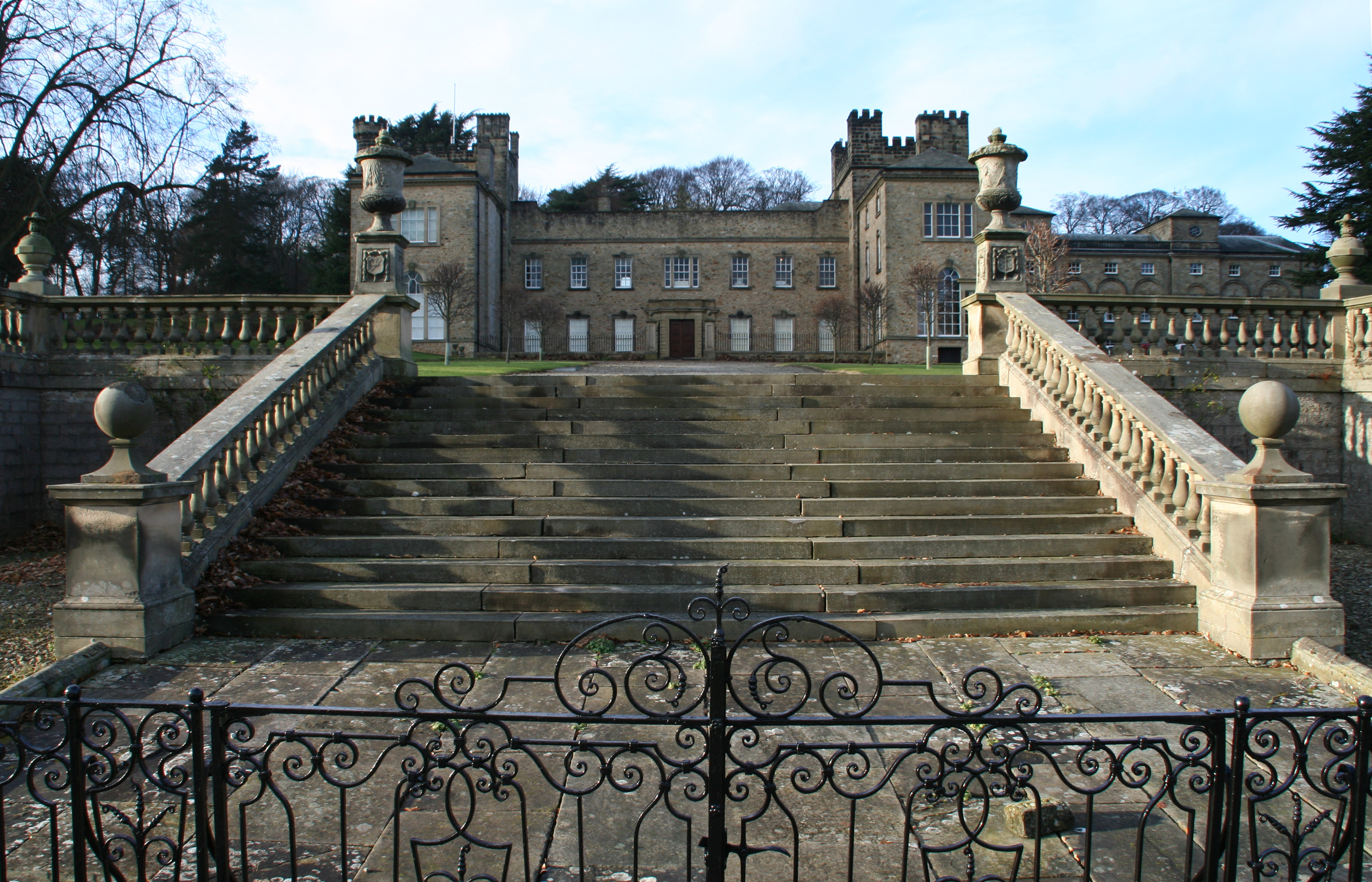
January 2009

Aske Hall is a Georgian country house, with parkland attributed to Capability Brown, 1.5 miles (2.4 km) north of Richmond, North Yorkshire, England. It contains an impressive collection of 18th-century furniture, paintings and porcelain, and in its grounds a John Carr stable block converted into a chapel in Victorian times with Italianate decor, a Gothic-style folly built by Daniel Garrett circa 1745, coach house with carriage, Victorian stable block, walled garden, terraced garden and lake with a Roman-style temple. The hall and estate are currently owned by the Marquess of Zetland.

== History ==
It is a place of some antiquity, and long the de Aske family residence, but at first consisted merely of a square tower surrounded by bare and swampy fields. In this state it remained until it was purchased, in 1727, by Sir Conyers Darcy, who commenced the improvements that have now made it one of the finest country seats in the neighbourhood. There is an extensive prospect over the surrounding landscape from the top of the Temple, which is built on the exact model of a Hindu Temple. On Pilmore Hill (between Aske and Richmond) is a tower bearing the name of Olliver Ducat, which is said to be a perfect counterpart of an Indian hillfort.

With the exception of the pele tower, which dates from the 12th century, the earliest surviving sections of Aske Hall were constructed in the 15th century by the medieval family of de Aske. In 1578 Robert and Eleanor Bowes added the manorial hall which was two-storeys high internally, with a frieze about 3 feet (0.91 m) high of allegorical figures with foliage in bas-relief, which was meant to be enjoyed from the lower level looking up. A section of this frieze has survived the many subsequent phases of alterations. King James came to Aske on 16 April 1617 as the guest of Thomas Wharton.

In 1722 Sir Conyers Darcy acquired from Philip, Duke of Wharton a house that had been neglected for the best part of a century and he commenced his improvements in 1727. Some idea of the improvements he carried out may be had from a survey of the estate lodged with the Dundas Papers at the North Yorkshire Record Office in Northallerton. This survey shows that Darcy "swept away the complex roofing [except the towers], removed the porch and the projecting blocks in the corners of the wings and completely refenestrated the house". The architect for these changes appears to have been William Wakefield. Darcy also remodelled Aske's somewhat swampy setting, creating the lake, the temple [1740 by Daniel Garrett] and a large "Gothick" garden building to the north of the Hall. Darcy died in 1758 and the house passed to his nephew Lord Holderness, who created a detailed survey for its resale.

In 1763 Sir Lawrence Dundas, 1st Baronet purchased the house for £45,000. In partnership with his architect, John Carr, Dundas sought to transform Aske Hall into one of the great 18th-century houses of the North, "a fitting monument" and pendant to a man who was himself known as "the Nabob of the North". The newly refurbished Aske was to furnish him with a "suitable seat for a new dynasty and a controlling influence in the parliamentary borough of Richmond". Initially work was concentrated on completing the offices, stables, bakehouse, wash-house and laundry. The Dundas Papers also record that Carr demolished the rear section of the dwelling while leaving the hall range and wings intact. According to Giles Worsley: "In its place, grouped round an open courtyard, was built a new kitchen, scullery and a range of servants' rooms, including a steward's parlour, a housekeeper's room and a strongroom, together with family rooms and a staircase." The surrounding parkland was landscaped by Capability Brown in 1770.

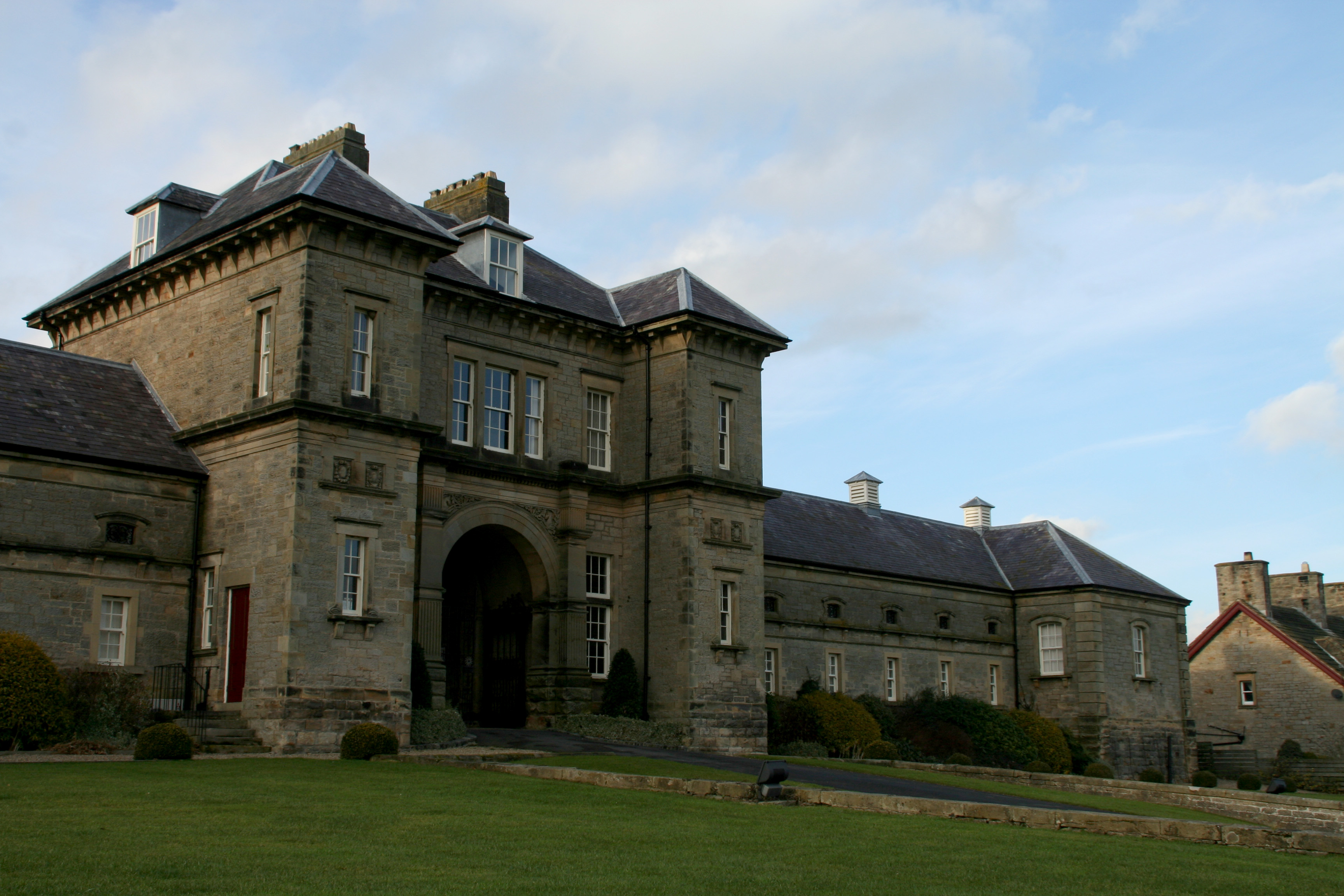
Former stable block

Thomas Dundas, 2nd Earl of Zetland (1795–1873), made "substantial but essentially cosmetic" alterations to Aske Hall. "A faint Jacobean trim was added to the front, with a balcony on each of the wings and cresting above them and over the centre of the house." The latter bore the arms of the new master of Aske. "On the west front the Jacobean tower was remodelled, its square turrets being replaced by round ones, while the three bays immediately to its left may also have been replaced. The architect for the alterations was probably Ignatius Bonomi." Bonomi was probably also responsible for one of the west lodges, which is dated 1847.

The estate then descended to Lawrence Dundas, 3rd Marquess of Zetland, who died in 1989, who was succeeded by Mark Dundas, 4th Marquess of Zetland. The current owner is his son Robin Dundas, 5th Marquess of Zetland.

Aske Hall appeared in scenes of the TV series The Fast Show.

The house is a Grade I listed building. It is open to the public (for guided tours only) on a very limited number of days per year.

== See also ==
- Grade I listed buildings in North Yorkshire (district)
- Listed buildings in Aske, North Yorkshire
