= Marmaduke Wyvill (1791–1872) =

Marmaduke Wyvill (1791–1872) was an English Whig politician.

== Life ==
The eldest son of Christopher Wyvill by his second marriage, to Sarah Codling, he was educated at Eton College and Trinity College, Cambridge, where he matriculated in 1810. He stood for election to parliament at York in 1820, calling himself a "moderate reformer". In difficulty financially, he did not stand again in 1830.

== Family ==
Wyvill married Rachel Milnes, second daughter of Richard Slater Milnes MP of Fryston Hall, Yorkshire. They had three sons and four daughters. The eldest son Marmaduke, also a Member of Parliament, is known as a chess player.
