= Marmaduke Wyvill =

Marmaduke Wyvill may refer to:

- Marmaduke Wyvill (MP for Ripon) (died 1558), English MP (Member of Parliament) for Ripon
- Sir Marmaduke Wyvill, 1st Baronet (c.1542–1617), English MP for Richmond 1584–1585 and 1597–1598
- Sir Marmaduke Wyvill, 5th Baronet (c.1666–1722), English MP for Richmond 1695–1698
- Sir Marmaduke Wyvill, 6th Baronet (c.1692–1754), English MP for Richmond 1727–1728
- Marmaduke Wyvill (1791–1872), English Whig MP for York 1820–1826
- Marmaduke Wyvill (chess player) (1815–1896), English chess master and Liberal MP for Richmond 1847–1865 and 1866–1868
- Marmaduke D'Arcy Wyvill (1849–1918), English Conservative MP for Otley 1895–1900

== See also ==
- Wyvill (surname)
