= James Darcy, 1st Baron Darcy of Navan =

British Tory politician and peer

James Darcy, 1st Baron Darcy of Navan (c. 1650 – 19 July 1731) was a British Tory politician and peer.

== Biography ==
He was the eldest son of Hon. James Darcy, son of Conyers Darcy, 7th Baron Darcy de Knayth, and Isabel Wyvill, daughter of Sir Marmaduke Wyvill, 2nd Baronet. He was educated at Sidney Sussex College, Cambridge from 1668.

He served in the House of Commons of England as the Member of Parliament for Richmond between 1698 and 1701. His election was largely the result of the electoral influence of his cousin, Robert Darcy, 3rd Earl of Holderness, but Darcy soon became a political follower of the Tory William Bromley. He was re-elected to sit for the seat from 1702 to 1705. Darcy was among the High Tories who voted in favour of the Tack in late 1704, an action which provoked the anger of the Whig Lord Wharton who was trying to cultivate his own interest in Richmond. Wharton later contrived to ensure that Darcy lost his seat to Wharton Dunch at the 1705 English general election.

On 13 September 1721 Darcy was created Baron Darcy of Navan in the Peerage of Ireland. The title was created with special remainder to male heirs of his daughter, Mary.

He was married four times, but had no male issue. His daughter Mary married William Jessop. He was succeeded in his title by the terms of the remainder by his grandson, James Jessop, who subsequently changed his surname to Darcy.

Parliament of England
Preceded by Thomas Yorke; Sir Marmaduke Wyvill, Bt.	Member of Parliament for Richmond; 1698–1701; With: Thomas Yorke	Succeeded by Thomas Yorke; John Hutton
Preceded by Thomas Yorke; John Hutton	Member of Parliament for Richmond; 1702–1705; With: Thomas Yorke	Succeeded by Thomas Yorke; Wharton Dunch
Peerage of Ireland
New creation	Baron Darcy of Navan; 1721–1731	Succeeded by James Darcy
