= Thomas Yorke (1688–1768) =

British Member of Parliament (1688-1768)

Thomas Yorke (1688–1768) of Gouthwaite Hall and Halton West, Yorkshire was an English landowner and politician, who sat in the British House of Commons between 1757 and 1761.

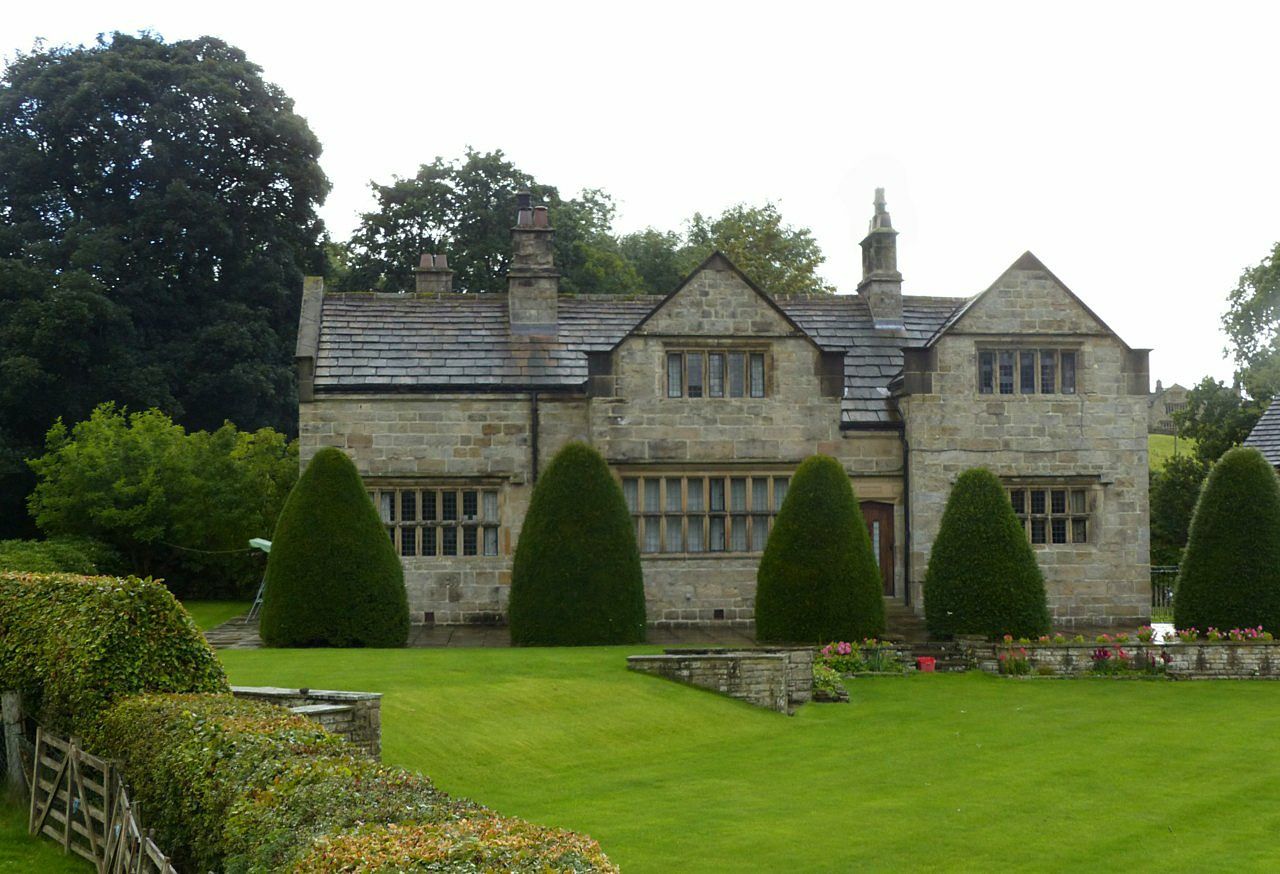
Gouthwaite Hall, Nidderdale, North Yorkshire

Yorke was born in 1688 at Richmond in the North Riding of Yorkshire, the son of Thomas Yorke (1658–1716) of Gouthwaite Hall and Richmond and his wife Katherine Lister. In 1729 he married Abigail (died 1741), daughter of William Andrews of Barneshall, Worcester. They lived in London and later at Helperby in Yorkshire. In 1736 he purchased an estate at Halton West in Ribblesdale, which has remained in the Yorke family to the present day.

Thomas's father was MP for Richmond in the North Riding of Yorkshire between 1689 and 1716, with two short intervals, and Thomas's elder brother John succeeded their father as MP for Richmond until his death in 1757. Thomas then succeeded his brother as MP for Richmond until the 1761 general election. His brother died childless, so Thomas inherited his brother's estates in Nidderdale (including Gouthwaite Hall) and Richmond.

Yorke died in 1768 and was buried at St George's, Hanover Square in London. He left 2 sons and 3 daughters.

Parliament of Great Britain
Preceded by John Yorke; Earl of Ancram	Member of Parliament for Richmond; 1757–1761; With: Earl of Ancram	Succeeded by Earl of Ancram; Sir Ralph Milbanke
