= Sir John Aubrey, 2nd Baronet =

17th-century English politician

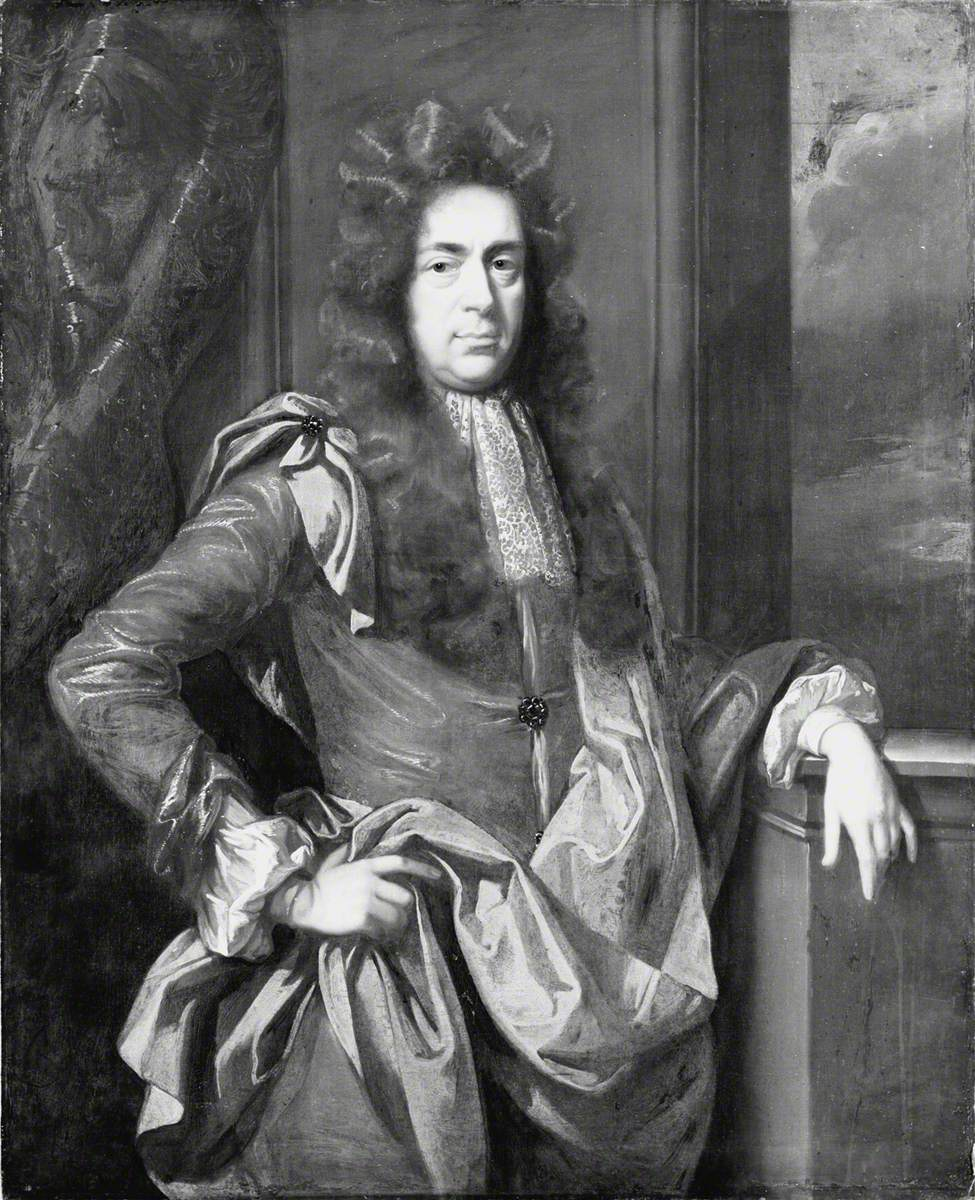

Sir John Aubrey, 2nd Baronet (c. 1650 – 15 September 1700) was an English politician.

He was the only surviving son of Sir John Aubrey, 1st Baronet, and his wife Mary South, daughter of Sir Richard South. Aubrey matriculated from Jesus College, Oxford, in 1668, and was called to the bar by the Middle Temple in 1672. He succeeded his father as baronet in 1679, and was High Sheriff of Glamorganshire in 1685. Aubrey was Member of Parliament (MP) for Brackley from 1698 to his death in 1700.

On 1 March 1678, he married firstly Margaret Lowther, daughter of Sir John Lowther, 1st Baronet in St James's in London. By 1691, he married secondly Mary Jephson, daughter of William Lewis and widow of William Jephson. Aubrey died at Boarstall in Buckinghamshire after a fall from his horse and was buried at the old family home Llantrithyd in Glamorgan. His only son John succeeded to the baronetcy.

Parliament of England
| Preceded by Charles Egerton; Harry Mordaunt | Member of Parliament for Brackley; 1698–1700; With: Charles Egerton | Succeeded by Charles Egerton; Harry Mordaunt |
Baronetage of England
| Preceded by John Aubrey | Baronet (of Llantrithead); 1679–1700 | Succeeded by John Aubrey |
