= William Walsh (poet) =

English politician and poet (1662–1708)

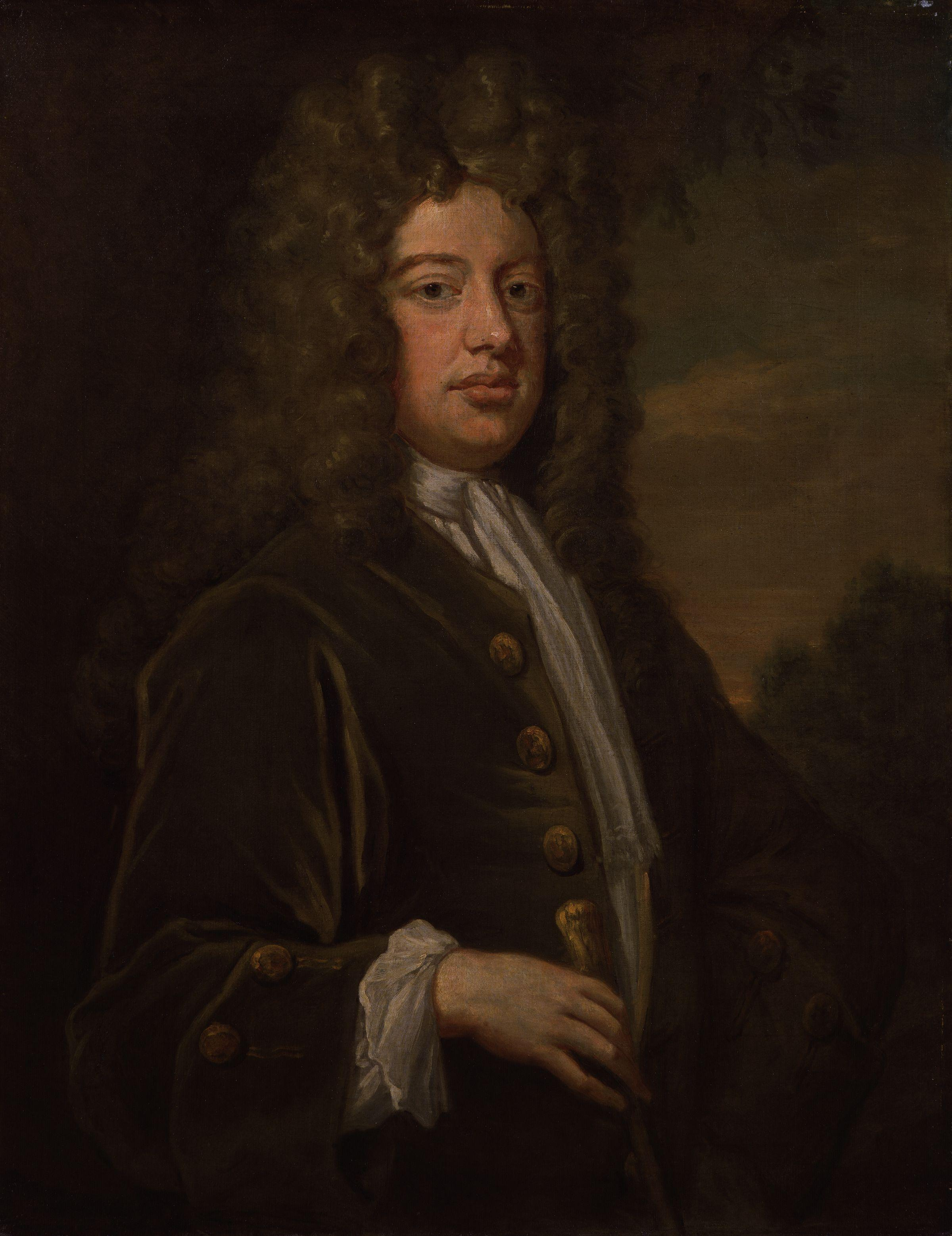
William Walsh, by Sir Godfrey Kneller, Bt.

William Walsh (6 October 1662 – 15 March 1708) of Abberley Hall, Worcestershire was an English poet and critic and a Whig politician who sat in the English and British House of Commons from 1698 to 1708.

== Life ==
Walsh was the second of eight children born to Joseph and Elizabeth Walsh of Abberley Hall. The last of his siblings, Octavia Walsh, was also, secretly, a poet. He entered Wadham College, Oxford, as a gentleman commoner in 1678. Leaving the university without a degree, he settled in his native county.

Walsh was returned MP for Worcestershire in 1698, 1701 and 1702. In 1705 he sat for Richmond, Yorkshire. On the accession of Queen Anne he was made "gentleman of the horse," a post which he held till his death, noted by Narcissus Luttrell on 18 March 1708.

== Works ==
Walsh wrote a Dialogue concerning Women, being a Defence of the Sex (1691), addressed to "Eugenia"; and Letters and Poems, Amorous and Gallant (preface dated 1692, printed in Jonson's Miscellany, 1716, and separately, 1736); love lyrics designed, says the author, to impart to the world "the faithful image of an amorous heart."

It is not as a poet, however, but as the friend and correspondent of Alexander Pope that Walsh is remembered. Pope's Pastorals were submitted for his criticism by Wycherley in 1705, and Walsh then entered on a direct correspondence with the young poet. The letters are printed in Pope's Works (ed. Elwin and Courthope, vi. 49-60). Pope, who visited him at Abberley in 1707, set great value upon his opinion. "Mr Walsh used to tell me," he says, "that there was one way left of excelling; for though we had several great poets, we never had any one great poet that was correct, and he desired me to make that my study and my aim."

The excessive eulogy accorded both by Dryden and Pope to Walsh must be accounted for partly on the ground of personal friendship. The life of Virgil prefixed to Dryden's translation, and a "Preface to the Pastorals with a short defence of Virgil, against some of the reflections of Monsieur Fontenella," both ascribed at one time to Walsh, were the work of Dr Knightly Chetwood (1650–1720). In 1704 Walsh collaborated with Sir John Vanbrugh and William Congreve in Squire Trelooby, an adaptation of Molière's farce Monsieur de Pourceaugnac. Walsh's Poems are included in Anderson's and other collections of the British poets.

== Sources ==
- Ward, Adolphus William (1899). "Walsh, William (1663-1708)" . In Lee, Sidney (ed.). Dictionary of National Biography. Vol. 59. London: Smith, Elder & Co.
- Sambrook, A. J. "Walsh, William (bap. 1662, d. 1708)". Oxford Dictionary of National Biography (online ed.). Oxford University Press. doi:10.1093/ref:odnb/28620. (Subscription, Wikipedia Library access or UK public library membership required.)

Attribution:

Parliament of England
Preceded by Thomas Foley; Edwin Sandys	Member of Parliament for Worcestershire; 1698–1701; With: Sir John Pakington, Bt	Succeeded by William Bromley; Sir John Pakington, Bt
Preceded by William Bromley; Sir John Pakington, Bt	Member of Parliament for Worcestershire; 1702–1705; With: Sir John Pakington, Bt	Succeeded by William Bromley; Sir John Pakington, Bt
Preceded by Wharton Dunch; Thomas Yorke	Member of Parliament for Richmond (Yorks.); 1705–1707; With: Thomas Yorke	Succeeded by Parliament of Great Britain
Parliament of Great Britain
Preceded by Parliament of England	Member of Parliament for Richmond (Yorks.); 1707–1708; With: Thomas Yorke	Succeeded by Harry Mordaunt; Thomas Yorke
Court offices
Preceded by Henry Ireton	Gentleman of the Horse; 1702–1708	Succeeded by Thomas Meredith
