= John Yorke (1685–1757) =

English politician

John Yorke (1685 – 1757), of Gouthwaite Hall and Richmond, Yorkshire, was an English Whig politician, who sat in the House of Commons between 1710 and 1757 with two short intervals.

Yorke was baptized on 16 December 1685, the son of Thomas Yorke (1658–1716), MP for Richmond between 1689 and 1716, and his wife Katherine Lister. He was educated at Eton College and was admitted at Peterhouse, Cambridge.

Yorke was returned as Whig member of parliament for Richmond constituency on his father's interest at the 1710 British general election. He was inactive, but voted against the French commerce bill on 18 June 1713. At the 1713 British general election he stood down in favour of his father who was expecting tough competition at Richmond. After his father's death in 1716 he was again elected as MP for Richmond at a by-election on 5 March 1717. He served as an independent Whig. He lost his seat at the 1727 British general election, but petitioned the House of Lords and was declared the winner in 1728. He retained his seat until his death.

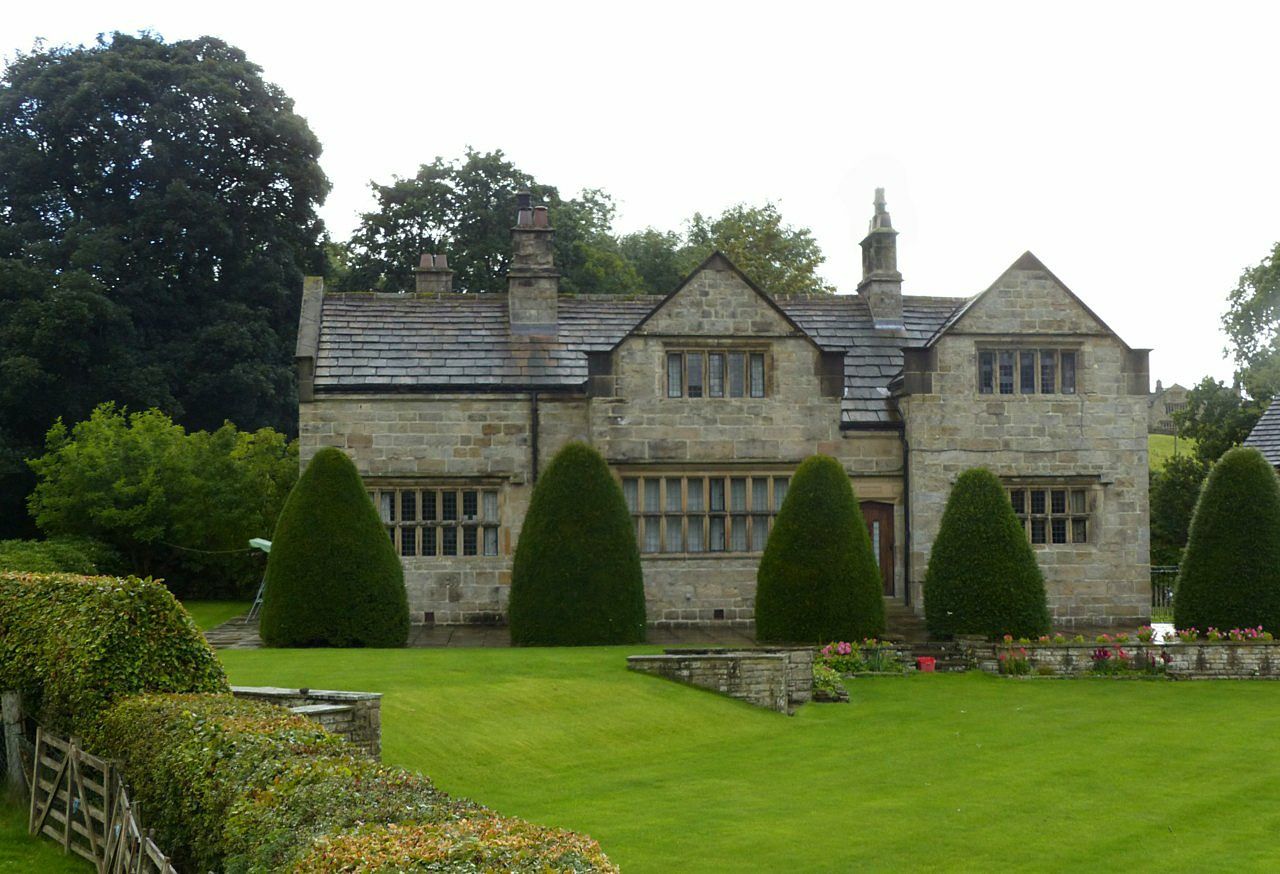
The relocated Gouthwaite Hall

On his father's death Yorke inherited the family estates in Nidderdale and Richmond. In 1732 he married Anne Darcy, daughter of James Darcy, who had served as MP for Richmond with John's father.

Yorke died childless in 1757 and was buried in Richmond parish church. The family seat of Gouthwaite Hall in Nidderdale was later submerged under Gouthwaite Reservoir, although a new Gouthwaite Hall was rebuilt before inundation with materials from the old house.

Parliament of Great Britain
Preceded by Thomas Yorke; Harry Mordaunt	Member of Parliament for Richmond; 1710–1713; With: Harry Mordaunt	Succeeded by Thomas Yorke; Harry Mordaunt
Preceded by Thomas Yorke; Harry Mordaunt	Member of Parliament for Richmond; 1717–1727; With: Harry Mordaunt 1717–1720; Richard Abell 1720–1722; Conyers Darcy 1722–1727	Succeeded by Charles Bathurst; Sir Marmaduke Wyvill, Bt.
Preceded by Charles Bathurst; Sir Marmaduke Wyvill, Bt.	Member of Parliament for Richmond; 1728–1757; With: Conyers Darcy 1728–1747; Earl of Ancram 1747–1757	Succeeded by Thomas Yorke; Earl of Ancram
