= Sir John Aubrey, 1st Baronet =

English peerage

Sir John Aubrey, 1st Baronet (c. 1606 - c. March 1679) of Llantrithyd, Glamorgan was an English landowner.

== Life ==
He was the son of Sir Thomas Aubrey and Mary Mansell. He matriculated at Wadham College, Oxford on 3 November 1626, at the age of 20. He was created 1st Baronet Aubrey, of Llantrithyd, Glamorgan, on 23 July 1660. He died in about March 1679 and was buried at Llantrithyd in Glamorgan, Wales on 25 March 1679.

== Marriage and issue ==
At some time before 1650 he married Mary South (d.1680), by whom he had issue:

- Sir John Aubrey, 2nd Baronet, only surviving son and heir;
- Mary Aubrey (d.10 March 1700), the second wife of William Montagu (1618-1706), Chief Baron of the Exchequer.
