= Charles Bathurst =

Charles Bathurst may refer to:

- Charles Bathurst (MP, born 1754) (1754–1831), British member of parliament
- Charles Bathurst, 1st Viscount Bledisloe (1867–1958), British politician and governor-general of New Zealand
- Charles Bathurst (MP, died 1743) (c. 1703–1743), British member of parliament
