= Wyvill =

Wyvill is a surname and may refer to:

- Sir Christopher Wyvill, 3rd Baronet (1614–1681), English politician
- Christopher Wyvill (reformer) (1740–1822), English political reformer
- Marmaduke Wyvill (disambiguation)
- Shaun Wyvill, Irish rugby league player
- Wyvill baronets

== See also ==
- Wyville, a village in Lincolnshire, England
