= Gentleman of the Horse =

Position in the British Royal Court

Gentleman of the Horse was a position in the stables department of the British Royal Court, subordinate only to the Master of the Horse. It existed from 1693 until abolished in 1782, and carried a salary of £256.

The post was revived in 1828, with a salary of £500. The title of the post was subsequently changed to Crown Equerry.

== List of Gentlemen of the Horse ==
=== Before 1782 ===
- 1691–1702: Henry Ireton
- 1702–1708: William Walsh
- 1708–1710: Thomas Meredyth
- 1710–1717: Conyers Darcy
- 1717–1736: Hon. Henry Berkeley
- 1737–1746: Hon. James Brudenell
- 1747–1760: Hon. William Keppel
- 1760–1782: Richard Berenger

Post abolished in 1782

=== After 1828 ===
Post revived in 1828

- 1828–1830: Emilius Henry Delmé-Radcliffe
- 1830–1837: Lord Frederick FitzClarence
