= John Benbow (explorer) =

John Benbow (c. 1682 – 17 November 1708) was an English traveller, who wrote an early account of Madagascar after running aground and being captured there.

He was the son of Vice-Admiral John Benbow. On 29 June 1696, he was appointed a volunteer on board HMS Northumberland. He did not, however, remain long in the navy, and in February 1700-1 sailed for the East Indies as fourth mate of the Degrave, a merchant ship. As his father was at this time commander-in-chief in the Downs, and was a few months later appointed commander-in-chief in the West Indies, and thus had it in his power to advance him in the navy, it is difficult to avoid the conclusion that there was some breach between the two.

The Degrave, a ship of 700 tons, duly arrived in Bengal, where the captain and first mate died and thus, in ordinary course, Benbow was second mate when she started for her homeward voyage. In going out of the river the ship grounded heavily, and though she was got off without difficulty, and, as it was believed, without damage, she was scarcely well to sea, with a fresh northerly monsoon, before she was found to be leaking badly. With the pumps going constantly they reached Mauritius in a couple of months, but with a singular rashness started again for the Cape without having even discovered the leak. The ship, coming into a more stormy sea, was in imminent danger of sinking, and the captain, officers, and ship's company determined to make for the nearest land, which was the south end of Madagascar. There they ran the ship ashore; she became a complete wreck, little or nothing was saved, and the men got to land with considerable difficulty. They were almost immediately made prisoners by the natives. Benbow, together with two or three of his companions, managed to escape; he reached Fort Dauphin, and was eventually rescued by a Dutch ship and brought home. The rest of the ship's company were killed, (Note: Not all the Degrave's other crew were lost: a handful of the Degrave's castaways were later picked up by pirate John Halsey when he stopped his brigantine Charles nearby to replenish its water and food supplies.) with the exception of one boy, Robert Drury, then fifteen years old, who, after fifteen years' captivity, was rescued by an English ship, and spent the rest of his life as porter in a London warehouse. We may suppose that Benbow's constitution was broken by the hardships of his savage life; he seems to have lived for a few years at Deptford, in very humble circumstances, and died on 17 November 1708. Before he died he spoke in support of a plan by John Breholt to obtain a pardon for the Madagascar pirates so they might return to England with their riches; a year after Benbow died, the plan was discredited when it came to light that Breholt was himself a former pirate.

He had written some account of Madagascar which remained in manuscript, and was accidentally burnt in 1714. It had, however, been seen by several, and the hazy recollections of it, together with Drury's story, were worked up, not improbably by Daniel Defoe, and published under Drury's name with the title of 'Madagascar, or Robert Drury's Journal during Fifteen Years' Captivity on that Island' (1729).
