= Penelope Aubin =

English novelist, poet, and translator

Penelope Aubin (c. 1679 – 1738?) was an English novelist, poet, and translator. Aubin's works have a long history after her death, being both plagiarised and published transatlantically. She is one of a number of eighteenth-century women writers whose works and biography are being more rigorously explored by modern scholars.

== Life ==
Penelope Aubin née Charleton's exact birth date remains unknown; she was the illegitimate daughter of Sir Richard Temple of Stowe and Anne Charleton, most likely born in London around 1679. Her mother Anne was the daughter of the physician and natural philosopher Walter Charleton. While scholars in the past had theorized from the 'evidence' of her novels that she was both Catholic and Huguenot, more recently her biographers, Debbie Welham and Joel H. Baer, have identified that her husband's family were from Jersey in the Channel Islands with Huguenot links, her Charleton roots were English and staunchly Anglican.

Aubin married her husband, Abraham Aubin, without the permission of either set of parents in 1696, and they had three children: Marie, Abraham, and Penelope. None outlived their parents. Aubin managed the family business while her husband, a merchant, fought in Queen Anne's wars (he gives a description of his military career in Aubin's obituary). Meanwhile, Aubin was approached by former pirate John Breholt in a scheme to raise a petition in support of the repatriation of the pirates of Madagascar (and their wealth) to England. She declined to do so. Her 1709 testimony to the Board of Trade enquiry regarding Breholt's plans helped discredit him.

Aubin first published poetry in 1707. She next turned to novels, publishing seven between 1721 and 1728. She also translated French works in the 1720s, and wrote a play in 1730. In a Lady's Oratory in 1729, she spoke publicly on moral and political issues.

Aubin died in April 1738, survived by her husband until his death in April 1740. After the author's death, her works were gathered and published as A Collection of Entertaining Histories and Novels, Designed to Promote the Cause of Virtue and Honor.

== Works ==
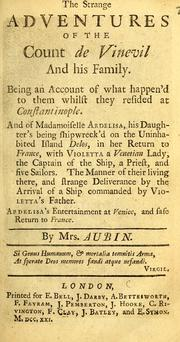
Title page for The Strange Adventures of the Count de Vinevil

- The Stuarts : A Pindarique Ode (1707)
- The Extasy: A Pindarick Ode to Her Majesty The Queen (1708)
- The Wellcome : A Poem to his Grace the Duke of Marlborough (1708)
- The strange adventures of the Count de Vinevil and his family. Being an account of what happen'd to them whilst they resided at Constantinople (1721)
- The life of Madam de Beaumount, a French lady; who lived in a cave in Wales above fourteen years undiscovered, being forced to fly to France for her religion; ... Also her lord's adventures in Muscovy (1721)
- The Life and Amorous Adventures of Lucinda (1721)
- The Doctrine of Morality (1721). Translation by T.M. Gibbs of M. De Gomberville. Republished in 1726 as Moral Virtue Delineated.
- The Noble Slaves: Or the Lives and Adventures of Two Lords and Two Ladies (1722)
- The Adventures of the Prince of Clermont, and Madam De Ravezan (1722). Translation of Mme Gillot De Beaucour.
  - Anne de Sola has edited a modern (2003) critical edition: ISBN 0-7734-6610-X
- History of Genghizcan the Great (1722). Translation of M. François Pétis de la Croix.
- The Life of Charlotta Du Pont, an English lady; taken from her own memoirs (1723). Online edition at www.chawton.org and PDF
- The Life and Adventures of the Lady Lucy (1726)
- The Illustrious French Lovers (1726). Translation of Les Illustres Françaises by Robert Challe
  - Anna de Sola has edited a modern (2000) critical edition: ISBN 0-7734-7701-2
- The Life and Adventures of The Young Count Albertus, The Son of Count Lewis Augustus, by the Lady Lucy (1728)
- The Life of the Countess de Gondez (1729). Translation.
- The Merry Masqueraders; or The Humorous Cuckold (1732)
- A Collection of Entertaining Histories and Novels, Designed to Promote the Cause of Virtue and Honor (1739)
  - Vol. I
  - Vol. II
  - Vol. III
- The Inhuman Stepmother, or the History of Miss Harriot Montague (1770 edition available as a PDF from Chawton House)
