= Halton West =

Village and civil parish in North Yorkshire, England

Coordinates: 53.985180°N 2.239380°W

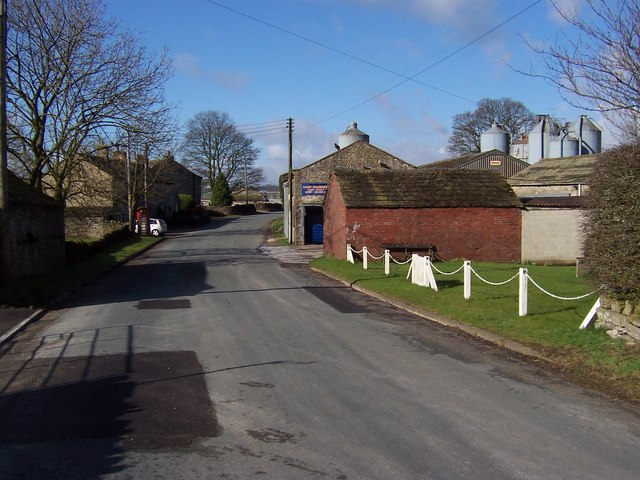
- Road through the village

- Location within North Yorkshire
- Population: 70
- OS grid reference: SD844543
- Civil parish: Halton West
- Unitary authority: North Yorkshire
- Ceremonial county: North Yorkshire
- Region: Yorkshire and the Humber
- Country: England
- Sovereign state: United Kingdom
- Post town: SKIPTON
- Postcode district: BD23
- Police: North Yorkshire
- Fire: North Yorkshire
- Ambulance: Yorkshire

Halton West is a village and civil parish in the county of North Yorkshire, England. North Yorkshire County Council estimated the population in 2015 at 70. It is situated on the River Ribble and is 7 miles (11 km) north of Barnoldswick, 7 miles (11 km) south of Settle and 12 miles (19 km) west of Skipton.

The place was first recorded in about 1200 as Halton. The name is derived from the Old English halh 'nook' and tūn 'farm or village', so means 'farm or village in or by a nook'. "West" was added to distinguish the village from another Halton, now Halton East, 12 miles (19 km) to the east.

Halton West, historically also known as West Halton, was a township in the ancient parish of Long Preston in the West Riding of Yorkshire. It became a civil parish in 1866, and in 1974 was transferred to the new county of North Yorkshire. From 1974 to 2023 it was part of the Craven District, it is now administered by the unitary North Yorkshire Council.

== Halton Place ==
Halton Place is a large country house just east of the village. It was built in 1770 by Thomas Yorke (1738-1811), whose father Thomas Yorke (1688–1768) had acquired the estate in 1732. It remains in the Yorke family to the present day. It was designated a Grade II listed building in 1958.

== See also ==
- Listed buildings in Halton West
