= Robert Drury (sailor) =

English sailor

- Born: 24 July 1687; Tower Hamlets, London, England
- Died: unknown
- Occupations: Sailor, slave merchant, slave

Robert Drury (born 1687; died between 1743 and 1750) was an English sailor on the Degrave who was shipwrecked at the age of 17 on the island of Madagascar. He was trapped there for fifteen years.

Upon returning to England, a book allegedly recounting his memoirs was published in his name in 1729. Though it was an instant success, the authenticity of the book would be questioned by later historians.

Modern scholars have proven though that many details in the book are authentic and that the story itself is one of the oldest written historical accounts of life in southern Madagascar during the 18th century.

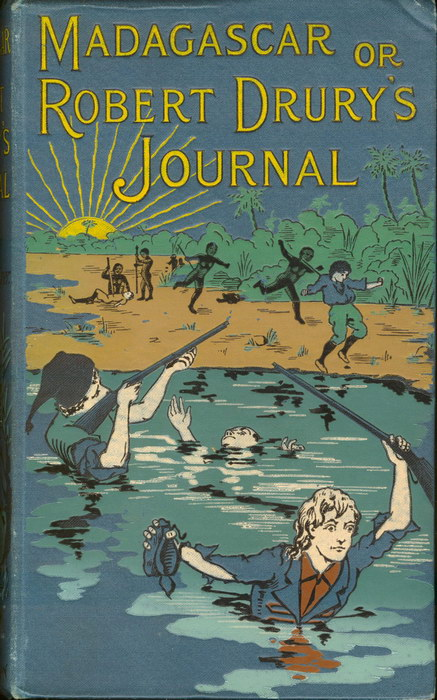
Robert Drury's Journal 1897

== Early life ==
Robert was born at Crutched Friars in the Tower Hamlets area of London and later moved to the Old Jewry near Cheapside, where his father ran an Inn called The King's Head. At the age of thirteen his father secured passage for him on the ship Degrave headed for India.

== Shipwrecked and marooned ==
=== The Degrave ===
The Degrave left port in February 1701 reaching India safely four months later. On the return voyage it ran aground near Mauritius, and the crew was forced to abandon ship in Madagascar on the southernmost tip of the island, having not reached the Cape of Good Hope. The local Antandroy king Andriankirindra gave the sailors a fine welcome, but intended on keeping them captive to increase his standing among the other Antandroy kings.

=== Adventures With the Antandroy ===
The now captive sailors attempted to escape Andriankririndra to the east where Abraham Samuel, a black native of Martinique, reigned over the Antanosy tribes near what is now Fort-Dauphin. The first mate John Benbow and a few others were able to escape but most of the surviving crew were killed in the attempt. A couple of youths, Drury included, were spared and recaptured. Robert was then given to the king Andriamivaro as his slave.

A reluctant slave at first, Robert eventually moved his way up from agricultural work and beekeeping to become a cow herd and eventually the royal butcher. He stayed there for what seems to have been 10 years. In the following years war broke out with the neighbouring ethnicity to the west, the Mahafaly. This was followed by a fratricidal civil war between Andriamivaro, and his uncles and cousins which included the High King of the Androy. An emissary from the Sakalava king of Fiherenana (part of the Menabe kingdom) broke the civil war by proposing a joint attack against the Mahafaly. This emissary also spoke to Drury, convincing him that if he fled to Fiherenana they would help him on to the first British ship they found.

Robert then escaped and found refuge with Andrianafarana, a rival Antandroy king. He then fled from this master as well and, travelling north through Bara country, he found the Onilahy river and followed it to St Augustine's bay, now the city of Toliara in south-west Madagascar, and the capital of the Fiherenana.

=== Surviving on the West Coast ===
Upon reaching the west coast, Robert was able to meet and socialise with a community of stowaways both black and white. After further warring between his new masters, the Antandroy allies and their Mahafaly enemies, Drury was forced to find refuge further north, this time in the court of the legendary Andriamanetriarivo, king of Menabe, brother of the great king Andriamandisoarivo of the Boina. These two brothers built kingdoms which would dominate most of the island from the west coast well into the interior.

Eventually, through his new European friends, news would return to his father who asked a certain Captain Mackett to go to the coast to have him returned to England on his ship, the Masselage. This ship's primary goal though was to buy slaves from the Boina Kingdom in north-west Madagascar.

== Later life and journal ==
Robert arrived in England finally on 9 September 1717 after sixteen years. Unfortunately his parents were already dead. He then returned to Madagascar to become a slave trader. He may have even eventually also become a pirate for some time. In the end though he was known to be a common porter at East India House. He was said also to hang out at Old Tom's Coffee House in Birchin Lane telling tales of his adventures in Madagascar.

Drury published his memoirs under the title Madagascar, or Robert Drury's Journal in 1729. It was highly praised at the time and went through seven editions until 1890. But suspicion began to rise concerning its authenticity due to its paraphrasing of many parts of the book on the History of Madagascar by Etienne de Flacourt in 1658. Also, Drury had the same publisher as Daniel Defoe and what some analysts found to be a similar writing style. Many authorities who know the Androy and Mahafaly regions well are convinced though that the story proves its creator had a very intimate knowledge of the region. These include :

- Dr Lotte Schomerus-Gernbock (1970), an ethnologist who lived a number of years in the Mahafaly region.
- Raymond K. Kent, Professor of History, University of California, Berkeley.
- Mike Parker Pearson (1996), archaeologist at Sheffield University. He has argued for the authenticity of Drury's Journal.

Among the most important works was that of Mike P. Pearson, who found archaeological evidence of many parts of Drury's account. These discoveries are described in his book In Search of the Red Slave.

Other researchers conclude that Drury's book was based partially on the work of Flacourt and others, but primarily on the journal of John Benbow, fellow sailor on the Degrave and son of Admiral Benbow. Benbow escaped to Fort Dauphin and sailed home aboard a Dutch ship; a few other Degrave survivors were picked up by pirate John Halsey. Benbow penned a journal of his experiences, which was lost in a 1714 fire but may have been seen by Defoe.

Robert Drury died sometime between the third (1743) and fourth (1750) editions of his Journal.

== See also ==
- List of slaves
