= Richard Berenger =

18th Century English Courtier and Equestrian

Richard Berenger (died 1782) was an English courtier and writer, Gentleman of the Horse to George III of Great Britain.

== Life ==
His father was Moses Berenger, a rich London merchant; his mother was Penelope, youngest sister of Richard Temple, 1st Viscount Cobham. He outlived his means, and for some years had confine himself to his official residence in the King's Mews, then a privileged place against the demands of bailiffs. Mainly through the financial support of David Garrick, a settlement was made with his creditors.

Berenger died in the King's Mews, London, 9 September 1782.

== Reputation ==
Samuel Johnson once styled Berenger the "standard of true elegance"; but a more general feelings was that he resembled too closely the gentleman of William Congreve's comedies. Hannah More styled him "everybody's favourite", and summed up his character as "all chivalry, and blank verse, and anecdote".

== Works ==
Both of Berenger's books dealt with the horse and rider. The first, A new System of Horsemanship, appeared in 1754, and was a translation from the French of Claude Bourgelat. The second, The History and Art of Horsemanship, was published in 1771 in two volumes, and contained considerable historical information still not without interest to the student. Minor poems by Berenger were in Robert Dodsley's collection (vi. 271–6); and three essays, with a short poem on the Birthday of Shakespeare, were contributed by him to the periodical called The World, which was included in editions of the "British Essayists".

== Notes ==
Court offices
Preceded by William Keppel	Gentleman of the Horse; 1760–1782	Office abolished
