= Baron Darcy of Navan =

Baron Darcy of Navan, in the County of Meath, was a title in the Peerage of Ireland. It was created on 13 September 1721 for James Darcy, previously Member of Parliament for Richmond, Yorkshire, with remainder to the heirs male of his daughter, the Honourable Mary Darcy. He was the son of James Darcy, younger son of Conyers Darcy, 7th Baron Darcy de Knayth (see Baron Darcy de Knayth for earlier history of the family). He was succeeded according to the special remainder by his grandson, James, the second Baron. He was the son of the Honourable Mary by her husband William Jessop. Born James Jessop, the second Baron assumed the surname of Darcy in lieu of his patronymic. He never married and the title became extinct on his early death in 1733.

== Barons Darcy of Navan (1721) ==
- James Darcy, 1st Baron Darcy of Navan (1650–1731)
- James Darcy, 2nd Baron Darcy of Navan (1707–1733)

== See also ==
- Baron Darcy de Knayth
