= Listed buildings in Halton East =

Halton East is a civil parish in the county of North Yorkshire, England. It contains seven listed buildings that are recorded in the National Heritage List for England. All the listed buildings are designated at Grade II, the lowest of the three grades, which is applied to "buildings of national importance and special interest". The parish contains the village of Halton East and the surrounding countryside. All the listed buildings are in the village, and consist of houses, cottages, a barn and a farmhouse.

== Buildings ==
Name and location	Photograph	Date	Notes
White House Farmhouse; 53.98173°N 1.93572°W	—	1620	Most of the farmhouse dates from the mid-19th century. It is in stone with a stone slate roof, two storeys and six bays. On the garden front is a two-storey gabled porch, its entrance with a chamfered surround and a dated and initialled lintel. At the far left is a segmental-arched wagon entrance. Some windows are mullioned, some are sashes, and here is a French window.
Halton Hall; 53.98167°N 1.93967°W		Mid 17th century	The house is in stone and has a stone slate roof. There are two storeys and a square plan, with fronts of two bays. The central doorway has a chamfered surround and a basket arched lintel. The windows are double-chamfered, with mullions, transoms and hood moulds. Inside, there is a large inglenook fireplace.
Sunnyside Cottage; 53.98203°N 1.93455°W		Mid 17th century	The cottage is in stone, and has a stone slate roof with a shaped kneeler on the left. There are two storeys and two bays. The doorway on the left has a chamfered surround and a flat arched lintel. The windows are chamfered and mullioned, those in the ground floor with hood moulds.
Fern Cottage; 53.98169°N 1.93712°W		c. 1700	The cottage is in stone, and has a stone slate roof with a coped gable and a shaped kneeler on the right. There are two storeys and one bay. The doorway on the left has a chamfered surround and a decorated lintel. The windows are mullioned with some mullions missing, and the ground floor window has a hood mould.
The Fold; 53.98110°N 1.93427°W		1704	A house later divided into two, in stone with a stone slate roof and a kneeler on the left. There are two storeys and three bays, the left bay recessed. The doorway has a chamfered surround and a dated and initialled basket arch. The windows are chamfered and mullioned, some with hood moulds.
Bramham Cottage and barn 53.98166°N 1.93781°W	—	Late 18th century	The cottage and barn are in stone, and have a stone slate roof with gable copings and shaped kneelers. There are two storeys and three bays. The doorway has a plain surround, and the windows are mullioned, containing casements and fixed lights.
Dyneley House; 53.98166°N 1.93547°W	—	Late 18th century	The house was extended in about 1820 with the addition of a parallel range. It is in stone with a hipped slate roof, and has two storeys. The earlier part has a full-height canted bay, the later part has two bays. Most of the windows are sashes, and there are two tripartite windows.
