= Listed buildings in Constable Burton =

Constable Burton is a civil parish in the county of North Yorkshire, England. It contains 16 listed buildings that are recorded in the National Heritage List for England. Of these, one is listed at Grade I, the highest of the three grades, one is at Grade II*, the middle grade, and the others are at Grade II, the lowest grade. The parish contains the village of Constable Burton and the surrounding countryside. The most important building in the parish is Constable Burton Hall, which is listed, together with associated structures in its grounds and park. Most of the other listed buildings are houses, cottages, farmhouses and farm buildings, and the rest include a mill and a mill house, a bridge, a former school and a milepost.

== Key ==
Grade	Criteria
I	Buildings of exceptional interest, sometimes considered to be internationally important
II*	Particularly important buildings of more than special interest
II	Buildings of national importance and special interest

== Buildings ==
Name and location	Photograph	Date	Notes	Grade
Cragg Farmhouse; 54.31845°N 1.74169°W		14th century (possible)	The farmhouse, which has been altered, is in sandstone, with quoins, and an artificial stone slate roof with stone coping on the right. There are two storeys, three bays, and a two-storey outshut with a flat roof. Most of the windows are casements, and the doorway at the rear has a chamfered quoined surround.	II
Studdah Farmhouse; 54.31274°N 1.77915°W	—	16th century (possible)	The farmhouse, which was extended in the 19th century with the addition of a cross-wing, is in sandstone with quoins, stone slate roofs and two storeys. The original range has three bays, it includes courses of slate, it is on a plinth, and the roof has stone coping on the left and is hipped on the right. In the centre is a doorway with a segmental head, a chamfered surround, and a hood mould. To its left is a sash window with a chamfered surround, and the other windows are casements. The cross-wing has three bays, a hipped roof, sash windows, and a doorway with a fanlight.	II
Mill Hill and outbuilding 54.31218°N 1.74101°W	—	Early 18th century	The house and outbuilding are in sandstone, the house with a hipped roof of stone slate, and the outbuilding with a slate roof. The house has quoins, two storeys, three bays, and a rear outshut. There is a central doorway, one sash window with a double-chamfered surround, and the other windows are mullioned and double-chamfered. In the outbuilding is a stable door.	II
Park House; 54.31660°N 1.76983°W	—	Early to mid 18th century	The farmhouse is in stone, with quoins, a hipped roof in artificial stone slate. There are two storeys and three bays. The doorway is in the centre, and the windows on the front are sashes, mostly tripartite. At the rear are three-light double-chamfered windows and a tall stair window with a quoined surround.	II
Constable Burton Hall; 54.31611°N 1.75004°W		1762–67	A country house designed by John Carr in Palladian style, it is in sandstone on a plinth, with a sill band, a modillion cornice and hipped Westmorland slate roofs. There are two storeys and a basement, and an entrance front of five bays. The middle three bays are recessed behind a portico with four giant unfluted Ionic columns, a frieze and a pediment, and is approached by an imperial staircase. The windows are sashes, those in the basement with Gibbs surrounds. In the upper floors they have architraves, those in the lower floor with pulvinated friezes, pediments on consoles, and balustraded aprons. At the rear are seven bays with a central three-bay canted full height bay window, and the left return has seven bays, the middle three projecting under a pediment.	I
Coach house and stables, Constable Burton Hall; 54.31664°N 1.75052°W	—	c. 1765	The coach house and stables, designed by John Carr, are in stone with a moulded cornice and a stone slate roof. The coach house has two storeys, and in the ground floor is a three-bay arcade of round arches. Above are three shuttered openings with segmental arches, and a hipped roof. The stable block has a single storey and quoins on the left, and it contains two windows with segmental arches, and a doorway with a segmental arch and a fanlight.	II*
Laundry block, Constable Burton Hall; 54.31642°N 1.75019°W	—	c. 1765	The laundry block to the north of the hall is in sandstone on a plinth, with a floor band, cornice bands, and hipped stone slate roofs. The central block has two storeys and two bays, flanked by single-storey three-bay wings. It contains sash windows, and the entrances are in the returns.	II
St Andrew's Cottage; 54.31359°N 1.74629°W	—	1765	The house, which was refurbished in the 19th century, is in sandstone, and has a stone slate roof with gable coping and a shaped kneeler on the left. There are two storeys and two bays. On the front, the doorway is to the left, the windows are sashes, and all the openings have flat arches with voussoirs and keystones. At the rear is a window with an initialled and dated keystone.	II
Classical Bridge; 54.31504°N 1.74812°W	—	18th century	The bridge in Constable Burton Park is in sandstone, and consists of a single segmental arch. It has rusticated voussoirs and spandrels, parapets with square-plan turned balusters, and pedestal terminals. There is a rectangular overflow channel to the east.	II
Cottage to west of St Andrew's Cottage; 54.31359°N 1.74643°W	—	Mid to late 18th century	The cottage is in sandstone, with quoins, and a stone slate roof with stone coping on the left. There are two storeys and two bays. The central doorway has a stone surround with impost blocks, and the windows are horizontally-sliding sashes.	II
Constable Burton Mill and mill house 54.31291°N 1.74212°W	—	Late 18th century	The watermill and mill house are in stone with quoins and stone slate roofs. They consist of a mill of three storeys, the cornmill in the first two bays, and the sawmill in the third bay, in front of which is a single-storey annex, and at the rear is an outshut containing an overshot waterwheel. To the right is an older mill with two storeys, and the two-storey mill house with two bays, an outshut, and a single-storey rear extension.	II
Deer Barn; 54.31410°N 1.75319°W	—	Late 18th century	The building in Constable Burton Park, which was possibly a deer shelter, and later used for other purposes, is in stone with quoins and a stone slate roof. There is a hexagonal plan and a single storey. On the east side are doorways, and the other sides contain inserted windows, three of them also with slit vents.	II
Ice house 54.31694°N 1.75361°W		Late 18th century	The ice house in Constable Burton Park is in stone and brick. It has a circular plan, it is set into the ground, and has a hemispherical vaulted roof. The doorway leads to a brick barrel vaulted tunnel.	II
Constable Burton Bridge; 54.31424°N 1.74591°W	—	Early to mid 19th century	The bridge carries the A684 road over Burton Beck. It is in rusticated stone, and consists of a single horseshoe arch. The bridge has a band, and parapets with rounded coping, and is flanked by terminal pilasters.	II
Former school 54.31349°N 1.74571°W		1839	The former school is in rusticated sandstone, with quoins, and a Welsh slate roof with gable copings and shaped kneelers. There is a single storey and two bays. In the centre is a gabled porch with a bellcote on the gable, containing a doorway with a four-centred arched head, above which is a dated plaque. The windows have four-centred arched heads.	II
Milepost; 54.31561°N 1.73917°W	—	Late 19th century	The milepost on the north side of Conyers Lane (A684 road) is in cast iron, and has a triangular plan. On the top is inscribed "LEYBURN H D", and on the sides are pointing hands, with the distance to Bedale on the left side and to Leyburn on the right side.	II
