= Listed buildings in Halton West =

Halton West is a civil parish in the county of North Yorkshire, England. It contains nine listed buildings that are recorded in the National Heritage List for England. All the listed buildings are designated at Grade II, the lowest of the three grades, which is applied to "buildings of national importance and special interest". The parish contains the village of Halton West and the surrounding countryside. Apart from a bridge, all the listed buildings are houses, cottages, farmhouses and associated structures.

== Buildings ==
Name and location	Photograph	Date	Notes
Auld Hall; 53.98625°N 2.23846°W		Early 17th century	The farmhouse is in stone with a stone slate roof, two storeys and three bays. The central bay is recessed, the left bay dates from the 18th century, and its gable end faces the road, and the right bay is an outshut. In the central bay is a doorway with a chamfered surround and a segmental pointed lintel. The windows are chamfered with moulded mullions, and contain 20th-century casements.
High Scale Farmhouse; 53.99427°N 2.26442°W		c. 1660	The farmhouse is in stone with eaves modillions and a stone slate roof. There are two storeys, four bays, and a stair turret and a kitchen extension at the rear. On the front are two doorways, one with a plain surround, the other with a moulded surround and a basket arch. Most of the windows are chamfered with moulded mullions, and contain 20th-century casements.
The Stores; 53.98482°N 2.24011°W		Mid to late 17th century	Two cottages and a barn, later a house and an office, in stone with a stone slate roof. There are two storeys and four bays, and lean-to extensions. The left doorway has a plain surround, the central doorway has a chamfered lintel, and the right doorway has a chamfered surround and a segmental pointed lintel. Some windows are mullioned, some are casements, and others have fixed lights.
Halton Bridge; 53.99244°N 2.22755°W		Mid 18th century	The bridge carries Hellifield Road over the River Ribble. It is in stone and consists of three larger arches and two smaller arches to the north, all segmental. There are three cutwaters with triangular caps, ten pilasters, and ten bollards on the roadway corresponding to the pilasters. The parapet is coped, and at its base is a string course.
Rose Cottage; 53.98676°N 2.23580°W		Mid to late 18th century	The cottage is in stone, partly rendered, with painted stone dressings and a stone slate roof. There are two storeys and two bays. The central doorway has a plain surround, and the windows have two lights with flat-faced mullions, and contain casements.
Halton Place; 53.98943°N 2.22772°W	—	1770	A large house designed by John Crunden, in rendered brick with stone dressings, sill bands, and a slate roof. There are three storeys and three bays, and lower flanking single bays, all pedimented. In the centre is a recessed Tuscan porch with two columns and two pilasters, an entablature, and an entrance with a moulded surround, above which is a string course and a coat of arms. Most of the windows are sashes, and in the central pediment is a lunette window. To the left is a service wing with two storeys and two bays, and at the rear is a later extension with two storeys and four bays, containing a billiards room.
Estate outbuildings, Halton Place; 53.98919°N 2.22955°W	—	Late 18th century	A former laundry, stables and carriage houses, converted into three cottages and stores, in stone with stone slate roofs. The building consists of three two-storey single-bay pavilions with pyramidal roofs, linked by two single-storey ranges of four bays with shaped eaves modillions. The central pavilion contains a carriage entrance with a segmental arch., above which is a family crest. To the right is a later extension with two storeys and four bays.
Kitchen garden walls, Halton Place; 53.98883°N 2.22923°W	—	Late 18th century	The kitchen garden is enclosed by walls, on the east side in stone, and on the west side in brick. The entrance has a segmental arch, over which is a coat of arms on a shield. The parapets are stepped, and on them are two statues of reclining whippets.
Cow Hill Farmhouse; 53.98886°N 2.25153°W		c. 1830	The farmhouse is in stone, with eaves modillions, and a stone slate roof with a kneeler and coping on the right. There are two storeys and three bays. The central doorway has a plain surround and a moulded hood. The windows are sashes with plain surrounds, and in the right return is a round-headed staircase window.
