= Sir Marmaduke Wyvill, 6th Baronet =

British landowner and politician

Sir Marmaduke Wyvill, 6th Baronet (1692–1754), of Constable Burton Hall, Yorkshire, was a British landowner and politician who sat in the House of Commons briefly from 1727 to 1728.

Wyvill was the son of Sir Marmaduke Wyvill, 5th Baronet MP of Constable Burton, Yorkshire, and his wife Henrietta Maria Yarburgh, daughter of Sir Thomas Yarburgh of Balne Hall and Snaith, Yorkshire. He married Carey Coke, daughter of Edward Coke of Holkham, Norfolk in 1716.

Wyvill stood unsuccessfully for Richmond in 1713 and 1715. At the 1722 British general election he was forbidden by his father to stand because Lord Sunderland disapproved. He succeeded his father to the baronetcy on 2 November 1722. He was finally elected for Richmond at the 1727 British general election with Charles Bathurst. Their friend the mayor, who was returning officer, allowed a large number of unqualified persons to vote for them. On petition the seats were awarded to their opponents on 14 March 1728. In 1736, Wyvill's brother-in-law, Thomas Coke, 1st Earl of Leicester, the English postmaster general, appointed him postmaster general of Ireland, which disqualified him from sitting in the House of Commons.

He was elected a Fellow of the Royal Society in 1735.

Wyvill died without issue on 27 December 1754. He was succeeded in the baronetcy by his nephew Marmaduke Asty Wyvill.

Parliament of Great Britain
| Preceded by John Yorke; Conyers Darcy | Member of Parliament for Richmond; 1727–1728; With: Charles Bathurst | Succeeded by John Yorke; Sir Conyers Darcy |
Baronetage of England
| Preceded by Marmaduke Wyvill | Baronet (of Constable Burton); 1722–1754 | Succeeded by Marmaduke Wyvill |
