= Constable Burton Hall =

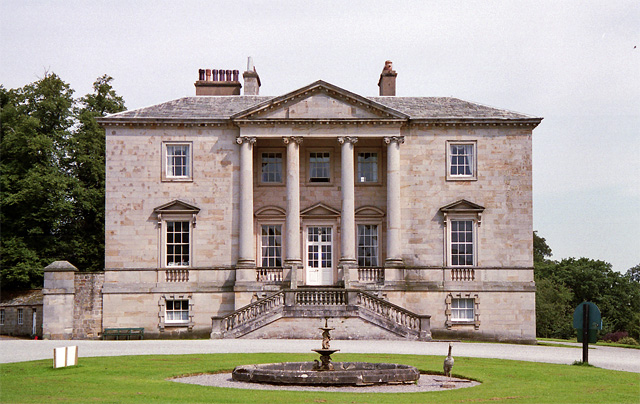
- Constable Burton Hall Portico Front

- Location within North Yorkshire
- 54°18′58″N 1°45′00″W
- Type: Country house
- Location: Constable Burton, North Yorkshire

History
- Built: 1762–1767
- Built for: Sir Marmaduke Wyvill

Site notes
- Architect: John Carr
- Architectural style: Palladian
- Website: constableburton.com

Listed Building – Grade I
- Official name: Constable Burton Hall
- Designated: 13 February 1967
- Reference no.: 1131472

Listed Building – Grade II*
- Official name: Coach House and Stables of Constable Burton Hall
- Designated: 13 February 1967
- Reference no.: 1318295

National Register of Historic Parks and Gardens
- Official name: Constable Burton Hall
- Designated: 10 May 1984
- Reference no.: 1001060

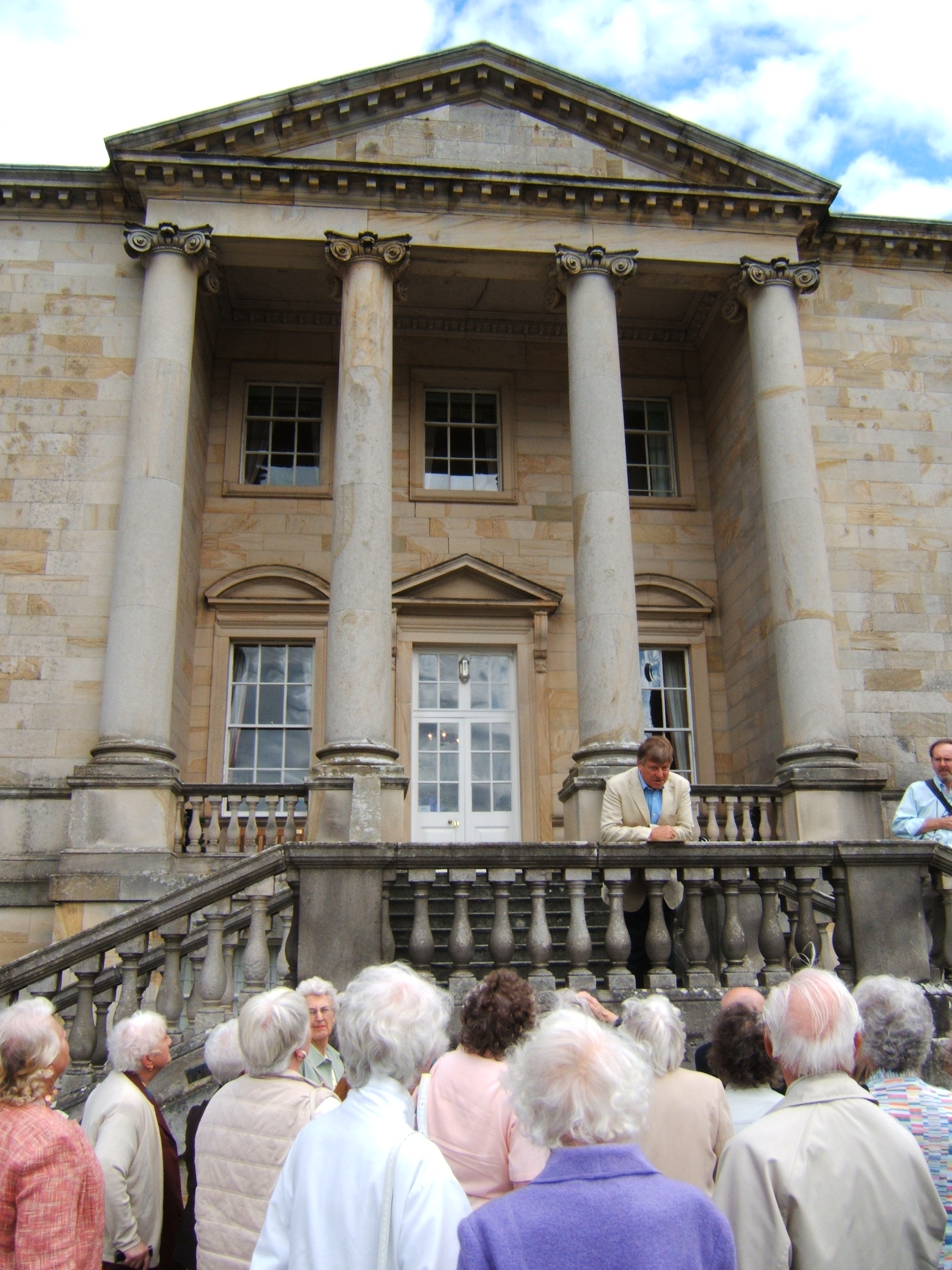
Marmaduke D'Arcy Wyvill on the steps of Constable Burton Hall

Constable Burton Hall is a Grade I-listed Georgian country house of dressed stone in an extensive and well wooded park in the village of Constable Burton in North Yorkshire, designed by John Carr of York in 1768. It is privately owned by the Wyvill family. The house is a two-storey ashlar-faced structure with a five bay frontage having an elegant recessed Ionic portico. The principal entrance is approached by a double flight of steps. The side elevation has a pediment and there is a large projecting bay to the rear of the house.

The house was listed Grade I in 1967, with the coach house and stables, and the laundry listed as Grade II* and Grade II respectively at the same time. In 1984, the park was listed as Grade II on the National Register of Historic Parks and Gardens. The pub in the village is called The Wyvill Arms. The house and gardens are private.

== History ==
The estate came into the Wyvill (sometimes Wyvell) family by marriage in the reign of Edward VI. In 1611 Marmaduke Wyvill was created a baronet. The house then passed down to the 7th Baronet, also Sir Marmaduke Wyvill, who in 1768 commissioned John Carr of York to remodel the Elizabethan H-plan house in the Palladian style.

Marmaduke Wyvill (1815–1896)

The 7th Baronet was High Sheriff of Yorkshire for 1773 and died unmarried in 1774, causing the baronetcy to become dormant after its American heirs failed to claim the title. He left the estate to his cousin and brother-in-law, the Rev. Christopher Wyvill, from whom it descended in turn via the latter's son Marmaduke, the MP for York, to Marmaduke's son, also Marmaduke (1815–1896). He represented Richmond in Parliament for many years and was also a world class chess player. The current owner is his grandson, Charles Wyvill.

== Popular culture ==
In the 1945 film The Way to the Stars the hall was used as the United States Army Air Forces headquarters. Its exterior remains little changed today.

The hall was also featured in the British television series All Creatures Great and Small, in the episode "Be Prepared", as the home of Major Headingley.

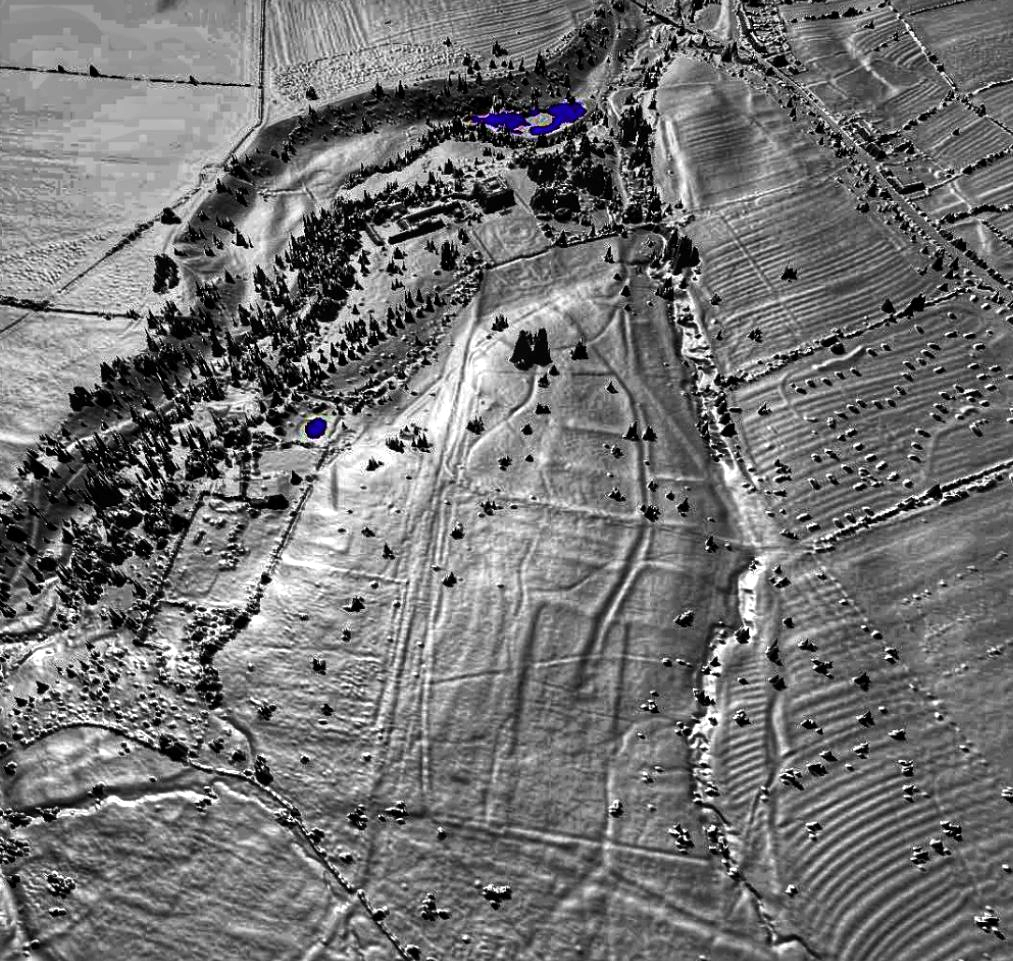
A lidar view of Constable Burton Hall and the site of Burton Constable deserted medieval settlement

== See also ==
- Grade I listed buildings in North Yorkshire (district)
- Listed buildings in Constable Burton
