= Richard Abell =

British lawyer and politician

Richard Abell (c.1688 – aft. March 1744) was a British lawyer and Whig politician who sat in the House of Commons from 1720 to 1727.

Abell was the eldest son of William Abell, of East Claydon, Buckinghamshire and his wife Elizabeth ?Mayne. He was admitted at Emmanuel College, Cambridge in 1705. He was called to the bar as a member of the Inner Temple in 1714.

Abell was returned unopposed as Member of Parliament for Richmond, Yorkshire at a by-election in 1720. He was a Whig and stood in the interest of the Duke of Wharton. At the 1722 general election he was returned as MP for Aylesbury. He did not stand for Parliament again in 1727 or later. In 1728, he sold the manor of East Claydon to the Viscount Fermanagh, retaining a life interest in the property.

Parliament of Great Britain
Preceded by Harry Mordaunt; John Yorke	Member of Parliament for Richmond (Yorkshire); 1720–1722; With: John Yorke	Succeeded by John Yorke; Conyers Darcy
Preceded by Nathaniel Meade; Trevor Hill	Member of Parliament for Aylesbury; 1722–1727; With: John Guise	Succeeded by Sir William Stanhope; Philip Lloyd
