= Sir Marmaduke Wyvill, 1st Baronet =

Sixteenth century English member of Parliament

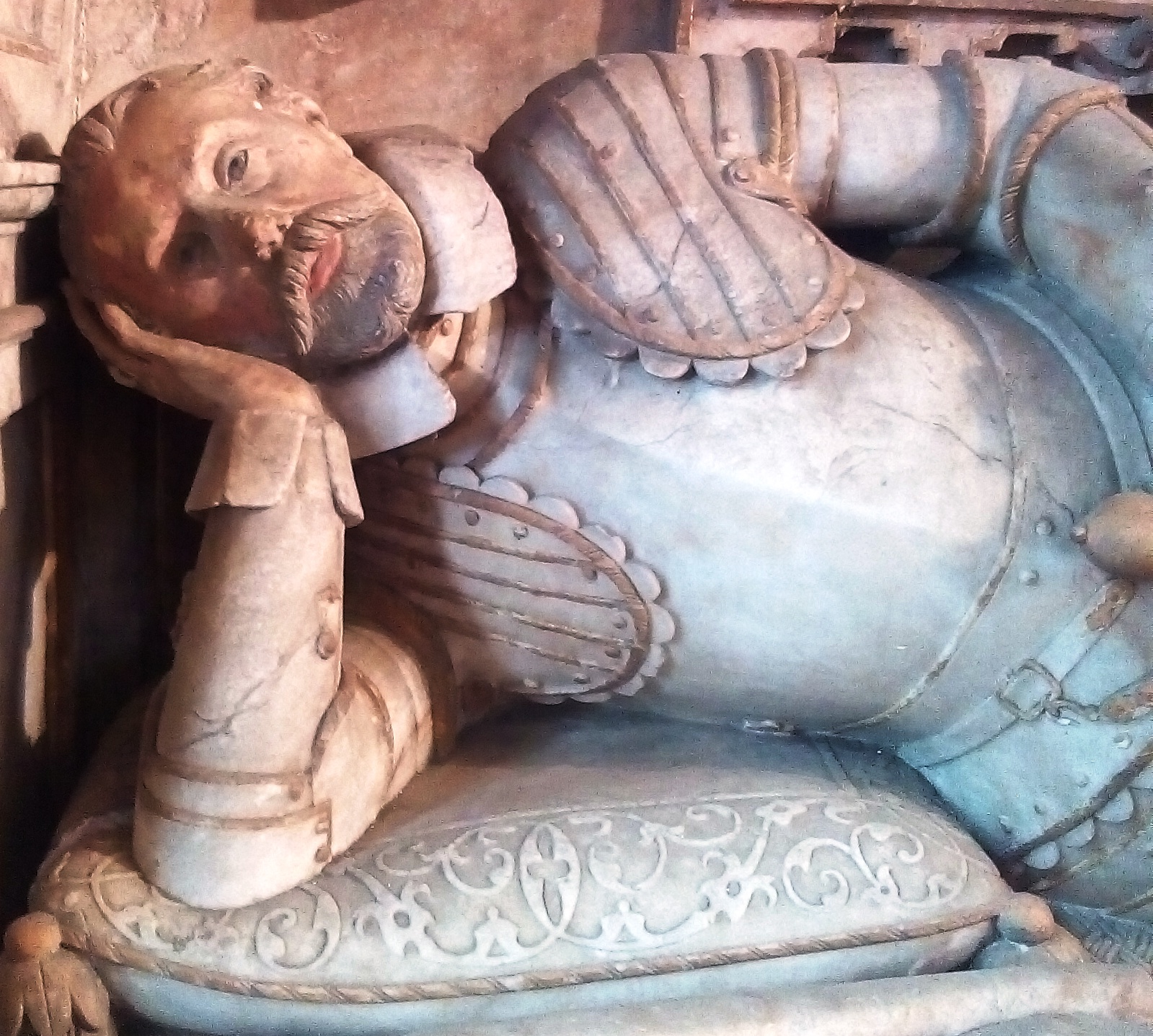
The effigy of Sir Marmaduke Wyvill on his tomb in Masham Church, Yorkshire

Sir Marmaduke Wyvill, 1st Baronet (1542–1617) was an English politician. He was a Member of Parliament for Richmond in 1584 and again in 1598 and the first of the Wyvill baronets. He was the first MP for Richmond and resided at Constable Burton Hall.

== Family ==
Sir Marmaduke was the first son of Christopher Wyvell of Constable Burton by Margaret, the daughter of John Scrope of Hambleden, Buckinghamshire. He was educated at Pembroke College, Cambridge (1566). He was at Lincolns Inn (1560).

Sir Marmaduke married Magdalen Danby, daughter of Sir Christopher Danby of Farnley, Yorkshire. They had six sons and four daughters.

Parliament of England
| New constituency | Member of Parliament for Richmond; 1584; With: John Pepper | Succeeded by Robert Bowes; Samuel Coxe |
| Preceded by Talbot Bowes; John Pepper | Member of Parliament for Richmond; 1597; With: Cuthbert Pepper | Succeeded by Talbot Bowes; Cuthbert Pepper |
Baronetage of England
| New creation | Baronet (of Constable Burton); 1611–1617 | Succeeded by Marmaduke Wyvill |
