= Harry Mordaunt =

English Army officer and Whig politician

Lieutenant-General Harry Mordaunt (29 March 1663 – 4 January 1720) was an English Army officer and Whig politician who sat in the English and British House of Commons between 1692 and 1720.

== Early life ==
Mordaunt was born at Parsons Green, Fulham, a younger son of John Mordaunt, 1st Viscount Mordaunt and his wife Elizabeth Carey. She was the daughter and sole heiress of Thomas Carey, who was the second son of Robert Carey, 1st Earl of Monmouth.

Mordaunt was educated at Middle Temple from 1674 and Westminster School from 1676. He matriculated at Christ Church, Oxford on 17 December 1680, aged 17 and was awarded BA in 1684. Mordaunt married, firstly, Margaret Spencer, natural daughter of Sir Thomas Spencer, 3rd Baronet. He later married Penelope Tipping, the daughter of William Tipping of West Court at Ewelme in Oxfordshire by his wife, Elizabeth Collet. She was the niece of Sir Thomas Tipping, 1st Baronet.

== Army career ==
Mordaunt joined the army and was an ensign by 1689 and captain of the 1st Dragoon Guards by 1693. In April 1694, he was appointed colonel of a regiment of foot, known by his name, which was converted to a marine regiment on 13 July 1698 and disbanded on 20 May 1699. Mordaunt was commander-in-chief at Guernsey in 1697 and 1702. Another regiment of marines was raised under his colonelcy on 10 March 1702, which was converted to infantry in May 1703 and disbanded in July 1713. Mordaunt became brigadier-general in 1704, major-general in 1706 and lieutenant-general in 1709.

== Political career ==
Mordaunt was returned as Member of Parliament for Brackley at a by-election on 2 January 1692 and was returned unopposed at the 1695 English general election. He was defeated in a contest at the 1698 English general election. In 1698, Mordaunt was appointed Conservator of the Forest of Dean until 1712. From 1699 to June 1702, he was Treasurer of Ordnance. He was returned unopposed for Brackley at the two general elections of 1701 but was defeated at the 1702 English general election. He was returned again for Brackley at a by-election on 16 November 1705. Mordaunt was Treasurer of the Ordnance again from 1705 to 1712. At the 1708 British general election he transferred to Richmond, Yorkshire and was returned as MP for the borough. Mordaunt was returned at Richmond unopposed at the 1710 British general election, but at the 1713 British general election he was returned in a contest. He served a third term as Treasurer of the Ordnance from December 1714 until his death. At the 1715 British general election Mordaunt was again returned as Whig MP for Richmond by his cousin, Lord Wharton.

== Death and legacy ==
Mordaunt died on 4 January 1720. By his first wife he had children, including:

- General Sir John Mordaunt, best known for leading the failed Raid on Rochefort in 1757
- Thomas Mordaunt (died 1721)
- Elizabeth Lucy Mordaunt (died 1765), married Sir Wilfrid Lawson, 3rd Baronet on 14 March 1724.

By his second wife he had a single daughter:

- Penelope, married Sir Monoux Cope, 7th Baronet of Bramshill House in Hampshire

Parliament of England
Preceded by Sir William Egerton; John Blencowe	Member of Parliament for Brackley; 1692–1698; With: John Blencowe 1692–1695; Charles Egerton 1695–1698	Succeeded by Charles Egerton; Sir John Aubrey, Bt
Preceded by Sir John Aubrey, Bt; Charles Egerton	Member of Parliament for Brackley; 1701–1702; With: Charles Egerton	Succeeded by John James; Charles Egerton
Preceded by John Sidney; Charles Egerton	Member of Parliament for Brackley; 1705–1707; With: Charles Egerton	Succeeded by Parliament of Great Britain
Parliament of Great Britain
Preceded by Parliament of England	Member of Parliament for Brackley; 1707–1708; With: Charles Egerton	Succeeded by William Egerton; Charles Egerton
Preceded by Thomas Yorke; William Walsh	Member of Parliament for Richmond; 1708–1720; With: Thomas Yorke 1708–1710, 1713–1717; John Yorke 1710–1713, 1717–1720	Succeeded by John Yorke; Richard Abell
Military offices
Preceded by Charles Bertie	Treasurer of the Ordnance; 1699–1702	Succeeded by Charles Bertie
Preceded by Charles Bertie	Treasurer of the Ordnance; 1705–1712	Succeeded by Charles Eversfield
Preceded by Charles Eversfield	Treasurer of the Ordnance; 1714–1720	Succeeded by John Plumptre
