= Conyers Darcy =

British Army officer, courtier and Whig politician

Sir Conyers Darcy or Darcey, KB PC (c. 1685 – 1 December 1758), of Aske, near Richmond, Yorkshire, was a British Army officer, courtier and Whig politician who sat in the House of Commons between 1707 and 1758.

== Early life ==
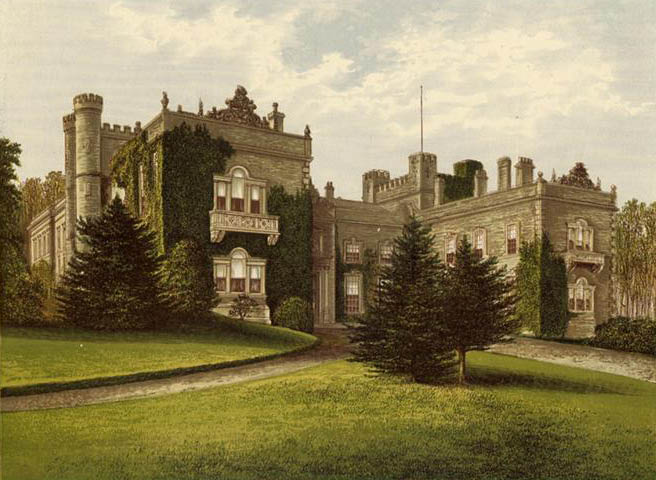
Aske Hall, North Yorkshire c.1880

Darcy was the second surviving son of Hon. John Darcy, MP, and his wife Bridget Sutton, daughter of Robert Sutton, 1st Baron Lexington. He was the younger brother of Robert Darcy, 3rd Earl of Holderness. He was probably educated at Eton College in 1698 and matriculated fellow-commoner from King's College, Cambridge in 1703. He joined the army and was cornet and major in the 1st Life Guards from 1706 to 1715.

== Career ==
Darcy was returned as Member of Parliament for Yorkshire at a by-election on 3 December 1707, but was defeated at the 1708 general election. He refused to stand at the 1710 general election. In 1710 he became gentleman of horse and in 1711, avener and clerk martial. From 1712 to 1714, he was one of the commissioners for the office of Master of the Horse. He was also Colonel of the disembodied Richmondshire Regiment, North Riding Militia.

At the 1715 general election, Darcy was returned as Member of Parliament for Newark. He was appointed commissioner for the office of Master of the Horse again in 1715. He went into opposition with Walpole in 1717, and voted against the Government on several occasions, so he lost all his official posts. When the WHigs subsequently came together again, he was appointed Master of the Household in 1720. At the 1722 general election he was returned at Boroughbridge and at Richmond and chose to sit at Richmond. In 1725, he was invested as a Founder Knight Companion of the Order of the Bath. In 1727, he was appointed Lord Lieutenant of the North Riding of Yorkshire holding the post until 1740. He was initially defeated at the poll at the 1727 general election, but was seated on petition on 14 March 1728. He was promoted to the post of Comptroller of the Household and was sworn a Privy Counsellor in 1730. He was returned for Richmond again at the general elections of 1734 and 1741. At the 1747 he was returned again for Yorkshire and Richmond and this time chose to sit for Yorkshire. He was re-elected for Yorkshire in the 1754 general election. When the Militia was revived in 1758, his nephew Robert Darcy, 4th Earl of Holderness, Lord Lieutenant of the North Riding, re-appointed him to the colonelcy of the Richmondshire Battalion, North York Militia, which he had first held 50 years earlier.

== Family and legacy ==
Darcy married Mary Lady Capell, widow of Algernon Capell, 2nd Earl of Essex and daughter of Hans William Bentinck, 1st Earl of Portland in August 1714. He bought Aske Hall near Richmond, North Yorkshire in 1722 and extensively remodelled it. His wife died on 20 August 1726 and on 12 September 1728 he married Elizabeth, twice widowed daughter of John Rotherham of Much Waltham, Essex. Her former husbands were Sir Theophilus Napier, 5th Baronet, of Luton Hoo, Bedfordshire, and Thomas Howard, 6th Lord Howard of Effingham). He was a founding governor of the Foundling Hospital in London, a charity set up to care for foundlings (abandoned children).

Darcy died without issue on 1 December 1758. Aske Hall was sold in 1763 by Robert Darcy, 4th Earl of Holderness to Sir Lawrence Dundas, 1st Baronet.

Parliament of Great Britain
Preceded by Marquess of Hartington; The Lord Fairfax of Cameron	Member of Parliament for Yorkshire; 1707–1708; With: The Viscount Downe	Succeeded by The Viscount Downe; Sir William Strickland, Bt
Preceded by Richard Newdigate; Richard Sutton	Member of Parliament for Newark; 1715–1722; With: Richard Sutton	Succeeded by Richard Sutton; James Pelham
Preceded by Richard Steele; Sir Wilfrid Lawson, Bt	Member of Parliament for Boroughbridge; 1722–1722; With: James Tyrrell	Succeeded by James Tyrrell; Joseph Danvers
Preceded by John Yorke; Richard Abell	Member of Parliament for Richmond; 1722–1727; With: John Yorke	Succeeded by Charles Bathurst; Sir Marmaduke Wyvill, Bt
Preceded by Charles Bathurst; Sir Marmaduke Wyvill, Bt	Member of Parliament for Richmond; 1728–1747; With: John Yorke	Succeeded by John Yorke; Earl of Ancram
Preceded by Sir Miles Stapylton, Bt; Cholmley Turner	Member of Parliament for Yorkshire; 1747–1758; With: Sir Miles Stapylton, Bt 1747–1750; Henry Playdell Dawnay 1750–1758	Succeeded by Henry Playdell Dawnay; Sir George Savile, Bt
Court offices
Preceded by Thomas Meredyth	Gentleman of the Horse; 1710–1717	Succeeded by Henry Berkeley
Preceded by Thomas Lister	Avener and Clerk Marshal; 1711–1717	Succeeded by Francis Negus
Preceded by Edmund Dunch	Master of the Household; 1720–1730	Succeeded by George Treby
Preceded by Lord Finch	Comptroller of the Household; 1730–1754	Succeeded by The Earl of Hillsborough
Honorary titles
Preceded by The 3rd Earl of Holderness	Lord Lieutenant of the North Riding of Yorkshire; 1722–1740	Succeeded by The 4th Earl of Holderness
Preceded by The Earl of Burlington	Custos Rotulorum of the North Riding of Yorkshire; 1722	Succeeded by The Earl of Burlington
Preceded by The Earl of Burlington	Vice-Admiral of the North Riding of Yorkshire; 1739–1755	Succeeded by The Marquess of Rockingham
Preceded by The 6th Viscount of Irvine	Lord Lieutenant of the East Riding of Yorkshire; 1736–1738	Succeeded by The 7th Viscount of Irvine
