= Sir John Aubrey, 3rd Baronet =

British Whig politician (1680–1743)

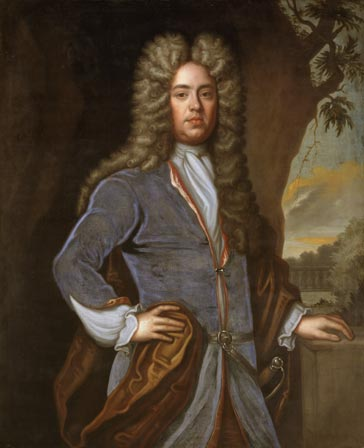
Portrait, oil on canvas, of Sir John Aubrey, 3rd Baronet (1680–1743)

Sir John Aubrey, 3rd Baronet (20 June 1680 – 16 April 1743), of Llantriddyd, Glamorgan, and Boarstall, Buckinghamshire, was a British Whig politician who sat in the English House of Commons from 1706 to 1707, and then in the British House of Commons from 1707 to 1710.

== Background ==
Aubrey was the son of Sir John Aubrey, 2nd Baronet, and his first wife Margaret Lowther, daughter of Sir John Lowther, 1st Baronet. In 1700, Aubrey succeeded his father in the baronetcy. He matriculated at Jesus College, Oxford, on 7 April 1698, aged 17. On 20 June 1701 at St James's Church, Piccadilly, he married Mary Steally, his mother's ‘waiting maid’ whom he had got with child.

== Career ==
Aubrey was elected as Member of Parliament (MP) for Cardiff at a by-election on 1 February 1706, on the recommendation of Thomas Mansel. He was returned again at the 1708 British general election. Despite his cooperation with Mansel, he demonstrated Whig values in Parliament. In 1709, he voted for the naturalization of the Palatines, he twice told with Whigs and against Tories, and he voted in favour of the impeachment of Dr Sacheverell in 1710. He was not put forward at the 1710 British general election. In 1710, he was appointed High Sheriff of Glamorgan.

== Later life and legacy ==
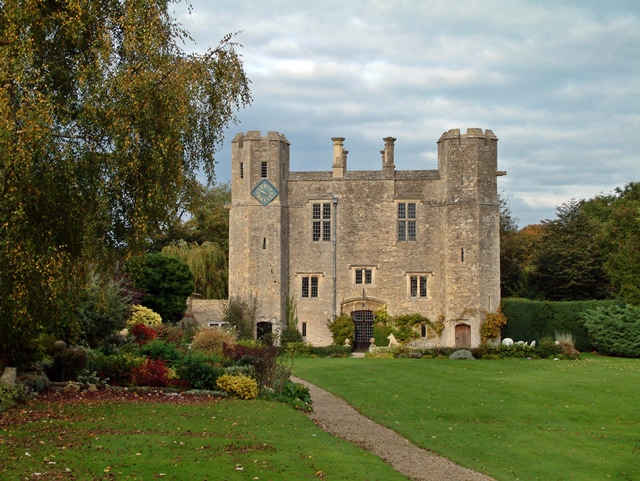
Boarstall Tower

Aubrey's wife died in 1714 and he married in 1716, as his second wife, Frances Jephson, daughter of William Jephson. It was through this marriage that he came into possession of the Manor of Boarstall. Thirdly, he married Jane Thomas at St Benet Paul's Wharf, London on 1 February 1725.

Aubrey died on 16 April 1743, aged 62 and was buried in Boarstall a week later. By his first wife, he had two sons and four daughters. He was succeeded in the baronetcy successively by both his sons John and Thomas.

Parliament of England
Preceded by Thomas Mansel	Member of Parliament for Cardiff; 1706 – 1707	Succeeded by Parliament of Great Britain
Parliament of Great Britain
Preceded by Parliament of England	Member of Parliament for Cardiff; 1707 – 1710	Succeeded by Sir Edward Stradling
Baronetage of England
Preceded by John Aubrey	Baronet (of Llantrithead); 1700 – 1743	Succeeded by John Aubrey
