= Aubrey baronets =

Extinct baronetcy in the Baronetage of England

- Coat of arms of the Aubrey baronets of Llantrithyd
- Creation date: 23 July 1660
- Created by: Charles II
- Baronetage: Baronetage of England
- First holder: Sir John Aubrey, 1st Baronet
- Last holder: Sir Thomas Digby Aubrey, 7th Baronet
- Extinction date: 5 September 1856
- Former seats: Llantrithyd, Glamorgan
- Motto: Solem fero (I will bear the sun)
- Arms: Azure, a chevron between three eagle's heads, erased, or.
- Crest: An eagle's head erased or.

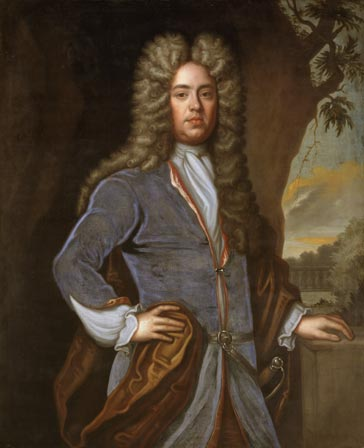
Portrait, oil on canvas, of Sir John Aubrey, 3rd Baronet

The Aubrey Baronetcy, of Llantrithyd in the County of Glamorgan, was a title in the Baronetage of England. It was created on 23 July 1660 for John Aubrey. The second Baronet sat as Member of Parliament for Brackley. The third Baronet represented Cardiff. The sixth Baronet represented six different constituencies in Parliament. The title became extinct on the death of the seventh Baronet in 1856.

== Aubrey baronets, of Llantrithyd (1660) ==
- Sir John Aubrey, 1st Baronet (c. 1606–1679)
- Sir John Aubrey, 2nd Baronet (c. 1650–1700)
- Sir John Aubrey, 3rd Baronet (1680–1743)
- Sir John Aubrey, 4th Baronet (c. 1707–1767)
- Sir Thomas Aubrey, 5th Baronet (died 1786)
- Sir John Aubrey, 6th Baronet (1739–1826)
- Sir Thomas Digby Aubrey, 7th Baronet (1782–1856)

== See also ==
- Aubrey-Fletcher baronets
