= Christopher Danby =

English politician (1503–1571)

Sir Christopher Danby MP JP (1503 – 14 June 1571), of Farnley, Masham, and Thorp Perrow, Yorkshire, of St. Paul's Cray, Kent, and of Kettleby, Lincolnshire, and of Nayland, Suffolk, was an English politician.

== Life ==
He was born to Sir Christopher Danby and Margaret (née Scrope), daughter and coheiress of Thomas Scrope, 5th Baron Scrope of Masham. He succeeded to his father's estates in 1518, and on the death of his mother, inherited the manor of Masham. He was knighted in 1533 at the coronation of Queen Anne Boleyn (second wife of King Henry VIII).

He served as High Sheriff of Yorkshire in 1545, and was a Member of Parliament (M.P.) for Yorkshire in April 1554.

He married Elizabeth Neville, daughter of Richard Neville, 2nd Baron Latimer, and Anne Stafford. They had fourteen children (six sons and eight daughters). His heir on his death was his son, Sir Thomas Danby.

Their six sons were

- Sir Thomas Danby (c.1530-1590) married Mary Neville in line with a 1534 contract.
- Christopher Danby,
- John Danby,
- James Danby,
- Marmaduke Danby, and
- William Danby, who was possibly the William Danby who served as coroner at the inquest into the death of Christopher Marlowe in 1593.

Their eight daughters were

- Dorothy Danby, who married Sir John Neville;
- Mary Danby; who married Sir Edmund Mauleverer
- Joan Danby, who married Roger Meynell, esquire;
- Margaret Danby, who married Christopher Hopton, esquire;
- Anne Danby, who married Sir Walter Calverley, and was the grandmother of Walter Calverley (d. 1605), whose murder of his children is dramatised in A Yorkshire Tragedy, attributed on the title page to William Shakespeare;
- Elizabeth Danby, who married Thomas Wentworth, esquire;
- Magdalen Danby, who married Sir Marmaduke Wyvill, 1st Baronet; and
- Margery Danby, who married Christopher Mallory, esquire.

== Bibliography ==
- Burke, Bernard (1866). A Genealogical History of the Dormant, Abeyant, Forfeited, and Extinct Peerages of the British Empire. London: Harrison.
- Burlinson, Christopher (2004). "Calverley, William (d. 1572)". Oxford Dictionary of National Biography (online ed.). Oxford University Press. doi:10.1093/ref:odnb/39774. (Subscription, Wikipedia Library access or UK public library membership required.) (subscription required)
- Lowe, J. Andreas (2004). "Calverley, Walter (d. 1605)". Oxford Dictionary of National Biography (online ed.). Oxford University Press. doi:10.1093/ref:odnb/4411. (Subscription, Wikipedia Library access or UK public library membership required.) (subscription required)
- Richardson, Douglas (2011). Magna Carta Ancestry: A Study in Colonial and Medieval Families, ed. Kimball G. Everingham. Vol. IV (2nd ed.). Salt Lake City.
