= John Breholt =

- Occupations: Pirate and salvager
- Years active: 1697-1711
- Known for: Organizing several attempts to get the pirates of Madagascar to accept a pardon and bring their wealth home to England
- Piratical career
- Base of operations: Caribbean, the Carolinas, and the Azores
- Commands: Carlisle

John Breholt (Note: Last name occasionally Brehott, Brahoult, Bryholt, or Boryholt.) (fl. 1697–1711) was a pirate and salvager active in the Caribbean, the Carolinas, and the Azores. He is best known for organizing several attempts to get the pirates of Madagascar to accept a pardon and bring their wealth home to England.

== Biography ==
Rumor had long held that pirates on and around Madagascar, such as those concentrated around the pirate trading posts on Ile Ste.-Marie, kept vast sums of money from their plundering. As early as 1697 Breholt approached MP Charles Egerton with a plan to induce the pirates of Madagascar to accept a general pardon and return their wealth to England.

His plans came to nothing so with the backing of the Earl of Carlisle he sailed in 1699 for the Caribbean (in a ship named Carlisle) with a scheme for looting shipwrecks. That August he briefly sailed alongside a flotilla attempting to hunt down associates of William Kidd before heading to Havana to search for the wrecks. When he tried to stop a Spanish vessel in October to hire a local pilot, the Spaniards fled from him; incensed, his crew looted their vessel instead, and giving up on finding the wrecks, sailed to the Carolinas. He arrived in December but a dispute with his crew led them to accuse him of piracy. Breholt was tried but acquitted.

Leaving the Carolinas in early 1700, he hinted that he might sail for Virginia or Cape Verde. Instead he headed to the Azores where he was arrested by the Portuguese. Tried for piracy yet again, he was transported to Lisbon and imprisoned. Crewmen remaining aboard the Carlisle escaped under fire and took the ship to Madagascar, where the ship was lost; while there Breholt's brother George (who had served as the Carlisle’s first mate) was captured by the Royal Navy and accepted a pardon.

Breholt was released from prison in Lisbon in 1701 and made his way back to England. He spent the next three years trying to convince various aristocrats to back another wreck-salvaging venture which may have been a ruse; a former sailor who had served aboard the Carlisle later testified that "Breholt only acted behind the curtain, that his ill charectar might not defeat their reall design, which was to get out to sea and then to carry the said ships to Madagascar." In 1705 he returned to his plans to arrange a pardon for the Madagascar pirates who would bring their riches back with them, petitioning Queen Anne directly and claiming that he had ships ready to depart.

He tried to enlist the New East India Company’s help in 1707 and convinced Daniel Defoe to advocate for his plan; Edgerton once again backed his scheme. He organized over 40 pirate wives who had been left behind in England to petition in support of the plan as well, and produced a woman he claimed was the wife of legendary pirate Henry Every. Former Madagascar castaway John Benbow (son of Admiral Benbow) also spoke in support of the plan, confirming that the Madagascar pirates would accept a pardon.

Breholt was still pushing his Madagascar plan in 1709. Author Penelope Aubin (who had advised Breholt's backers during his failed 1702-1704 salvaging ploy), some of the pirate wives, and a former sailor aboard the Carlisle all testified that Breholt himself was a pirate and schemer; this plus a rival plan pushed by the Marquis of Carmarthen helped doom his efforts. After failing to get the South Sea Company to back his Madagascar plans, he turned to other efforts such as lighthouse-building and was not heard from again. (Note: Several records exist for a ship captain named Davy Breholt in the 1690s, and other records mention a London merchant (and eventual part owner of an East India Company ship) named John Davy Breholt; see this will for an example. Whether this is the same person as the pirate John Breholt who advocated various Madagascar schemes is uncertain.)

== See also ==
- Adam Baldridge, Abraham Samuel, and James Plaintain – leads of the pirate communities on or near Madagascar, whose wealth Breholt and others hoped to bring back to England.
- Francis Nicholson – Governor of Virginia who warned his guard ships to be on the lookout for Breholt.
