= Halton East =

Village and civil parish in North Yorkshire, England

Coordinates: 53.981900°N 1.935690°W

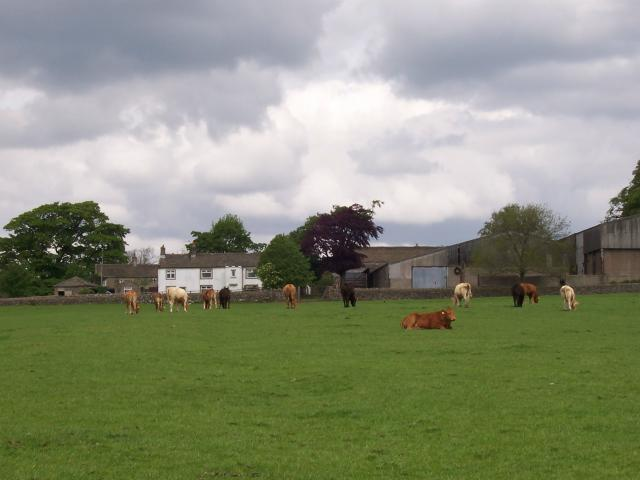
- Halton East from the south

- Location within North Yorkshire
- Population: 90
- OS grid reference: SE043539
- Civil parish: Halton East
- Unitary authority: North Yorkshire
- Ceremonial county: North Yorkshire
- Region: Yorkshire and the Humber
- Country: England
- Sovereign state: United Kingdom
- Post town: SKIPTON
- Postcode district: BD23
- Police: North Yorkshire
- Fire: North Yorkshire
- Ambulance: Yorkshire

Halton East is a village and civil parish in North Yorkshire, England, 3.5 miles (5.6 km) east of Skipton. The population of the parish was estimated at 90 in 2015.

The place was first recorded in the Domesday Book as Haltone. The name is derived from the Old English halh 'nook' and tūn 'farm or village', so means 'farm or village by a nook'. "East" was added to distinguish the village from another Halton, now Halton West, 12 miles (19 km) to the west.

Halton East was historically a township in the large ancient parish of Skipton in the West Riding of Yorkshire. It became a separate civil parish in 1866. In 1974 it was transferred to the new county of North Yorkshire. From 1974 to 2023 it was part of the Craven District, it is now administered by the unitary North Yorkshire Council.

== See also ==
- Listed buildings in Halton East
