= Charles Egerton (MP for Brackley) =

English Whig politician

Egerton's Estate Act 1711
- Act of Parliament
- Parliament of Great Britain
- Long title: An Act for Sale of the Manors of Agardesley, alias Agersley, and Marchington, and several Lands and Hereditaments, in the County of Stafford, for Payment of the Mortgage-monies charged thereon, and other the Debts of the Honourable Charles Egerton Esquire.
- Citation: 10 Ann. c. 10 Pr.
- Territorial extent: Great Britain

Dates
- Royal assent: 22 May 1712
- Commencement: 7 December 1711 (Note: Start of session.)

Status: Current legislation

Arms of Egerton: Argent, a lion rampant gules between three pheons sable

Charles Egerton (12 March 1654 – 11 December 1717), of Marchington, Staffordshire, was an English aristocrat and Whig politician who sat in the English and British Houses of Commons between 1695 and 1711.

The fourth son of John Egerton, 2nd Earl of Bridgwater and his wife Lady Elizabeth Cavendish, daughter of William Cavendish, 1st Duke of Newcastle, he was admitted at the Middle Temple in 1673 and at Lincoln's Inn in 1678.

Egerton married Elizabeth Murray, the daughter and heiress of Henry Murray, Groom of the Bedchamber to Charles I, and widow of Randolph Egerton, of Betley, Staffordshire on 30 April 1691. His brother, Sir William Egerton, was also a lawyer.

Egerton was returned as member of parliament for Brackley, Northamptonshire, on the family interest at the 1695 English general election. He voted for fixing the price of guineas at 22 shillings in March 1695, and voted for the attainder of Sir John Fenwick on 25 November 1696. At the 1698 English general election, he was returned toParliament again unopposed and was a Court supporter. He was returned unopposed at the first 1701 and after a contest at the second 1701 election, and again at the 1702 English general election. At the 1705 English general election he was returned in a contest. He voted for the Court candidate as Speaker on 25 October 1705 and supported the Court in the proceedings on the 'place clause' of the Regency Bill on 18 February 1706. In 1708 he was returned unopposed as a Whig MP for Brackley. He supported the naturalization of the Palatines. At the 1710 British general election he was returned in a contest, but was unseated on petition in favour of John Burgh on 27 January 1711.

From 1697 to 1709 Egerton was involved in backing a scheme to pardon the pirates of Madagascar and have them return to England with their considerable plundered wealth. Propagated by former pirate John Breholt, the scheme lost traction after Breholt's piratical past came to light.

Egerton inherited a share of the estates of Aubrey de Vere, 20th Earl of Oxford, who died in March 1703, but later ran into financial difficulties. In 1712 he obtained a private act of Parliament, Egerton's Estate Act 1711 (10 Ann. c. 10 Pr.), to sell his manor of Marchington in Staffordshire, to pay his debts. He did not stand for Parliament again and died on 11 December 1717, aged 63. He and his wife had one son.

== Notes ==
Parliament of England
Preceded by Harry Mordaunt; Sir John Blencowe	Member of Parliament for Brackley; 1695–1707; With: Harry Mordaunt 1695-1698, 1701, 1705-1707; Sir John Aubrey 1698-1701; John James 1702-1705; John Sidney 1705	Succeeded by Parliament of Great Britain
Parliament of Great Britain
Preceded by Parliament of England	Member of Parliament for Brackley; 1707–1711; With: Harry Mordaunt 1707-1708; William Egerton1708-1711	Succeeded by William Egerton; John Burgh
