= John Darcy, Lord Conyers =

English nobleman, soldier, and member of parliament

John Darcy, Lord Conyers (1659 – 6 January 1689) was an English soldier and one of the two members of the House of Commons of England representing Richmond, Yorkshire, briefly in 1681 and again from 1685 to 1687.

The eldest son of Conyers Darcy, Lord Darcy de Knayth, and Lady Frances Howard, a daughter of Thomas Howard, 1st Earl of Berkshire, Darcy was known by the courtesy title of Lord Conyers during the later life of his grandfather Conyers Darcy, 1st Earl of Holderness, who died on 14 June 1689 aged ninety.

When he was fifteen, Conyers abducted and married Bridget Sutton, the eldest daughter of Robert Sutton, 1st Baron Lexinton. She was aged only ten. They later had five sons, including Robert Darcy, 3rd Earl of Holderness, and Conyers Darcy, and two daughters.

Conyers studied law at Gray's Inn. He was first elected to parliament at the election of 1681, serving in the brief Oxford Parliament of 1681. Due to the Exclusion Bill, King Charles II then ruled without parliament until his death in February 1685. In that year, Conyers was elected again to what became known as the Loyal Parliament, the only one summoned by James II. That sat until 1687, and in its second session Conyers joined the opposition to the king.

Between 1681 and 1685, Conyers held a major's commission in the Queen's Life Guards. In December 1681 he also followed his father as Colonel of the Richmondshire Regiment, North Riding Militia. In July 1685 he became lieutenant-colonel of the Earl of Shrewsbury's Horse, raised in response to the Monmouth Rebellion of 1685.

In 1688, Conyers brought about a reconciliation between Lord Danby and the Earl of Devonshire, laying the foundations of that year's rising against the king in the north of England. Unsuspected as a rebel, he was ordered to arrest his fellow-conspirator Lord Lumley, one of the men who had signed the invitation to William of Orange to invade England and instigate the Glorious Revolution. Conyers claimed he could not find Lumley. On 22 November 1688, with some of his militia, he took part in Danby's seizure of the city of York for William and was expected to join Danby's Tories in the Convention Parliament.

Conyers died of quinsy on 6 January 1689, but four days later at the general election of 1689 he was returned again for Richmond. He was buried in Westminster Abbey. At a subsequent by-election, in February, he was succeeded by his brother Philip Darcy, who had just lost his seat at Newark.
