= Charles Bathurst (MP, died 1743) =

British politician (c. 1703 – 1743)

Charles Bathurst (c. 1703 – 1743) of Clints and Skutterskelfe, Yorkshire was a British politician who sat in the House of Commons briefly from 1727 to 1728

Bathurst was the son of Charles Bathurst of Clints and Skutterskelfe, Yorkshire, and his wife Frances Potter, daughter of Thomas Potter merchant of Leeds. He was educated at Richmond, Yorkshire, and was admitted at Peterhouse, Cambridge on 25 April 1720, aged 16. In 1724 he succeeded his father. He was a prominent freemason.

Bathurst was High Sheriff of Yorkshire for the year 1727 to 1728. At the 1727 British general election, he was returned as Member of Parliament for Richmond with Sir Marmaduke Wyvill. Their friend the mayor, who was returning officer, allowed a large number of unqualified persons to vote for them. On petition the seats were awarded to their opponents on 14 March 1728. He did not stand again.

Bathurst became insane. In 1730 he killed his butler but the coroner's inquest decided he had acted in self-defence. It was also said that at an inn, he threw a waiter downstairs and broke his leg, telling the innkeeper to put it in the bill. He married Anne Hendry, sister of John Hendry of Norbon, county Durham on 16 February 1736.

Bathurst died in 1743 and was buried on 24 September. He was described in his obituary as ‘a man of vivacity, integrity, and generosity’.

Parliament of Great Britain
Preceded by John Yorke; Conyers Darcy	Member of Parliament for Richmond; 1727–1728; With: Sir Marmaduke Wyvill, Bt.	Succeeded by John Yorke; Conyers Darcy
