= William Kerr, 4th Marquess of Lothian =

British Army officer and politician (1710–1775)

General The Most Honourable The Marquess of Lothian KT
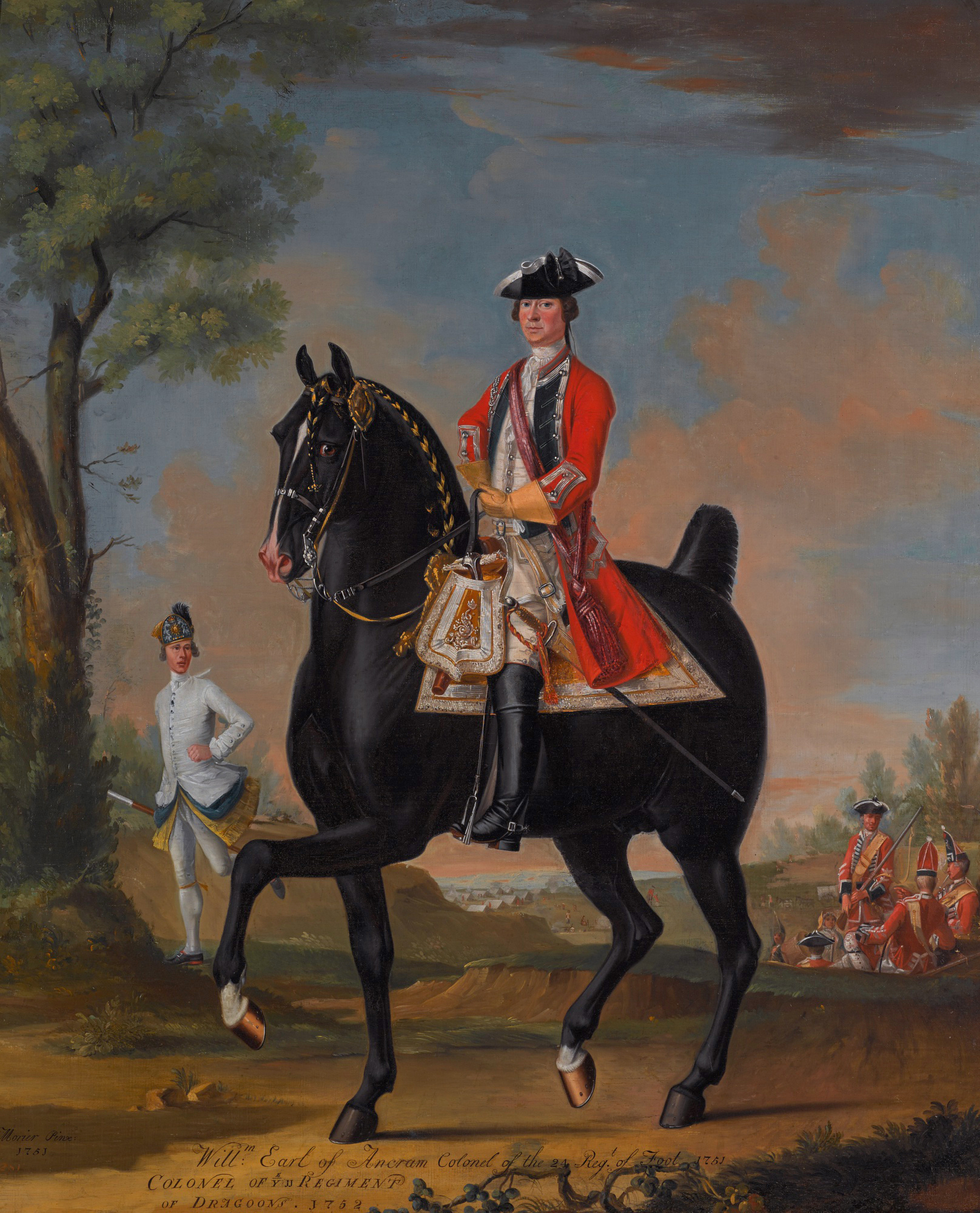
- Portrait by David Morier, 1751
- Born: The Honourable William Henry Kerr; 1710
- Died: 12 April 1775 (aged 64–65) Bath, Somerset, England
- Allegiance: (United Kingdom) Great Britain
- Rank: General

General William Henry Kerr, 4th Marquess of Lothian, KT (1710 – 12 April 1775) was a British Army officer and politician. The eldest son of William Kerr, 3rd Marquess of Lothian, he was styled Master of Jedburgh until 1722, Lord Jedburgh from 1722 to 1735, and Earl of Ancram from 1735 to 1767. As the Earl of Ancram, he distinguished himself during the War of the Austrian Succession.

== Life ==
=== Military service ===
Ancram was commissioned a cornet in 1735. He was a captain in the 31st Regiment of Foot in 1739, and transferred as such to the 1st Regiment of Foot Guards in 1741. He fought with the Guards at the Battle of Fontenoy while serving as an aide-de-camp to the Duke of Cumberland, and was wounded during the battle. He was subsequently made an ADC to the King and a colonel.

In 1745, he was also appointed lieutenant-colonel of Lord Mark Kerr's Regiment of Dragoons, and commanded the cavalry on the left wing at the Battle of Culloden in 1746 (His younger brother, Lord Robert Kerr, was with the infantry and was the highest-ranking Government casualty of the battle). After the battle, he commanded the forces at Aberdeen until August, and then returned to the Continent with Cumberland in December. At some point during the year, he was appointed a Groom of the Bedchamber to Cumberland.

Ancram was sent home with the standards captured at the Battle of Lauffeld. On 1 December 1747, he succeeded Daniel Houghton as colonel of the 24th Regiment of Foot. On 11 December 1747, through the interest of his brother-in-law Robert Darcy, 4th Earl of Holderness, he was returned as Member of Parliament (MP) for Richmond at a by-election in place of Sir Conyers Darcy, who had also been returned for Yorkshire and preferred that seat.

In 1752, Ancram was appointed colonel of the 11th Regiment of Dragoons, in succession to his grand-uncle Lord Mark Kerr. He was promoted to the rank of Lieutenant General in 1758 and held a command under the Duke of Marlborough during the Raid on St Malo.

=== Resignation from the Commons ===
Ancram had followed his old commander Cumberland into politics, and with him supported Pitt and his opposition to the negotiations for the Treaty of Paris. While Ancram's political position was undermined in 1762 when his brother-in-law, Lord Holderness, sold off his interest in the borough of Richmond, Fox and Lord Shelburne were still at pains to persuade him to leave the House of Commons before the vote on the peace preliminaries without the interference of Cumberland. Ancram voted against the preliminaries on 9 December, having missed a message from Cumberland directing him not to do so; ultimately, he took the Chiltern Hundreds in 1763, having accepted, according to the Duke of Newcastle, £4,000 to do so.

=== Later life ===
In 1767, he succeeded to the Marquessate of Lothian. He was elected a Scottish representative peer and appointed a Knight of the Thistle in 1768. He was promoted to general in 1770 and died in 1775 at Bath.

== Family ==
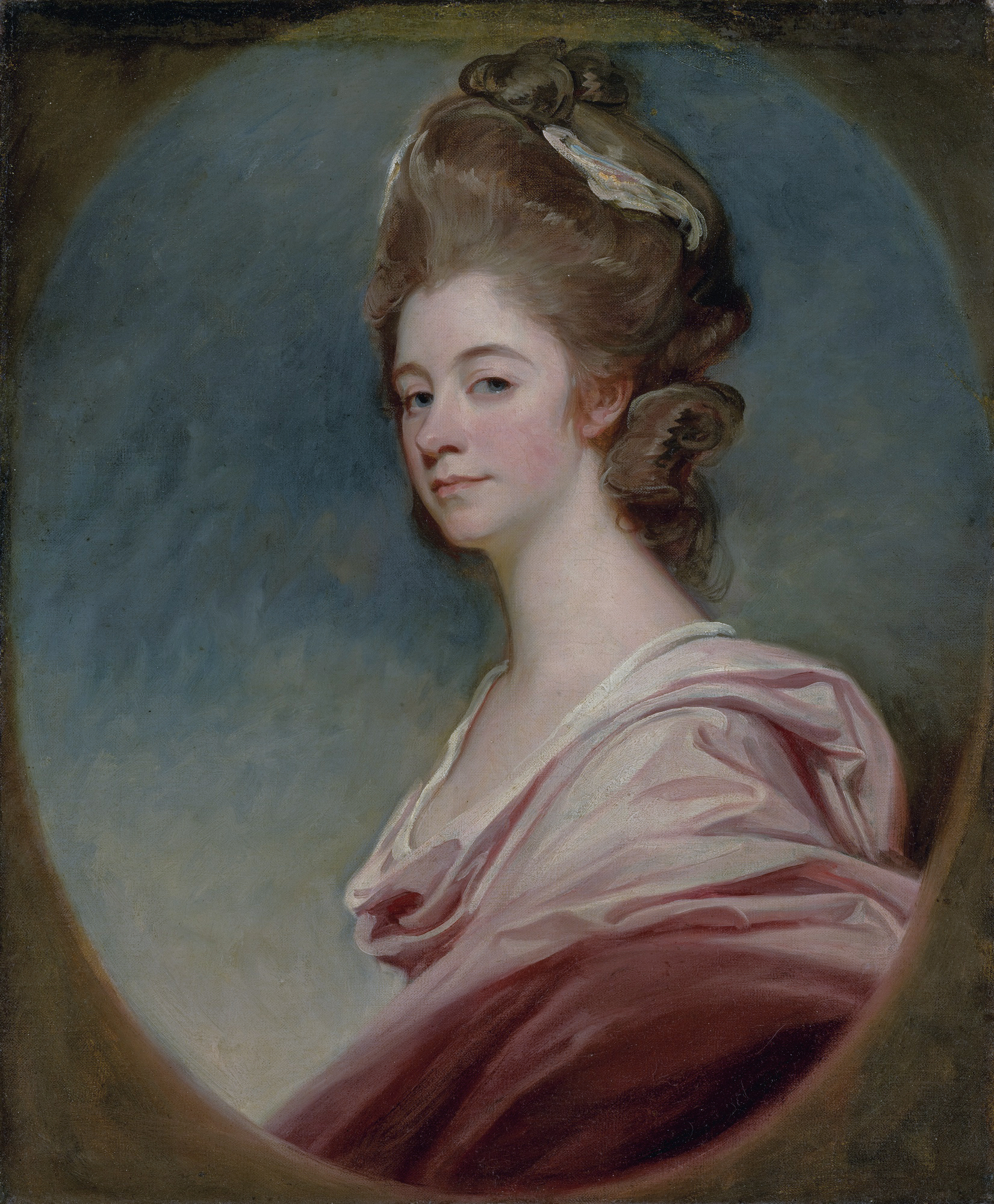
Emilia Kerr (1756–1832), by George Romney

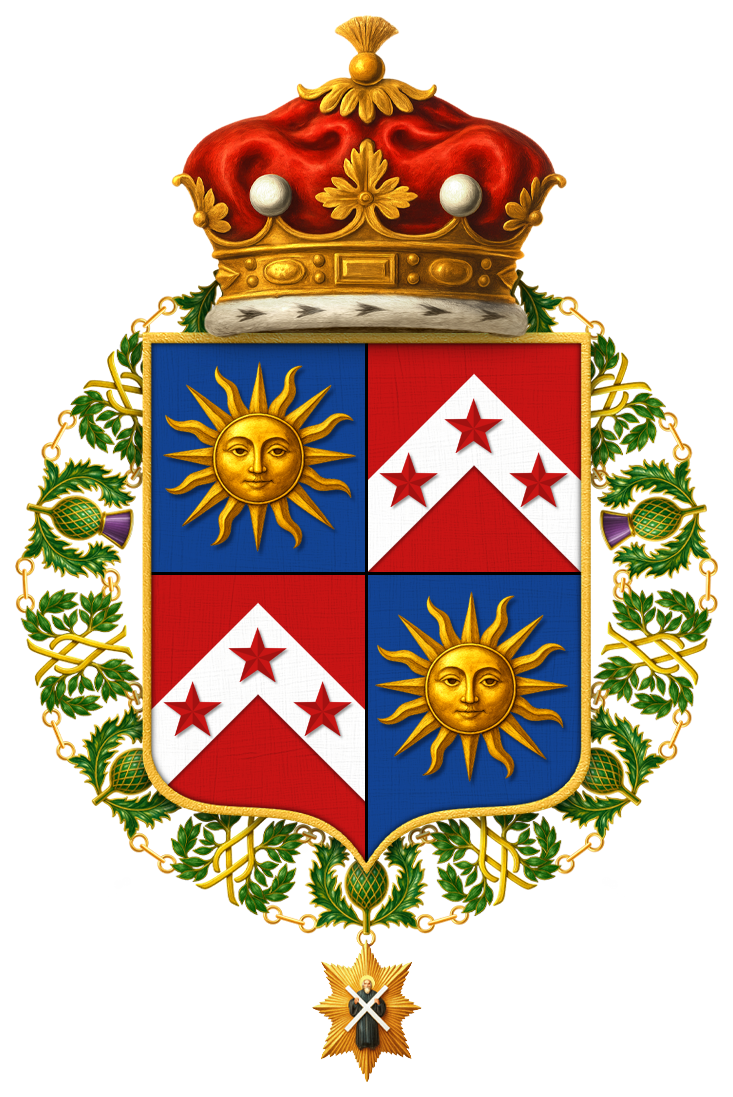
Shield of arms of William Henry Kerr, 4th Marquess of Lothian, KT

On 6 November 1735, he married Lady Carolina Louisa D'Arcy (d. 1778), daughter of Robert D'Arcy, 3rd Earl of Holderness and Lady Frederica Schomberg, and thereafter assumed the style of Earl of Ancram rather than Lord Jedburgh. D'Arcy, Midlothian is named after his wife.

They had three children:

- William John Kerr, 5th Marquess of Lothian (1737–1815)
- Lady Louisa Kerr (born 18 October 1739), married Lord George Henry Lennox on 25 December 1759, at Dumfries, and had issue including
  - Lady Maria Louisa Lennox (2 November 1760 – July 1843).
  - Lady Emilie Charlotte Lennox (December 1763 – 19 October 1832), married Adm. Hon. Sir George Cranfield Berkeley and had issue.
  - Charles Lennox, 4th Duke of Richmond (9 September 1764 – 28 August 1819).
  - Lady Georgiana Lennox (6 December 1765 – 20 January 1841), married Henry Bathurst, 3rd Earl Bathurst.
- Lady Wilhelmina Emilia Kerr, married Col. John McLeod, RA on 2 January 1783 in London and had issue of five daughters and four sons

Parliament of Great Britain
Preceded by Sir Conyers Darcy; John Yorke	Member of Parliament for Member for Richmond; 1747–1763; With: John Yorke 1728–1757; Sir Ralph Milbanke 1761–1768	Succeeded by Sir Ralph Milbanke; Thomas Dundas
Military offices
Preceded by Daniel Houghton	Colonel of the 24th Regiment of Foot; 1747–1752	Succeeded by Hon. Edward Cornwallis
Preceded by Lord Mark Kerr	Colonel of the 11th Regiment of Dragoons; 1752–1775	Succeeded by James Johnston
Peerage of Scotland
Preceded by William Kerr	Marquess of Lothian; 1767–1775	Succeeded by William Kerr
