= Thomas Yorke (1658–1716) =

English landowner and Whig politician

Thomas Yorke (1658–1716) of Gouthwaite Hall and Richmond, Yorkshire was an English landowner and Whig politician, who sat in the House of Commons of England and Great Britain between 1689 and 1716, with two short intervals.

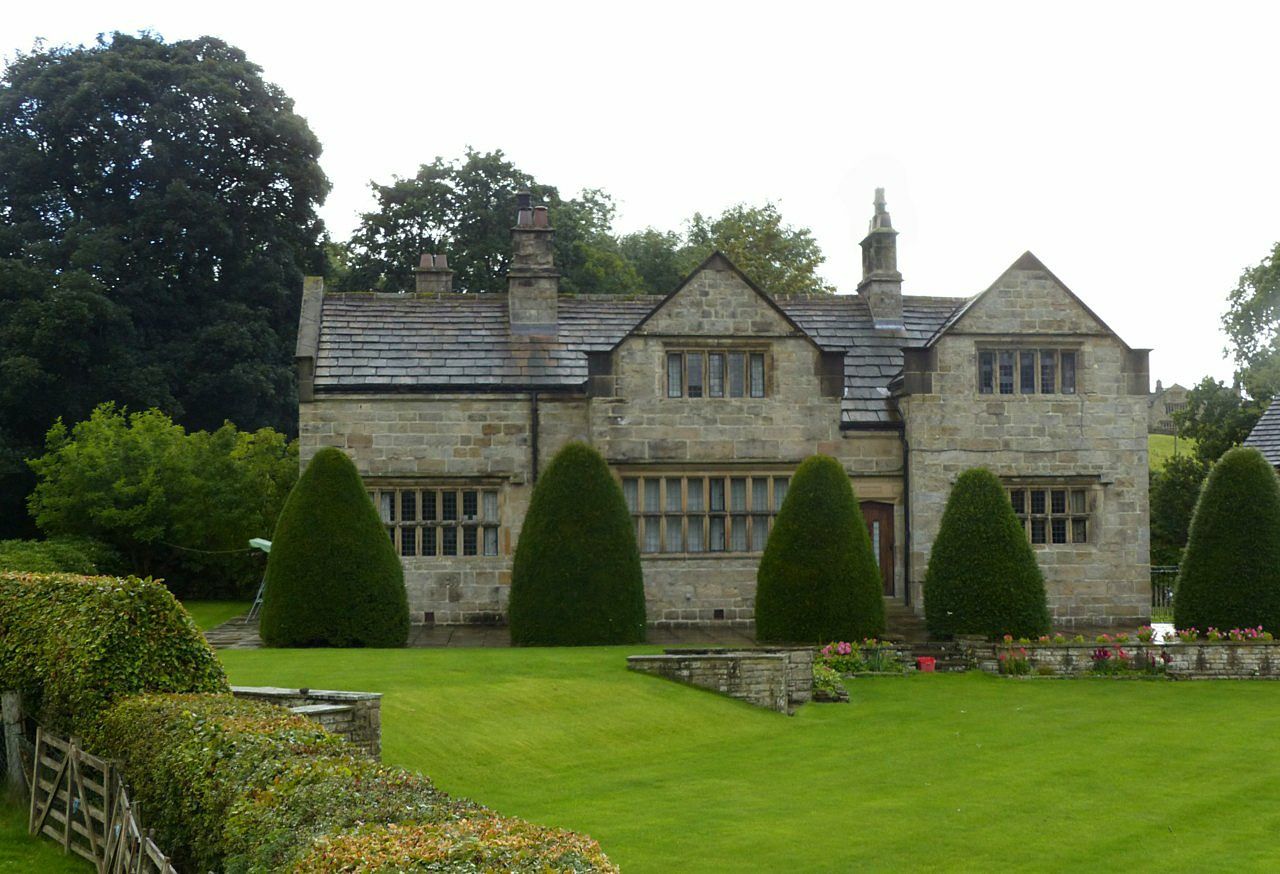
Gouthwaite Hall, Nidderdale, North Yorkshire

Yorke was born in 1658, the son of John Yorke of Gouthwaite Hall and his wife Mary Norton daughter of Maulger Norton of St Nicholas, near Richmond. His father was MP for Richmond in the North Riding of Yorkshire from 1661 to 1663. At the age of four he inherited his father's estates Stonebeck Down (including Gouthwaite Hall) and Stonebeck Up in Nidderdale and in Richmond. In 1674 his mother Mary added to his inheritance by the purchase of the manor of Bewerley in Nidderdale. In 1680 he married Katherine Lister, the heiress of estates in Lancashire.

Yorke was elected Member of Parliament for the Richmond constituency in the Convention Parliament of 1689 as a Whig. He was a Commissioner for assessment, for the North and West Ridings of Yorkshire from 1689 to 1690 and was made a Justice of the Peace for the North Riding by 1690, retaining the role for the rest of his life. He lost his seat at the 1690 English general election, but was re-elected at the 1695 English general election. He signed the Association, and voted for the attainder of Sir John Fenwick on 25 November 1696. He was returned unopposed at the 1698 English general election and showed his support for the Whig Junto. At the two general elections of 1701, he was again returned unopposed, and was generally inactive in Parliament. He was returned unopposed at the 1702 English general election and did not vote for the Tack. He faced a contest at the 1705 English general election and was returned successfully. He voted for the Court candidate as Speaker on 25 October 1705. At the 1708 British general election, he was returned unopposed as Whig MP and voted for the naturalisation of the Palatines. As a Whig he probably voted for the impeachment of Dr Sachaverell, but the record on this is conflicting. He let his son John take his seat at the 1710 British general election. He was returned again for Richmond in a bitter contest at the 1713 British general election and voted against the expulsion of Richard Steele on 18 March 1714. He retained his seat at the 1715 British general election.

Yorke died in 1716 and was buried in Richmond parish church on 16 November. He left three sons and four daughters.

Parliament of England
Preceded by Thomas Cradock; John Darcy, Lord Conyers	Member of Parliament for Richmond; 1689–1690; With: John Darcy, Lord Conyers; Philip Darcy	Succeeded by Sir Mark Milbanke, Bt; Theodore Bathurst
Preceded by Sir Mark Milbanke, Bt; Theodore Bathurst	Member of Parliament for Richmond; 1695–1707	Succeeded by Parliament of Great Britain
Parliament of Great Britain
Preceded by Parliament of England	Member of Parliament for Richmond; 1707–1710; With: William Walsh; Harry Mordaunt	Succeeded by John Yorke; Harry Mordaunt
Preceded by John Yorke; Harry Mordaunt	Member of Parliament for Richmond; 1713–1716; With: Harry Mordaunt	Succeeded by John Yorke; Harry Mordaunt
