= Constable Burton =

Village and civil parish in North Yorkshire, England

Coordinates: 54.313°N 1.745°W

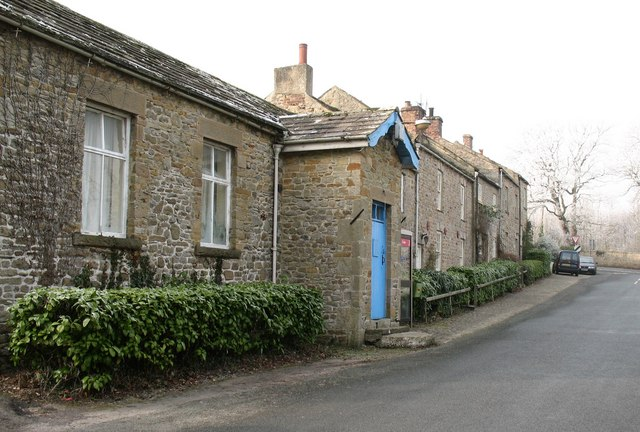
- Constable Burton

- Location within North Yorkshire
- Population: 182 (2011 census)
- OS grid reference: SE166908
- Unitary authority: North Yorkshire
- Ceremonial county: North Yorkshire
- Region: Yorkshire and the Humber
- Country: England
- Sovereign state: United Kingdom
- Post town: LEYBURN
- Postcode district: DL8
- Police: North Yorkshire
- Fire: North Yorkshire
- Ambulance: Yorkshire
- UK Parliament: Richmond and Northallerton

Constable Burton is a village and civil parish in North Yorkshire, England. It is 3 miles (4.8 km) east of Leyburn.

== History ==
The village takes its name from ‘Burton’, meaning a fortified settlement in Old English, and ‘Constable’ as in 1100 it was granted to Roald, the Chief Constable for the Earl of Richmond.

Constable Burton was mentioned in Domesday Book in 1086 as being in the hundred of "Land of Count Alan" and the county of Yorkshire and the population was estimated at 20 households.

In 1870–72 John Wilson's Imperial Gazetteer of England and Wales described Constable Burton as:

"a township in Finghall parish, N. R. Yorkshire; adjacent to the Leyburn railway, 3¼ miles E of Leyburn. It includes the hamlet of Studdow. Acres, 2,572. Real property, £3,038. Pop., 224. Houses, 46."

The grade-I-listed Georgian mansion of Constable Burton Hall was built in 1768 by John Carr for Sir Marmaduke Wyvill and is now owned by Marmaduke's great grandson, Charles. The surrounding gardens have been open to the public on selected dates throughout the year since 1977.

From 1856 to 1954 Constable Burton railway station on the Wensleydale Railway served the village, hall and the rural community. There is passing loop at the site.

== Governance ==
The village is in the Richmond and Northallerton parliamentary constituency, which is under the control of the Conservative Party. The Member of Parliament since the 2015 general election has been Rishi Sunak, former Prime Minister.

From 1974 to 2023 it was part of the district of Richmondshire. It is now administered by the unitary North Yorkshire Council.

== Community and culture ==
The village public house, The Wyvill Arms, is a former 18th-century farmhouse and has been featured in the Good Pub Guide. There used to be a school in the village, now converted into housing.

== See also ==
- Listed buildings in Constable Burton
- Unthank, North Yorkshire
