= Sir Marmaduke Wyvill, 5th Baronet =

English politician and official

Sir Marmaduke Wyvill, 5th Baronet (c.1666–1722) was an English politician and official.

He was the eldest son of Sir William Wyvill, 4th Baronet and his wife Anne Brookes, and entered Trinity College, Cambridge in 1682, as a fellow commoner. A High Tory with connections to the Stuarts through his courtier wife, he was elected to parliament for Richmond (Yorks) in 1695. He then under Queen Anne held official positions in the excise and other tax areas.

In 1711 Wyvill became a Fellow of the Royal Society, supported by Owen Brigstocke.

== Family ==
Wyville married Henrietta Maria, daughter of Sir Thomas Yarburgh of Snaith, MP. She had been maid of honour to Catherine of Braganza and Mary of Modena. They had three sons and four daughters. Sir Marmaduke Wyvill, 6th Baronet was their son.

== Notes ==
Baronetage of England
Preceded by William Wyvill	Baronet (of Constable Burton) c.1684–1722	Succeeded by Marmaduke Wyvill
