= Llantrithyd =

Village in the Vale of Glamorgan, Wales

Coordinates: 51.447°N 3.376°W

Llantrithyd (Welsh: Llantriddyd) is a rural village and community in the Vale of Glamorgan, Wales. The Aubrey Baronets were lords of the manor of Llantrithyd for centuries: the family died out in the 1850s.

== St Illtyd's Church ==
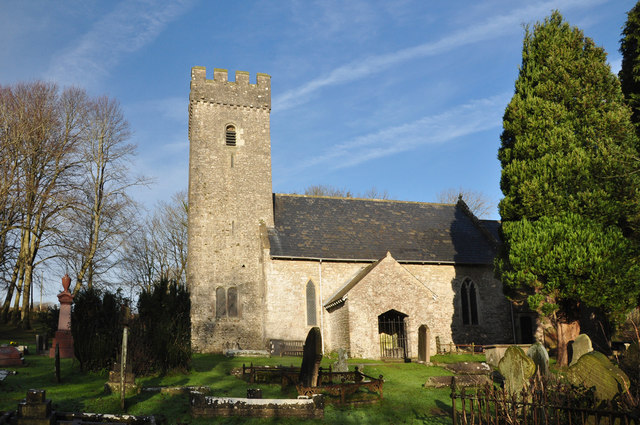
St Illtyd's Church

The church of St Illtyd has twelfth-century origins and was rebuilt in the fourteenth century. Restorations and renovations were carried out in 1839, 1897 and 2016. Inside the church is an elaborate tomb of John Bassett (John ap Thomas Bassett, died 1554) and his second wife Elizabeth (died 1596). John Bassett was a lawyer and the Surveyor of Lands to Queen Catherine Parr, and is thought to have built Llantrithyd Place.

== Llantrithyd Place ==
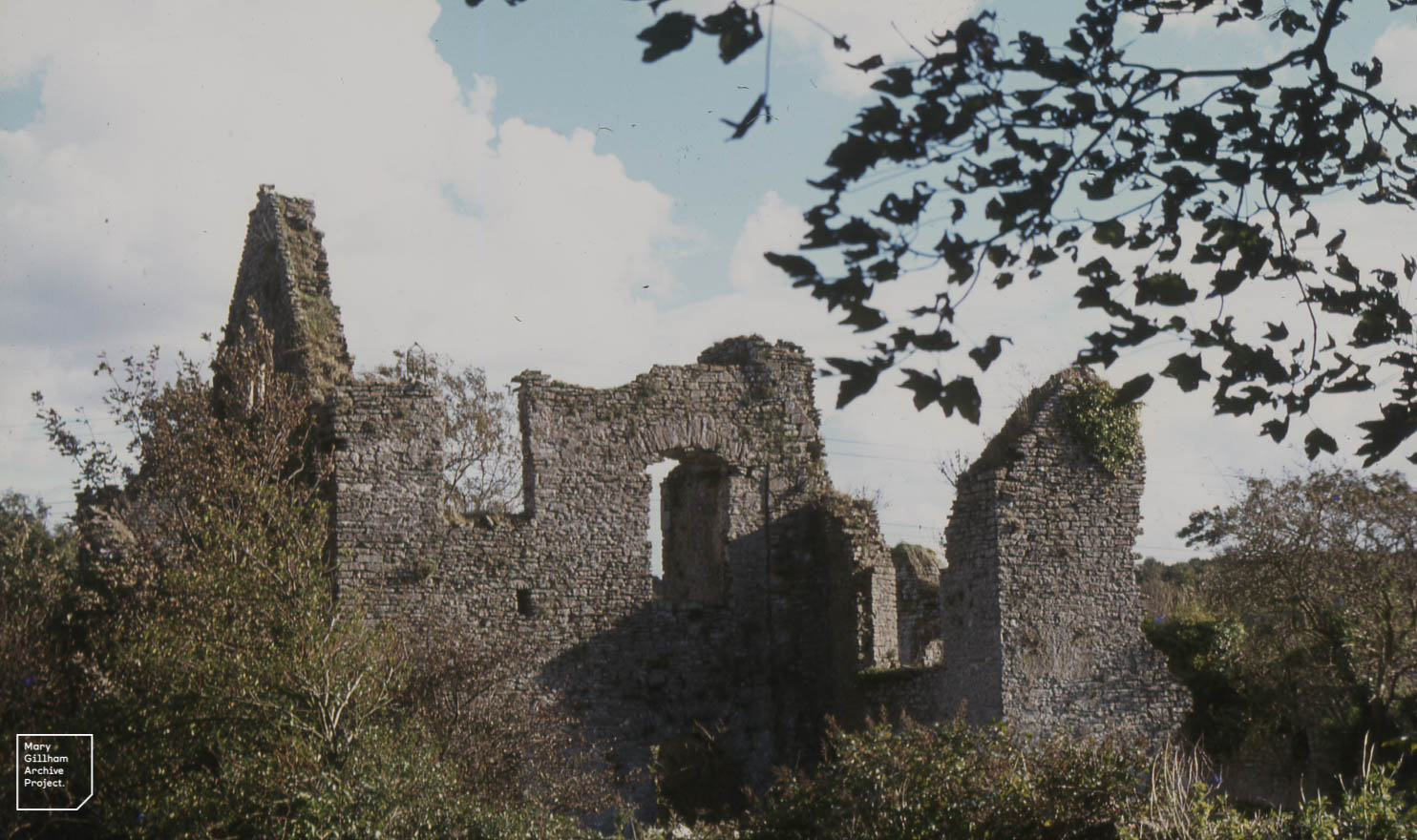
Llantrithyd Place

Llantrithyd Place is a sixteenth-century manor house, now in ruins. There is a tradition that the house was built in 1546, probably on the ruins of an earlier house. The deer park and the gardens surrounding the house are designated Grade II* on the Cadw/ICOMOS Register of Parks and Gardens of Special Historic Interest in Wales.
