= Wharton Dunch =

English politician (died 1705)

Wharton Dunch (by 1679 – c. 22 September 1705) was an English Whig politician. He sat as MP for Appleby from February 1701 till 1702 and MP for Richmond from 14 May till his death c. 22 September 1705.

He was the first son of Major Dunch (died 1679) and Margaret, daughter of Philip Wharton, 4th Baron Wharton. He was matriculated at Pembroke College, Oxford on 27 March 1697 at the age of 15.

He was defeated at Appleby in 1702. He stood unsuccessfully for Southampton, where he stood on his own interest. He was returned for Richmond but died before parliament met. The news of his death was reported on 22 September 1705.
