= Wyvill baronets =

Title in the Baronetage of England

The Wyvill Baronetcy, of Constable Burton in the County of York, was a title in the Baronetage of England. It was created on 25 November 1611 for Marmaduke Wyvill, the former Member of Parliament for Richmond. The fifth and sixth Baronets also represented Richmond in the House of Commons. The title became dormant on the death of the seventh Baronet in 1774.

== Wyvill baronets, of Constable Burton (1611) ==
- Sir Marmaduke Wyvill, 1st Baronet (c. 1542–1617)
- Sir Marmaduke Wyvill, 2nd Baronet (died c. 1648)
- Sir Christopher Wyvill, 3rd Baronet (1614–1681)
- Sir William Wyvill, 4th Baronet (1645–c. 1684)
- Sir Marmaduke Wyvill, 5th Baronet (c. 1666–1722)
- Sir Marmaduke Wyvill, 6th Baronet (c. 1692–1754)
- Sir Marmaduke Asty Wyvill, 7th Baronet (1740–1774)

Possible claimants in the United States. The probable succession is:

- Marmaduke Wyvill, possible 8th Baronet (died 1784)
- Darcy Wyvill, possible 9th Baronet (1766 - c. 1790)
- Robert Wyvill, possible 10th Baronet (died c. 1800)
- Marmaduke Wyvill, possible 11th Baronet (1771–1808)
- Walter Wyvill, possible 12th Baronet (1780 – c. 1840)
- Edward Hale Wyvill, possible 13th Baronet (1812 – c. 1894)
- Walter Davis Wyvill, possible 14th Baronet (1834–1898)
- William Edward Wyvill, possible 15th Baronet (1859–1911)
- Carlisle Osborne Wyvill, possible 16th Baronet (1894–1941)
- Newton D'Arcy Wyvill, possible 17th Baronet (1895–1971) (appeared on an episode of To Tell the Truth in the early 1960's)

Succession after Newton's death is unclear, but the senior heir appears to be:

- Marmaduke Charles Asty Wyvill, possible 18th Baronet (born 1945)

Baronetage of England
| Preceded by Peshall baronets | Wyvill baronets 25 November 1611 | Succeeded by Holte baronets |
