= List of works by Andrew Marvell =

Works by Andrew Marvell

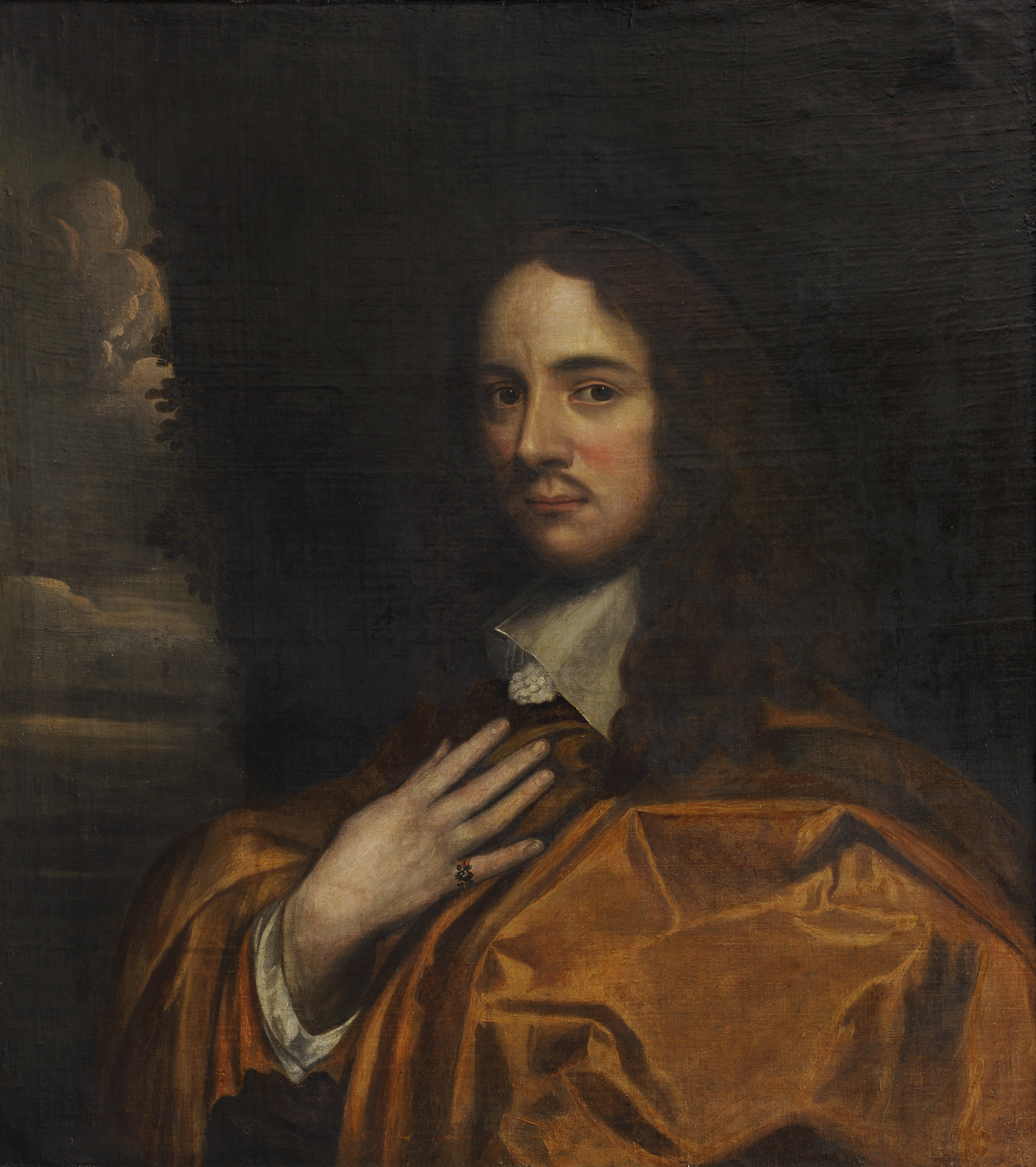
Andrew Marvell wrote many poems.

The works of the metaphysical poet and politician Andrew Marvell consists of lyric poems, Latin poems, and political and satirical pamphlets, many printed anonymously or circulated privately.

== Poetry ==
Poems of disputed authorship are marked with asterisks. Organization is based on the 1993 Everyman's Library edition.

=== Collected works ===
- Miscellaneous Poems (1681).

=== Lyric poems ===
- A Dialogue Between the Resolvèd Soul and Created Pleasure
- On a Drop of Dew
- The Coronet
- Eyes and Tears
- Bermudas
- Clorinda and Damon
- Two Songs at the Marriage of the Lord Fauconberg and the Lady Mary Cromwell
- A Dialogue Between the Soul and Body
- The Nymph Complaining for the Death of Her Fawn
- Young Love
- To His Coy Mistress
- The Unfortunate Lover
- The Gallery
- The Fair Singer
- Mourning
- Daphnis and Chloe
- The Definition of Love
- The Picture of Little T.C. in a Prospect of Flowers
- The Match
- The Mower Against Gardens
- Damon the Mower
- The Mower to the Glo-Worms
- The Mower's Song
- Ametas and Thestylis Making Hay-Ropes
- Musicks Empire
- The Garden
- The Second Chorus from Seneca's Tragedy, Thyestes

=== The Cromwell era ===
- An Horatian Ode upon Cromwell's Return from Ireland
- Upon the Hill and Grove at Bill-borow
- Upon Appleton House
- The Character of Holland
- The First Anniversary of the Government Under His Highness The Lord Protector
- A Poem upon the Death of His late Highnesse the Lord Protector

=== The Charles II era ===
- The Last Instructions to a Painter
- Epigramme Upon Blood's attempt to steale the Crown

=== Poets and heroes ===
- Fleckno, an English Priest at Rome
- To his Noble Friend, Mr. Richard Lovelace, upon his Poems
- To his worthy Friend Doctor Witty upon his Translation of the Popular Errors
- On Mr. Milton's Paradise Lost

=== Poems in Latin ===
- Ros
- Magdala, lascivos sic quum dimisit Amantes
- Hortus
  - Translation. The Garden
- Epigramma in Duos montes Amosclivum Et Bilboreum
- Dignissimo suo Amico Doctori Wittie. De Translatione Vulgi Errorum D. Primrosii.
- In Legationem Domini Oliveri St. John ad Provincias Foederatas
- A Letter to Doctor Ingelo
  - Translation.
- In Effigiem Oliveri Cromwell
  - Translation. On the Portrait of Oliver Cromwell.
- In eandem Reginae Sueciae Transmissam
  - Translation. On the same being sent to the Queen of Sweden.
- Upon an Eunuch; a Poet
- In the French translation of Lucan, by Monsieur De Brebeuf are these Verses
- Inscribenda Luparae
- To A Gentleman that only upon the sight of the Author's writing....

=== Disputed authorship ===
- A Dialogue between Thyrsis and Dorinda
- Tom May's Death
- On the Victory obtained by Blake over the Spaniards
