= Descriptive poetry =

Descriptive poetry is the name given to a class of literature that belongs mainly to the 16th, 17th and 18th centuries in Europe. From the earliest times, all poetry not subjectively lyrical was apt to indulge in ornament which might be named descriptive. But the critics of the 17th century formed a distinction between the representations of the ancients and those of the moderns. Boileau stated that, while Virgil paints, Tasso describes. This may be a useful indication in defining not what should, but what in practice has been called descriptive poetry.

"[Descriptive poetry] is poetry in which it is not imaginative passion that prevails, but a didactic purpose or even something of the instinct of a sublimated auctioneer. In other words, the landscape, architecture, still life or whatever may be the object of the poet's attention, is not used as an accessory, but is itself the centre of interest. In this sense, it is not correct to call poetry in which description is only the occasional ornament of a poem and not its central subject, descriptive poetry. The landscape or still life must fill the canvas or, if human interest is introduced, that must be treated as an accessory. Thus, in the Hero and Leander of Marlowe and in the Alastor of Shelley, description of a very brilliant kind is largely introduced. Yet, these are not examples of what is technically called descriptive poetry because it is not the strait between Sestos and Abydos and it is not the flora of a tropical glen, which concentrates the attention of the one poet or of the other, but it is an example of physical passion in the one case and of intellectual passion in the other, which is diagnosed and dilated on. On the other hand, James Thomson's The Seasons, in which landscape takes the central place, and Drayton's Polyolbion, where everything is sacrificed to a topographical progress through Britain, are strictly descriptive."—Edmund Gosse in Encyclopædia Britannica Eleventh Edition.

== Boileau ==
It will be obvious this definition that the danger ahead of all purely descriptive poetry is that it will lack intensity, that it will be frigid if not dead. Description for description's sake, especially in studied verse, is rarely a vitalized form of literature. It is threatened, from its very conception, with languor and coldness. Therefore, it must exercise an extreme art or be condemned to immediate sterility. Boileau, with his customary intelligence, was the first to see this, and he thought that the danger might be avoided by care in technical execution. His advice to the poets of his time was:

Soyez riches et pompeux dans vos descriptions;
C'est là qu'il faut des vers étaler l'élégance,

and:

De figure sans nombre égayez votre ouvrage;
Que toute y fasse aux yeux une riante image,

== Works ==
In England the famous translation (1592–1611) by Joshua Sylvester of the Divine Weeks and Works of Du Bartas, containing such lines as those that the juvenile Dryden admired so much:

But when winter's keener breath began
To crystalize the Baltic ocean,
To glaze the lakes and bridle up the floods,
And perriwig with wool the bald-pate woods.

There was also the curious physiological epic of Phineas Fletcher, The Purple Island (1633). But on the whole, it was not until French influences had made themselves felt on English poetry that description, as Boileau conceived it, was cultivated as a distinct art. The Coopers Hill (1642) by Sir John Denham may be contrasted with the less ambitious To Penshurst of Ben Jonson and this one represents the new no less completely than the other does the old generation. If, however, Coopers Hill is examined carefully, it is perceived that its aim is after all rather philosophical than topographical. The Thames is described indeed, but not very minutely and the poet is mainly absorbed in moral reflections.

Marvell's long poem on the beauties of Nunappleton, Upon Appleton House, comes nearer to the type. But it is hardly until the 18th century that in English literature appears what is properly known as descriptive poetry. This was the age in which poets, often of no mean capacity, began to take such definite themes as a small country estate (Pomfrets Choice, 1700), the cultivation of the grape (Gays Wine, 1708), a landscape (Popes Windsor Forest, 1713), a military manoeuvre (Addisons Campaign, 1704), the industry of an apple orchard (Philips Cyder, 1708) or a piece of topography (Tickells Kensington Gardens, 1722) as the sole subject of a lengthy poem, generally written in heroic or blank verse. These tours de force were supported by minute efforts in miniature-painting, by touch applied to touch and were often monuments of industry, but they were apt to lack personal interest and suffered from a general and deplorable frigidity. They were infected with the faults that accompany an artificial style. They were monotonous, rhetorical, and symmetrical, while the uniformity of treatment inevitable to their plan rendered them hopelessly tedious if prolonged to any great extent.

== James Thomson ==
This species of writing had been cultivated to a considerable degree through the preceding century, in Italy and (as the remarks of Boileau testify) in France, but it was in England that it reached its highest importance. The classic of descriptive poetry, in fact, the specimen that the literature of the world presents that must be considered as the most important and the most successful, is The Seasons (1726–1730) of James Thomson.

For the first time, a poet of considerable eminence appeared, to whom external nature was all sufficient and who succeeded in conducting a long poem to its close by a single appeal to landscape and to the emotions it directly evokes. Coleridge, somewhat severely, described The Seasons as the work of a good rather than of a great poet and it is an indisputable fact that, at its very best, descriptive poetry fails to awaken the highest powers of the imagination. A great part of Thomson's poem is nothing more nor less than a skillfully varied catalogue of natural phenomena. The famous description of twilight in the fading many-colored woods of autumn may be taken as an example of the highest art to which purely descriptive poetry has ever attained. It is obvious even here that the effect of these rich and sonorous lines, in spite of the splendid effort of the artist, is monotonous and leads up to no final crisis of passion or rapture. Yet Thomson succeeds, as few other poets of his class have succeeded, in producing nobly-massed effects and comprehensive beauties such as were utterly unknown to his predecessors.

== After Thomson ==
He was widely imitated in England, especially by Armstrong, Akenside, Shenstone (in The Schoolmistress, 1742), by the anonymous author of Albania, 1737 and by Oliver Goldsmith (in The Deserted Village, 1770). No better example of the more pedestrian class of descriptive poetry could be found than the last-mentioned poem with its minute and Dutch-like painting.

How often have I paused on every charm:
The sheltered cot, the cultivated farm;
The never-failing brook, the busy mill,
The decent church that topped the neighboring hill:
The hawthorn-bush, with seats beneath the shade
For talking age and whispering lovers made.

On the continent of Europe the example of Thomson was almost immediately fruitful. Four several translations of The Seasons into French contended for the suffrages of the public. Jean François de Saint-Lambert (1716–1803) imitated Thomson in Les Saisons (1769), a poem that enjoyed popularity for half a century, and of which Voltaire said that it was the only one of its generation that would reach posterity. Nevertheless, as Madame du Deffand told Walpole, Saint-Lambert is froid, fade et faux and the same may be said of Jean-Antoine Roucher (1745–1794) who wrote Les Mois in 1779, a descriptive poem famous in its day.

The Abbé Jacques Delille (1738–1813), perhaps the most ambitious descriptive poet who has ever lived, was treated as a Virgil by his contemporaries. He published Les Géorgiques in 1769, Les Jardins in 1782 and L' Homme des champs in 1803, but he went furthest in his brilliant, though artificial Trois règnes de la nature (1809), which French critics have called the masterpiece of this whole school of descriptive poetry. Delille, however, like Thomson before him, was unable to avoid monotony and want of coherency. Picture follows picture and no progress is made. The satire of Marie Joseph Chénier in his famous and witty Discours sur les poèmes descriptifs, brought the vogue of this species of poetry to an end.

In England, again, Wordsworth, who treated the genius of Thomson with unmerited severity, revived descriptive poetry in a form that owed more than Wordsworth realized to the model of The Seasons. In The Excursion and The Prelude, as well as in many of his minor pieces, Wordsworth's philosophical and moral intentions cannot prevent the reader from perceiving the large part that pure description takes. The same may be said of much of the early blank verse of Coleridge.

== Subsequent developments ==
Since their day, however, purely descriptive poetry has gone more and more completely out of fashion and its place has been taken by the richer and more direct effects of such prose as that of John Ruskin in English or of Fromentin and Pierre Loti in French. It is almost impossible in descriptive verse to obtain those vivid and impassioned appeals to the imagination that form the essence of genuine poetry, and it is unlikely that descriptive poetry, as such, will retake a prominent place in living literature.
