= St John's Church, Acaster Selby =

Church in Acaster Selby, North Yorkshire, England

Coordinates: 53.8614°N 1.1282°W

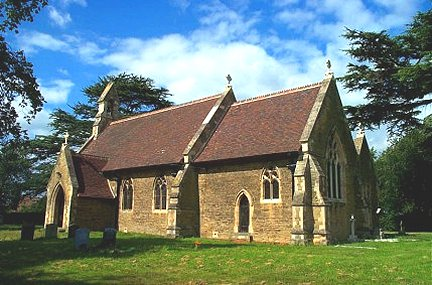
The church, in 2002

St John's Church is an Anglican church in Acaster Selby, a village south of York, in England.

Until 1850, Acaster Selby fell within the parish of Stillingfleet, with a church on the opposite side of the River Ouse. In 1833, eleven members of the choir drowned while crossing the river, and this spurred the construction of a church in Acaster Selby. It was designed by John Loughborough Pearson, completed in 1850, and dedicated to John the Evangelist. It was granted its own parish, although in 1875 this was merged with that of neighbouring Appleton Roebuck, with All Saints' Church, Appleton Roebuck becoming the parish church. The church was Grade II listed in 1978.

The Gothic Revival church is built of sandstone, with limestone dressings and a tiled roof. It has a four-bay nave with a south porch, and a two-bay chancel with a vestry to the north-east. On the west gable, there is a bellcote. The porch has an opening with a pointed arch and a double-chamfered surround, and a door with a moulded surround and a hood mould, and there is a priest's door with a chamfered architrave and a hood mould. Most of the windows have two lights and have tracery in the Decorated style. There is some original stained glass, including one window designed by Mayer and Co. The font is also 19th century.
