= Listed buildings in Acaster Selby =

Acaster Selby is a village in North Yorkshire, England. It was formerly a civil parish, but has been incorporated in the civil parish of Appleton Roebuck. The village contains four listed buildings that are recorded in the National Heritage List for England. All the listed buildings are designated at Grade II, the lowest of the three grades, which is applied to "buildings of national importance and special interest". The listed buildings consist of two farmhouses, a barn and a church.

== Buildings ==
Name and location	Photograph	Date	Notes
Manor Farm; 53.86442°N 1.12817°W		c. 1660–70	Originally Acaster Hall, the building has been much reduced in size. It is in reddish-brown brick on a Magnesian Limestone plinth, with a modillion floor band and a pantile roof. There are two storeys and an L-shaped plan, with a main front of three bays. The original entrance is blocked and a window inserted, it has a rusticated architrave, and is flanked by ornamental pilasters with Ionic capitals. The windows are 20th-century casements, and at the rear is a small round-arched opening and a blocked mullioned window.
College Farmhouse; 53.86664°N 1.12678°W		Early 19th century (probable)	The farmhouse is in pinkish-brown brick, with dressings in red rubbed brick, a dentilled eaves band, and a stone slate roof. There are two storeys and three bays. The middle bay projects slightly under a pediment, and contains a tripartite sash window in the ground floor and a horizontally-sliding sash window above. It is flanked by doorways with fanlights, and the other windows are a mix of sashes and casements. All the openings have red rubbed brick flat arches.
Barn, College Farm; 53.86667°N 1.12634°W		Early 19th century (probable)	The barn is in pinkish-brown brick, with stone dressings, a dentilled eaves band, and a pantile roof with moulded stone coped gables and kneelers. There are two storeys and three bays. In the centre is a round-arched entrance with imposts, the windows are casements with mullions, in the upper floor is a segmental-headed opening, and in the right gable is a partly blocked elliptical-headed opening and the remains of pigeon openings.
St John's Church; 53.86140°N 1.12815°W		1850	The church, designed by J. Loughborough Pearson, is in sandstone with limestone dressings and a tile roof. It consists of a four-bay nave with a south porch, and a two-bay chancel with northeast vestry, and on the west gable is a bellcote. The porch has an opening with a pointed arch and a double-chamfered surround, and a door with a moulded surround and a hood mould, and there is a priest's door with a chamfered architrave and a hood mould.
