= Katherine Austen =

English writer (1629–1683)

- Born: 1629; St Mary Colechurch, London, England
- Died: 1683 (aged 53–54); Hoxton, London
- Occupations: Writer, financier
- Spouse: Thomas Austen

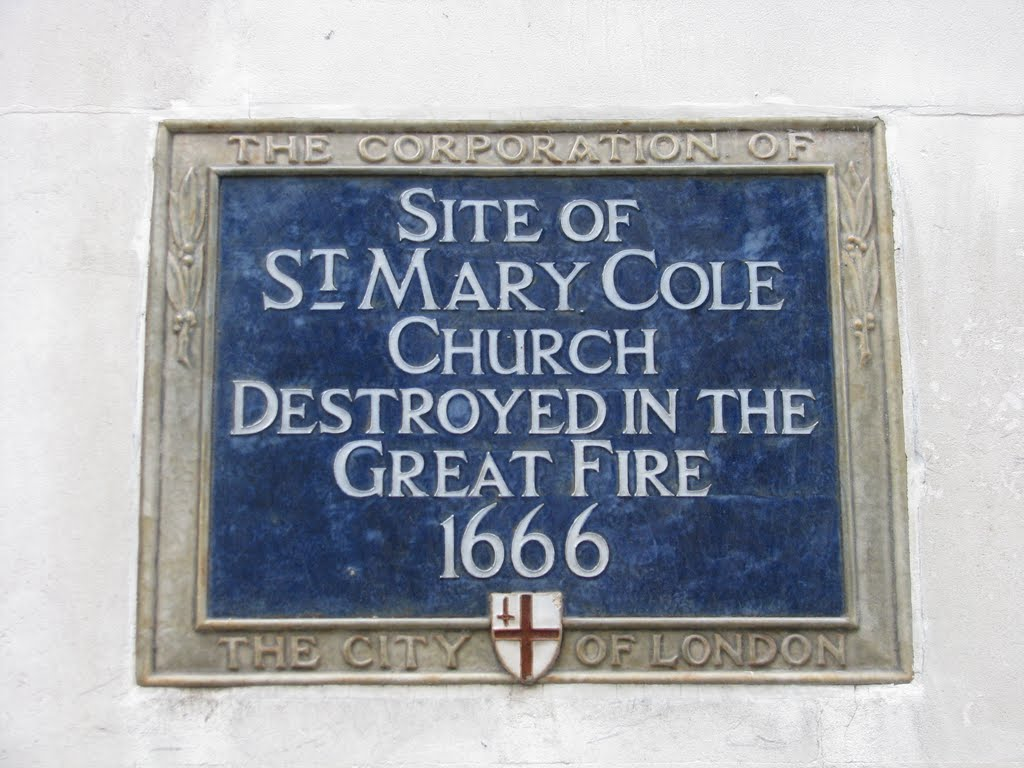
Plaque on former site of St. Mary Cole Church, in which parish Katherine Austen was born

Katherine Austen (née Wilson; 1629 – c. 1683) was an English diarist and poet best known for Book M, her manuscript collection of meditations, journal entries, and verse. "On the Situation of Highbury" (1665), a country house poem included in the collection, has received particular attention from scholars. She was also a successful financier and landowner, a status she achieved and maintained by remaining a widow for twenty-five years.

== Personal life ==
=== Early life ===
Katherine Wilson was one of at least seven children born to Katherine Wilson (née Rudd; d. 1648) and her husband Robert Wilson (d. 1639), a draper. After her father's death, her mother remarried John Highlord, an Alderman of the City of London and a Committee member of the East India Company, thereby raising the family's status.

Wilson lived in London through the period of the Civil War and Restoration. She married Thomas Austen (1622–1658), barrister, also from a wealthy family, on 10 July 1645. Her husband would seem to have shared her social ambitions; however, he died at the age of thirty-six in 1658 and left Katherine, under the age of thirty, with three young children and the complicated management of their properties.

=== Widowhood ===
Thomas Austen's will named Katherine Austen "Executrix and Guardian amid [during] her Widowhood." In effect, this phrase articulated the law at the time: widows were the only category of women legally allowed to own, acquire, or dispose of financial assets; married women and spinsters were not. Under the doctrine of coverture she retained her widow's status as an independent legal entity as long she did not remarry. Austen focused her attention on retaining her late husband's property, Highbury, for her underaged son, Thomas, and was involved in a protracted series of legal actions (see her sonnet "Upon subjects at the Committee of Parliament taking a stab at Highbury", fols. 59v-60r, and others).

In addition to administering her family's estate, Austen was busy with various other business and legal concerns. About a year after her husband died, Austen began her career as real-estate investor. Her first project extended her interests to the west coast of Wales. Records show that she was worried about the cost of some building she was undertaking at "The Swan" (near Covent Garden) while defending against lawsuits challenging her family's possession of an inn called the Red Lion, on Fleet Street. Book M records the claims of "Sister Austen" and "another troublesome man" for the Red Lion, "Sister Austen" being the widow of John, a sibling named in Thomas Austen's will who died in 1659. Katherine Austen writes of her sister-in-law, "Tis not adequate to appreciate 350 pounds forever", a reference to "the total of three hundred or three hundred and fifty pounds which he hath of mine in his grasp" left by Thomas to his sibling.

Katherine Austen's widowhood would last the rest of her life. She was, at least once, tempted by remarriage, but rejected the prospect, citing her regard for her late husband and her fears for the financial interests of her children. Her one known suitor was the Scottish doctor Alexander Callendar.

She lived in Hoxton until she died. The date of her death is unknown but her will was proved in 1683.

== Writings ==
The richest source of information about Austen is her miscellany, Book M (BL, Add. MS 4454), a manuscript of 114 folios, written over six or seven years during her period of mourning — her "Most saddest Yeares" (60r) — which includes material on financial and legal matters, interpretations of dreams (her own and others'), historical commentary, and over thirty occasional and religious lyrics on topics such as child loss, Austen's legacy to her children, a Valentine's Day gift, her prophetic interests, and the family home, Highbury. It also contains spiritual meditations, including a short essay on Hildegard of Bingen, notes on sermons, and correspondence. She wrote the miscellany primarily between 1664 and 1666 and made changes to it until 1682. Book M demonstrates her familiarity with the poetry of Richard Corbett and the sermons and possibly the poetry of John Donne.

One of her best known poems from the book is the estate poem "On the Situation of Highbury", probably written in September 1665 when she was finally positioned to legally take possession of the contested property. This short poem has generated considerable critical interest. Here is the full text:

So fairely Mounted in a fertile Soile
Affordes the dweller plesure, without Toile
Th'adjacent prospects gives so sweet a sight
That Nature did resolve to frame delight
On this faire Hill, and with a bountious load
Produce rich Burthens, makeing the aboad
As full of Joy, as where fat Vallies smile
And greater far, here Sickenes doth exhile
'Tis an Unhappy fate to paint that place
By my Unpollishet Lines, with so bad a grace
Amidst its beauty, if a streame did rise
To clear my mudy braine and Misty Eyes
And find a Hellicon t'enlarge my muse
Then I noe better place then this wud choose
In such a Laver and on this bright Hill
I Wish parnassus to adorne my quill (fol. 104r).
