= Nun Appleton Priory =

Priory in North Yorkshire, England

Coordinates: 53°51′09″N 1°09′22″W

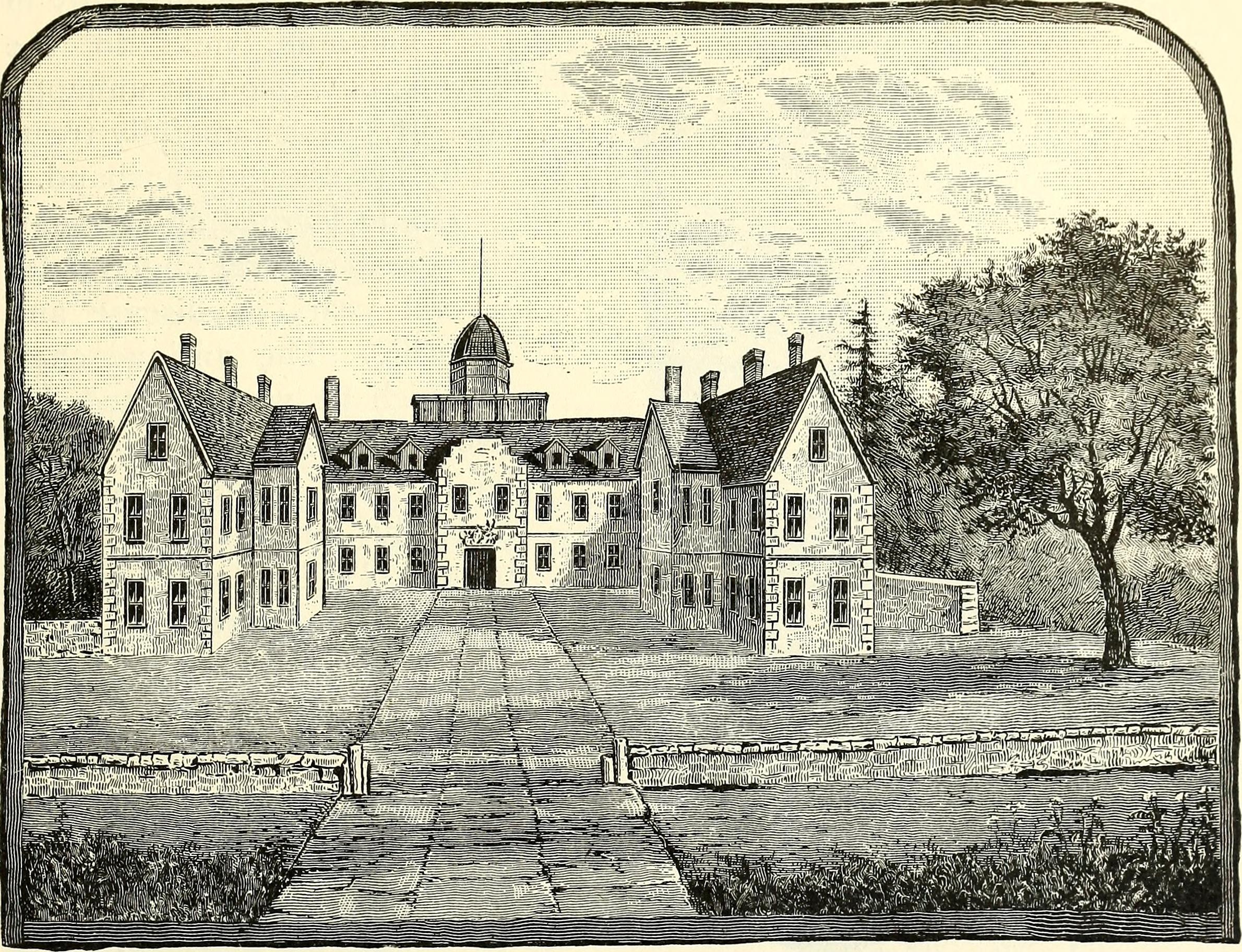
Nun Appleton Priory, 1877

Nun Appleton Priory was a priory near Appleton Roebuck, North Yorkshire, England. It was founded as a nunnery c. 1150, by Eustace de Merch and his wife. It was dissolved by 1539, when the nuns were receiving pensions.

== Nun Appleton Hall ==
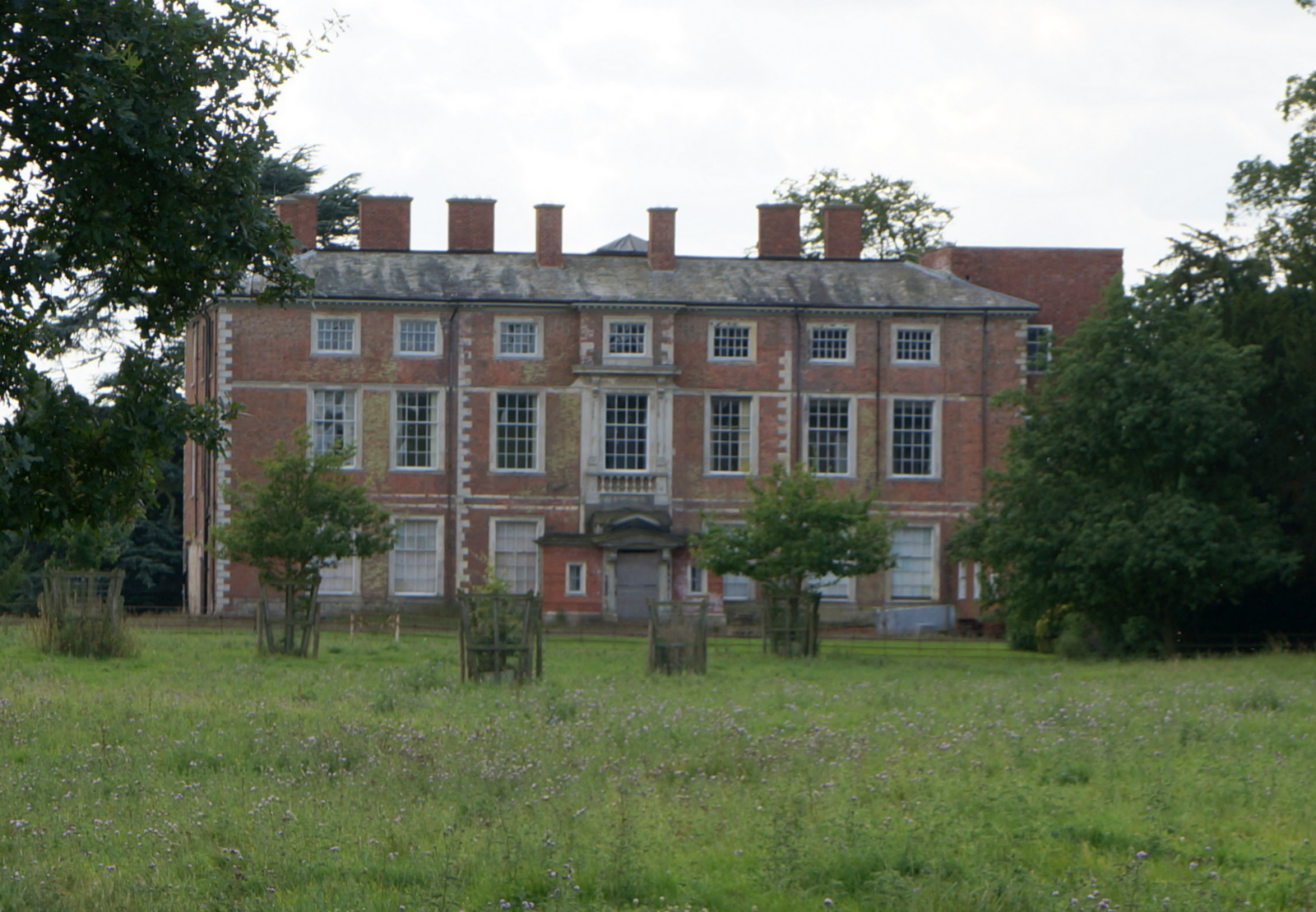
Nun Appleton Hall, 2014

Subsequently Nun Appleton was the West Riding of Yorkshire country estate of the Fairfax family.

The hall itself is built of reddish-orange brick with ashlar dressings and a Welsh slate roof in three storeys to a rectangular floor plan. It is grade II listed and now stands in some 200 ha. of parkland.

The estate was acquired by The 1st Lord Fairfax of Cameron, a Yorkshireman with a Scottish peerage, following the Dissolution of the Monasteries, from whom it descended to The 3rd Lord Fairfax of Cameron, the well-known English Civil War commander, who built the present hall in the late 1600s. In his time (c. 1651) the estate was the inspiration for Andrew Marvell's Upon Appleton House, a significant country house poem. Marvell was tutor to Thomas Fairfax's daughter, Mary. After the death of Mary (who had married The 2nd Duke of Buckingham) in 1704 the estate was eventually sold c. 1711 to Alderman William Milner of Leeds who carried out many alterations to the house.

His son William was created the 1st Milner Baronet, of Nun Appleton Hall in the County of York, in 1717 and was later Member of Parliament for York. The estate then descended in the Milner family until 1875, when the estate's owner, Sir William Mordaunt Milner, 6th Baronet, was more interested in gambling than looking after it. By 1877 it had been leased to William Beckett-Denison, a wealthy Leeds banker. After the death of Sir William Milner in Cairo in 1881, his brother Frederick inherited the estate and in 1882 married Adeline, eldest daughter of William Beckett-Denison. After William Beckett's gruesome death in 1890, the Hall and estate were sold to Angus Holden, a sometime M.P. (later created Baron Holden), a woollen manufacturer from Bradford, whose ownership was somewhat brief as he died in 1912.

The hall was now empty and many of the tenanted farms were sold. The estate was put up for auction in 1914 and again in 1917 and eventually acquired by a private company which felled many of the trees but by 1919 had gone into liquidation. It was bought in 1920 by Sir Benjamin Dawson, 1st Baronet, another Bradford textile manufacturer, who was High Sheriff of Yorkshire for 1951–52. During the Second World War the hall was taken over by the London Maternity Hospital. When the stable block accidentally burnt down it was afterwards refurbished as a theatre and made available to the local community.

The property was bought from the last occupant, Sir Benjamin's daughter Joan Dawson, for £1.2 million in the 1980s by Humphrey Smith of the Samuel Smith brewing family. In 2015 the house was reported to be fenced off, empty, unused and deteriorating. However as of 2024 renovation work has commenced.

Nun Appleton Priory played an important part in the career of the young composer William Baines (1899–1922). He was befriended by the Dawsons in 1921, and was inspired by the house and its grounds to write many of his "nature" pieces for piano, including Twilight Woods and Glancing Sunlight.

== See also ==
- Listed buildings in Appleton Roebuck
