= The Garden (poem) =

17th-century poem by Andrew Marvell

"The Garden" is a widely anthologized poem by the seventeenth-century English poet, Andrew Marvell. The poem was first published posthumously in Miscellaneous Poems (1681). “The Garden” is one of several poems by Marvell to feature gardens, including his “Nymph Complaining for the Death of her Fawn”, “The Mower Against Gardens”, and “Upon Appleton House”.

“The Garden” participates in the classical tradition of pastoral poetry, an ancient form that was influential for many English Renaissance poets. Inspired by the idealized scenes of rural life and rural values in poems like the Idylls of Theocritus, Virgil’s Eclogues, and parts of Horace’s Epistles and Odes, Marvell is seen to have followed the ancients in celebrating the virtues of simple nature.

The opposition between “the active and the contemplative life” has its root in ancient Greek philosophy. Plato, the Stoics, and the Epicureans had all favoured retirement while also acknowledging the need to engage in public obligation when the situation required. Aristotle said that "we are only unleisurely in order that we may be at leisure". Marvell’s “The Garden”, therefore, can be viewed as a continuation of this ancient debate.

Marvell was well-read in the classical tradition; some critics have called the range of his classical engagement "extreme". He recast much of "The Garden" in a Latin poem, "Hortus", printed to follow "The Garden" in Miscellaneous Poems.

Critics have commented that the poem's pastoralism works against the tradition in several ways, particularly through its strong association of the garden with a retreat from women and erotic love.

== Synopsis ==
The first two stanzas of “The Garden” introduce the theme of pastoral otium (retirement, contemplation, and ease) associated with Horace. The poem's speaker rejects worldly ambitions and society in favor of the quiet, innocence, and solitude of the garden.

But in the 3rd stanza, the poem’s pastoralism begins to work against convention. Alluding to a moment in Virgil’s Eclogues 10 when a pastoral lover carves his mistresses’ name into the bark of a tree, Marvell’s speaker denounces such "Fond lovers, cruel as their flame", preferring instead to "wound" his trees only with their own names. Preferring the beauty of trees to that of women, Marvell's speaker rejects the conventional lovers' colors–"white" and "red"–in favor of the "lovely green" of the garden.

The poem’s 4th stanza continues to identify the garden with a retreat from sexuality. It includes allusions to the myths of Apollo and Daphne and Pan and Syrinx from Ovid’s Metamorphoses, stories that both describe a nymph’s escape from threatened rape through transforming into a plant. The speaker claims that "Apollo hunted Daphne so, / Only that she might laurel grow; / And Pan did after Syrinx speed, not as nymph, but for a reed." Critics agree that Marvell twists these stories to imply that the Gods pursue the plants rather than the women. Some critics argue that Marvell’s refiguring of these myths away from their sexual content shows that the poem doesn’t take itself seriously.

In stanza 5 the speaker eroticizes the garden as an alternative to a female lover. Marvell may have drawn inspiration from an ode by Casimire Sarbiewski, retelling The Song of Solomon, and from the pastoral topos of the Golden Age, in which nature provides of itself spontaneously. Marvell’s speaker notes that "Ripe apples drop about my head" and that "The nectarine, and curious peach, / Into my hands themselves do reach." It has been argued that this stanza also references Book VIII of Pliny's Natural Historie, in which the Goddess Pomona describes how her fruits offer themselves to men The imagery here is notably lush, fecund, and sensuous, but the stanza once again shows discomfort with sensuality by also associating pastoral abundance with the Christian Fall of Man: “Stumbling on melons, as I pass, / Insnared with flow’rs, I fall on grass.”

In the sixth and seventh stanzas, the speaker retreats from bodily experience into his own mind: “Annihilating all that’s made / To a green thought in a green shade.” This line also demonstrates Marvell's concern with the destructive power of the mind over the natural world.

The poem's ambivalent attitude towards sexuality and erotic attachment culminates in the 8th stanza, in which the speaker invokes the Biblical Garden of Eden, “that happy garden-state”, but here conjured before the creation of Eve. The poem identifies “Paradise” with the time when “man there walked without a mate”. As critic Nicholas Murray comments, the Edenic state in "The Garden" is a "state of unsexual bliss where pleasure was solitary”. Critic Jonathan Crewe argues that the phrase "garden-state" "captures the tendency of Renaissance pastoral to originate itself in a lost paradise, often specifically Eden, but then so far as that paradise is Eden, to originate itself misogynistically as well, since to recall Eden is also to recall Eve's role in its loss".

The final stanza of the poem contains an image of a sundial made of herbs and flowers. With the return of human time, the poem’s retreat ends ambiguously, ironizing pastoralism’s “ambition to step outside of culture”.

== Critical reception ==
In the 19th and 20th centuries, “The Garden” was celebrated for its universal appeal and beautiful depiction of natural beauty; an anonymous critic praised these themes favorably in contrast to Marvell’s satirical approach in his later work. Although it has been predominantly perceived as a pastoral poem, 19th-century critic Edmond Gosse argued that Marvell’s love for nature as shown in “The Garden” was innovative for the seventeenth century and a thematic precursor to William Wordsworth’s metaphysical nature poetry. The Garden” has also been recognized for its metaphysical conceits reminiscent of John Donne and Abraham Cowley. Critics have noted the relative lack of religious Puritan influence in the work despite Marvell’s cultural background in Puritanism, contrasting Marvell’s work with the more religious focus of John Bunyan. In contrast, satirist Samuel Butler incorporated allusions from “The Garden” in his defense of the ecclesiastical politics that Marvell had critiqued in his play, The Rehearsal Transpros’d (1672). Butler incorporated references to Marvell’s poetry, which was relatively unknown at the time, to portray Marvell’s personality and preferences in a negative light and diminish the credibility of Marvell’s opposing religious views.

Critics debate when "The Garden", along with much of Marvell's poetry, was written. Critic Alan Pritchard claims that “The Garden” may have been written after the Stuart Restoration rather than during the earlier 1650-1653 'Fairfax period' when Marvell was most closely associated with Lord General Thomas Fairfax.

There is also a controversy/critical debate surrounding the dates of composition of Milton's Paradise Lost in relation to "The Garden". John Aubrey, Milton’s biographer, claims that Paradise Lost, published in 1667, was begun in 1658 and finished in 1663, though he asserts that some parts were certainly written even earlier. While Marvell and Milton were contemporaries, the question remains as to whether Paradise Lost was inspired by “The Garden” or vice versa.

== Critical lenses ==
=== Gender and sexuality ===
Critic Frank Kermode notes the way in which a distaste for women is established throughout "The Garden". For Marvell, there is no room for women in the garden. Women are seen as the enemy throughout the poem, and set in contrast to the pleasures of nature. Marvell establishes that the removal of women in the garden is necessary in order for the serene innocence of the garden to survive. Critics also claim that other Marvell poems also portray adult women as a threat to solitude, praising non-erotic love and the “innocence that precedes sexual knowledge".

Critical discourse surrounding Marvell’s sexuality provides potential context as to why “The Garden” appears so uncomfortable with women and with adult female sexuality. Marvell’s personal life appears to align with the romanticization of solitude in the poem. Marvell never married and generally lived alone, which parallels the speaker's experience in “The Garden”. Critics thus tend to speculate that Marvell had no interest in women, though whether or not his aversion to women explains his preference for solitude remains unclear.

Critic Paul Hammond has also argued that Marvell’s sexual innuendos lend themselves to homoerotic interpretations. Specifically, contemporary pamphlets critiquing Marvell tend to parody his sexual interests by making light of his aversion to women, and Hammond argues that reading Marvell’s poetry through the lens of these pamphlets allows for homoerotic interpretations of his poetry.

=== Christianity ===
Some contemporary critics indicate that religion played a pivotal role in Marvell’s poetry, and is an important theme throughout his works. In addition to religion itself, Marvell’s works reference works of those who are religious such as of his peers and contemporaries such as John Milton. In the 17th century, poetic and dramatic exploration of Christianity was common, with works like Milton's Paradise Lost rising to popularity, and critics agree that these influences infiltrate Marvell’s poetry.

Critic Barry Weller notes that both “The Garden” and Marvell's poem, “The Mower to the Glowworm”, reference Paradise Lost by including versions of "falls". However, Weller categorizes these falls as “pratfalls”, or comic events. Weller also claims that Milton's Paradise Regained retrospectively recategorizes Paradise Lost as a pastoral poem, similar to “The Garden”.

=== Ecocriticism ===
Marvell's concern with natural environments in his poetry has been of interest to recent ecological critics, though as critic Andrew McRae argues, “it is important to appreciate that this was a culture with only a rudimentary interest in what we understand as ecology”. Some critics contend that “The Garden” was part of a larger surge in 17th- century Christian environmental poetry before Cartesian dualism rendered most Christian literature fundamentally unecological. Marvell and his contemporaries renounced symbolism and instead presented detailed observations as proof that the physical and spiritual are intrinsically intertwined. Interestingly, the vitalistic beliefs presented by “The Garden” and some of Marvell’s other works are shared by a wide array of contemporary environmental writers, such as John Muir and Leslie Marmon Silko, which potentially illustrates Marvell’s lasting influence on environmental literature.

== Related works ==
=== Upon Appleton House ===
Marvell's poem “Upon Appleton House” is commonly mentioned alongside “The Garden”. Both drawing upon descriptions of nature, the two poems converge in their reflections on solitude. Moreover, as the complete title, “Upon Appleton House, to my Lord Fairfax”, suggests, Marvell dedicates this poem explicitly to his patron, Sir Thomas Fairfax, who at that time led a reclusive life at his estate in Nunappleton. Written presumably around the same time, "The Garden" is likely a tribute to Fairfax as well. Yet, as J.B. Leishman argues in The Art of Marvell’s Poetry, “The Garden” is more argumentative and nuanced, adopting a paradoxical attitude towards a contemplative life and the solitude it appears to advocate.

=== Hortus ===
Marvell's “Hortus” is a Latin counterpart of “The Garden”, as the title “Hortus” is the Latin word for “Garden”. There is still ongoing debate about which poem was composed first. Critics argue that the lack of “Neoplatonic” ideas in “Hortus” leads to its reduced complexity in terms of content. The language of “Hortus” is also simpler than that of “The Garden” and the speaker's tone is less witty and arch. Both poems explore power, sexual love, and nature but from slightly different stances. While "Hortus" stresses the opposition between sexual love and the love of nature by suggesting that nature tames love, “The Garden” deems sexual love as a threat to nature and the contemplative life sought in the Garden.
