= John Milton's relationships =

John Milton was involved in many relationships, romantic and not, that impacted his various works and writings.

== Marriage ==
=== Mary Powell ===
Milton married Mary Powell in May 1642, and, shortly after, she left him and returned to live with her mother. He wanted to divorce her to marry another, but the legal statutes of England did not allow for Milton to apply for a divorce. Although it is impossible to know why exactly Powell separated from Milton, it is possible that Powell's family, a strong royalist family, caused a political difference that was exacerbated by the English Civil War. Regardless of her reason, the action motivated Milton towards researching and eventually writing on the topic. During his research, he read a work of Martin Bucer discussing divorce, which encouraged him to take up the arguments and pursue a reform of the English divorce laws.

Milton began writing a series of divorce tracts. Sometime between 1642 and 1645, Milton met and attempted to pursue another woman known only as Miss Davis. During his involvement with her, he attempted to convince her that his marriage should have resulted in a divorce and that it would be appropriate for her to marry him although he was already legally married; this resulted in failure. However, this did not dissuade his campaign to reform the divorce laws, and he continued to pursue the topic until his wife returned to him. This reconciliation could have come in part from the failure of the royalists, including Powell's family, to prevail during the English Civil War and the lack of justification to further distance themselves from Milton.

=== Katherine Woodcock ===
Milton and Powell's marriage lasted until 1652; Powell died while giving birth to Deborah, the couple's third daughter. Her death was followed by the death of John, their infant and only son. Milton married Katherine Woodcock in 1656. This marriage was far more successful than Milton's previous, but, like his first wife, Woodcock died from complications experienced while giving birth. By this time, Milton had fully succumbed to blindness and had to raise his three daughters. This put significant strain on Milton, and matters were only complicated further when Oliver Cromwell died in 1658 and the Commonwealth fell apart.

=== Elizabeth Mynshull ===
Milton was married for a third time on 24 February 1662, this time to Elizabeth Mynshull (1638-1728). There was a 31-year age-gap between them, but in spite of this Milton's marriage to her seems to have been happy. Indeed, Elizabeth was described as Milton's "Third and best wife." After Milton's death, Mynshull never remarried. Milton died without leaving a will, leading to a dispute between Milton's daughters and Mynshull, who had been verbally promised Milton's estate.

== Friendship ==
=== Charles Diodati ===
Until his marriage, Milton was involved in only one close relationship: his friendship with Charles Diodati (1608?–1638). They were schoolboys together at St Paul's School and kept up a correspondence. This exchange prompted Milton's Elegy 1.

Diodati was the nephew of Giovanni Diodati, a member of a prominent Italian Calvinist family originally from Lucca. Diodati's father Theodore was a court and fashionable Swiss-Italian physician in England, with a practice in London; he himself became a physician after studying at Oxford, in Chester and then in London. When Diodati died, Milton composed an elegy entitled Epitaphium Damonis in his friend's memory, and included a headnote saying that they "had pursued the same studies" and that they were the "most intimate friends from childhood on".

=== Andrew Marvell ===
On 21 February 1653, Milton recommended Andrew Marvell for a position with the Commonwealth's Council of State as his assistant after his previous assistant died. It is uncertain when the two first met, but Marvell knew Milton's works and included similar themes within his own poetry a few years prior. Milton liked Marvell, and in his recommendation describes Marvell as

a man whom both by report, & converse I have had with him, of singular desert for the state to make us of; who also offers himselfe, if there by any imployment for him... if upon the death of Mr. Wakerly the Councell shall think that I shall need any assistant in the performance of my place (though for my part I find noe encumberances of that which belongs to me, except it be in point of attendance at Conferences with Ambassadors, which I much confesse, in my Condition I am not fit for) it would be hard for them to find a Man soe fit every way for the purpose as this Gentleman

The Council did not accept Marvell, and they instead made Philip Meadowes, a diplomat, assistant to Milton. By September 1657, Marvell was finally allowed to be Milton's assistant, and the two become close. During this time, John Dryden was employed in the same office and, according to Barbara Lewalski, it was "A remarkable happenstance, that the three best poets of the age should be together at the same time in Cromwell's bureaucracy!"

=== Nathan Paget ===
Paget was a physician, on friendly terms with Milton from around 1651, and a cousin of his third wife Elizabeth.

== Literary ==
=== Thomas Hobbes ===
There is little known about a direct relationship, if there was any, between Milton and Thomas Hobbes except for one passage from John Aubrey's Minutes of the Life of Mr. John Milton: "His widow assures me that Mr. T. Hobbes was not one of his acquaintances, that her husband did not like him at all, but he would acknowledge him to be a man of great parts, and a learned man. There interests and tenets did run counter to each other".

This does not stop scholars from wanting to compare these two contemporaries together, especially with their conflicting ideas on politics. To Marjorie Nicolson, Milton spent his life combating and counteracting the philosophy of Hobbes, an individual that he believed was "The Atheist and Arch Heretic". However, this view was challenged a decade later by George Williamson, who believed that, in terms of philosophy and not theology or politics, Milton and Hobbes held similar beliefs. These views became two extremes of a debate on the relationship between the two, and Nathaniel Henry, to try to find a compromise between both sides, argued that both were wrong because "Hobbes was no atheist" and that "Milton and Hobbes were in reality somewhat opposed in their views".

Henry argued that the only way to determine an intellectual relationship between the two men was to analyse how their philosophical views, and, particularly, "Milton's views on the soul must be considered from a wider point of view". The view that Milton held of the soul was the Anabaptist idea of soul sleeping. Hobbes, according to Henry, was a follower of John Calvin's Psychopannychia, which "was a tract against the 'Anabaptist' doctrine of the sleep of the soul between death and resurrection, separating the two further.

The two were also opposed in their views on how best to prevent Catholicism to enter into England. Milton believed that the only way to stop Catholicism was to remove all centralised government and liturgical practices and, according to Timothy Rosendale, "he flatly denounces the liturgy as 'evil'" and as a "popish relic". Hobbes argued that this decentralisation could not have this effect because, as Patricia Springborg points out, the "national religions of the Reformed Church still retained theological doctrines which could give Roman Catholicism a foot-hold in the realm".
