= All Saints' Church, Appleton Roebuck =

Church in Appleton Roebuck, North Yorkshire, England

Coordinates: 53°52′24″N 1°09′29″W

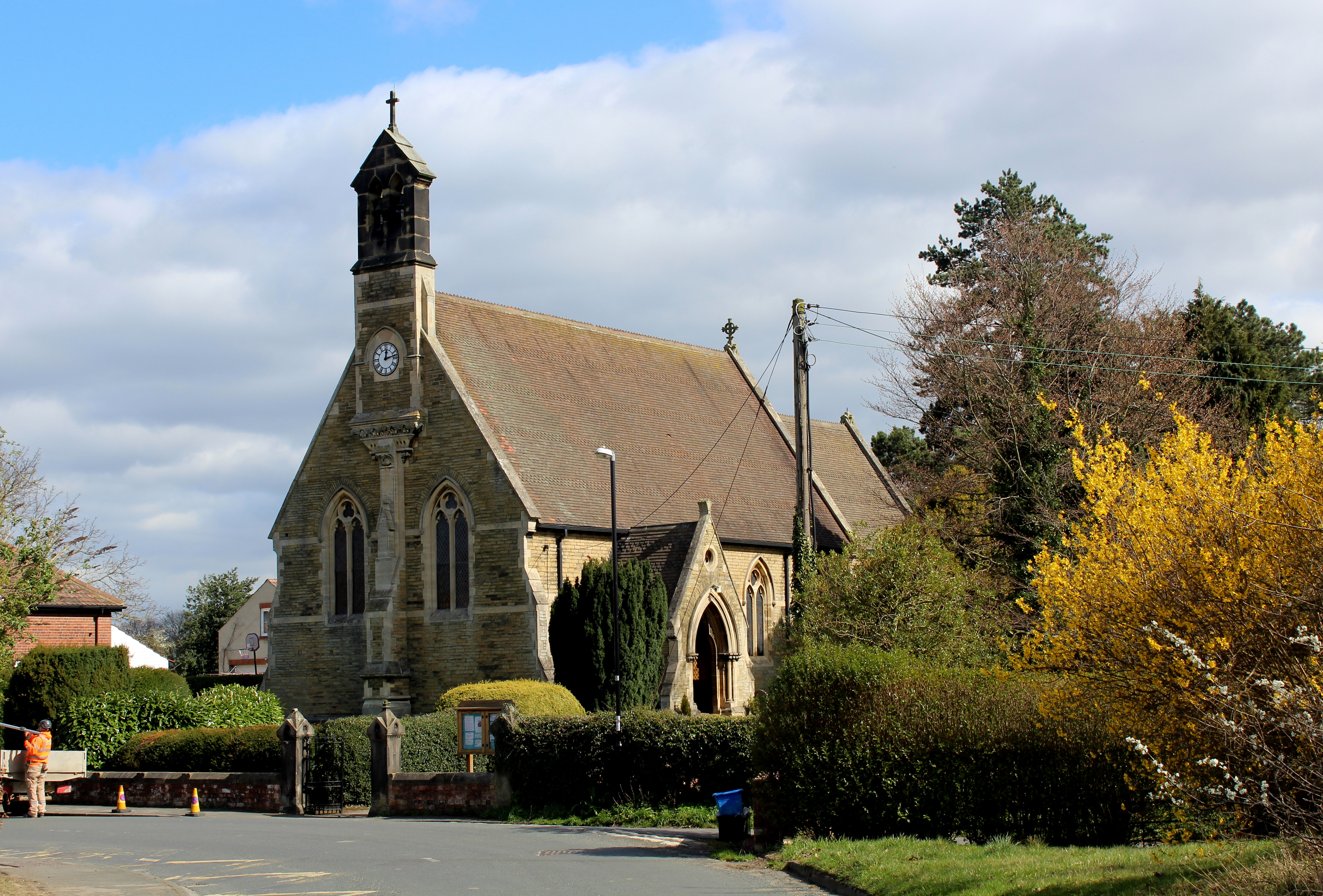
The church, in 2019

All Saints' Church is the parish church of Appleton Roebuck, a village south-west of York, in England.

Until 1868, Appleton Roebuck was in the parish of Bolton Percy. That year, a church was constructed in the village, designed by John Bownas and William Atkinson. In 1875, the parish was merged with that of neighbouring Acaster Selby, though All Saints remained the parish church. The church was grade II listed in 1978.

The church is built in sandstone, with red brick in the interior, and it has a tile roof. It consists of a four-bay nave with a south porch, and a two-bay chancel with a north vestry. At the west end is a twin bellcote below which is a clock face. Most of the windows have two lights, while the east window has three, and they are in the Geometrical style. The nave has a higher roof than the chancel. Inside, there is a hammerbeam roof, and the chancel arch is supported on black marble piers. One stained glass window on the south side of the nave is by Charles Eamer Kempe.

== See also ==
- Listed buildings in Appleton Roebuck
