= Listed buildings in Appleton Roebuck =

Appleton Roebuck is a civil parish in the county of North Yorkshire, England. It contains twelve listed buildings that are recorded in the National Heritage List for England. All the listed buildings are designated at Grade II, the lowest of the three grades, which is applied to "buildings of national importance and special interest". The parish contains the village of Appleton Roebuck and the surrounding countryside. The listed buildings in the village include houses, a public house, a church, a chapel and a war memorial. Outside the village they consist of a former windmill, a farmhouse and farm buildings, and a small country house.

== Buildings ==
Name and location	Photograph	Date	Notes
Nun Appleton Hall; 53.85244°N 1.15566°W		Late 17th century	A small country house that has been altered and extended. It is in reddish-orange brick on a plinth, with stone dressings, quoins, a moulded floor band, a dentilled and modillion cornice, and a hipped Welsh slate roof. There are three storeys and seven bays, projecting in the centre. The later porch has double doors with pilasters, a fanlight and a hood. The windows are sashes in moulded architraves, the central window in the middle floor with a vase balustrade and acanthus consoles carrying a hood.
Holme Green Farmhouse; 53.86619°N 1.15655°W	—	Mid to late 18th century	The farmhouse is in pinkish-brown brick on a plinth of Magnesian limestone, with a dentilled eaves band and a pantile roof. There are three storeys and three bays, and a rear range. The central doorway has a segmental arch and a fanlight. The windows are sashes, those on the front with segmental arches, and at the rear with elliptical arches.
Roebuck Inn; 53.87297°N 1.16061°W		Mid to late 18th century	A private house, later a public house, in pinkish-brown brick with a pantile roof. There are two storeys and four bays, and a rear outshut. The central doorway has a cambered arch. The windows are sashes, those in the ground floor with cambered arches, and to the left is a later bow window.
Bell Hill House; 53.87311°N 1.15960°W	—	Late 18th century	The house is in pinkish-brown brick, and has a Welsh slate roof. There are two storeys and three bays. On the front is a gabled porch and a doorway with a fanlight. The windows are sashes, those in the ground floor with segmental arches.
Barn, Holme Green Farm; 53.86673°N 1.15660°W	—	Late 18th century	The barn is in pinkish-brown brick, and has a swept pantile roof, and a rear range. It contains a central cart entrance with a double door under a segmental arch, and slit vents. In the right gable end is an owl hole.
The Old Vicarage; 53.87361°N 1.16149°W	—	Late 18th century	The vicarage, later a private house, is in pinkish-brown brick, and has a pantile roof with two courses of stone slate at the eaves, and stone coping. There are two storeys, three bays, and a rear range. The central doorway has a fanlight, the windows are sashes, and all the openings have wedge lintels and fluted keystones.
Southfield; 53.87290°N 1.15930°W	—	Late 18th to early 19th century	The house is in pinkish-orange brick with a dentilled eaves band, and a pantile roof with brick coping. There are two storeys and three bays, and a rear range. The central doorway has a fanlight, the windows are sashes, and all the openings have flat rubbed brick arches.
Wesleyan Methodist Chapel; 53.87333°N 1.16126°W		1818	The chapel is in pinkish-brown brick, with a hipped pantile roof. There is a single storey and three bays. In the centre is a round-arched doorway with a radial fanlight, and in the outer bays are round-arched sash windows. On the front is an inscribed and dated plaque.
The Maltings; 53.87337°N 1.16045°W	—	Early 19th century	The house is in pinkish-brown brick with a grey tile roof. There are two storeys and three bays, and rear ranges. In the centre is a doorway with pilasters, a fanlight, a frieze and a modillion hood. It is flanked by canted bay windows, and in the upper floor are sash windows with cambered arches.
Windmill; 53.87551°N 1.17596°W		Early 19th century	The former windmill is a tower mill in reddish-brown brick. It is tapering, and has a circular plan. There are two entrances in the ground floor and windows above, all with segmental-arched heads.
All Saints' Church; 53.87345°N 1.15792°W		1868	The church is built in sandstone, with red brick in the interior, and it has a tile roof. It consists of a four-bay nave with a south porch, and a two-bay chancel with a north vestry. At the west end is a twin bellcote below which is a clock face.
War memorial 53.87351°N 1.15827°W	—	1921	The war memorial is in the churchyard of All Saints' Church, and is in Portland stone. It consists of a wheel-cross about 2.5 metres (8 ft 2 in) high, decorated with a Celtic design, on a tapering shaft on a base of one step. On the base are inscriptions and the names of those lost in the two World Wars.
