= Moreby Hall =

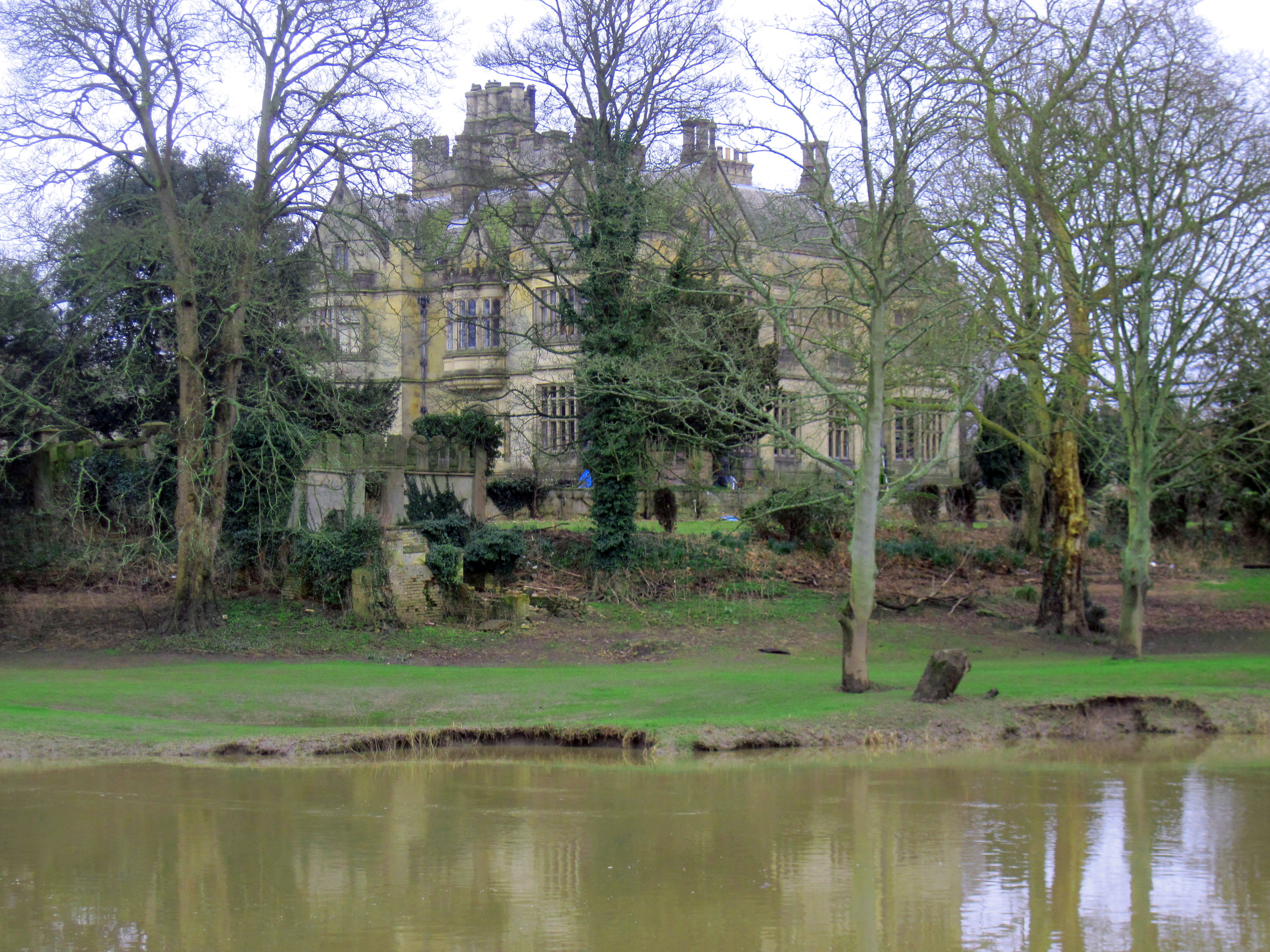

- Location within North Yorkshire

General information
- Type: Country house
- Architectural style: Jacobean
- Classification: Grade II*-listed
- Location: Stillingfleet, North Yorkshire, England
- Coordinates: 53°52′46.8″N 1°5′21.0″W
- Construction started: 1828
- Completed: 1832

Technical details
- Grounds: 12.3 acres (4.97 ha)

Design and construction
- Architect: Anthony Salvin

Moreby Hall is a Grade II*-listed early 19th-century manor house and estate in Stillingfleet, North Yorkshire, England, on the River Ouse. The manor was designed by architect Anthony Salvin for Henry Preston, the High Sheriff of Yorkshire, in 1828.

== History ==
Moreby Hall and its park lies on previously populated village called Moreby or Moorby, the Scandinavian word for "farmstead on the marsh".

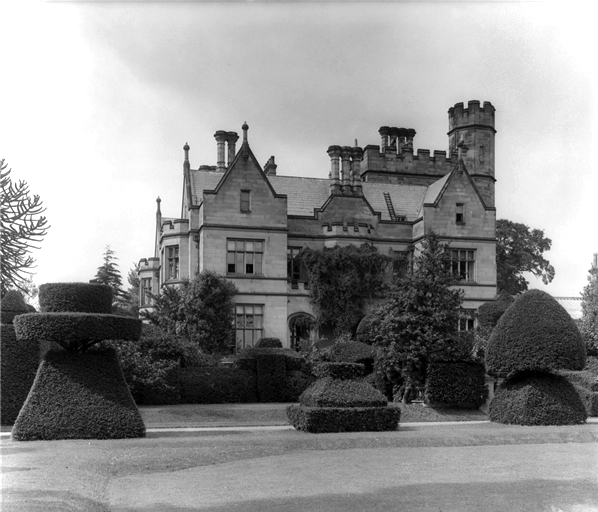
Moreby Hall, 1907

A 1907 profile on Moreby Hall in Country Life magazine states that, "The township anciently contained two carucates of land held of the King in capite by knight's service and a sixpenny rent severally. Now we read the quaint record that Moreby is held of the Crown by the service of rendering a red rose when the Sheriff may demand it."

A family at this time took its name from the village; a knight, Sir Robert de Moreby, appears on the records (d. 1335). His ancestor, also Sir Robert de Moreby, had a daughter who married Sir William Acclom (or Acklam) in the 15th century. The Accloms then took up residence at the original Moreby Hall. Stillingfleet's church, St Helen's, includes a memorial to John Acclom of Moreby (d. 1611), and of his wife, Isabel. The church has a section called Moreby Chapel, the burial site for the de Moreby family, dating to the era of Edward III.

The house was next owned by the Lawson family. Reverend George Lawson, was succeeded in turn by his son, also George Lawson, who in 1636 married the daughter of Marmaduke Boswell. Their son, Marmaduke Lawson, had two sons, but no grandchildren. Marmaduke's wife, Susannah, was the daughter of John Preston, the Mayor of Leeds in 1692. The estate then passed to Susannah's nephew, Thomas Preston, who in turned passed it to his nephew, Henry Preston (1779–1857).

== Current hall ==
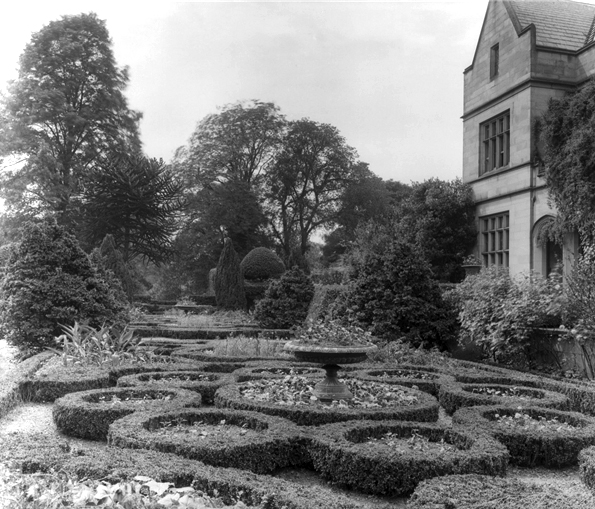
Moreby Hall garden, 1907

In 1814, Henry Preston married Maria, the eldest daughter of Joshua Compton of Esholt Hall in Yorkshire. Preston, the High Sheriff of Yorkshire, commissioned architect Anthony Salvin to build a new manor in 1828. The cost of the construction, completed in 1832, was £40,000 (equivalent to £3,760,320 in 2025).

Moreby Hall was Salvin's second major country house in the Tudor style, which Pevsner notes is "highly accomplished work for one not yet thirty." Moreby was constructed of sandstone ashlar with a roof of Welsh slate.

The interior of the house features a dining room with a coffered ceiling and a Jacobethan marble fireplace. Chinese bird wallpaper, c. 18th century, still hangs on the walls of the drawing room.

In his 1872 book, A History of the Gothic Revival, Sir Charles Eastlake called Moreby Hall an early example of "a gradual return to the manorial Gothic of old English mansions."

The terraced gardens slope down towards the River Ouse.

Moreby Hall was listed Grade II* in 1966.

== Ownership ==
The Preston family still owned Moreby Hall until the 20th century.

Moreby Hall sits on 12.3 acres (4.97 ha) of land. It was put on the market for £2.8 million in 2014. The mansion was converted into 11 luxury apartments, which went up for sale in 2024.

== See also ==
- Grade II* listed buildings in North Yorkshire
- Listed buildings in Stillingfleet
