= Listed buildings in Stillingfleet =

Stillingfleet is a civil parish in the county of North Yorkshire, England. It contains 18 listed buildings that are recorded in the National Heritage List for England. Of these, one is listed at Grade I, the highest of the three grades, one is at Grade II*, the middle grade, and the others are at Grade II, the lowest grade. The parish contains the village of Stillingfleet and the surrounding countryside. The most important buildings in the parish are St Helen's Church, and the country house, Moreby Hall, both of which are listed, together with structures in the grounds of Moreby Hall. The other listed buildings are houses, farmhouses, and a bridge.

== Key ==
Grade	Criteria
I	Buildings of exceptional interest, sometimes considered to be internationally important
II*	Particularly important buildings of more than special interest
II	Buildings of national importance and special interest

== Buildings ==
Name and location	Photograph	Date	Notes	Grade
St Helen's Church; 53.86190°N 1.09941°W		c. 1145	The church has been altered and expanded through the centuries, including a restoration in 1877–78 by C. Hodgson Fowler. It is built in magnesian limestone with a red tile roof, and consists of a nave, a north aisle, a south porch, a south chapel, a chancel with a north chapel, and a west tower. The tower has two stages, angle buttresses, a lancet window on the west, and a band. On the south side is a round-arched recess with a mullioned window. The bell openings have two lights, and above is an embattled parapet with pinnacles. The round-arched south doorway is richly decorated, with five orders, a hood mould and a gargoyle. On the north side is a re-set 12-century priest's doorway with a moulded surround.	I
Traceried window southwest of Moreby Hall; 53.88082°N 1.09524°W	—	14th century (probable)	The window is in magnesian limestone, and has an oblong plan about 3 metres (9.8 ft) in height and 1.5 metres (4 ft 11 in) in width. It has a moulded architrave and contains remains of tracery.	II
Swallow House; 53.85971°N 1.10305°W	—	Late 16th century (probable)	The house is timber framed, with pinkish-brown brick on the ground floor and a Welsh slate roof. There are two storeys and two bays. The entrance is at the rear and the windows are casements. Inside, there is exposed timber framing.	II
Haverland Farmhouse; 53.87223°N 1.10779°W		c. 1700	The farmhouse is in brick on a plinth, with a moulded floor band, and a pantile roof with raised stone coped gables. There are two storeys and five bays. The doorway is in the centre, and the windows on the front are sashes. At the rear is a doorway, casement windows, and a horizontal sliding sash window.	II
Stillingfleet House; 53.86196°N 1.11878°W	—	c. 1810	The house is in gault brick on a plinth, with stone dressings, a floor band, and a hipped Welsh slate roof. There are two storeys and three bays, the middle bay projecting under a dentilled pediment containing an oculus with keystones in the pediment, and a recessed single-storey two-bay wing on the right. On the front is a doorway with Doric pilasters and an inner arch with a fanlight, a fluted keystone, and columns carrying an open segmental pediment. The windows are sashes with wedge lintels and fluted keystones.	II
Rose Villa; 53.86148°N 1.10159°W		Early 18th century	The house is in pinkish-brown brick, with red brick dressings and quoins, and a hipped pantile roof. There are two storeys and three bays. The central doorway has pilasters a radial fanlight, a frieze and a hood. The windows are sashes with quoined jambs and flat arches of gauged brick.	II
Stillingfleet Bridge; 53.86109°N 1.09932°W		1826	The bridge carries York Road over Stillingfleet Beck. It is in sandstone and consists of a single arch with voussoirs. The bridge is flanked by full-height pilaster buttresses, and has a parapet with rounded coping, and splayed ends with rounded piers. On the bridge is an inscribed cast iron lantern base.	II
Moreby Hall; 53.88176°N 1.09508°W		1828–33	A country house designed by Anthony Salvin, in sandstone with a Welsh slate roof. The main block is square, with a three-stage tower and stair turret, to the northwest, and a service block to the west with four ranges round a courtyard. The entrance front has three bays, the middle bay with two storeys and the outer bays projecting and gabled with two storeys and attics. Steps lead up to the central doorway with a four-centred arch and a moulded surround, flanked by mullioned and transomed windows under a continuous hood mould. Above is a rounded oriel window and a low parapet. The outer bays have two-storey embattled canted bay windows. In the central bay of the garden front is a loggia of five four-centred arches.	II*
Lakeside Folly; 53.87900°N 1.09591°W	—	c. 1832	The folly in the grounds of Moreby Hall, which incorporates earlier material, is in magnesian limestone with brick patching, and is in Gothic style. There is an oblong plan and one tall storey. On the right side is a chamfered plinth, and narrow angle pilaster buttresses with pinnacles. In the centre is an entrance with a four-centred arch, a moulded surround and chamfered jambs, and above are three heraldic shields. On the lake front are similar buttresses and two pointed windows with trefoils in the spandrels.	II
Pair of urns south of Moreby Hall; 53.88159°N 1.09499°W	—	1830s	The urns on pedestals are in cast iron, and are about 1.5 metres (4 ft 11 in) in height. The pedestals are square and decorated, and the urns have gadrooned bases, handles with masks and scrollwork, and beading to the heads.	II
Pair of urns on terrace of Moreby Hall; 53.88156°N 1.09519°W	—	1830s	The urns are on square stone plinths, and are in pinkish-red probably Lambeth-ware. The urns are wide and shallow on a fluted pedestal, and have gadrooned bases, and egg and dart molding to the rim.	II
Pair of urns to base of terrace steps, Moreby Hall; 53.88156°N 1.09458°W	—	1830s	The urns are in white artificial stone on stone pedestals, and are about 1.5 metres (4 ft 11 in) in height. They have a square plinth with a moulded cornice, and the urns have fluted sides and a water-holding base.	II
Urn southwest of Moreby Hall; 53.88147°N 1.09550°W	—	1830s	The garden urn is in white artificial stone on a plinth, and is about 1.5 metres (4 ft 11 in) in height. It has a square base, and a plinth with concave faces. The urn is on five claw feet, and is decorated with fluted latticework.	II
Urn north of Moreby Hall; 53.88221°N 1.09458°W	—	1830s	The urn is in pinkish-red Lambeth-ware on a rendered brick plinth with stone dressings. The plinth is square, about 1 metre (3 ft 3 in) in height, and has a moulded cornice. The urn is about 0.5 metres (1 ft 8 in) in height, and is decorated with the faces of eminent men.	II
Urn west of Moreby Hall; 53.88177°N 1.09544°W	—	1830s	The garden urn is in white artificial stone on a square sandstone plinth. The urn has a fluted stem, a gadrooned base, and handles on masks.	II
Urn south southwest of Moreby Hall; 53.88156°N 1.09541°W	—	1830s	The garden urn is in white artificial stone on a square sandstone plinth. The plinth has a moulded base and a moulded cornice, and the urn has a fluted stem, a gadrooned base, and handles on masks.	II
Urn west southwest of Moreby Hall; 53.88143°N 1.09560°W	—	1830s	The garden urn is in white artificial stone on a square sandstone plinth. The plinth has a moulded base and a moulded cornice, and the urn has a fluted stem, a gadrooned base, and handles on masks.	II
