= Stillingfleet =

Village and civil parish in North Yorkshire, England

Coordinates: 53.861880°N 1.099210°W

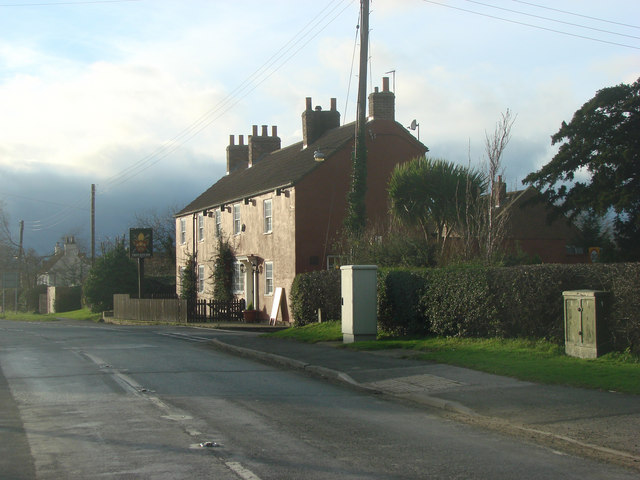
- The Cross Keys pub in Stillingfleet

- Location within North Yorkshire
- Population: 405 (2011 census)
- OS grid reference: SE593410
- Unitary authority: North Yorkshire
- Ceremonial county: North Yorkshire
- Region: Yorkshire and the Humber
- Country: England
- Sovereign state: United Kingdom
- Post town: YORK
- Postcode district: YO19
- Police: North Yorkshire
- Fire: North Yorkshire
- Ambulance: Yorkshire

Stillingfleet is a village and civil parish in North Yorkshire, England. It is about 6 miles (10 km) south of York and nearby settlements include Acaster Selby, Naburn and Appleton Roebuck. In 2011 the parish had a population of 405.

Stillingfleet was once the site of UK Coal's Stillingfleet Mine, part of the Selby Coalfield, which closed in 2004.

St Helen's Church, the parish church, is a grade I listed building. Another notable building is Moreby Hall, which is grade II* listed.

The village was in the historic East Riding of Yorkshire until 1974. From 1974 to 2023 it was part of the Selby District. It is now administered by the unitary North Yorkshire Council.

== Toponymy ==
The origin of the name 'Stillingfleet' lies in Old English. The name means 'stretch of river belonging to the family or followers of a man called Styfel', and is composed of the elements Styfel (the name of the landowner), inga (followers of) and fleot (stream, inlet or creek). The village was recorded as Steflingefled in the Domesday Book of 1086.

== 1833 drowning ==
On Boxing Day 1833, 11 members of a party of carol singers from Stillingfleet were drowned when their boat overturned in the nearby River Ouse.

== See also ==
- Listed buildings in Stillingfleet
