= The Old Windmill, Appleton Roebuck =

Windmill in Appleton Roebuck, North Yorkshire, England

Coordinates: 53°52′32″N 1°10′33″W

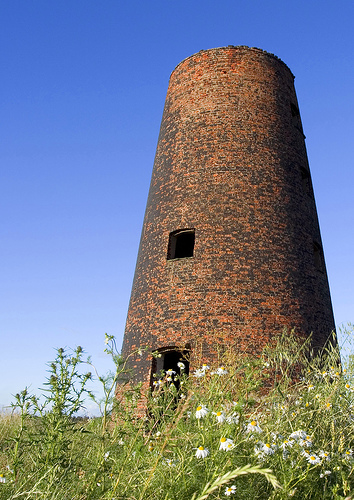
The windmill in 2007, prior to restoration

The Old Windmill is a disused windmill in Appleton Roebuck, a village south-west of York in England.

The four-storey tower windmill was constructed in about 1820, to grind corn. It is built of brick and is circular, tapering as it rises. It has two arched entrances, with multiple arched windows above. The mill's sails were dismantled in the 1930s, and its machinery was removed during World War II. The mill fell into ruin, losing its roof and many internal features. Despite this, it was Grade II listed in 1987.

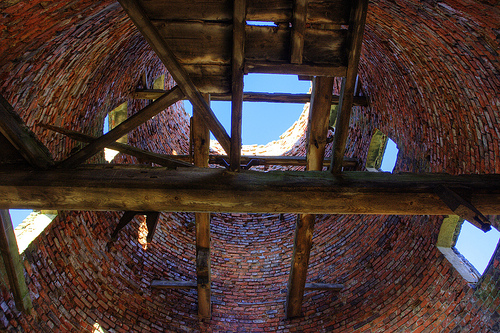
Looking up inside the windmill, prior to restoration

The mill was purchased by the Houseman family in 1964, along with the surrounding land. In 2018, the family sold the mill for £200,000, having obtained outline planning permission for its conversion into a house. Ian Hazard designed the conversion, which includes three single-storey outbuildings, providing additional living space.

The mill is visible from the East Coast Mainline, and from its top floor, there is a view of York Minster.

== See also ==
- Listed buildings in Appleton Roebuck
