= St Helen's Church, Stillingfleet =

Church in North Yorkshire, England

Coordinates: 53.8619°N 1.0994°W

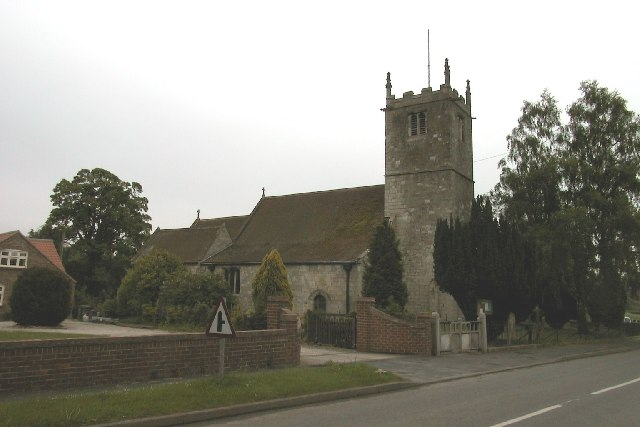
The church, in 2005

St Helen's Church is the parish church of Stillingfleet, in North Yorkshire, in England.

== History ==
The church was originally built in about 1145, from which time the nave, chancel and south porch survive. It is likely that this was the entirety of the church at the time; the Victoria County History states that "for its size it was notably well decorated". In the 13th century, a north aisle and chapel dedicated to Saint Anne were added. The lowest stage of the tower also dates from this time.

In 1336, the Moreby Chapel was added, and new windows were added to the chancel. In the 15th and 16th centuries, the upper parts of the tower were rebuilt, the chancel arch removed, the north aisle was heightened. Some of this work dates from about 1520, when bequests totalling £50 were made. However, by 1567, the chancel was in poor condition. Some work may have been done in the late 17th century, and the nave roof was rebuilt in 1828. Between 1875 and 1884, the church was restored by C. Hodgson Fowler, the east end was rebuilt, a gallery was added, and new pews were installed. In 1966, the church was Grade I listed.

== Architecture ==
=== Door ===
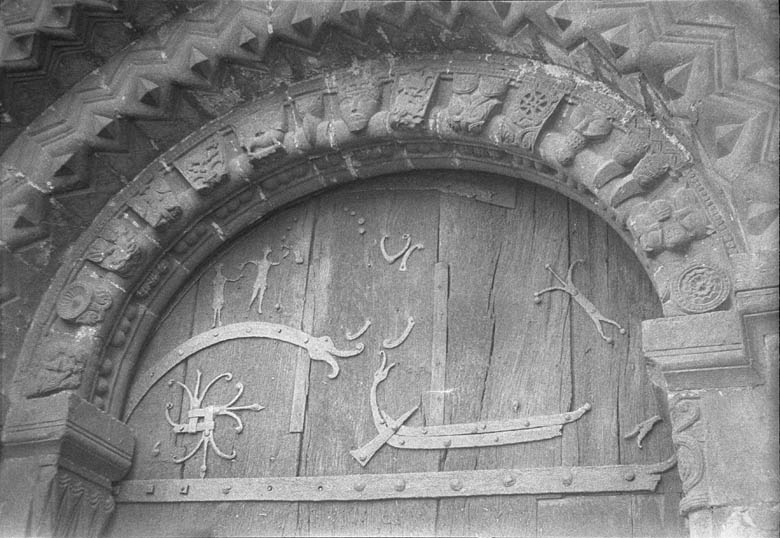
The upper part of the door, seen in 1929

The most noted feature of the church is its door, which is at least as old as the church, but generally thought to date from the 10th century, and to have been moved to the church when it was built. Its ironwork includes the hinges, a cross, a ship, two figures, a tree, a horned figure, and a further figure on its own. In 1990, the door was taken to London, where it was restored by Plowden & Smith. In 2002, it was returned to Stillingfleet, and rehung inside the church, with a new door constructed, with ironwork recalling that of the Saxon door.

=== Structure ===
The church is built of Magnesian limestone. It has a three-bay nave and a two-bay chancel, with the tower at the west end. The tower has a single lancet window on the west side, and a mullioned window on the south. The top of the tower has battlements.

On the south side is the main doorway, contemporary with the church, but moved in the 13th century, when St Anne's Chapel was added. The doorway has five orders of decoration. On the north side is the priest's doorway, which also has decorative mouldings and a plank door with decorative hinges.

=== Interior ===
Inside the church, there is an effigy of a knight, dating from about 1337, and dedicated to Robert of Moreby. There is an alabaster monument to John Acklam, carved in 1613. One window in the chancel has glass dating from 1520 and restored in 1698, depicting the arms of Stillington impaling Bigod. Two chancel screens in the Moreby Chapel are said to have been made in 1877, from 17th-century woodwork. The Chapel of St Anne has panelling dating from about 1650. There are also an organ and three bells, two dating from 1626, and one from 1747.

== See also ==
- Grade I listed buildings in North Yorkshire (district)
- Listed buildings in Stillingfleet
