= The Mower's Song =

Poem by Andrew Marvell

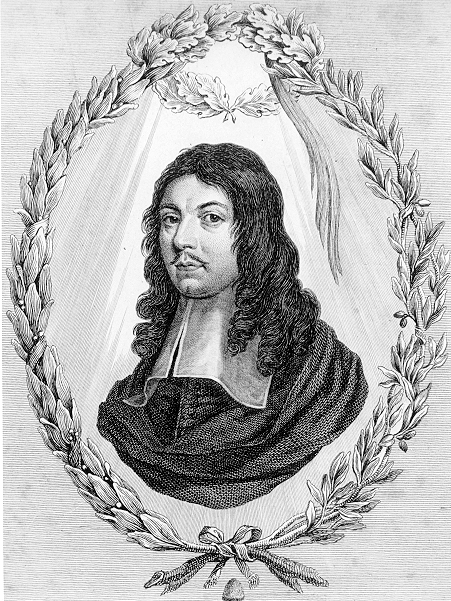
Andrew Marvell's "The Mower's Song" was published posthumously.

"The Mower's Song" is a pastoral poem by English poet Andrew Marvell, published posthumously in 1681. The work is the last of a series of four poems by Marvell known as the Mower poems. Though the mower in this poem is not named, scholars have stated that all the Mower poems are in the voice of Damon the Mower.

== Subject and themes ==
In the poem, a man who works as a mower sings about his lover Juliana. He compares her cruelty with his own cruelty to the grass he cuts.
