= Acaster Selby =

Village and civil parish in North Yorkshire, England

Coordinates: 53°51′55″N 1°07′43″W

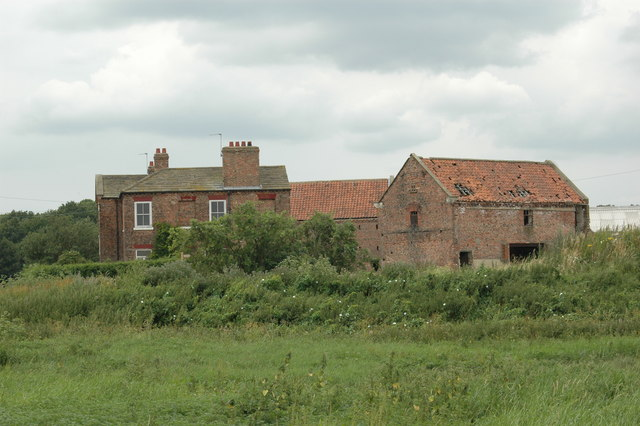
- College Farm, Acaster Selby

- Location within North Yorkshire
- Population: 56 (2001)
- OS grid reference: SE573414
  - London: 165 mi (266 km) S
- Unitary authority: North Yorkshire
- Ceremonial county: North Yorkshire
- Region: Yorkshire and the Humber
- Country: England
- Sovereign state: United Kingdom
- Post town: YORK
- Postcode district: YO23
- Police: North Yorkshire
- Fire: North Yorkshire
- Ambulance: Yorkshire
- UK Parliament: Wetherby and Easingwold

Acaster Selby is a village in the county of North Yorkshire, England. It is part of the joint civil parish with Appleton Roebuck (where the population is now included). It is situated about 6 miles (9.7 km) south from York, on the west back of the River Ouse; near the opposite bank is the settlement of Stillingfleet, and 1.3 miles (2.1 km) to the north-west is Appleton Roebuck.

== History ==
The name is derived from the Latin word for a camp, castra, indicating that the Roman army may once have been based near here. There is no longer any signs of such an encampment which was thought to have provided protection of the waterway to Tadcaster. A- likely comes from either Old English ā or Old Norse á, both meaning 'river'. The use of Selby indicates that the lands were brought within the control of Selby Abbey. This was done by Osbert de Arches at the time of the Norman Conquest and confirmed in the reign of Richard I.

The village is listed in the Domesday Book of 1086 as Acastre in the wapentake of Ainsty in the West Riding of Yorkshire, having 11 households under the lordship of Wulstan, who was replaced by Robert Malet in 1086. From 1974 to 2023 it was part of the Selby District. It is now administered by the unitary North Yorkshire Council.

College Farm at Acaster Selby is named after a former college, or a chantry, which was dissolved during the reign of Henry VIII. The site of the St Andrew's College, 1,440 feet (440 m) to the north-east of the farm, is a scheduled monument and includes extensive earthworks of buildings and a moated enclosure.

== Geography ==
The village has an area of 1,523 acres (6.2 km^{2}). It lies 1.3 miles (2.1 km) south-east of Appleton Roebuck.

== Demography ==
According to the 1881 census the population was 115. The 2001 census showed a population of 56 in 20 households.

== Governance ==
The Parish is part of joint parish with Appleton Roebuck and has one seat on its council. It is part of the Wetherby and Easingwold UK Parliament constituency. It is part of the Appleton Roebuck and Church Fenton electoral division of North Yorkshire Council.

== Religion ==
St John's Church, Acaster Selby dates from 1850. It lies to the south of the village just off Back Lane. It is a Grade II Listed Building.

== See also ==
- Listed buildings in Acaster Selby

== Gallery ==
Views of Acaster Selby
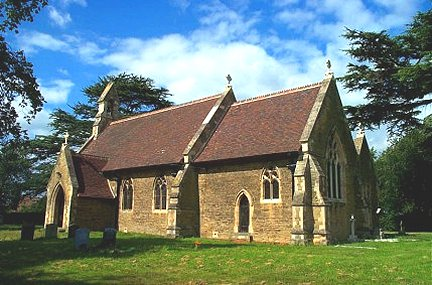
St John The Evangelist Church, Acaster Selby

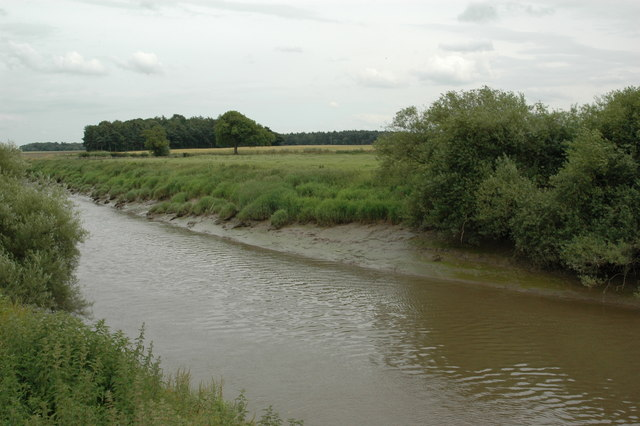
River Ouse, Acaster Selby
