= To His Coy Mistress =

1681 poem by Andrew Marvell

To His Coy Mistress

Had we but World enough, and Time,
This coyness, Lady, were no crime.
We would sit down, and think which way
To walk, and pass our long Loves Day.
Thou by the Indian Ganges side
Should'st Rubies find: I by the Tide
Of Humber would complain. I would
Love you ten years before the Flood:
And you should if you please refuse
Till the Conversion of the Jews.
My vegetable Love should grow
Vaster than Empires, and more slow.
A hundred years should go to praise
Thine Eyes, and on thy Forehead Gaze.
Two hundred to adore each breast:
But thirty thousand to the rest.
An Age at least to every part,
And the last Age should show your Heart.
For Lady you deserve this State;
Nor would I love at lower rate.
But at my back I always hear
Time's wingèd chariot hurrying near:
And yonder all before us lie
Deserts of vast Eternity.
Thy Beauty shall no more be found,
Nor, in thy marble Vault, shall sound
My echoing Song: then Worms shall try
That long preserv'd Virginity:
And your quaint Honour turn to dust;
And into ashes all my Lust.
The Grave's a fine and private place,
But none I think do there embrace.
Now therefore, while the youthful hue
Sits on thy skin like morning dew,
And while thy willing Soul transpires
At every pore with instant Fires,
Now let us sport us while we may;
And now, like am'rous birds of prey,
Rather at once our Time devour,
Than languish in his slow-chapt pow'r.
Let us roll all our Strength, and all
Our sweetness, up into one Ball:
And tear our Pleasures with rough strife,
Through the Iron gates of Life.
Thus, though we cannot make our Sun
Stand still, yet we will make him run.

"To His Coy Mistress" is a metaphysical poem written by the English author Andrew Marvell (1621–1678). It is considered one of Marvell's finest and is possibly the best recognised carpe diem poem in English.

It was written during or just before the English Interregnum (1649–1660)—perhaps in the early 1650s when Marvell was serving as a tutor to the daughter of the retired commander of the New Model Army, Sir Thomas Fairfax—and published posthumously in 1681.

== Synopsis ==
The speaker of the poem starts by addressing a woman who has been slow to respond to his romantic advances. In the first stanza he describes how he would pay court to her if he were to be unencumbered by the constraints of a normal lifespan. He could spend centuries admiring each part of her body, and her resistance to his advances (i.e., coyness) would not discourage him. In the second stanza, he laments how short human life is. Once life is over, the speaker contends, the opportunity to enjoy one another is gone, as no one embraces in death. In the last stanza, the speaker urges the woman to requite his efforts, and argues that in loving one another with passion they will both make the most of the brief time they have to live.

== Critical reception and themes ==
"To His Coy Mistress" has been seen by many as a poem that follows the traditional conventions of carpe diem love poetry. Some modern critics, however, argue Marvell's use of complex and ambiguous metaphors challenges the perceived notions of the poem. It as well raises suspicion of irony and deludes the reader with its inappropriate and jarring imagery.

Some critics believe the poem is an ironic statement on sexual seduction. They reject the idea that Marvell's poem carries a serious and solemn mood. Rather, the poem's opening lines—"Had we but world enough, and time/ This coyness, Lady, were no crime"—seems to suggest quite a whimsical tone of regret. In the second part of the poem, there is a sudden transition into imagery that involves graves, marble vaults and worms. The narrator's use of such metaphors to depict a realistic and harsh death that awaits the lovers seems to be a way of shocking the lady into submission. Critics have also noted the narrator's sense of urgency in the poem's third section, especially the alarming comparison of the lovers to "amorous birds of prey".

== Allusions in other works ==
At least two poets have taken up the challenge of responding to Marvell's poem in the character of the lady so addressed. Annie Finch's "Coy Mistress" suggests that poetry is a more fitting use of their time than lovemaking, while A.D. Hope's "His Coy Mistress to Mr. Marvell" turns down the offered seduction outright.

Many authors have borrowed the phrase "World enough and time" from the poem's opening line to use in their book titles. One is Robert Penn Warren's 1950 novel World Enough and Time: A Romantic Novel, about murder in early-19th-century Kentucky. With variations, it has also been used for books on the philosophy of physics (World Enough and Space-Time: Absolute versus Relational Theories of Space and Time), geopolitics (World Enough and Time: Successful Strategies for Resource Management), a science-fiction collection (Worlds Enough & Time: Five Tales of Speculative Fiction), and a biography of the poet (World Enough and Time: The Life of Andrew Marvell). The verse serves as an epigraph to Mimesis, literary critic Erich Auerbach's most famous book. It is also the title of an episode of Big Finish Productions's The Diary of River Song series 2, and of part 1 of Doctor Who's Series 10 finale. It is the title of a Star Trek New Voyages fan episode where George Takei reprises his role as Sulu after being lost in a rift in time. The title of Robert A. Heinlein's 1973 novel Time Enough for Love also echoes this line.

Also in the field of science fiction, Ursula K. Le Guin wrote a Hugo-nominated short story whose title, "Vaster than Empires and More Slow", is taken from the poem. Ian Watson notes the debt of this story to Marvell, "whose complex and allusive poems are of a later form of pastoral to that which I shall refer, and, like Marvell, Le Guin's nature references are, as I want to argue, "pastoral" in a much more fundamental and interesting way than this simplistic use of the term." There are other allusions to the poem in the fields of fantasy and Science fiction: the first book of James Kahn's New World Series is titled World Enough, and Time; the third book of Joe Haldeman's Worlds trilogy is titled Worlds Enough and Time; and Peter S. Beagle's novel A Fine and Private Place about a love affair between two ghosts in a graveyard. The latter phrase has been widely used as a euphemism for the grave, and has formed the title of several mystery novels.

Brian Aldiss's novel Hothouse, set in a distant future in which the earth is dominated by plant life, opens with "My vegetable love should grow / vaster than empires, and more slow."

Terry Pratchett opens his poem An Ode to Multiple Universes with "I do have worlds enough and time / to spare an hour to find a rhyme / to take a week to pen an article / a day to find a rhyme for ‘particle’."

The phrase "there will be time" occurs repeatedly in a section of T. S. Eliot's "The Love Song of J. Alfred Prufrock" (1915), and is often said to be an allusion to Marvell's poem. Eliot also alludes to the poem in line 196 of “The Waste Land”: “But at my back from time to time I hear…”

The line "deserts of vast eternity" is used in the novel Orlando: A Biography (1928), by Virginia Woolf.

Archibald MacLeish's poem "You, Andrew Marvell", alludes to the passage of time and to the growth and decline of empires.

B. F. Skinner quotes "But at my back I always hear / Time's wingèd chariot hurrying near", through his character Professor Burris in Walden Two, who is in a confused mood of desperation, lack of orientation, irresolution and indecision. (Prentice Hall 1976, Chapter 31, p. 266). This line is also quoted in Ernest Hemingway's novel A Farewell to Arms, as in Arthur C. Clarke's short story, "The Ultimate Melody".

The same line appears in full in the opening minutes of Michael Powell and Emeric Pressburger's A Matter of Life and Death (1946), spoken by the protagonist, pilot and poet Peter Carter: 'But at my back I always hear / Time's wingéd chariot hurrying near; And yonder all before us lie / Deserts of vast eternity. Andy Marvell, What a marvel'.

Primo Levi roughly quotes Marvell in his 1983 poem "The Mouse," which describes the artistic and existential pressures of the awareness that time is finite. He expresses annoyance at the sentiment to seize the day, stating, "And at my back it seems to hear / Some winged curved chariot hurrying near. / What impudence! What conceit! / I really was fed up."

World and Time Enough is a 1994 independent gay-themed romantic comedy-drama written and directed by Eric Mueller.

== See also ==
- To the Virgins, to Make Much of Time, a 1648 poem by Robert Herrick on the same subject
