= On Mr. Milton's Paradise Lost =

Poem by Andrew Marvell

"On Mr Milton's Paradise Lost" is a poem written by the 17th century English poet Andrew Marvell. The poem is an ode praising John Milton's epic poem Paradise Lost (1667). The poem was first published in the second edition of Paradise Lost, in 1674.
