= Andrew Marvell =

English poet and politician (1621–1678)

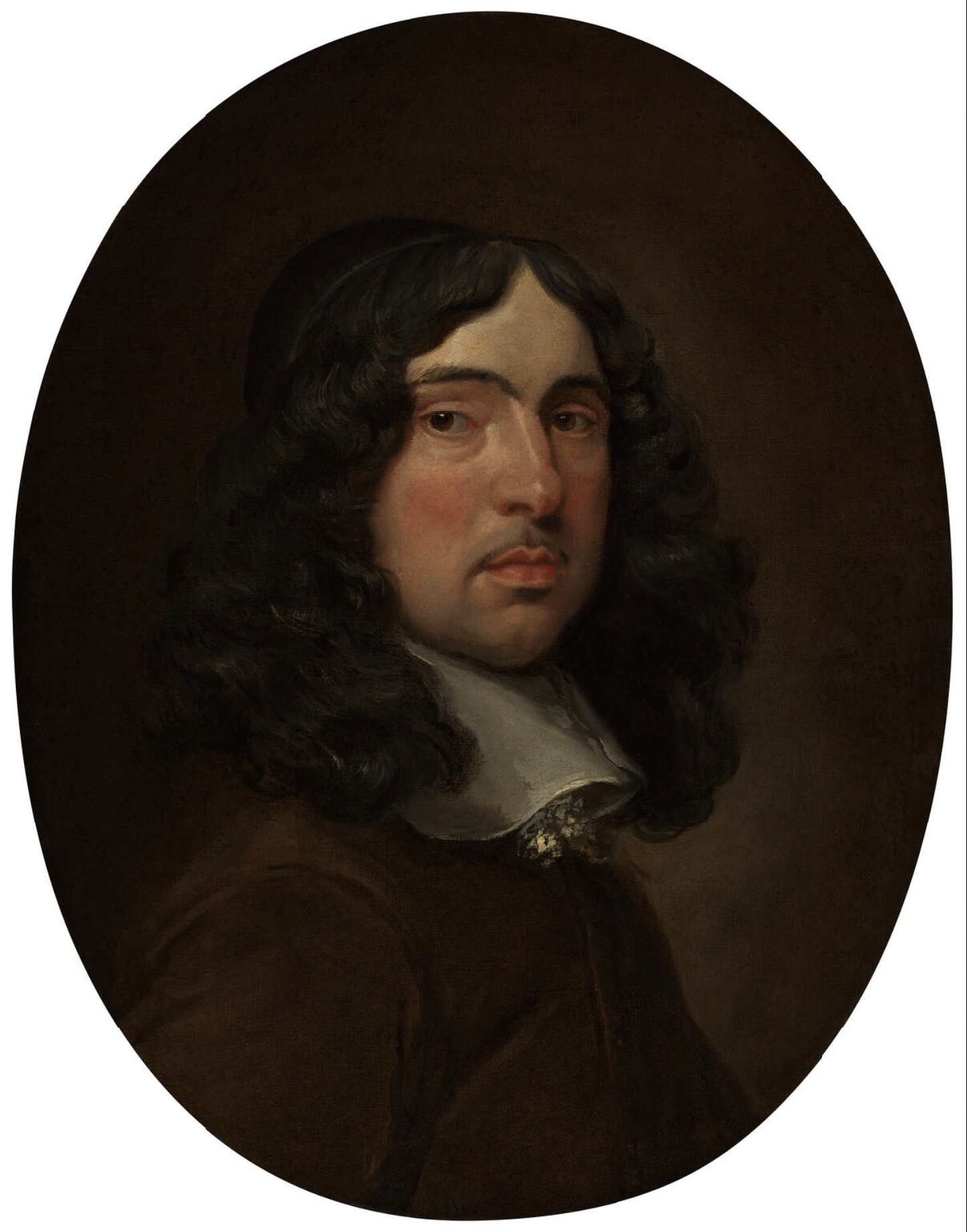
- c. 1655–1660 portrait
- Born: 31 March 1621; Winestead, England
- Died: 16 August 1678 (aged 57); London, England
- Education: Trinity College, Cambridge
- Occupation: Poet
- Writing career
- Notable works: "To His Coy Mistress", "The Mower's Song", "The Garden", "Upon Appleton House", "On Mr. Milton's Paradise Lost"

Andrew Marvell (/ˈmɑːrvəl, mɑːrˈvɛl/; 31 March 1621 – 16 August 1678) was an English poet, satirist and politician who sat in the House of Commons at various times between 1659 and 1678. During the Commonwealth period he was a colleague and friend of John Milton. A metaphysical poet, his poems range from the love-song "To His Coy Mistress", to evocations of an aristocratic country house and garden in "Upon Appleton House" and "The Garden", the political address "An Horatian Ode upon Cromwell's Return from Ireland", and the later personal and political satires "Flecknoe" and "The Character of Holland".

== Early life ==
Marvell was born in Winestead, East Riding of Yorkshire on 31 March 1621. He was the son of a Church of England clergyman also named Andrew Marvell. The family moved to Hull when his father was appointed Lecturer at Holy Trinity Church, and Marvell was educated at Hull Grammar School. Aged 13, Marvell attended Trinity College, Cambridge and eventually received a BA degree. A portrait of Marvell, attributed to Godfrey Kneller, hangs in Trinity College's collection.

From the middle of 1642 onwards, Marvell probably travelled in continental Europe. He may well have served as a tutor for an aristocrat on the Grand Tour, but the facts are not clear on this point. While England was embroiled in the civil war, Marvell seems to have remained on the continent until 1647. During his visit to Rome in 1645, he probably met the Villiers brothers, Lord Francis and the 2nd Duke of Buckingham, as well as Richard Flecknoe. He later wrote a satirical poem about Flecknoe. His travel route is unclear, except that Milton later reported that Marvell had mastered four languages, including French, Italian and Spanish.

== First poems and Marvell's time at Nun Appleton ==
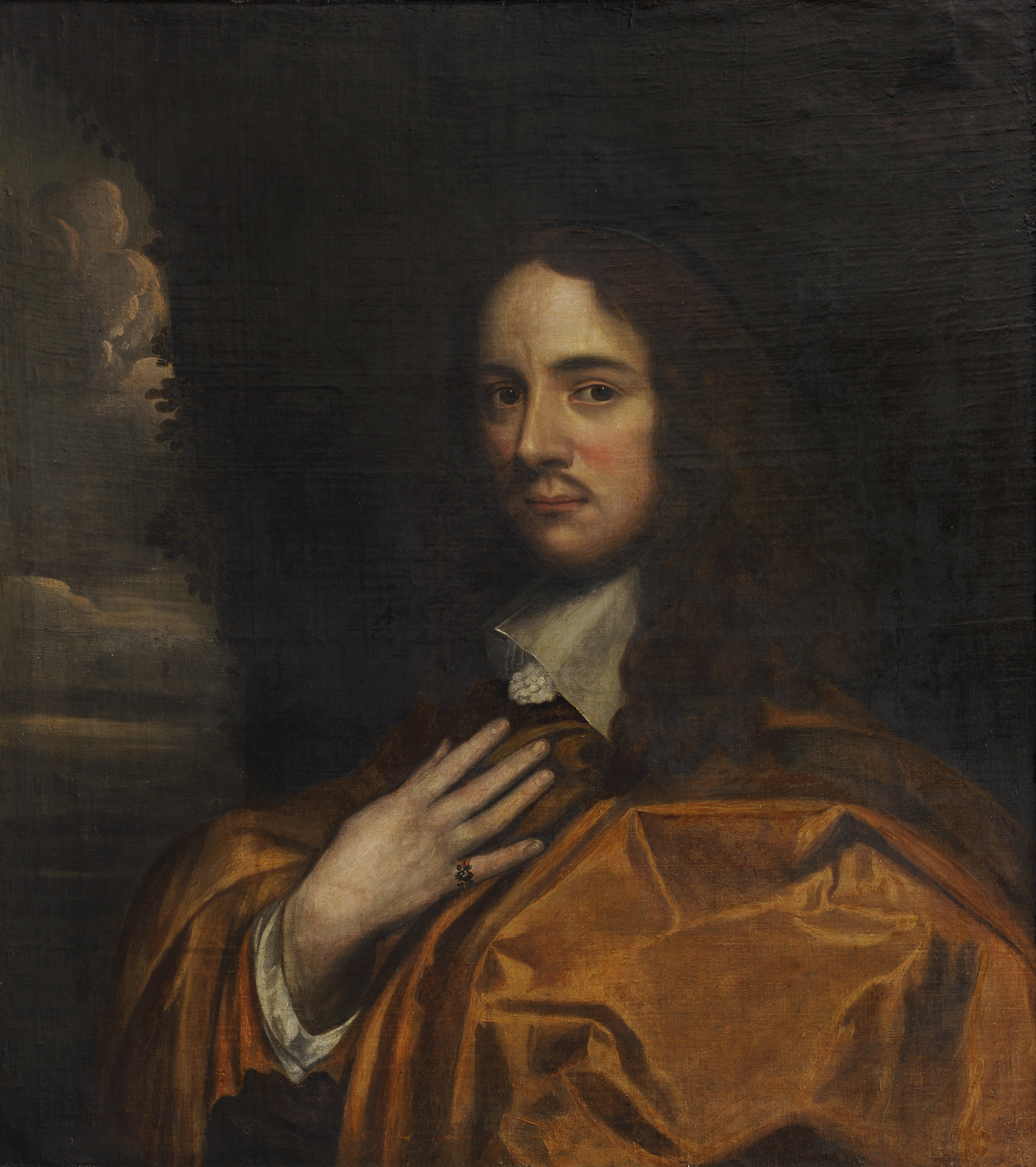
Portrait attributed to Sir Godfrey Kneller, Trinity College, Cambridge

Marvell's first poems, which were written in Latin and Greek and published when he was still at Cambridge, lamented a visitation of the plague and celebrated the birth of a child to King Charles I and Queen Henrietta Maria. He belatedly became sympathetic to the successive regimes during the Interregnum after Charles I's execution on 30 January 1649. His "Horatian Ode", a political poem dated to 1650, responds with sadness to the regicide, despite the overall praise towards Oliver Cromwell's return from Ireland.

Circa 1650–52, Marvell served as tutor to the daughter, Mary, of Lord General Fairfax, who had recently relinquished command of the Parliamentary army to Cromwell. During this period, Marvell lived at Nun Appleton Hall, near York, where he continued to write poetry. One of his works, "Upon Appleton House, To My Lord Fairfax", uses a description of the estate as a way of exploring Fairfax's and Marvell's own social situation in a time of war and political change. Probably the best-known poem Marvell wrote at this time is "To His Coy Mistress".

== Anglo-Dutch War and employment as Latin secretary ==
During the period of increasing tensions leading up to the First Anglo-Dutch War of 1652, Marvell wrote the satirical "Character of Holland". It repeated the contemporary stereotype of the Dutch as "drunken and profane": "This indigested vomit of the Sea,/ Fell to the Dutch by Just Propriety."

He became a tutor to Cromwell's ward, William Dutton, in 1653, and moved to live with his pupil at John Oxenbridge's house in Eton. Oxenbridge previously made two trips to Bermuda, this most-likely inspired Marvell to write his poem Bermudas. He also wrote several poems praising Cromwell, who was Lord Protector of England at that point. In 1656 Marvell and Dutton travelled to France, to visit the Protestant Academy of Saumur.

In 1657, Marvell joined Milton (who was now blind) in service as Latin secretary to Cromwell's Council of State at a salary of £200 a year. This was enough for decent financial security. Oliver Cromwell died in 1658 and was succeeded as Lord Protector by his son Richard. In 1659 Marvell was elected Member of Parliament for Kingston upon Hull in the Third Protectorate Parliament. He was paid a rate of 6 shillings, 8 pence per day during sittings of parliament, a financial support derived from the contributions of his constituency. He was re-elected MP for Hull in 1660 for the Convention Parliament.

== After the Restoration ==
The monarchy was restored in England in 1660 with Charles II as king. Marvell avoided punishment for his own co-operation with Cromwell and republicanism more broadly. Furthermore, he helped to convince the King not to execute John Milton for his anti-monarchical writings and revolutionary activities. The closeness of the relationship between the two former colleagues is indicated by the fact that Marvell contributed an eloquent prefatory poem, entitled "On Mr. Milton's Paradise Lost", to the second edition of Milton's epic Paradise Lost. According to a biographer: "Skilled in the arts of self-preservation, he was not a toady."

In 1661 Marvell was re-elected MP for Hull in the Cavalier Parliament. He eventually came to write several long and bitterly satirical verses against the corruption of the court. This work was mostly circulated in less public manuscript form, however some was anonymously published in print. The verses were too politically sensitive and too dangerous to be published under his name until well after the writer's death. Marvell took up opposition to the 'court party', and satirised them as his main target. In his longest verse of satire, Last Instructions to a Painter, written in 1667, Marvell responded to the political corruption that had contributed to English failures during the Second Anglo-Dutch War and lampooned Henry Jermyn, 1st Earl of St Albans. The poem was only published in print after the Revolution of 1688–9. The poem instructs an imaginary painter on how to portray the state without a proper navy to defend them. The state is led by men without intelligence or courage, a corrupt and dissolute court, and dishonest officials. Of another such satire, Samuel Pepys, himself a government official, commented in his diary, "Here I met with a fourth Advice to a Painter upon the coming in of the Dutch and the End of the War, that made my heart ake to read, it being too sharp and so true."

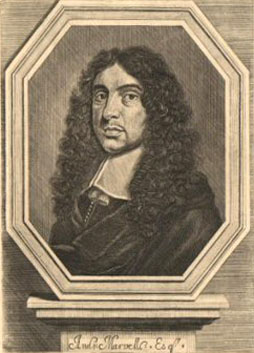
Engraving of Marvell

From 1659 until his death in 1678, Marvell served as London agent for the Hull Trinity House shipmasters' guild. He went on two missions to the continent; one to the Dutch Republic, and the other encompassing Russia, Sweden, and Denmark. He spent some time living in a cottage on Highgate Hill in north London. His stay there is now recorded by a bronze plaque that bears the following inscription:

Four feet below this spot is the stone step, formerly the entrance to the cottage in which lived Andrew Marvell, poet, wit, and satirist; colleague with John Milton in the foreign or Latin secretaryship during the Commonwealth; and for about twenty years M.P. for Hull. Born at Winestead, Yorkshire, 31st March, 1621, died in London, 18th August, 1678, and buried in the church of St. Giles-in-the-Fields. This memorial is placed here by the London County Council, December, 1898.

A floral sundial in the nearby Lauderdale House bears an inscription quoting lines from his poem "The Garden". Andrew Marvell died suddenly in 1678, while attending a popular meeting of his old constituents at Hull. His health had been remarkably good; and some people theorised of his poisoning by his political or clerical enemies. This is unproven. Marvell was buried in the church of St Giles in the Fields in central London. His monument, erected by a very grateful constituency, bears the following inscription:

Near this place lyeth the body of Andrew Marvell, Esq., a man so endowed by Nature, so improved by Education, Study, and Travel, so consummated by Experience, that, joining the peculiar graces of Wit and Learning, with a singular penetration and strength of judgment; and exercising all these in the whole course of his life, with an unutterable steadiness in the ways of Virtue, he became the ornament and example of his age, beloved by good men, feared by bad, admired by all, though imitated by few; and scarce paralleled by any. But a Tombstone can neither contain his character, nor is Marble necessary to transmit it to posterity; it is engraved in the minds of this generation, and will be always legible in his inimitable writings, nevertheless. He having served twenty years successfully in Parliament, and that with such Wisdom, Dexterity, and Courage, as becomes a true Patriot, the town of Kingston-upon-Hull, from whence he was deputed to that Assembly, lamenting in his death the public loss, have erected this Monument of their Grief and their Gratitude, 1688.

== Prose ==
Marvell also wrote anonymous prose satires: criticizing the monarchy and Roman Catholicism, defending Puritan dissenters, and denouncing censorship.

The Rehearsal Transpros'd, an attack on Samuel Parker, was published in two parts in 1672 and 1673.

Mr. Smirke; or The Divine in Mode, (1676) criticised Church of England intolerance, and was published together with a "Short Historical Essay, concerning General Councils, Creeds, and Impositions, in matters of Religion."

Marvell's pamphlet An Account of the Growth of Popery and Arbitrary Government in England, published in late 1677, alleged that: "There has now for diverse Years, a design been carried on, to change the Lawfull Government of England into an Absolute Tyranny, and to convert the established Protestant Religion into down-right Popery". John Kenyon described it as "one of the most influential pamphlets of the decade" and G. M. Trevelyan called it: "A fine pamphlet, which throws light on causes provocative of the formation of the Whig party".

A 1678 work published anonymously ("by a Protestant") in defense of John Howe against the attack of his fellow-dissenter, the severe Calvinist Thomas Danson, is also probably by Marvell. Its full title is Remarks upon a late disingenuous discourse, writ by one T.D. under the pretence de causa Dei, and of answering Mr. John Howe's letter and postscript of God's prescience, &c., affirming, as the Protestant doctrine, that God doth by efficacious influence universally move and determine men to all their actions, even to those that are most wicked.

== Views ==
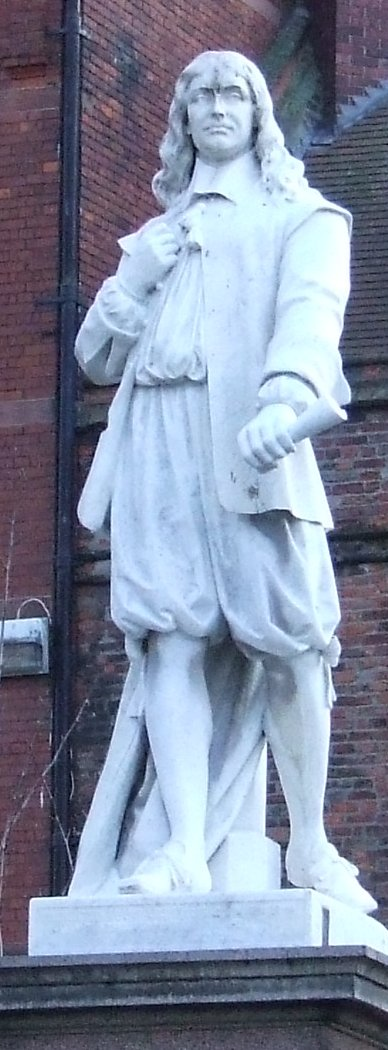
A statue of Andrew Marvell, located in the Marketplace, Kingston upon Hull, England

Although Marvell became a Parliamentarian and was opposed to episcopacy, he was not a Puritan. Later in life especially, he seems to have been a conforming Anglican. Marvell positively identifies himself as "a Protestant" in pamphlets. He had flirted briefly with Catholicism as a youth, and was described in his thirties (on the Saumur visit) as "a notable English Italo-Machiavellian".

His strong Biblical influence is clear in poems such as "The Garden", the "Coronet" and "The Bermudas".

Vincent Palmieri noted that Marvell is sometimes known as the "British Aristides" for his incorruptible integrity in life and poverty at death. Many of his poems were not published until 1681, three years after his death, from a collection owned by Mary Palmer, his housekeeper. After Marvell's death she laid dubious claim to having been his wife, from the time of a secret marriage in 1667.

== Marvell's poetic style ==
Marvell is said to have adhered to the established stylized forms of his contemporary neoclassical tradition. These include the carpe diem lyric tradition which also forms the basis of his famous lyric "To His Coy Mistress". He adopted familiar forms and infused them with his unique conceits, analogies, reflections and preoccupations with larger questions about life and death. T.S. Eliot wrote of Marvell's style that "It is more than a technical accomplishment, or the vocabulary and syntax of an epoch; it is, what we have designated tentatively as wit, a tough reasonableness beneath the slight lyric grace". He also identified Marvell and the metaphysical school with the "dissociation of sensibility" that occurred in 17th-century English literature; Eliot described this trend as "something which ... happened to the mind of England...it is the difference between the intellectual poet and the reflective poet". Poets increasingly developed a self-conscious relationship to tradition, which took the form of a new emphasis on craftsmanship of expression and an idiosyncratic freedom in allusions to Classical and Biblical sources.

"To His Coy Mistress", Marvell's most celebrated poem, combines an old poetic conceit (the persuasion of the speaker's lover by means of a carpe diem philosophy) with Marvell's typically vibrant imagery and easy command of rhyming couplets. Other works incorporate topical satire and religious themes.

== Legacy ==
A secondary school in Hull, the Andrew Marvell Business and Enterprise College, is named after him.

== In Popular Fiction ==
The play Appleton House by Australian playwright AS McPhie examines Marvell's time teaching Mary Fairfax, and features many of the lyric poems believed to have been written in this period.

== See also ==
- List of works by Andrew Marvell
- The Marvell College
- Andrew Marvel (1812 ship) – ship built at Kingston upon Hull that made some 24 voyages as a Greenland whaler
