= Country house poem =

Genre of poem

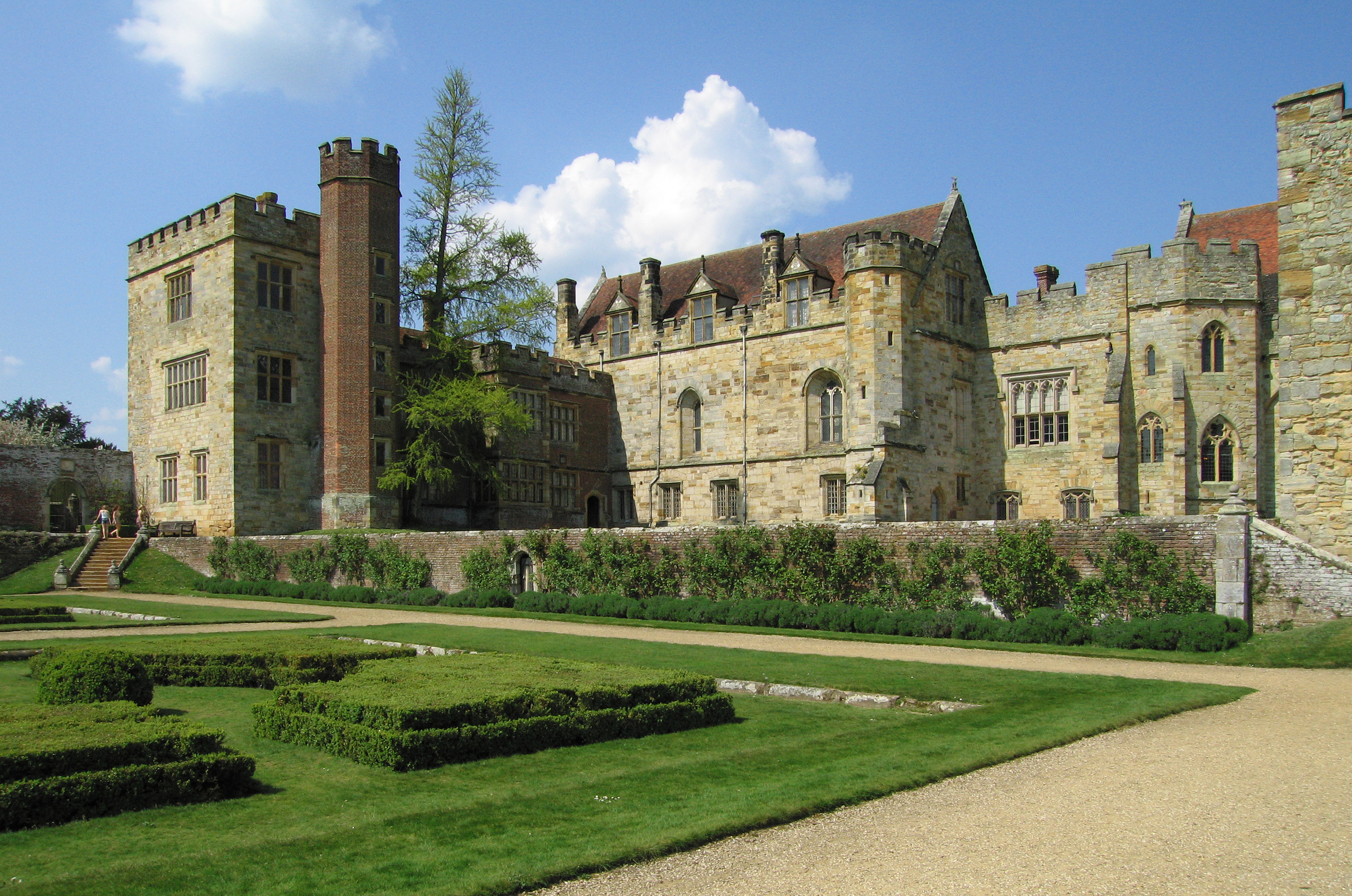
Penshurst Place

A country house poem is a poem in which the author compliments a wealthy patron or a friend through a description of his country house. Such poems were popular in early 17th-century England. The genre may be seen as a sub-set of the topographical poem.

== Examples ==
The model for the country house poem is Ben Jonson's To Penshurst, one of the first in this genre. The speaker contrasts Penshurst Place, a large and important late medieval house which was extended in a similar style under Elizabeth I, with more recent prodigy houses, which he calls "proud, ambitious heaps". The poem has many allusions, to Epiphanius, Martial, and Horace, amongst others, and begins with the following lines referencing Horace's Ode 2:18:

Thou art not, Penshurst, built to envious show
Of touch or marble, nor canst boast a row
Of polished pillars, or a roof of gold;
Thou hast no lantern whereof tales are told,
Or stair, or courts; but stand'st an ancient pile,
And these grudged at, art reverenced the while.

Subsequent country house poems imitated To Penshurst. Aemilia Lanyer's Description of Cookham, however, had in fact been published earlier, in 1611, as a dedicatory verse at the end of her long narrative poem Salve Deus Rex Judaeorum. In the Description of Cookham, Lanyer pays tribute to her patroness Margaret Clifford, Countess of Cumberland, through a description of her residence as a paradise for literary women. The estate at Cookham did not actually belong to Margaret Clifford, but was rented for her by her brother while Clifford was undergoing a dispute with her husband.

"To Richard Cotton, Esq.", composed by Geoffrey Whitney in 1586, which describes Combermere Abbey using the metaphor of a beehive, may be the earliest example.

Other well-known instances of the genre include Andrew Marvell's Upon Appleton House, which describes Thomas, Lord Fairfax's country house, where Marvell was a tutor between November 1650 and the end of 1652. The poem centres on Lord Fairfax's daughter Maria. Marvell wrote another country house poem to Lord Fairfax, the lesser-known Upon the Hill and Grove at Bilborough.

Thomas Carew also wrote two country house poems in the mould of To Penshurst: To Saxham and To My Friend G. N., from Wrest.

Even closer to the Jonsonian model is a poem by the oldest of the so-called "Sons of Ben", Robert Herrick, A Panegyric to Sir Lewis Pemberton.

Examples later than the 17th century are rare, but prominent among them might be W. B. Yeats' "In Seven Woods" (1904), "The Wild Swans at Coole" (1919) and, more importantly, "Coole Park and Ballylee, 1931" (1933). All these praised the estate of Lady Augusta Gregory (1852–1932), at Coole Park, near Gort in the west of Ireland.

== See also ==
- Descriptive poetry

== Bibliography ==
- Jim Casey: "'Equall freedome, equall fare': The Illusion of Egalitarianism in the Country House Poem." Early English Studies. Special issue: "Green Thoughts in the Medieval and Early Modern Worlds" (2010)
- G. R. Hibbard: "The Country House Poem of the Seventeenth Century," Journal of the Warburg and Courtauld Institutes 19 (1956), pp. 159–174
- William McClung: The Country House in English Renaissance Poetry (1977)
- Hugh Jenkins: Feigned Commonwealths, the Country-House Poem and the Fashioning of the Ideal Community (1998, ISBN 0-8207-0292-7)
- Malcolm Kelsall: The Great Good Place: The Country House and English Literature (1993)
- Kari Boyd McBride: Country House Discourse in Early Modern England (2001)
- Don E. Wayne: Penshurst: the Semiotics of Place and the Poetics of History (1984)
- Raymond Williams: The Country and the City (1973)
