= Upon Appleton House =

1651 poem by Andrew Marvell

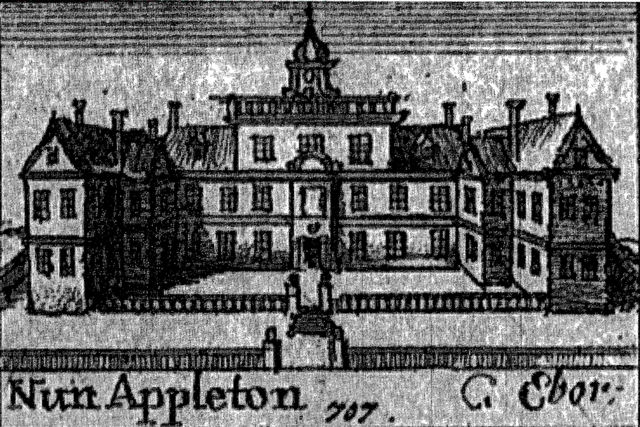
Nun Appleton Priory, 1656

"Upon Appleton House" is a poem written by Andrew Marvell for Thomas Fairfax, 3rd Lord Fairfax of Cameron. It was written in 1651 or 1652, when Marvell was working as a tutor for Fairfax's daughter, Mary. An example of a country house poem, "Upon Appleton House" describes Fairfax's Nunappleton estate while also reflecting upon the political and religious concerns of the time.

== Background ==
Nun Appleton Priory was a Cistercian religious house, until the dissolution of the monasteries. At that point, or shortly afterwards, it was acquired by the Fairfax family. One of the themes of the poem is a Protestant-slanted account of the circumstances under which Isabel Thwaites left the nunnery. She married William Fairfax of Steeton, in 1518, two decades before the Dissolution. Their son Sir Thomas Fairfax of Denton was a member of parliament; and his son was Thomas Fairfax, 1st Lord Fairfax of Cameron. The story of Isabel, released from wardship in the priory by legal order and William Fairfax's intervention, has not been verified independently of Marvell's account.

Thomas Fairfax, the dedicatee of the poem and son of the 2nd Lord Fairfax, went to live as a newly married man with his father at Denton. The domestic arrangements were soon changed, however, and Thomas Fairfax the younger soon moved to Nunappleton (now Nun Appleton), the estate on which Appleton House was built.

Nun Appleton is just north of Ryther, a village south-south-west of York. Local geography enters the poem in the mention of Cawood Castle, within walking distance of Ryther to the east. Both the ruined nunnery and the castle (associated with the Archbishops of York, and in particular with John Williams) are contrasted in the poem with Appleton House.

== Structure ==
The poem is written in 97 stanzas, each of eight lines that are octosyllabic, in iambic tetrameters forming couplets. It has been analysed into six sections:

1. Stanzas 1–10: architecture of the house.
2. Stanzas 11–35: the story of Isabel Thwaites.
3. Stanzas 36–46: the gardens and plants.
4. Stanzas 47–60: the meadows.
5. Stanzas 61–81: the wood.
6. Stanzas 82–97: the river (closing with return to the house).

== Dating ==
"Upon Appleton House" was published posthumously in 1681. It is dated by internal evidence to the early 1650s, but the dates are tentative. Worden says it was probably written in the second half of 1651, or in 1652. Its production was certainly connected to Marvell's period as tutor to Mary Fairfax; this is taken to start after the middle of 1650. Since Marvell was back in London in late 1652, his period of tutor at Appleton House had ended by then.

== Interpretation and influences ==
Marvell was replying to the royalist epic poem Gondibert (1651) by William Davenant. The poem was influenced by works of Mildmay Fane, 2nd Earl of Westmorland and Constantijn Huyghens; it also draws on Antoine Girard de Saint-Amant, a poet whom Fairfax had translated.

There are numerous interpretations, including those of Abraham who sees the poem as a memory map (to regain Paradise), and Stocker, who sees it as an "epic in miniature" and reads closely the later sections for apocalyptic language relating to England as elect nation.
