= Appleton Roebuck =

Village and civil parish in North Yorkshire, England

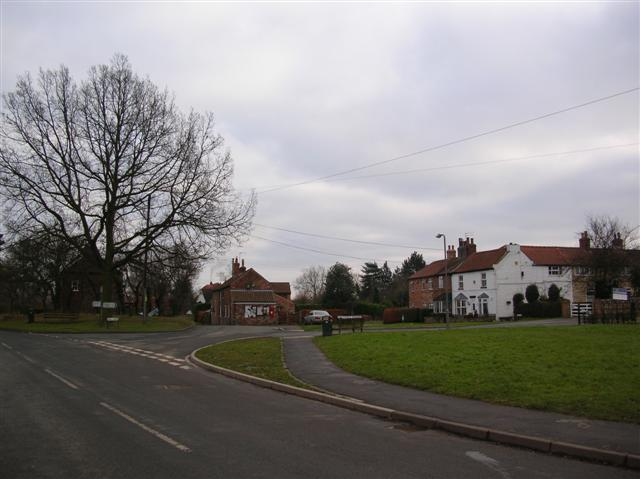
- Appleton Roebuck

- Location within North Yorkshire
- Population: 870 (2021 census)
- OS grid reference: SE 554 422
- Unitary authority: North Yorkshire
- Ceremonial county: North Yorkshire
- Region: Yorkshire and the Humber
- Country: England
- Sovereign state: United Kingdom
- Post town: YORK
- Postcode district: YO23
- Police: North Yorkshire
- Fire: North Yorkshire
- Ambulance: Yorkshire
- UK Parliament: Selby

Appleton Roebuck is a village and civil parish in the county of North Yorkshire, England. The village is about 9 miles (14 km) south-west of York. The civil parish includes the hamlets of Holme Green and Nun Appleton, and covers an area of around 2,900 acres (1,200 ha). The parish had a population of 692 according to the 2001 census, increasing to 870 in the 2021 census and including Acaster Selby.

In February 2000 much of Appleton Roebuck was designated a Conservation Area under Section 69 of the Planning (Listed Buildings and Conservation Areas) Act 1990, and consists of 18th- and 19th-century buildings. There are six listed buildings within the Conservation Area, all Grade II, including two places of worship.

== History ==
Appleton Roebuck derives its name from the Anglo-Saxon meaning a farm where apple trees grew and, from the fourteenth century, when it was owned by a man called Rabuk.

Appleton Roebuck is mentioned in the Domesday Book of 1086, demonstrating that it was already settled before the Norman Conquest of 1066. In the 12th century a nunnery was established at Nun Appleton, a short distance from the village. It was founded by Adeliza, or Alice de St. Quintin, in the reign of King Stephen. After the Dissolution of the Monasteries, the site was acquired by the Fairfax family. A house was built there which later became the home of Thomas, the third Lord Fairfax, a parliamentary commander during the Civil War. After the death of Mary Fairfax, Duchess of Buckingham, Nun Appleton was eventually sold in about 1711 to Alderman Milner of Leeds. The Milner family, who made their money from the Aire and Calder Navigation Canal, continued to own the Hall until 1875, when it was leased to William Beckett Dennison. As the agricultural depression of the 19th century and competition from railways increased, the Milner fortune dwindled away and the estate was sold. The manor and estate originally belonged to the Latimer family, passing, by way of his daughter Elizabeth, to John, Lord Neville of Raby during the reign of Richard II. The estate and manor stayed in the Neville family until 1426.

Woolas Hall, now a farmhouse, was once a more important building, as indicated by the moat by which it was surrounded and may still be traced in the landscape around it.

The Old Windmill is a grade II listed building which was built in about 1820, and operated until the 1930s.

== Governance ==
The village lies within the UK Parliamentary Constituency of Selby. As of the 2024 election, the seat is represented by Keir Mather of the Labour Party, with 43.6% share of the vote.

The village was once part of the parish of Bolton Percy, but is now a civil parish in its own right and includes the nearby village of Acaster Selby. The population of this ward taken at the 2011 Census was 1,865.

From 1974 to 2023 it was part of the Selby District. It is now administered by the unitary North Yorkshire Council.

== Demography ==
In 1822 the population was 585. This rose in 1872 to 622 and according to the census of 1881 was 441.

The 2011 census recorded the population as 792. In the most recent census (2021) the village had a population of 870.

== Economy ==
The village is in a mostly agricultural area, though many residents work in the nearby cities and towns. Within the village are two public houses and various small businesses. Both public houses are Samuel Smith pubs – The Shoulder of Mutton and The Roebuck.

== Geography ==
The village is located in the vale of a rivulet called The Fleet. The East Coast Main Railway Line passes just to the west of the village and the A64 is 2 miles (3 km) to the north-west. The nearest settlements are Colton, 2 miles (3 km) to the north, Bolton Percy, 2 miles (3 km) to the south-west, Acaster Selby, 1.5 miles (2 km) to the south-east and Acaster Malbis, 3.5 miles (6 km) to the north-east.

== Transport ==
York Pullman operate the only public bus service that serves the village, the number 21, as part of the York Piccadilly to Colton route. It subsidised by the City of York council, as well as North Yorkshire Council.

== Education ==
The school was built in 1817 and an infant school was added in 1841. As of 2010, primary education is provided by North Yorkshire Council at Appleton Roebuck Primary School. The school is in the catchment area of Tadcaster Grammar School, a co-educational Comprehensive School, for their secondary education.

== Religious sites ==
The Wesleyans built a Methodist chapel in the village in 1818. All Saints' Church was built in 1868 by J. B. and W. Atkinson.

== Sports ==
The Tennis Club in the village fields one Men's side, two Ladies sides and four mixed sides in the Tyke Petroleum Tennis League.

== Landmarks ==
Nun Appleton Hall (53.8524°N 1.1558°W) was listed as Grade II on 4 July 1952. It stands in an extensive wooded park, near the confluence of the rivers Ouse and Wharfe. The house was built by Thomas, Lord Fairfax, on the site of a Cistercian priory for nuns, founded by Alice de St. Quintin at the commencement of the thirteenth century.

A short distance east from the village are the remains of a moated manor site known as Brocket Hall. Brocket Hall has been cited as being one of the best preserved examples in North Yorkshire and, as such, has been made a scheduled ancient monument. It is included within the Appleton Roebuck Conservation Area.

== See also ==
- Listed buildings in Appleton Roebuck

== Gallery ==
Views of Appleton Roebuck
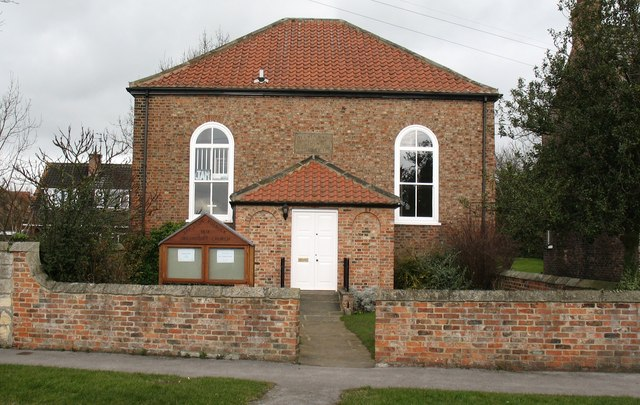
Wesleyan Chapel Appleton Roebuck

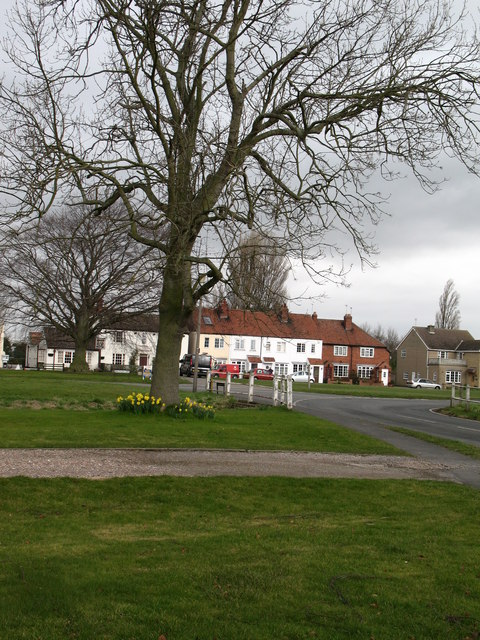
Village Green Appleton Roebuck

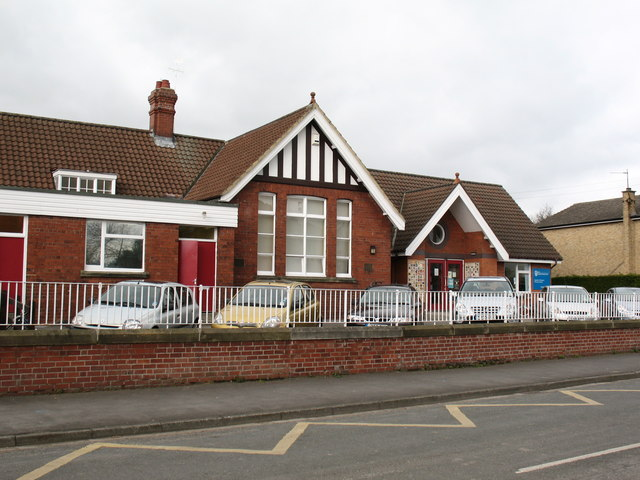
Appleton Roebuck Primary School

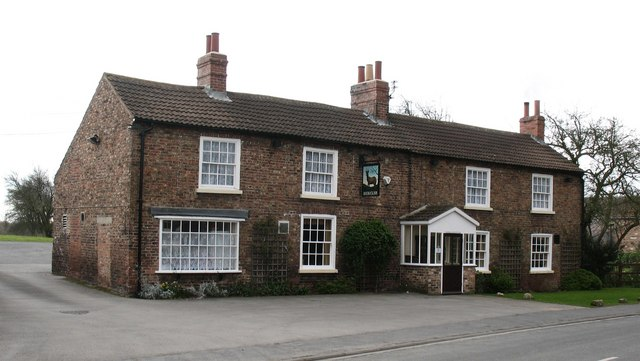
The Roebuck in Appleton Roebuck

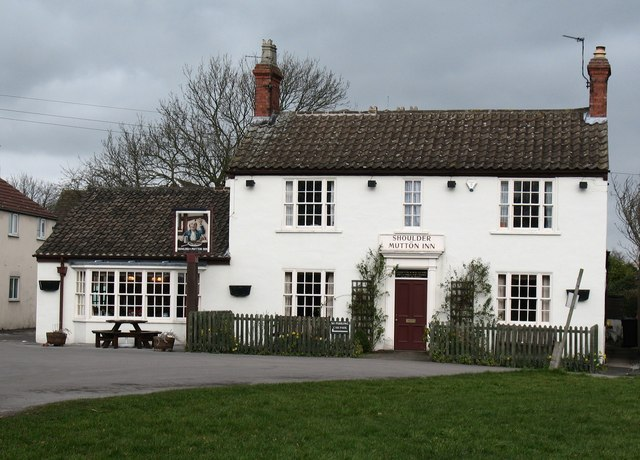
Shoulder of Mutton Appleton Roebuck

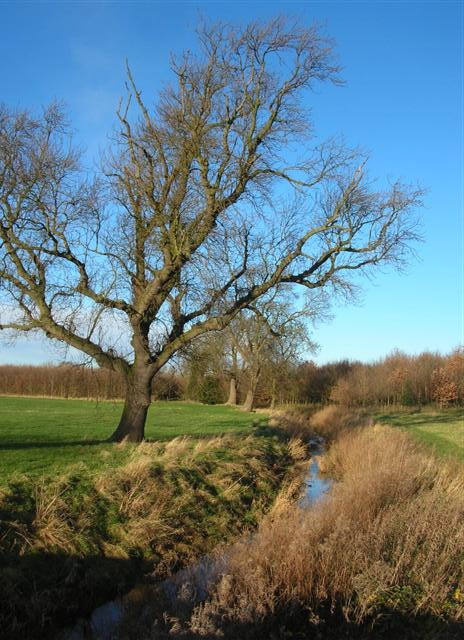
The Fleet river near Appleton Roebuck
