= St Helens =

St Helens or St. Helen's may refer to:

== Places ==
=== Australia ===
- St Helens, Queensland (Fraser Coast Region), a locality in the Fraser Coast Region
- St Helens, Queensland (Toowoomba Region), a locality in the Toowoomba Region
- St Helens Beach, Queensland a locality in the Mackay Region
- St Helens, Tasmania
  - St Helens Island
  - St Helens Important Bird Area
- St Helens, Victoria

=== United Kingdom ===
- St Helens, Merseyside, England
  - St Helens (UK Parliament constituency), a former constituency
  - Metropolitan Borough of St Helens
  - St Helens Central railway station
  - St Helens Junction railway station
- St Helen's, Isles of Scilly, an uninhabited island in the Isles of Scilly, Cornwall
- St Helens, Cumbria, a location in England
- St Helens, Isle of Wight, England, a village
- St Helens, East Sussex, England
- St Helen's (ward), electoral ward in Kensington and Chelsea, London
- St Helen's Church, Bishopsgate, a parish church in Bishopsgate, London, England
- St Helen's (skyscraper), a building in the City of London
- St Helen's, South Yorkshire, a location in England
- St Helen Auckland, also known as St. Helen's Auckland, a village in County Durham
  - Church of St Helen, St Helen Auckland, Anglican church
- St Helens railway station (disambiguation), some of which were in or near St Helens, Merseyside

=== United States ===
- Mount St. Helens, an active stratovolcano in Washington
- Saint Helens, Kentucky
- Shively, Kentucky, formerly known as Saint Helens
- St. Helens, Oregon, city and county seat
- Saint Helens, Washington, unincorporated community

=== Elsewhere ===
- St. Helens, Ontario, Canada
- St. Helen's, Booterstown, Ireland

== Sports ==
- St Helens R.F.C., Merseyside rugby league football club
- St Helens Town A.F.C., Merseyside association football club
- F.C. St Helens, Merseyside association football club
- St Helens & District Football Combination, Merseyside association football league
- St. Helen's Rugby and Cricket Ground, Swansea, Wales

== Other uses ==
- St Helen and St Katharine, an independent school in southern England, also known as St Helen's
- St Helen's School, an independent girls school in Northwood, England
- Baron St Helens, a British peerage title
  - Alleyne FitzHerbert, 1st Baron St Helens
- St. Helens (film), a 1981 film directed by Ernest Pintoff

== See also ==
- Helena (empress), or Saint Helena
- Saint Elen, or Saint Helen
- Saint Helena (disambiguation)
- Sainte-Hélène (disambiguation)
- Santa Helena (disambiguation)
- St. Helen (disambiguation)
