= St Helen's Church =

St Helen's Church or Church of St Helen may refer to the following churches in England:

- St Helen's Church, Abingdon, Oxfordshire
- St Helen's Church, Ainderby Steeple, North Yorkshire
- St Helen's Church, Ashby-de-la-Zouch, Leicestershire
- St Helen's Church, Barmby on the Marsh
- St Helen's Church, Bishopsgate, London
- St Helen's Church, Brant Broughton
- Church of St Helen, Burghwallis, South Yorkshire
- St Helen's Church, Burton Joyce
- St Helen's Church, Churchtown, Lancashire
- St Helen's Church, Darley Dale
- Church of St Helen, Denton, North Yorkshire
- St Helen's Church, Etwall
- St Helen's Church, Grove
- Church of St Helen and St Giles, Havering, London
- St Helen's Church, Hangleton, Brighton and Hove
- St Helen's Church, Ipswich
- Church of St Helen, Kilnsea, East Riding of Yorkshire
- St Helen's Church, Kneeton
- St Helen's Church, Lincoln
- St Helen's Church, Little Cawthorpe Lincolnshire
- St Helen's Church, Lundy
- St Helen Witton Church, Northwich, Cheshire
- St Helen's Church, Norwich
- St Helen's Church, Overton, Lancashire
- St Helen's Church, Oxendon
- Church of St Helen, Ranworth
- St Helen's Church, Santon
- St Helen's Church, Sefton, Merseyside
- St Helen's Church, Selston
- St Helen's Church, Sibbertoft
- Church of St Helen, St Helen Auckland
- St Helen's Church, St Helens, Isle of Wight
- Church of St Helen, St Helens, Merseyside
- St Helen's Church, Stapleford
- St Helen's Church, Stillingfleet, North Yorkshire
- St Helen's Church, Stonegate, York
- St Helen's Church, Tarporley, Cheshire
- St Helen's Church, Thorganby, North Yorkshire
- St Helen's Church, Thorney
- St Helen's Church, Treeton
- St Helen's Church, Trowell
- St Helen's Church, Waddington, Lancashire
- St Helen's Church, Welton
- St Helen's Church, Westcliff-on-Sea, Essex
- St Helen's Church, Wheathampstead, Hertfordshire
- St Helen's Church, Wheldrake, City of York
- St Helen's Church, Stonegate, York

== See also ==
- Saint Helena's Church (disambiguation)
- St James the Less and St Helen Church, Colchester, Essex, England
- St Mary's and St Helen's Church, Neston, Cheshire, England
- Category:Churches in St. Helens, Merseyside
