= St. Helen =

Saint Helen (abbreviated St. Helen and St Helen) may refer to:

== People ==
- Saint Helen of Constantinople, title for Helena (empress) (c. 250 – c. 330), mother of Constantine the Great
- Saint Helen of Caernarfon or Saint Elen, late 4th-century founder of churches in Wales
- Saint Helen of Serbia, medieval Queen of Serbia, died in 1314
- Saint Helen of Sinope (lived during the 1700s), Eastern Orthodox virgin martyr.

== Places ==
- Saint-Hélen, commune in the Côtes-d'Armor departement, France
- St. Helen, Michigan, unincorporated community in Roscommon County, Michigan, United States
  - Lake St. Helen, lake at St. Helen, Michigan
- St Helen Auckland, village in County Durham, England
  - Church of St Helen, St Helen Auckland, Anglican church
- St Helen Without, civil parish in Oxfordshire, England
- St Helen's Basilica, church in Birkirkara, Malta

== Other ==
- MV St Helen, ferry formerly at the Isle of Wight, now in Sardinia, Italy

== See also ==
- Helen (disambiguation)
- St Helens (disambiguation)
- St Helena (disambiguation)
- Sainte-Hélène (disambiguation)
- Santa Helena (disambiguation)
