= Santa Elena =

Santa Elena may refer to:

== Inhabited places ==
- Santa Elena, Entre Ríos, Argentina
- Santa Elena, Cayo, Belize
- Santa Elena, Corozal, Belize, a village in on the Belize–Mexico border
- Santa Elena, Toledo, a municipality in Toledo, Belize
- Santa Elena, a township in Medellín, Colombia
- Santa Elena, Costa Rica
- Santa Elena, Ecuador
- Santa Elena Province, Ecuador
- Santa Elena, San Salvador, a neighborhood in San Salvador, El Salvador
- Santa Elena, Usulután, El Salvador
- Santa Elena, El Petén, Guatemala
- Santa Elena, La Paz, Honduras
- Santa Elena, El Petén, Guatemala
- Santa Elena, Chiapas, locality in the city of Ocosingo, Mexico
- Santa Elena Municipality, Yucatán, Mexico
- Santa Elena, Paraguay
- Santa Elena, Virú, Peru
- Santa Elena, Camarines Norte, Philippines
- Santa Elena, Marikina, Philippines
- Santa Elena, Samar, Philippines
- Santa Elena, Spain
- Santa Elena de Jamuz, Castile and León, Spain
- Santa Elena, Texas, United States
- Santa Elena (Spanish Florida), modern Parris Island, South Carolina, United States
- Santa Elena de Uairén, Bolívar, Venezuela

== Other uses ==
- Santa Elena River, in Nor Cinti Province, Bolivia
- Santa Elena (Mexibús), a BRT station in Chimalhuacán, State of Mexico

== See also ==
- Santa Elena District (disambiguation)
- Sant'Elena (disambiguation)
- Saint Helena (disambiguation)
