= Saint Helena (disambiguation) =

Saint Helena is a British island in the South Atlantic.

Saint Helena may also refer to:

== Saints ==
- Saint Helena, mother of Constantine I, Roman empress and the mother of Emperor Constantine I the Great
- Saint Helena of Skövde, Swedish twelfth-century saint
- Saint Helena of Serbia, medieval Queen of Serbia, died in 1314
- Saint Elen, often anglicized as Helen, late 4th-century founder of churches in Wales

== Places ==
=== Atlantic Ocean ===
- Saint Helena (British Overseas Territory), officially known as 'Saint Helena, Ascension and Tristan da Cunha'

=== Australia ===
- St Helena, Victoria, a suburb of Melbourne
- St Helena Island, Queensland
- St Helena Tunnel, New South Wales

=== United States ===
- St. Helena, California
  - St. Helena AVA, California wine region in Napa Valley
- St. Helena Parish, Louisiana
- St. Helena Island, Maryland
- St Helena, Baltimore, Maryland
- St. Helena, Nebraska
- St. Helena, North Carolina
- Saint Helena Island, South Carolina, a barrier island
- Mount Saint Helena, California

== Ships ==
- HMS St. Helena (K590), a British frigate in commission in the Royal Navy from 1944 to 1945
- RMS St Helena (1963), a British Royal Mail Ship
- RMS St Helena (1989), a British Royal Mail Ship
- Saint Helena (1814), a packet schooner belonging to the British East India Company
- USS St. Helena (PF-86), the name briefly carried by HMS St. Helena (K590) after her return to United States Navy custody in 1946

== Schools ==
- Chesterfield St Helena School, High School for Girls in Chesterfield, England
- St Helena School, Colchester, secondary school in Colchester, England
- St Helena Secondary College, a High School in Victoria, Australia

== Other uses ==
- Saint Helena Medal, a French commemorative war medal established in 1857
- St. Helena (solitaire), a solitaire card game
- St Helena (play), a play by R. C. Sherriff
- St Helena Mill, Horsford, a windmill in Norfolk, United Kingdom
- St Helena's Church (disambiguation)

== See also ==
- Santa Elena (disambiguation)
- Sainte-Hélène (disambiguation)
- Santa Helena (disambiguation)
- St. Helen (disambiguation)
- St Helens (disambiguation)
