= Uxmal =

Ancient Maya city

- Óoxmáal
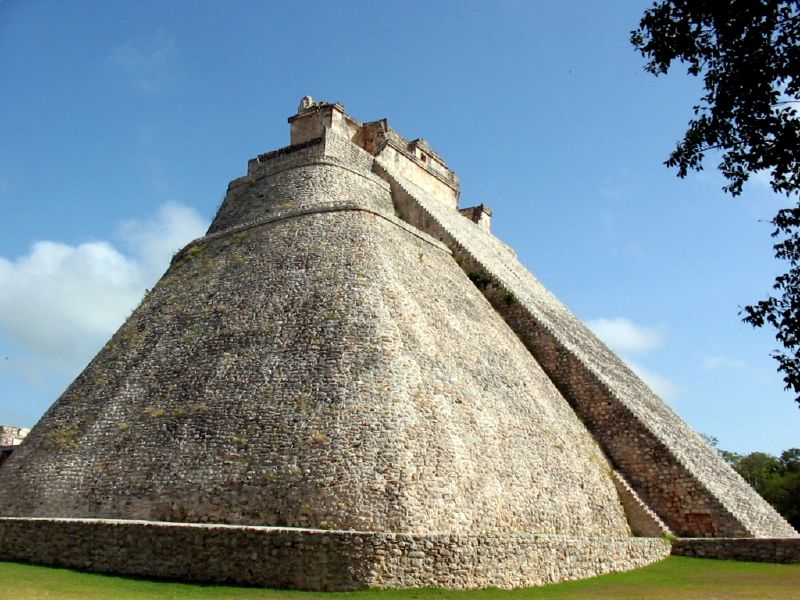
- Pyramid of the Magician

- Location within Mesoamerica Uxmal (Yucatán (state))
- 20°21′34″N 89°46′17″W
- Periods: Late Classic to Terminal Classic.
- Cultures: Maya civilization
- Location: Santa Elena Municipality, Yucatán, Mexico
- Region: Puuc

History
- Built: 700 AD
- Abandoned: 13th century

UNESCO World Heritage Site
- Official name: Pre-Hispanic Town of Uxmal
- Criteria: Cultural: i, ii, iii
- Reference: 791
- Inscription: 1996 (20th Session)

Uxmal (Yucatec Maya: Óoxmáal [óˑʃmáˑl]) is an ancient Maya city of the classical period located in present-day Mexico. It is considered one of the most important archaeological sites of Maya culture, along with Palenque, Chichen Itza and Calakmul in Mexico, Caracol and Xunantunich in Belize, and Tikal in Guatemala. It is located in the Puuc region of the western Yucatán Peninsula, and is considered one of the Maya cities most representative of the region's dominant architectural style. It was designated a UNESCO World Heritage Site along with the nearby ruins of Kabah, Sayil and Labna.

Uxmal is located 62 km south of Mérida, capital of Yucatán state in Mexico. Its buildings are noted for their size and decoration. Ancient roads called sacbes connect the buildings, and also were built to other cities in the area such as Chichén Itzá in modern-day Mexico, Caracol and Xunantunich in modern-day Belize, and Tikal in modern-day Guatemala.

Its buildings are typical of the Puuc style, with smooth low walls that open on ornate friezes based on representations of typical Maya huts. These are represented by columns (representing the reeds used for the walls of the huts) and trapezoidal shapes (representing the thatched roofs). Entwined snakes and, in many cases two-headed snakes are used for masks of the rain god, Chaac; its big noses represent the rays of the storms. Feathered serpents with open fangs are shown leaving from the same human beings. Also seen in some cities are the influences of the Nahua peoples, who followed the cult of Quetzalcoatl and Tlaloc. These were integrated with the original elements of the Puuc tradition.

The buildings take advantage of the terrain to gain height and acquire important volumes, including the Pyramid of the Magician, with five levels, and the Governor's Palace, which covers an area of more than 1,200 m^{2} (12,917 sq ft).

== Toponymy ==
The present name seems to derive from Oxmal, meaning "three times built." This seems to refer to the site's antiquity and the times it had to rebuild. The etymology is disputed; another possibility is Uchmal which means "what is to come, the future." By tradition, this was supposed to be an "invisible city," built in one night by the magic of the dwarf king.

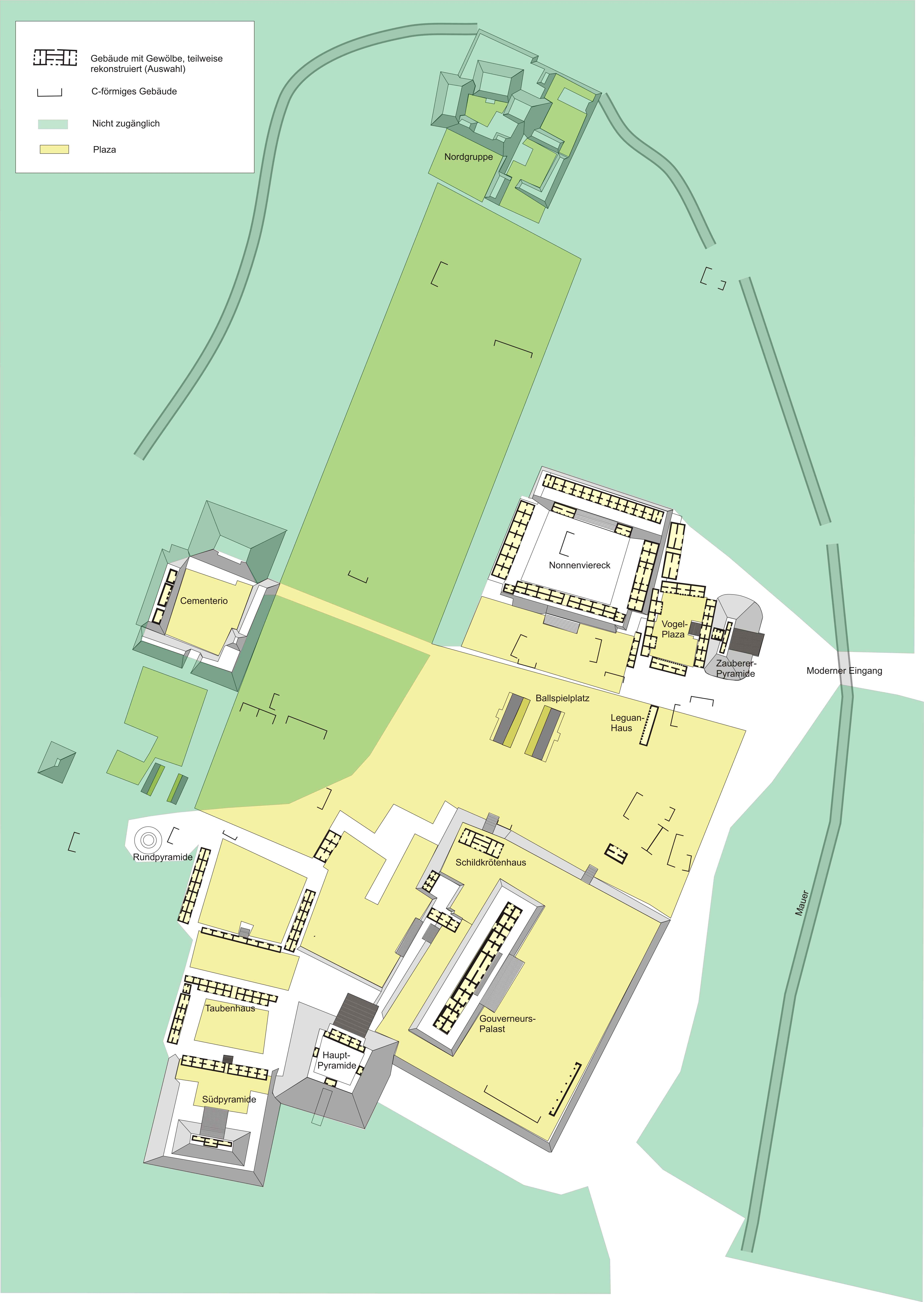
Map of a central portion of Uxmal

== Description of the site ==
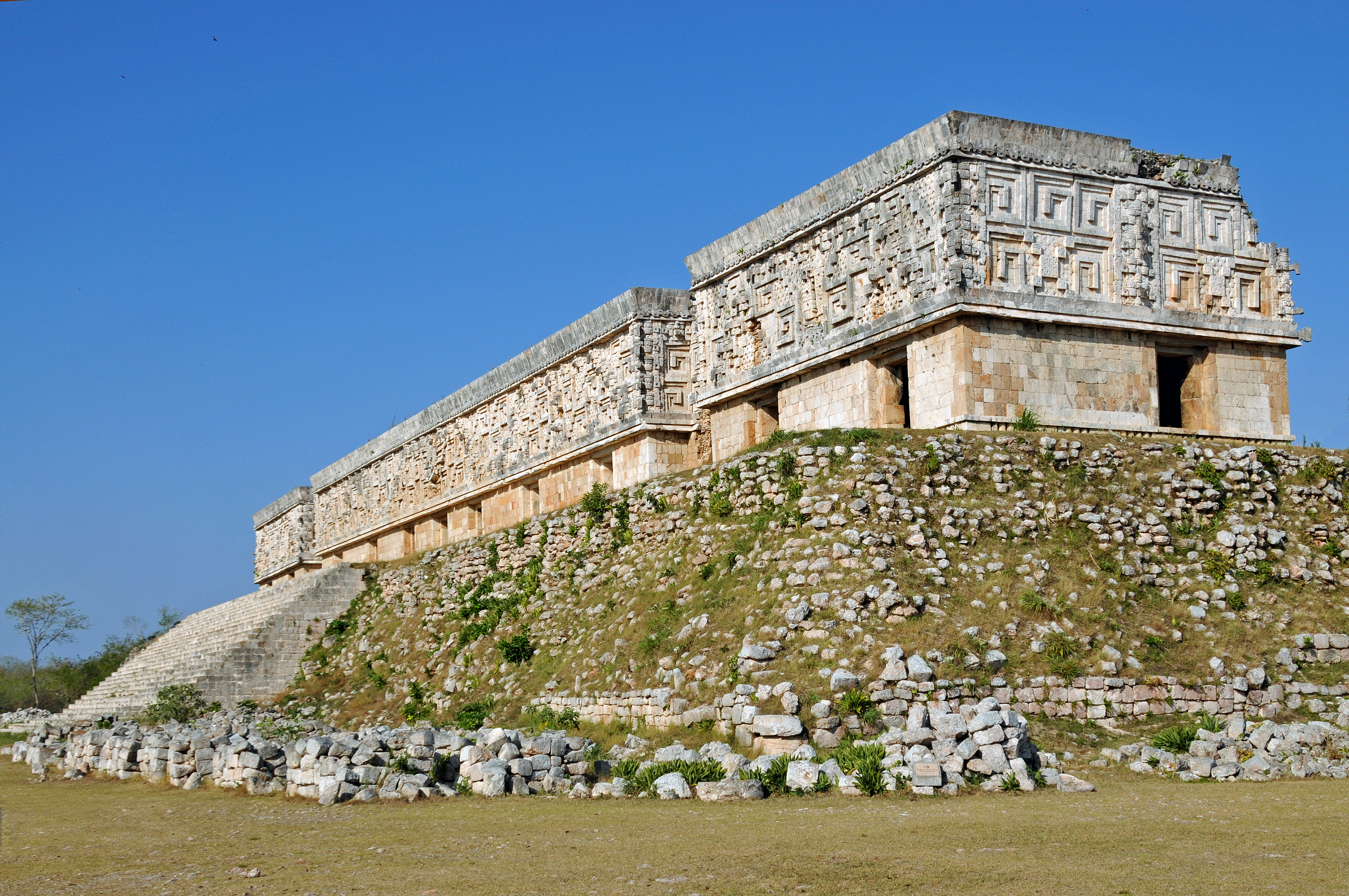
Governor's Palace

Some of the more noteworthy buildings include:

- The Governor's Palace, a long low building atop a huge platform, with the longest façades in Pre-Columbian Mesoamerica.

With an approximate azimuth of 118°, the building is oriented to the main pyramid of Cehtzuc, a small site located nearly 5 km to the southeast. Observing from there, Venus as evening star, when reaching its maximum northerly extremes, would have set behind the northern edge of the Governor's Palace. Since these events occur every eight years, always in late April or early May, heralding the onset of the rainy season, it is significant that the decoration of the building's facade contains almost 400 Venus glyphs placed in the masks of the rain god Chac, and that there are eight bicephalic serpents above the main entrance; additionally, numerals 8 in bar-and-dot notation appear on two Chac masks at the northern corners of the palace.

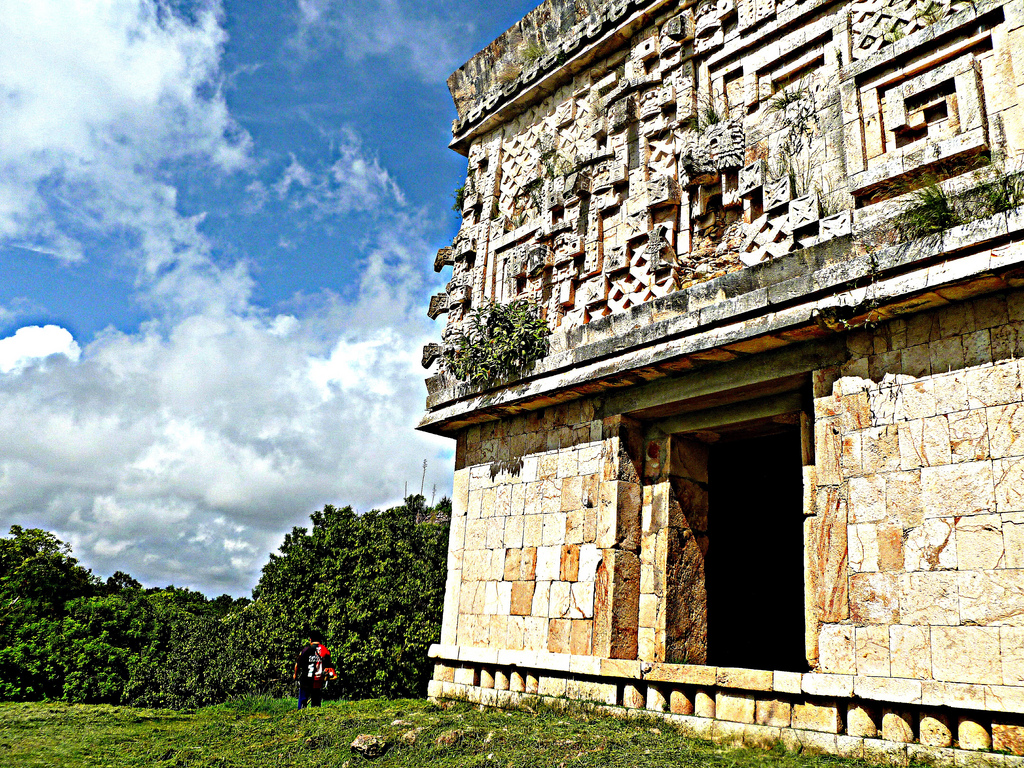
Governor's Palace details

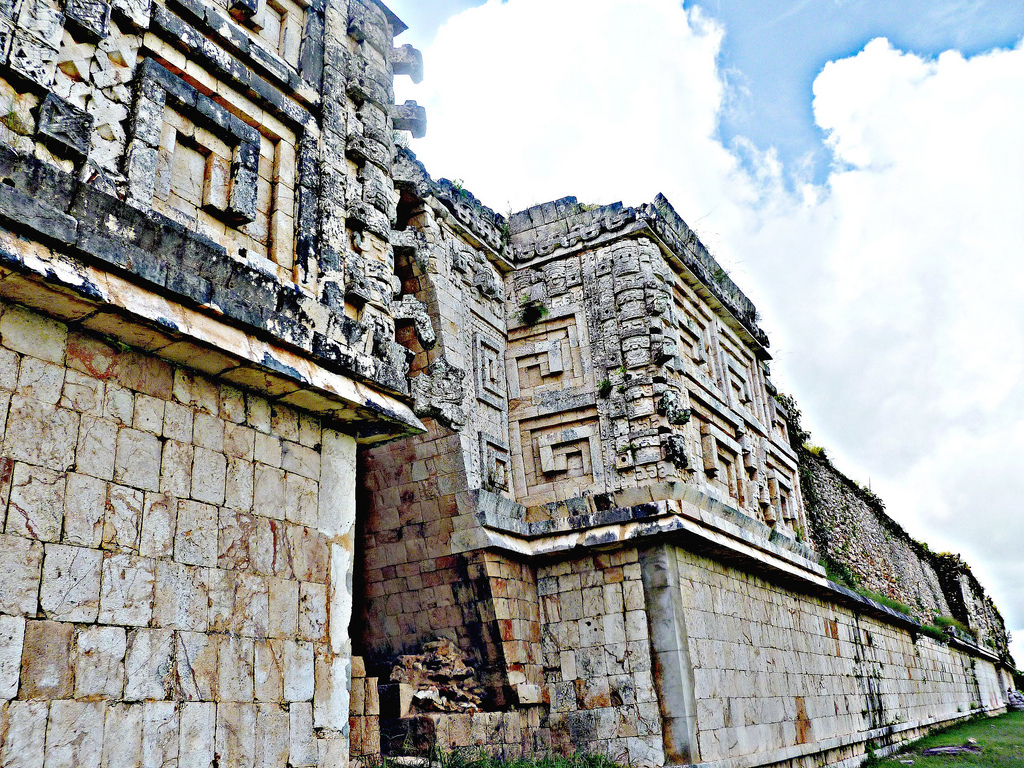
Governor's Palace rear view and details

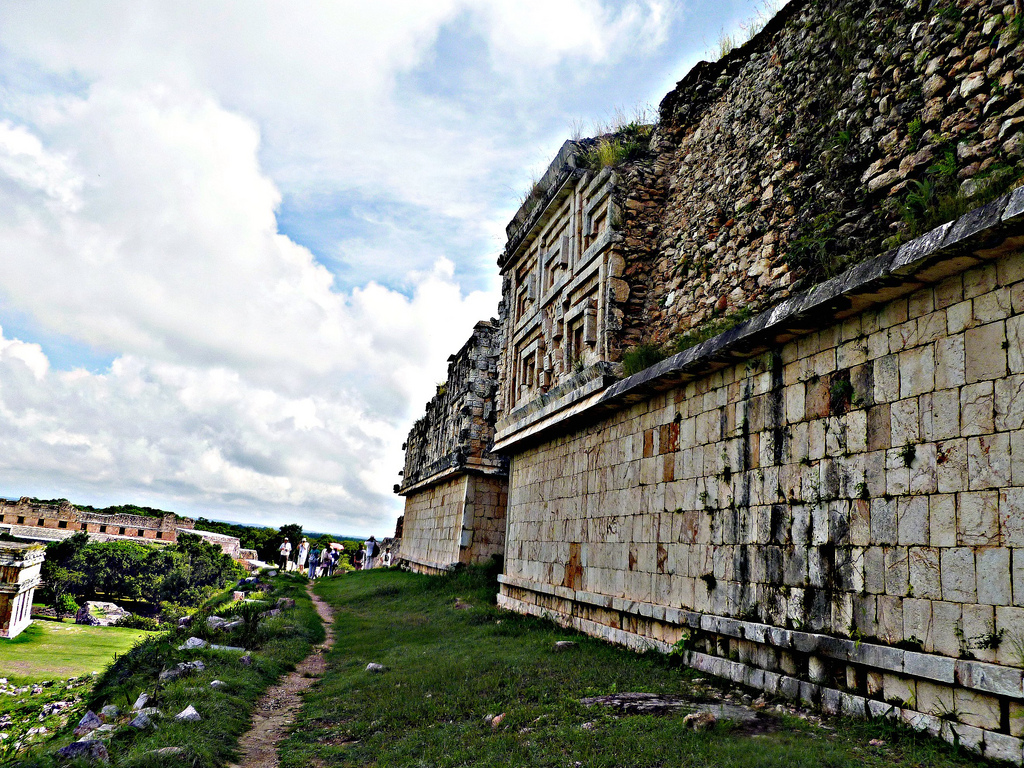
Governor's Palace rear view

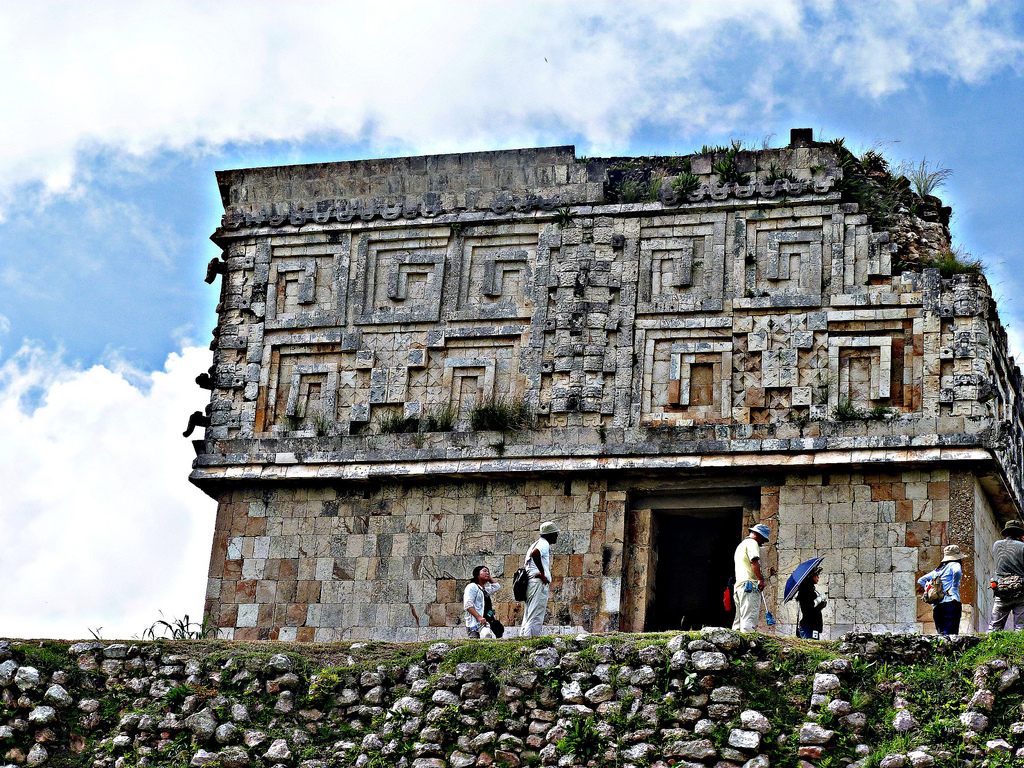
Governor's Palace side view

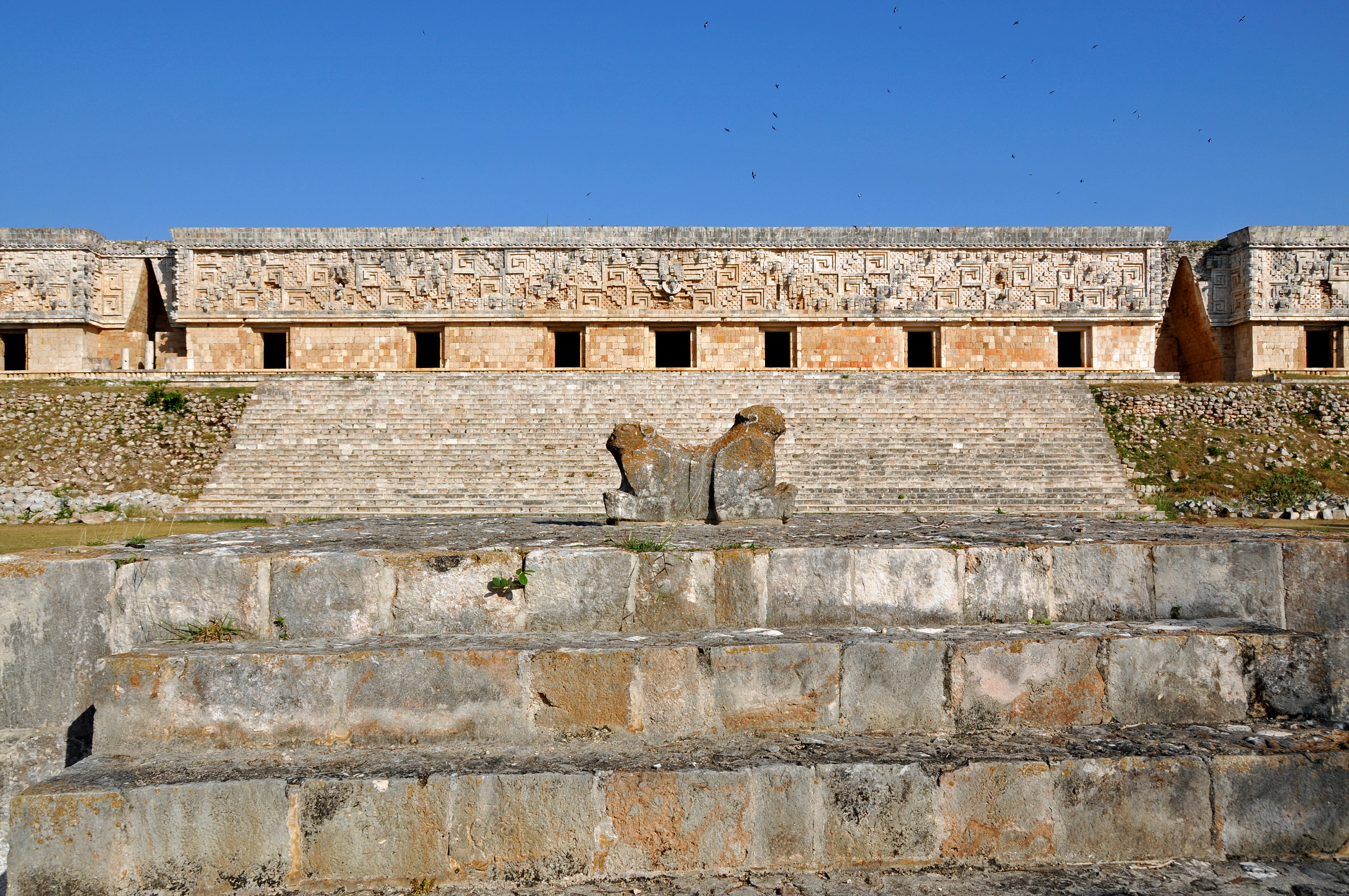
Throne of the Jaguar

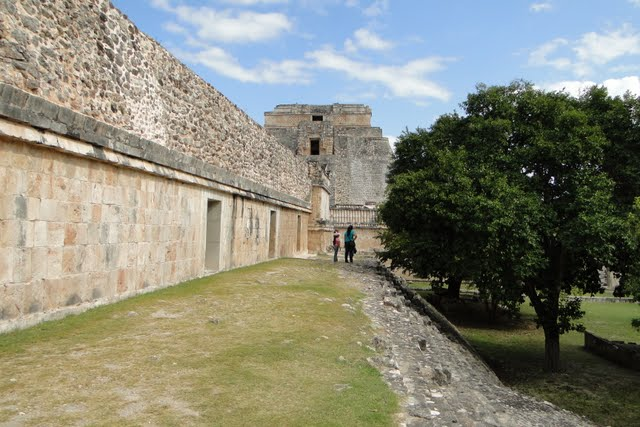
Nunnery Quadrangle and the Pyramid of the Magician

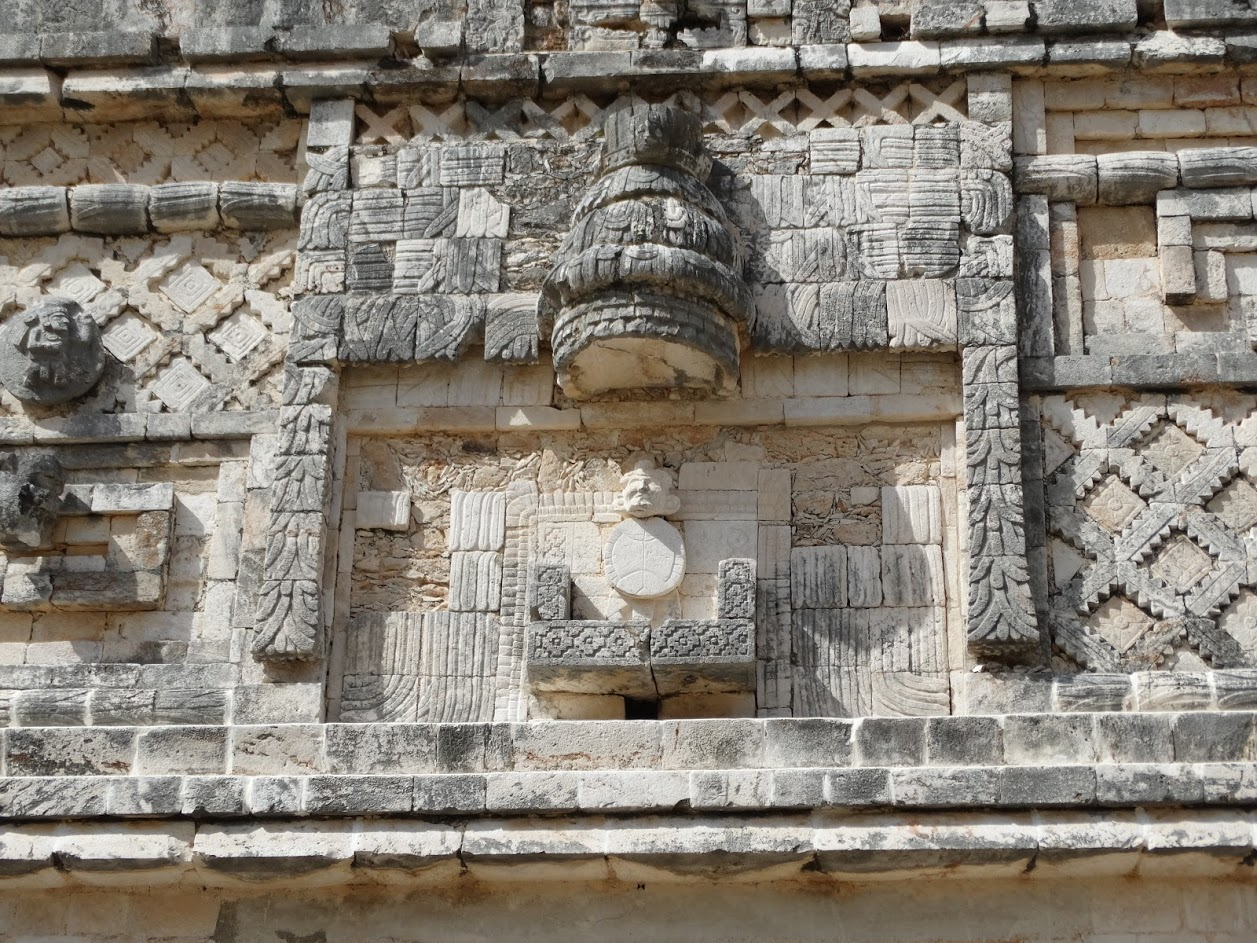
Traditional Mayan symbols

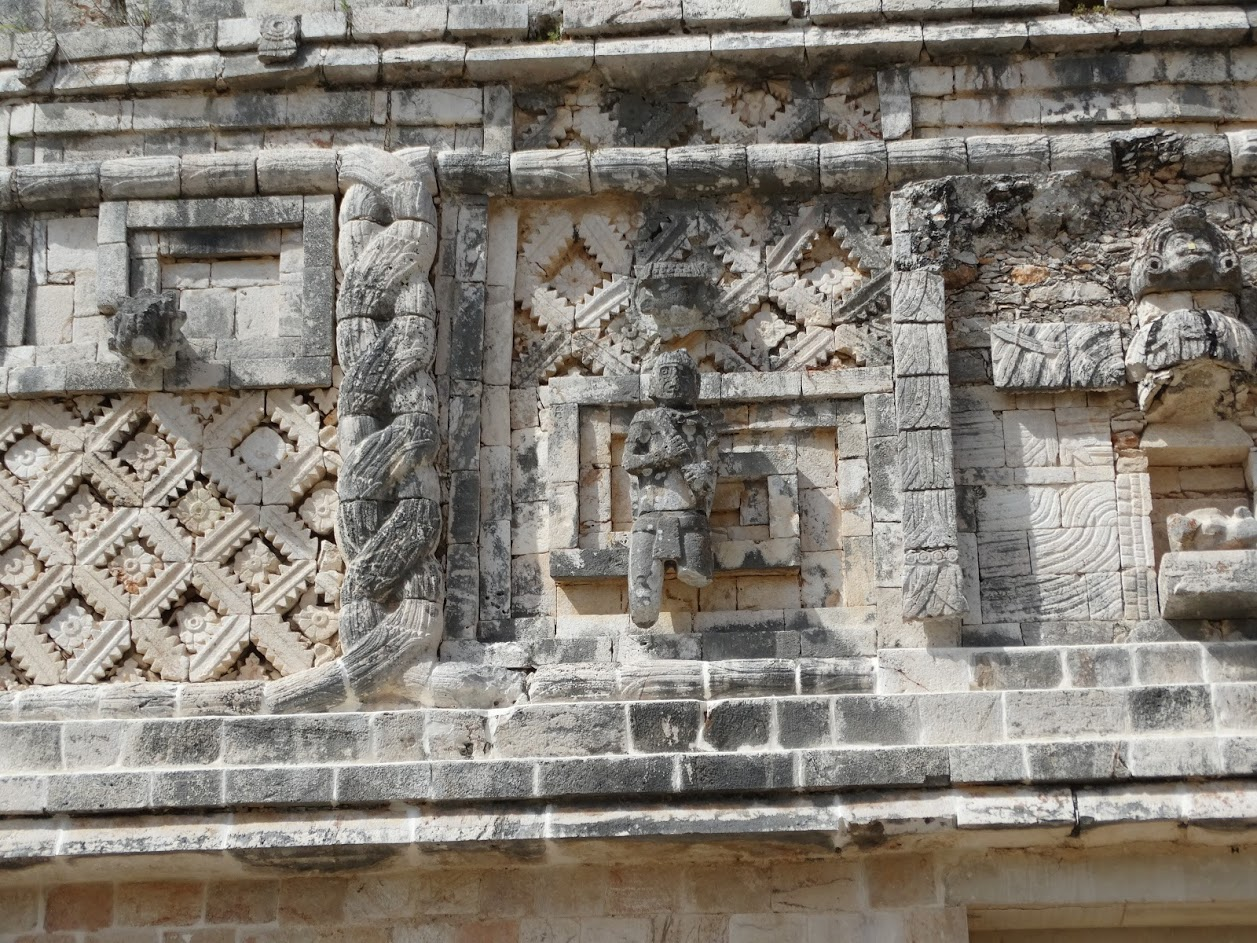
Maya images of people and animals

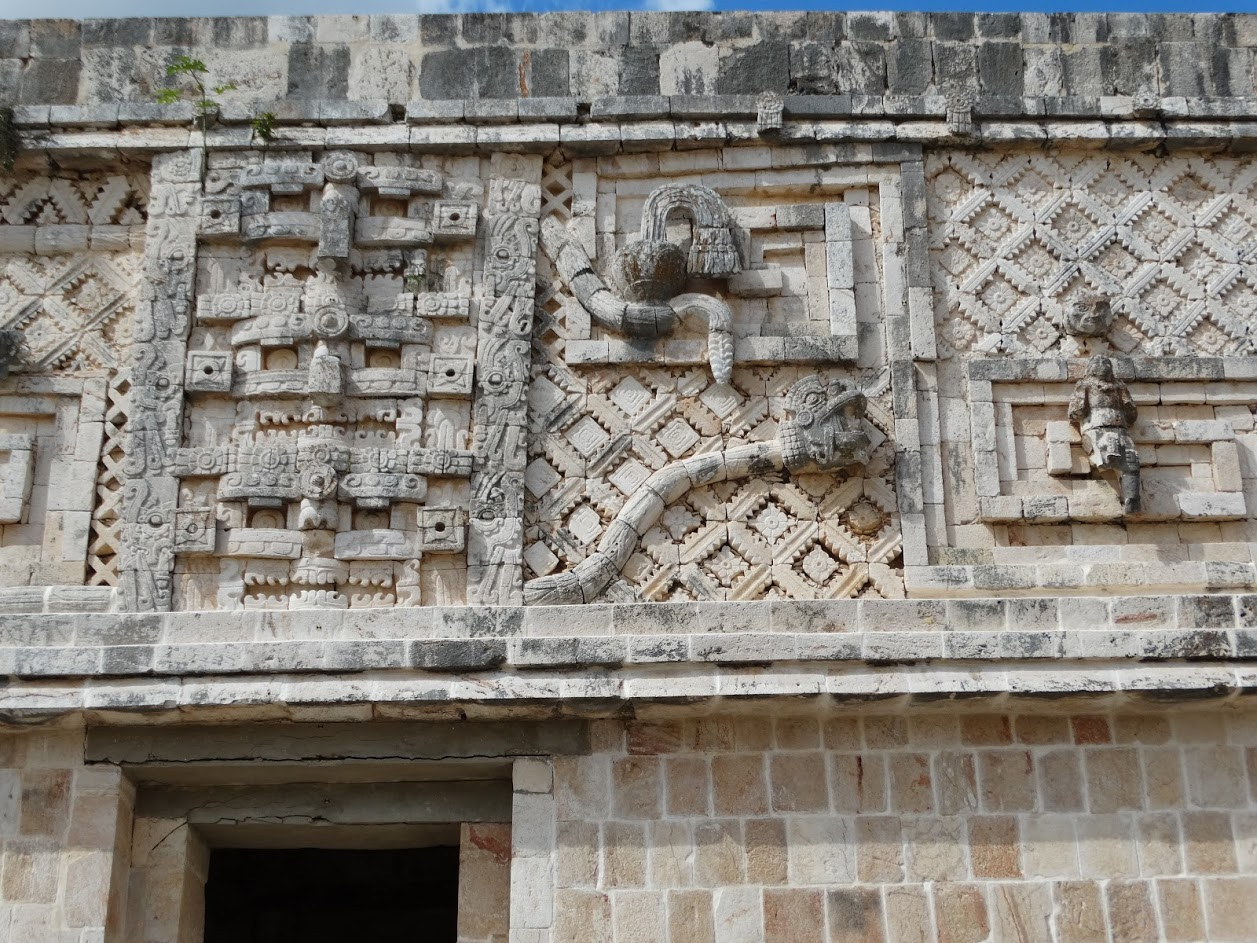
Snake and traditional Mayan lattice

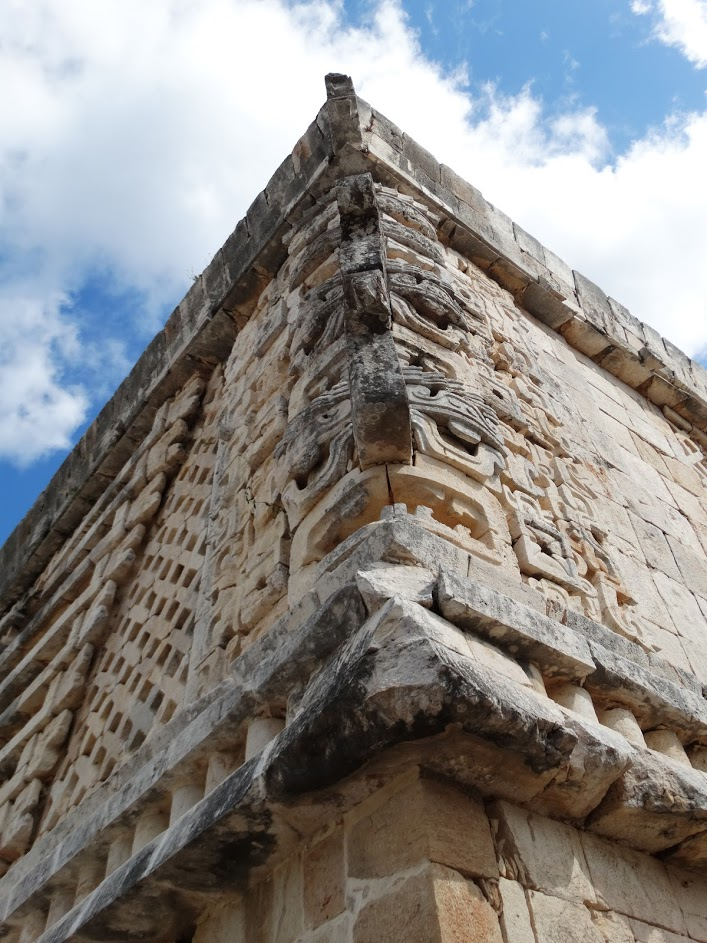
Sculptural image on the corner of the building

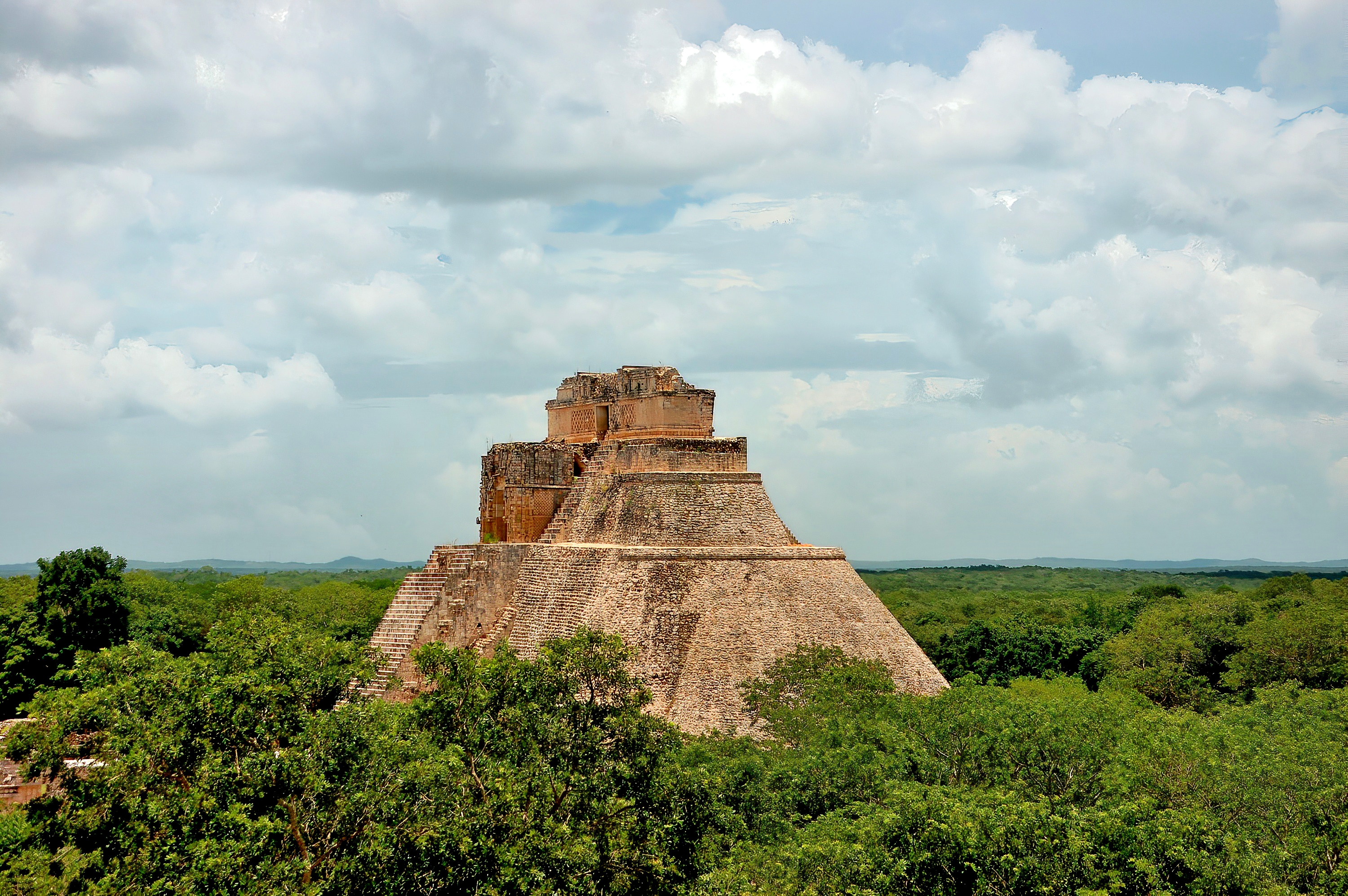
View of the pyramid and the surrounding jungle
- The Adivino (a.k.a. the Pyramid of the Magician or the Pyramid of the Dwarf), is a stepped pyramid structure, unusual among Maya structures in that its layers' outlines are oval or elliptical in shape, instead of the more common rectilinear plan. It was a common practice in Mesoamerica to build new temple pyramids atop older ones, but here a newer pyramid was built centered slightly to the east of the older pyramid, so that on the west side the temple atop the old pyramid is preserved, with the newer temple above it.

The structure is featured in one of the best-known tales of Yucatec Maya folklore, "el enano del Uxmal" (the dwarf of Uxmal), which is also the basis for the structure's common name. Multiple versions of this tale are recorded. It was popularised after one of these was recounted by John Lloyd Stephens in his influential 1841 book, Incidents of Travel in Central America, Chiapas, and Yucatán. According to Stephens' version, the pyramid was magically built overnight during a series of challenges issued to a dwarf by the gobernador (ruler or king) of Uxmal. The dwarf's mother (a bruja, or witch) arranged the trial of strength and magic to compete against the king.

- The Nunnery Quadrangle was built from 900-1000, and the name related with nuns was assigned in the 16th century because it resembled a convent. The quadrangle consists of four palaces placed on different levels that surround a courtyard. Of the different buildings that make up this palatial complex, several vault tops have been recovered, they are painted and represent partial calendrical dates from 906 to 907 AD, which is consistent with the Chan Chahk’ahk Nalajaw period of government. The formal entrance, the hierarchy of the structures through the different elevations, and the absence of domestic elements suggest that this space corresponds to a royal palace with administrative and non-residential functions, where the ruling group must have had meetings to collect the tribute, make decisions, and dictate sentences among other activities. These set of buildings are the finest of Uxmal's several fine quadrangles of long buildings. It has elaborately carved façades on both the inside and outside faces.
- A large Ballcourt for playing the Mesoamerican ballgame. Its inscription says that it was dedicated in 901 by the ruler Chan Chak K'ak'nal Ajaw, also known as Lord Chac (before the decipherment of his corresponding name glyphs). The ball court's condition is very deteriorated, and it’s made of two constructions of medium dimensions that make up the sides of the court with the rings by which the ball was to be introduced. The originally carved stone rings were removed to protect them from the elements and were replaced by reproductions. This game has always been related to mythical and cosmic aspects. The ball symbolized the movements of the stars in the sky and the players, in repeated occasions, symbolically staged the fight of the day against the night or the struggle of the deities of the underworld against the gods of heaven.

== Modern history of the ruins ==
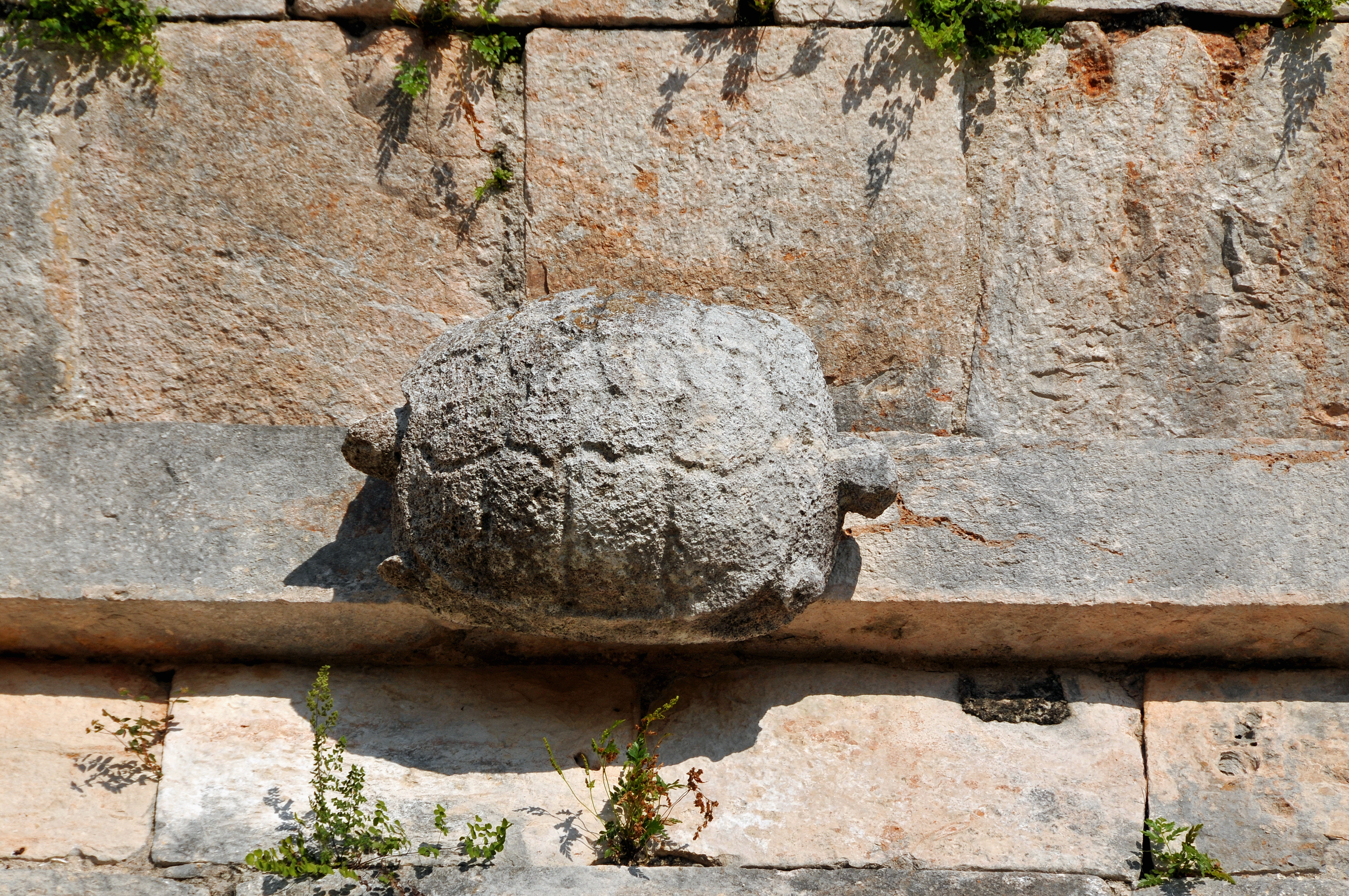
Detail of the "House of the Turtles"

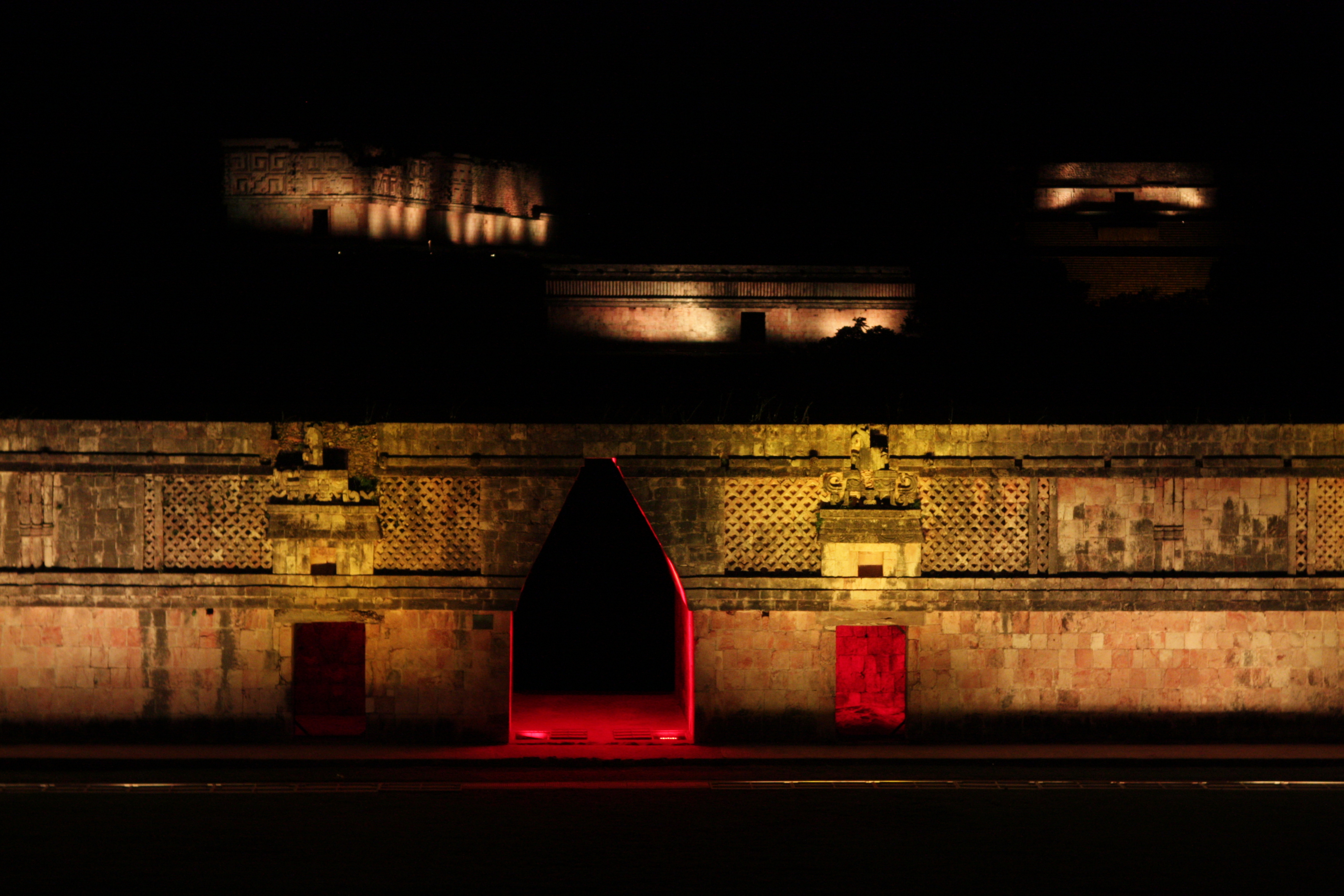
Lights and Sound nightly show on Nunnery Quadrangle

Sylvanus G. Morley made a map of the site in 1909 which included some previously overlooked buildings. The Mexican government's first project to protect some of the structures from risk of collapse or further decay came in 1927. In 1930 Frans Blom led a Tulane University expedition to the site. They made plaster casts of the façades of the "Nunnery Quadrangle"; using these casts, a replica of the Quadrangle was constructed and displayed at the 1933 World's Fair in Chicago, Illinois. The plaster replicas of the architecture were destroyed following the fair, but some of the plaster casts of Uxmal's monuments are still kept at Tulane's Middle American Research Institute. In 1936 a Mexican government repair and consolidation program was begun under José Erosa Peniche.

Queen Elizabeth II of the United Kingdom visited on 27 February 1975 for the inauguration of the site's sound & light show. When the presentation reached the point where the sound system played the Maya prayer to Chaac (the Maya rain deity), a sudden torrential downpour occurred.

== Microbial degradation ==
Microbial biofilms have been found degrading stone buildings at Uxmal and Kabah. Phototrophs such as Xenococcus are found more often on interior walls. Stone degrading Gloeocapsa and Synechocystis were also present in large numbers. Aureobasidium and Fusarium fungi species are present at Chichen Itza and Uxmal. Cyanobacteria were prevalent in the interiors of rooms with low light levels.

== See also ==
- List of archaeoastronomical sites sorted by country
- List of Mesoamerican pyramids
- Sayil
