= Sainte-Hélène =

Sainte-Hélène may refer to:

== Places ==
=== Canada ===
- Sainte-Hélène, Quebec, a municipality in the Bas-Saint-Laurent region
- Sainte-Hélène-de-Bagot, Quebec
- Sainte-Hélène-de-Breakeyville, a community within the City of Lévis, Quebec
- Sainte-Hélène-de-Mancebourg, Quebec
- Île Sainte-Hélène (Saint Helen's Island), an island in the Saint Lawrence River, part of the city of Montreal, Quebec
  - Fort de l'Île Sainte-Hélène, a fort on Saint Helen's Island

=== France ===
Sainte-Hélène is the name or part of the name of several communes in France:

- Sainte-Hélène, Gironde
- Sainte-Hélène, Lozère
- Sainte-Hélène, Morbihan
- Sainte-Hélène, Saône-et-Loire
- Sainte-Hélène, Vosges
- Sainte-Hélène-Bondeville, in the Seine-Maritime department
- Sainte-Hélène-du-Lac, in the Savoie department
- Sainte-Hélène-sur-Isère, in the Savoie department

== Other ==
- Jacques le Moyne de Sainte-Hélène (1659–1690), Canadian soldier
- Médaille de Sainte-Hélène, French commemorative medal to commemorate the campaigns of the soldiers under Napoleon I
- Sainte-Helene (grape), another name for the French wine grape Canari noir

== See also ==
- Saint Helena (disambiguation)
- Santa Helena (disambiguation)
- St. Helen (disambiguation)
- St Helens (disambiguation)
