= Sant'Elena =

Sant'Elena may refer to:

- Sant'Elena (island), an island of Venice, Italy
- Sant'Elena, Rome, a church in Rome, Italy
- Sant'Elena, Venice, a Gothic-style, Roman Catholic church in Venice, Italy.
- Sant'Elena, Veneto, a comune in the Province of Padua in the Italian region Veneto, Italy
- Sant'Elena Sannita, a comune in the Province of Isernia in the Italian region Molise, Italy

== See also ==
- Santa Elena (disambiguation)
