= Pyramid of the Magician =

Mesoamerican step pyramid in Uxmal, Mexico

- Pyramid of the Dwarf, Pirámide del adivino, Pyramid of the Soothsayer
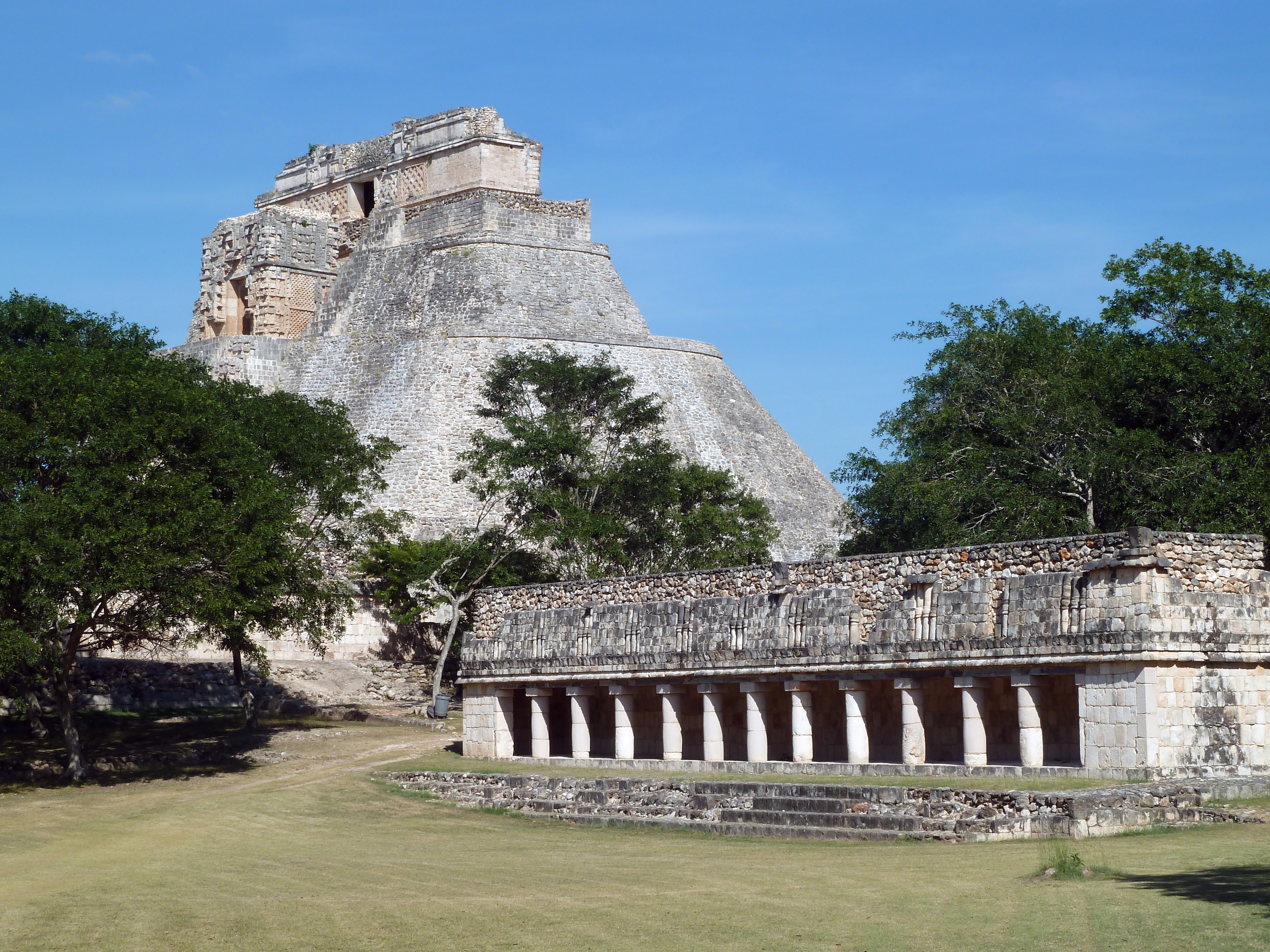

- Location within Mesoamerica
- 20°21′34″N 89°46′17″W
- Type: Temple
- Periods: 560–16th century
- Cultures: Maya
- Location: Yucatan
- Region: Uxmal

History
- Built: 560
- Built by: Unknown; Itzamna or his mother (Mythical)

Site notes
- Material: Limestone
- Height: 40 m (131 ft)
- Width: 81 m (266 ft)
- Condition: Abandoned

The Pyramid of the Magician (Spanish: Pirámide del adivino) is a Mesoamerican step pyramid located in the ancient Mayan city of Uxmal, Mexico. It is the tallest and most recognizable structure in Uxmal.

== Description ==
The Pyramid of the Magician is the central structure in the Maya ruin complex of Uxmal. Uxmal is located in the Puuc region of Mexico and was one of the largest cities on the Yucatán Peninsula. At its height, Uxmal was home to about 25,000 people. Like other Puuc sites, the city flourished from 600–1000 AD, with the great building period taking place between 700 and 1000 AD. The name Uxmal means 'thrice-built' in the Mayan language, referring to the many layers of construction of its most imposing structure.

The city of Uxmal was designated a UNESCO World Heritage Site in 1996, as it is considered that the ruins of the ceremonial structures represent the pinnacle of late Maya art and architecture in their design, layout and ornamentation. The Pyramid of the Magician dominates the center of the complex and is located at the entrance to the central court. It is positioned on the eastern side of the city, with its western face overlooking the Nunnery Quadrangle and is situated so that its western stairway faces the setting sun at the summer solstice.

Construction of the first pyramid temple began in the 6th century AD and the structure was expanded over the next 400 years. The pyramid fell into disrepair after 1000 A.D. and was thereafter looted during the Spanish Conquest of Yucatán. The first detailed account of the rediscovery of the ruins was published by Jean-Frederic Waldeck in 1838. Waldeck's account of Uxmal inspired John Lloyd Stephens and his illustrator friend, Frederick Catherwood, to make two extended visits to the site in 1839–1841, to record and sketch the layout of the complex. From his notes, Stephens published his now famous Incidents of Travel in the Yucatan.

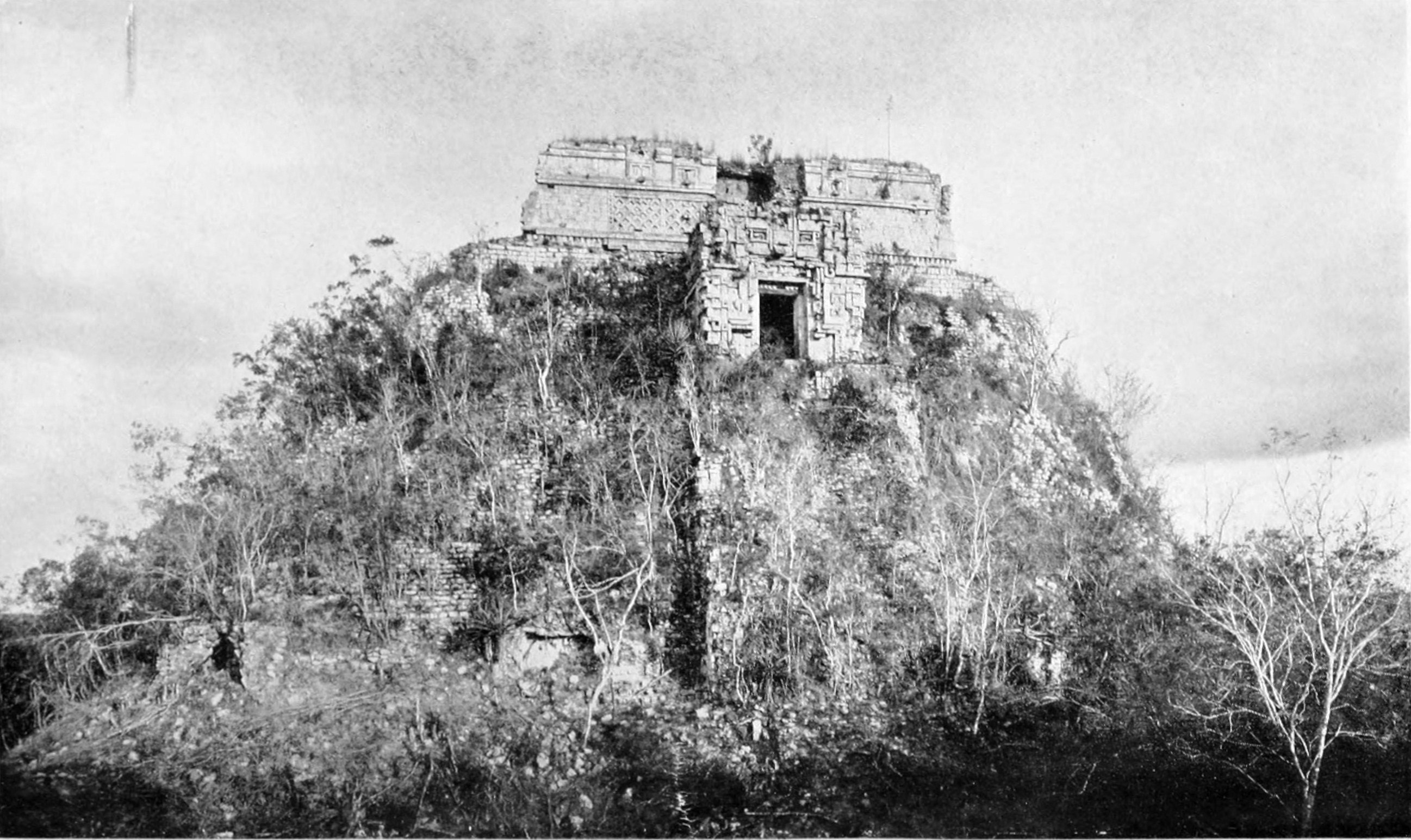
Pyramid of the Magician in 1913

Restoration efforts began in Uxmal in the mid-19th century. The Pyramid of the Magician was regularly repaired and maintained during this period. In the early 1970s, a major conservation project was undertaken by archaeologists from the National Institute of Anthropology and History (INAH - Instituto Nacional de Antropología e Historia). The aim of this effort was to consolidate the sides and flat terraces of the pyramid, and to improve the structural integrity of the temples. In 1988, Hurricane Gilbert swept across the Yucatán Peninsula, bringing high winds and abundant rainfall to the area which caused extensive damage to the exterior of the pyramid. A post-hurricane examination of the structure revealed cracks that had developed in the walls of the south side, on both sides of the west stairway. Damage to the vertical walls at the base of the pyramid, on the west side, was also noted.

Archaeologists and conservators with the INAH immediately began the process of developing a strategy for conservation and stabilization. The plan called for the strengthening the West façade, monitoring of any structural changes, and implementing emergency measures where needed. The cavity under the base of the stairway was filled with stonework, mortared with concrete and plaster. Movement monitors were placed at critical locations to detect failing integrity. The immediate measures taken to stabilize the pyramid had prevented a catastrophic collapse, but late in 1997, archaeologists noted additional small cracks had developed in the walls of the pyramid (Desmond). Conservation efforts are still underway and, as with El Castillo in Chichen Itza, visitors to the site are now prohibited from climbing the pyramid.

== Construction and design ==
=== Dimensions ===
The exact height of the Pyramid of the Magician is in dispute and has been reported as tall as 40 metres (131 feet) and as low as 27.6 metres (90.5 feet). The accepted median height is 35 metres (115 feet), with the base measuring approximately 69 by 49 metres (227 by 162 feet). Despite the absence of an exact measurement, the pyramid remains the tallest structure at Uxmal.

The Pyramid of the Magician is the most distinctive Mayan structure on the Yucatán Peninsula. It is considered unique because of its rounded sides, considerable height, steep slope, and unusual elliptical base.

=== Construction Phases ===
The construction of the pyramid was completed in several phases, over three centuries during the Terminal Classic Period. Marta Foncerrada del Molina, in her Fechas de radiocarbono en el area Maya, dates the beginning of construction on the Pyramid of the Magician to the sixth century, continuing periodically through the 10th century. "This placement depends both on the AD 560 ± 50 radiocarbon date for the Lower West Temple, as well as on Foncerrada’s stylistic dates for inner Temples II and II" (Kowalski 47). The Mayans followed the traditional practice of superimposition in the construction of the pyramid, gradually increasing the dimensions by building new structures on top of existing ones. The pyramid, as it stands today, is the result of five nested temples.

Parts of the first temple can be seen when ascending the western staircase; the second and third temples are accessed by the eastern staircase, through an inner chamber at the second level. In front of it Temple III, forming a narthex, is the fourth temple, which is clearly visible from the west side. A climb to the top of the east stairs reveals the fifth temple, situated atop Temples II and III (Stierlin 66).

The oldest structure, Temple I, is exposed on the west side of the structure, at the pyramid's base. This section dates from approximately the 6th century AD, deduced from a date inscribed on the door lintel and radiocarbon dating. The façade of this structure is heavily decorated with masks of the god, Chaac, a characteristic of the Chenes style of architecture, though the masks may have been added at a later date. The rest of the structure is covered by subsequent destruction. The passageway that led to this structure was closed off after the drenching rains of Hurricane Gilbert in 1988 in order to assure the preservation of the building.

Temple II can be entered through an opening in the upper part of the eastern staircase. This temple is only partially excavated. Its central chamber is supported by columns and it has a roof comb that is visible through a trench in the floor of Temple V above. Temple III is built onto the rear of Temple II and is not visible from the outside. It consists of a small central shrine and an antechamber.

Temple IV is entered from the west side and has the richest decorations. Constructed in the Chenes style, the temple's façade represents the mask of Chaac, whose jaws serve as the door. The façade of this structure is entirely covered with masks of the rain god and lattice ornamentation (Stierlin 66). Both upper temples are heavily influenced by the Chenes architectural style (Helfritz 149).

Temple V, also known as The House of the Magician or Soothsayer, is the final building phase of the pyramid. This structure sits atop the pyramid and dates from the ninth century. Temple V is composed of three rooms and also exhibits lattice ornamentation.

There are two staircases that lead to the top of the pyramid, both at a steep 60° angle. The Eastern Stairs are the wider of the two, starting from the base of the structure to the upper temple. Near the top of the eastern stairs is a smaller inner temple that cuts into the stairway itself.

The Western Stairs overlook the Nunnery and are richly decorated compared to the eastern side. Along both sides of this narrower staircase, images of the hooked-nose rain god Chaac line the steps. As worshipers climbed the stairs to the upper temple, they would be ceremoniously climbing the "Stairways of the Gods" towards the sacrificial altar.

=== Architectural styles ===
The earlier phases of the Pyramid of the Magician were constructed in the Puuc style: rather bare on the lower part and very ornate at higher levels. Early Puuc architecture included roof crests, inclined friezes, and an absence of mosaic decoration. Later Puuc styles were marked by the use of limestone in construction, often with smooth wall surfaces; plaster (stucco) finishes; masks and other representations of the rain god Chaac; and the prevalence of styling along horizontal lines. The sides of the pyramid were once thought to be adorned with different colored stucco, each color representing a direction.

Chenes design was prevalent in Late Classic Mayan construction, characterized by doorways surrounded by a single creature mask, with the entrance serving as the mouth. The façades of Chenes multi-chambered structures are often divided into three parts, with the center portion either projecting or receding from the rest of the façade; the chambers are typically adorned with Chaac masks. Chenes characteristics are found throughout the upper temples of the pyramid.

== Restoration and contemporary status ==
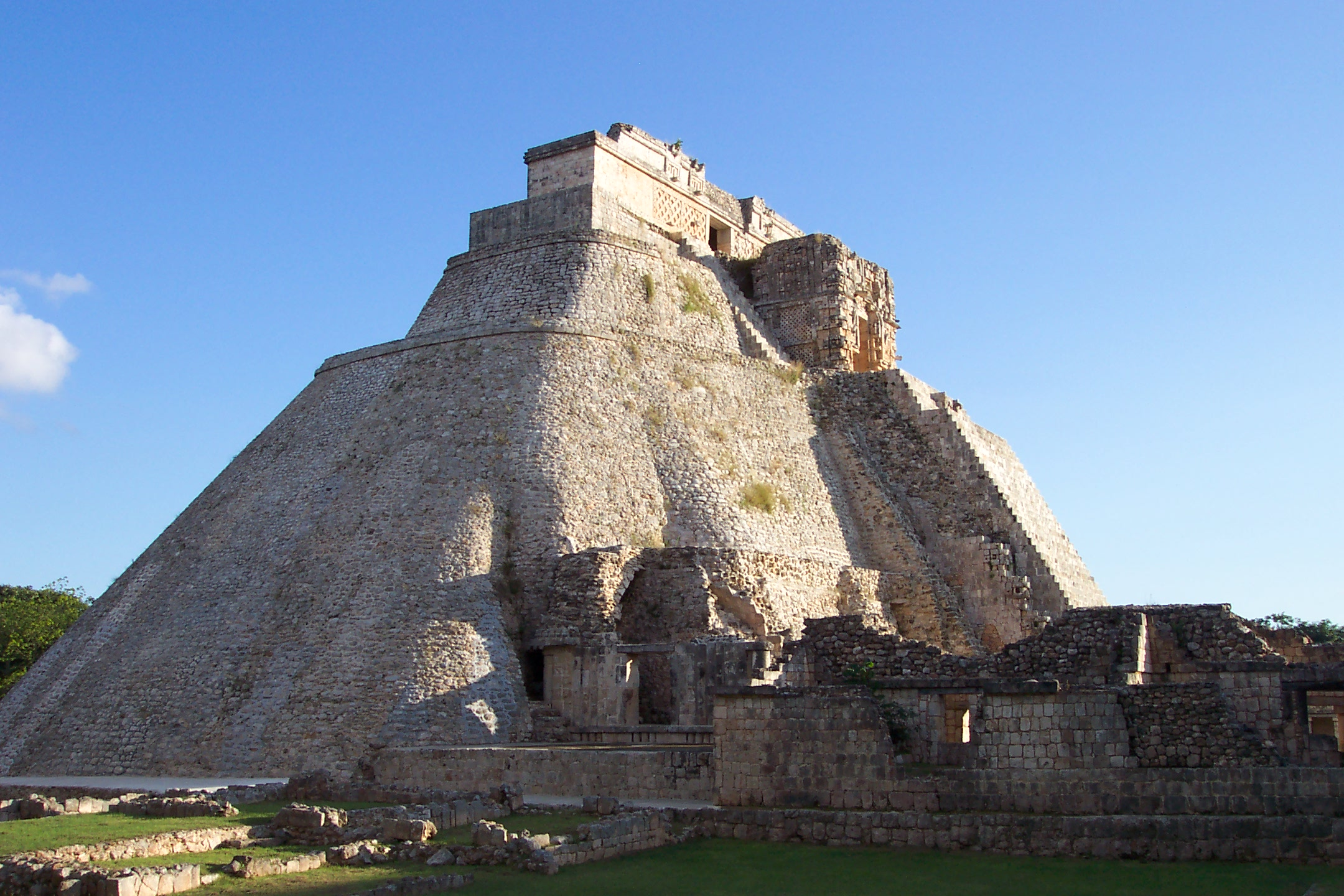
Pyramid of the Magician in 2009

The Pyramid of the Magician remains the central tourist attraction in the Uxmal complex. Modern facilities can be now found at the entrance, immediately in front of the pyramid; including a cafeteria, souvenir shop, and restrooms. There is also a small museum and auditorium. The site is open between 8am and 5pm, with a sound and light show, presented in both English and Spanish, every evening. The Pyramid of the Magician is the focal point of the show. The ratio of the base 69/49 is 1.4 which means the Maya probably used two intersecting circles of radius one, giving a very close approximation to the ellipses formed by the base of the pyramid. Two circles of radius one intersecting at the center of each other equals a circle to circle ratio of 1.5 which is closely associated with the Geometric construction of Phi and Euclid's introduction of the Vesica Pisces. Moreover, a ratio of 1.4 makes the "Golden Ratio".

== Legend ==
The name of the structure is derived from folk legends told by the indigenous Maya people. The age of these tales is unknown, as is the Pre-Columbian name of the structure. The tale existed in varied accounts concerning the construction of the Pyramid of the Magician.

According to one account, a magician-god named Itzamna was single-handedly supposed to have erected the pyramid in one night, using his might and magic.

Another tale holds that when a certain gong was to sound, the city of Uxmal was destined to be led by a boy "not born of woman". The gong was struck, one day, by a dwarf that was born unto no mother, but rather hatched from an egg by a childless, old woman (according to a tourist guide in Uxmal, this egg was an iguana egg, and the woman a witch). The sound of the gong struck fear into the city's ruler and the dwarf was ordered to be executed. The ruler reconsidered the death sentence, though, and promised that the dwarf's life would be spared if he could perform three seemingly impossible tasks. One of the tasks was to build a massive pyramid, taller than any building in the city, in a single night. The dwarf ultimately completed all the tasks, including the construction of the pyramid. The dwarf was hailed as the new ruler of Uxmal and the structure was dedicated to him.

A slightly different version of this tale is recounted by Hans Li in The Ancient Ones: Legend tells that this temple-pyramid was built by a powerful dwarf magician, who was hatched from an egg by his mother. Under a threat by an Uxmal king he was ordered to build this temple within a fortnight, or else lose his life (82).

In other surviving versions, the old woman is portrayed as a witch or sorceress and the dwarf is a boy who magically reaches adulthood overnight.

The official legend as told to John Lloyd Stephens in 1840 by a local Maya native follows:

There was an old woman who lived in a hut that was located on the exact spot where the finished pyramid now stands. This old woman was a witch who one day went into mourning that she had no children. One day, she took an egg and wrapped it in cloth and placed it in a corner of her small hut. Every day she went to look at the egg until one day it hatched and a small creature, closely resembling a baby, came from the enchanted egg.

The old woman was delighted and called the baby her son. She provided it with a nurse and took good care of it so that within a year it was walking and talking like a man. It stopped growing after a year and the old woman was very proud of her son and told him that one day he would be a great Lord or King.

One day, she told her son to go the House of the Governor and challenge the King to a trial of strength. The dwarf didn't want to go at first but the old woman insisted and so to see the King he went. The guards let him in and he threw down his challenge to the King. The King smiled, and told the dwarf to lift a stone that weighed three arrobas 34kg (75 pounds). At this the dwarf cried and ran back to his mother. The witch was wise, and told her son to tell the King that if the King would lift the stone first, then he would lift it also. The dwarf returned and told the King what his mother told him to say. The king lifted the stone and the dwarf did the same. The King was impressed, and a little nervous, and tested the dwarf for the rest of the day with other feats of strength. Each time the King performed an act, the dwarf was able to match it.

The King became enraged that he was being matched by a dwarf, and told the dwarf that in one night he must build a house higher than any other in the city or he would be killed. The dwarf again returned crying to his mother who told him to not lose hope, and that he should go straight to bed. The next morning the city awoke to see the Pyramid of the Dwarf in its finished state, taller than any other building in the city.

The King saw this building from his palace and was again enraged. He summoned the dwarf and ordered one final test of strength. The dwarf had to collect two bundles of Cogoil wood, a very strong and heavy wood, and the king would break the wood over the head of the dwarf, and after that the dwarf could have his turn to break the wood over the King's head.

The dwarf again ran to his mother for help. She told him not to worry and placed an enchanted tortilla on his head for protection. The trial was to be performed in front of all the great men of the city. The King proceeded to break the whole of his bundle over the dwarf’s head, one stick at a time. The King failed to injure the dwarf and then tried to bow out of his challenge. In full view of the town’s great men, though, he knew he had no choice but to go ahead and let the dwarf have his turn.

The second stick of the dwarf’s bundle broke the Kings skull into pieces and he fell dead at the foot of the dwarf, who was hailed as the new King (Ranney 80-1).

== Quotes ==
Stephens and Catherwood visited Uxmal first in 1839, then again during their expedition of 1841. Describing his first view of the ruins, Stephens writes:

"We took another road, and, emerging suddenly from the woods, to my astonishment came at once upon a large open field strewed with mounds of ruins, and vast buildings on terraces, and pyramidal structures, grand and in good preservation, richly ornamented, without a bush to obstruct the view, and in picturesque effect almost equal to the ruins of Thebes... ...The place of which I am now speaking was beyond all doubt once a large, populous, and highly civilized city. Who built it, why it was located away from water or any of those natural advantages which have determined the sites of cities whose histories are known, what led to its abandonment and destruction, no man can tell." John Lloyd Stephens (64)

"The pyramid is an image of the world; in turn, that image of the world is a projection of human society. If it is true that man invents gods in his own image, it is also true that he sees his own image in the images that the sky and the earth offer him. Man makes human history of the inhuman landscape; nature turns history into cosmogony, the dance of the stars." Octavio Paz (294)

"The classical pyramid form has been abandoned here. It is as if the Mayan architects had remembered the mountain peaks where the gods had been worshipped in the hazy past." Hans Helfritz (149)

== See also ==
- El Castillo, Chichen Itza
- List of Mesoamerican pyramids
- Temple of the Inscriptions at Palenque
- Tikal Temple I
- Tikal Temple II
- Tikal Temple III
- Tikal Temple IV
- Tikal Temple V
