= Chan Chak Kʼakʼnal Ajaw =

Ruler of the pre-Columbian Maya polity at Uxmal

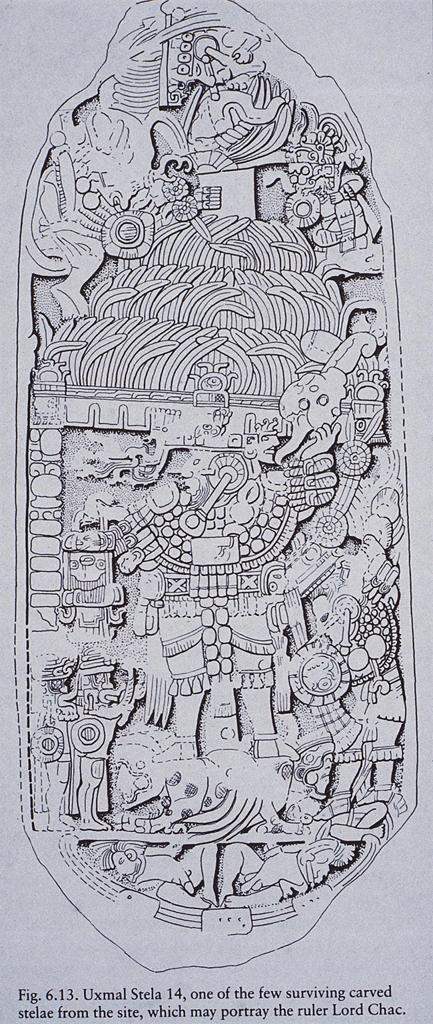
Uxmal Stela 14 Drawing

Kʼahkʼ Pulaj Chan Chaahk, also known as Lord Chac before the decipherment of his corresponding name glyphs, is currently the only archaeologically identified ruler of the pre-Columbian Maya polity at Uxmal, who ruled in the early 10th century.

Only a handful of details are known from this king, as hieroglyphic inscriptions, while very prominent in the Southern Maya Lowlands, are scarce in the north. What is known is that Lord Chac acceded to the throne somewhere at the end of the 9th century. During his rule, between 890–910 AD, some of the largest and most impressive buildings in Uxmal, such as the so-called Nunnery Quadrangle and the Governor's Palace, were built. An inscription at a large ballcourt in Uxmal, for playing the Mesoamerican ballgame, informs us it was dedicated in 901 during the reign of this king.

== Lord Chac in the hieroglyphic inscriptions ==
While informally named Lord Chac (or Chan Chaak Kʼakʼnal Ajaw), hieroglyphs found in Uxmal give his full personal name as Kʼahkʼ Pulaj Chan Chaahk (Chaahk That Burns The Sky With Fire). The phrase Kʼahkʼnal Ajaw may very well be a title denoting him as the king of Kʼahkʼnal, which may indicate this to be the local toponym of Uxmal itself instead of a part of the king's name. An argument in favour of this idea is that, while the title is given on the aforementioned ballcourt marker, it is absent on stela 14, on which this paramount is depicted. Here Lord Chac is depicted as a Chaahk impersonator, wearing a cutaway mask of the deity, his broad hat, conch-shell trumpet, axe and incense bag. The hieroglyphic inscription transcribes as ubaah kʼahkʼ pulaj chan chaahk tzeh kab kʼin, meaning "it is the image of K'ahk' Pulaj Chan Chaahk, left hand of the sun" (transcription and translation by the editor; for a better drawing see external links).

== More Lord Chacs ==
Many Maya archaeologists agree that there was only one Lord Chac king of Uxmal. However, disagreement has risen among a few archaeologists, indicating that there may have been more rulers of Uxmal that carried one form or another of the name Chac. On Altar 10 the hieroglyphic compound for the name Chaahk (written phonetically as CHAAK-ki) occurs at least twice: once with the by now familiar name Kʼahkʼ Pulaj Chan Chaahk, but the second time as part of the possible name Kʼinich ? Chaahk. A third individual whose name includes Chaahk might also be named on the same monument, although the hieroglyphs are eroded, decreasing legibility.

It is not uncommon for Maya polities to have recurring names: many kings at the site of Piedras Negras carry Ahk (turtle) as part of their name; at the site of Toniná, Chapaht (centipede) is a prevalent name; and at Calakmul the name Yuknoom (meaning unknown) occurs several times. It might be that Chac is a recurring name at Uxmal, similar to those at the aforementioned sites. The scarcity of inscriptions at Uxmal (and other Puuc sites for that matter) makes this question difficult to answer, however, and most archaeologists still favour the idea of a single Lord Chac.
