= Santa Helena =

Santa Helena may refer to:

- Helena of Constantinople, the mother of Emperor Constantine the Great
- Saint Helena, an island in the South Atlantic Ocean
- Santa Helena de Goiás, a municipality in Brazil
- Santa Helena de Minas, a municipality in Brazil
- Santa Helena, Paraná, a municipality in Brazil
- Santa Helena, Santa Catarina, a municipality in Brazil
- Santa Helena, Maranhão, a municipality in Brazil
- Santa Helena del Opón, a town and municipality in Colombia
- Grupo Santa Helena, a group of painters
- Santa Helena Esporte Clube, a Brazilian football (soccer) club

== See also ==
- Saint Helena (disambiguation)
- Sainte-Hélène (disambiguation)
- St. Helen (disambiguation)
- St Helens (disambiguation)
