= Saint Helena's Church =

Saint Helena's Church or St Helena's Church may refer to:

- Church of St Helena, Austerfield, South Yorkshire, England
- St Helen's Church, Lundy, Devon, UK is often incorrectly called St Helena's.
- St Helena's Church, Willoughby, Lincolnshire
- St Helena's Church, Thoroton, Nottinghamshire, UK
- St Helena's Church, West Leake, Nottinghamshire, UK
- St. Helena's Church (Bronx, New York), USA
- Parish Church of St. Helena, Beaufort, South Carolina, USA

== See also ==
- St Helen's Church (disambiguation)
