= Santa Elena Municipality =

Municipality in the Mexican state of Yucatán

Santa Elena
- Municipality

- Region 7 Sur #066

- Location of the Municipality in Mexico
- Coordinates: 20°21′N 89°46′W
- Country: Mexico
- State: Yucatán
- Mexico Ind.: 1821
- Yucatán Est.: 1824
- Municipality Est.: 1918

Government
  - Type: PRI 2012–2015
  - Municipal President: Rogelio Kauil Moreno

Area
  - Total: 694.90 km^{2} (268.30 sq mi)
- Elevation: 31 m (102 ft)

Population (2010)
  - Total: 3,833
  - Density: 5.516/km^{2} (14.29/sq mi)
- Time zone: UTC-6 (Central Standard Time)
- INEGI Code: 066
- Major Airport: Merida (Manuel Crescencio Rejón) International Airport
- IATA Code: MID
- ICAO Code: MMMD

Santa Elena Municipality is a municipality in the Mexican state of Yucatán containing 694.90 km^{2} of land and is located roughly 95 km south of the city of Mérida.

== History ==
The original location founded in this area was named Nohcacab and was inhabited during the Classic Maya period (600–1000 AD). At the conquest an encomienda, that is a tribute-paying small community with an ethnically mixed population which included Spanish people, criollos, mestizos and mulattos, was established. In the early 1840s the explorer John Lloyd Stephens used this small community as a base from which he and his companions departed to explore the Puuc area: thanks to this fact we still have detailed accounts about the people of Nohcacab and their culture, as well as drawings showing how these visitors perceived the village at that time.

Nohcacab was attacked, and even burned down, several times: the second burning in 1849, during the Caste War of Yucatán, which devastated the village forcing most of the Spanish and criollo population to emigrate into Merida. It is very likely that around that time the village was officially renamed as Santa Elena.

In 1865, with the arrival of approximately 300 German colonists, who settled there to form the Villa Carlota farming colony under the initiative of Emperor Maximilian I of Mexico, the village began rebuilding. Although this farming colony collapsed in 1867, several German families remained in the village.

== Governance ==
The municipal president is elected for a three-year term. The town council has four councilpersons, who serve as Secretary and councilors of public works, markets and cemeteries.

The Municipal Council administers the business of the municipality. It is responsible for budgeting and expenditures and producing all required reports for all branches of the municipal administration. Annually it determines educational standards for schools.

The Police Commissioners ensure public order and safety. They are tasked with enforcing regulations, distributing materials and administering rulings of general compliance issued by the council.

== Communities ==
The head of the municipality is Santa Elena, Yucatán. Besides the seat, the other populated areas of the municipality include Chac, Chetoliy, Chimay, Kabh, Ruinas de Uxmal, Sabac-há, Sacx-axal, Sankté, San Simón, Santa Ana, Uitz, and Yaxché. The largest populations are shown below:

Community	Population
Entire Municipality (2010)	3,833
San Simón	357 in 2005
Santa Elena	3252 in 2005

== Local Festivals ==
- 10 to 24 January – the feast in honor of Santo Cristo del Amor
- 17 May – the festival in honor of Santos Reyes of San Mateo

== Tourist attractions ==
=== Architectural ===
- San Mateo Church

=== Archaeological ===
- A number of archaeological sites including: Uxmal, Kabah, Nohpat, Xcoh and Mul chic (Puuc Region)

== Climate ==
Climate data for Santa Elena
Month	Jan	Feb	Mar	Apr	May	Jun	Jul	Aug	Sep	Oct	Nov	Dec	Year
Mean daily maximum °C (°F)	29.6 (85.3)	31.5 (88.7)	34 (93)	35.9 (96.6)	37.0 (98.6)	34.8 (94.6)	34.3 (93.7)	34.0 (93.2)	33.1 (91.6)	31.7 (89.1)	30.4 (86.7)	29.2 (84.6)	33.0 (91.4)
Mean daily minimum °C (°F)	13.2 (55.8)	14.0 (57.2)	16.0 (60.8)	18.0 (64.4)	19.9 (67.8)	20.5 (68.9)	19.5 (67.1)	19.6 (67.3)	19.8 (67.6)	18.3 (64.9)	16.2 (61.2)	14.4 (57.9)	17.5 (63.5)
Average precipitation cm (inches)	2.5 (1)	2.8 (1.1)	3.0 (1.2)	4.8 (1.9)	7.4 (2.9)	14 (5.7)	13 (5.2)	16 (6.2)	19 (7.6)	12 (4.7)	4.1 (1.6)	2.8 (1.1)	102 (40.1)
Source: Weatherbase
