= Santon, Norfolk =

Village in Norfolk, England

Coordinates: 52.453494°N 0.68951°E

Santon
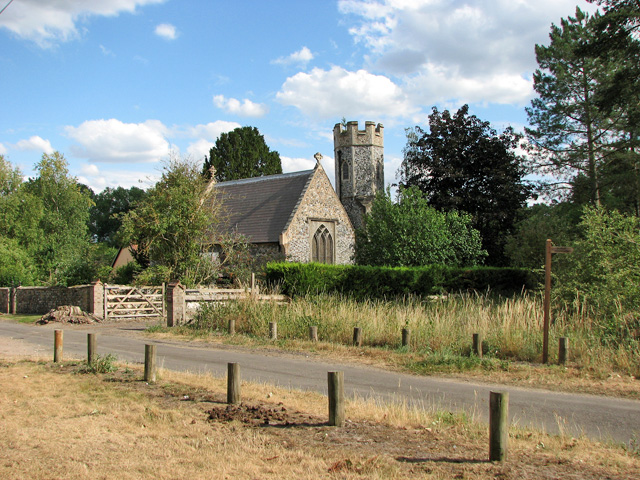
- All Saints' church in Santon

- Location within Norfolk
- Civil parish: Lynford
- District: Breckland
- Shire county: Norfolk
- Region: East
- Country: England
- Sovereign state: United Kingdom
- Post town: BRANDON
- Postcode district: IP27
- Police: Norfolk
- Fire: Norfolk
- Ambulance: East of England

Santon is a depopulated village near Santon Downham, in the civil parish of Lynford, in the Breckland district, in Norfolk, England. Moated earthworks and other remains of the medieval village are a scheduled monument. In 1931 the parish had a population of 24. On 1 April 1935 the parish was abolished and merged with Lynford.

The villages name means 'Sandy farm/settlement'.

The village church of All Saints' was rebuilt from ruins in the 17th century by Thomas Bancrofte, the sole parishioner at that time.

The site is adjacent to the Forestry Commission's St Helen's picnic site.

== See also ==
- St Helen's Church, a demolished church near Santon
