= John Lloyd Stephens =

American explorer, writer, and diplomat (1805–1852)

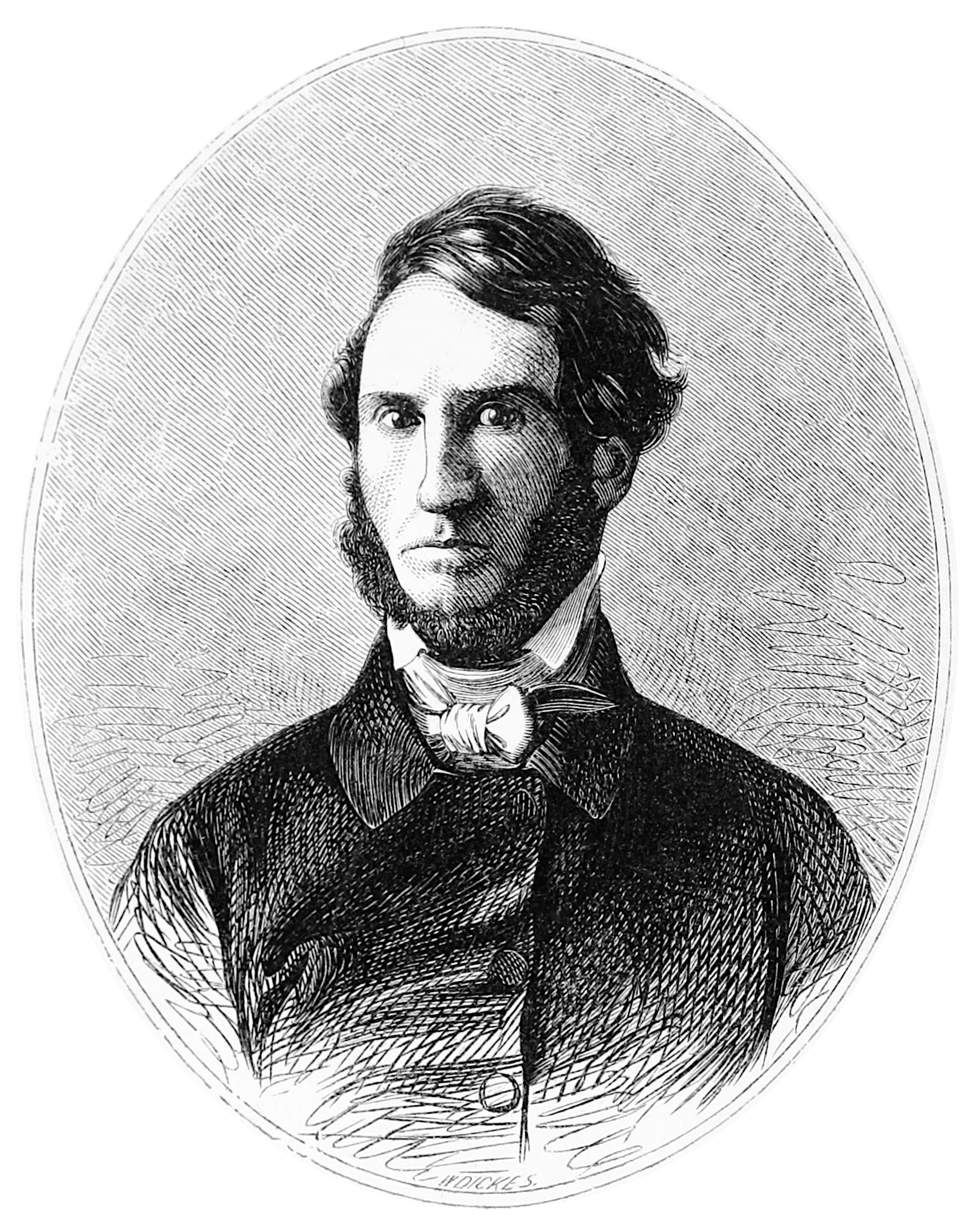
- Stephens' portrait published in 1854
- Born: November 28, 1805; Shrewsbury, New Jersey, US
- Died: October 13, 1852 (aged 46); New York City, New York, US
- Resting place: New York City Marble Cemetery
- Education: Columbia College; Litchfield Law School
- Occupations: Explorer; attorney; railroad executive; author
- Known for: Exploration of Mexico and Central America, including descriptions of Maya sites
- Scientific career
- Workplaces: Panama Railroad Company

John Lloyd Stephens (November 28, 1805 – October 13, 1852) was an American explorer, writer, and diplomat. He was a pivotal figure in the rediscovery of Maya civilization throughout Middle America. He was also a driving force behind the building of the Panama Canal Railway in the 1850s, which in turn was instrumental to the construction of the Panama Canal.

== Early life ==
John Lloyd Stephens was born November 28, 1805, in the Township of Shrewsbury, New Jersey, in an area that would later become Red Bank, New Jersey. He was the second son of Benjamin Stephens, a successful New Jersey merchant, and Clemence Lloyd, daughter of an eminent local judge. The following year, the family moved to New York City, where Stephens received an education in the Classics at two privately tutored schools. At the age of 13, he enrolled at Columbia College, becoming a member of the Philolexian Society, and graduating at the top of his class four years later in 1822.

After studying law with an attorney for a year, he attended the Litchfield Law School. He passed the bar exam after completing his course of study and practiced in New York City.

Stephens embarked on a journey through Europe in 1834 and went on to Egypt and the Levant, returning home in 1836. He later wrote several popular books about his travels and explorations.

== Politics ==
He was recommended for the post of Minister to the Netherlands in 1837, but President Martin Van Buren nominated Harmanus Bleecker, who served until 1842. In 1846, Stephens was a delegate to the state constitutional convention, where he was responsible for the introduction and adoption of a conciliation court (small claims court).

== Mesoamerican studies ==
Stephens read with interest early accounts of ruined cities of Mesoamerica by such writers and explorers as Alexander von Humboldt and Juan Galindo. In 1839, President Martin Van Buren commissioned Stephens as Special Ambassador to Central America. While there, the government of the Federal Republic of Central America fell apart in civil war. He later published an account of the events he witnessed in Incidents of Travel in Central America, Chiapas, and Yucatán.

Stephens and his traveling companion, architect and draftsman Frederick Catherwood, first came across Maya ruins at Copán, having landed in British Honduras (now Belize). They were astonished at their findings and spent two weeks mapping the site. Stephens surmised that it must have been built by some long-forgotten people, as he could not imagine it was the native Mayans. However, Catherwood noted the facial resemblance to modern Mayans. Stephens was able to buy the city of Copan for a sum of $50 and had dreams of floating it down the river and into museums in the United States.

They went on to Palenque, Quiriguá and Uxmal. They reached Palenque on May 11, 1840, and left in early June. While there, they documented the Temple of the Inscriptions, the Temple of the Cross, the Temple of the Sun, and the Temple of the Foliated Cross. They continued investigating Maya ruins with a return trip to Yucatán in October 1841. According to Stephens's book about the trip, they visited a total of 44 Mayan sites such as Chichen Itza, Izamal, Kabah, the gateway at Labná, Mayapan, Sayil, Tulum, Uxmal, and Xtampak. In Uxmal, they documented the Governor's House, the Nunnery Quadrangle, and the Pyramid of the Magician. Catherwood also drew a famous view of the well at Bolonchén.

Catherwood's drawings and lithographs showed the Maya, without question, to have been the authors of some of the most artistic and intellectual works of pre-Columbian America. Besides large constructions, they produced works of artistic refinement such as stone and plaster sculptures, frescoes, painted pottery, and bas-reliefs in wood. As a result of their explorations, Stephens and Catherwood argued convincingly that the Mayans built the ancient Central American cities in contrast to the theory that ethnic groups from European or Asian civilizations had built them.

Stephens's books served to inspire Edgar Allan Poe, who reviewed three of Stephens's books for the New York Review and Graham's Magazine.

== Panama Railroad Company ==
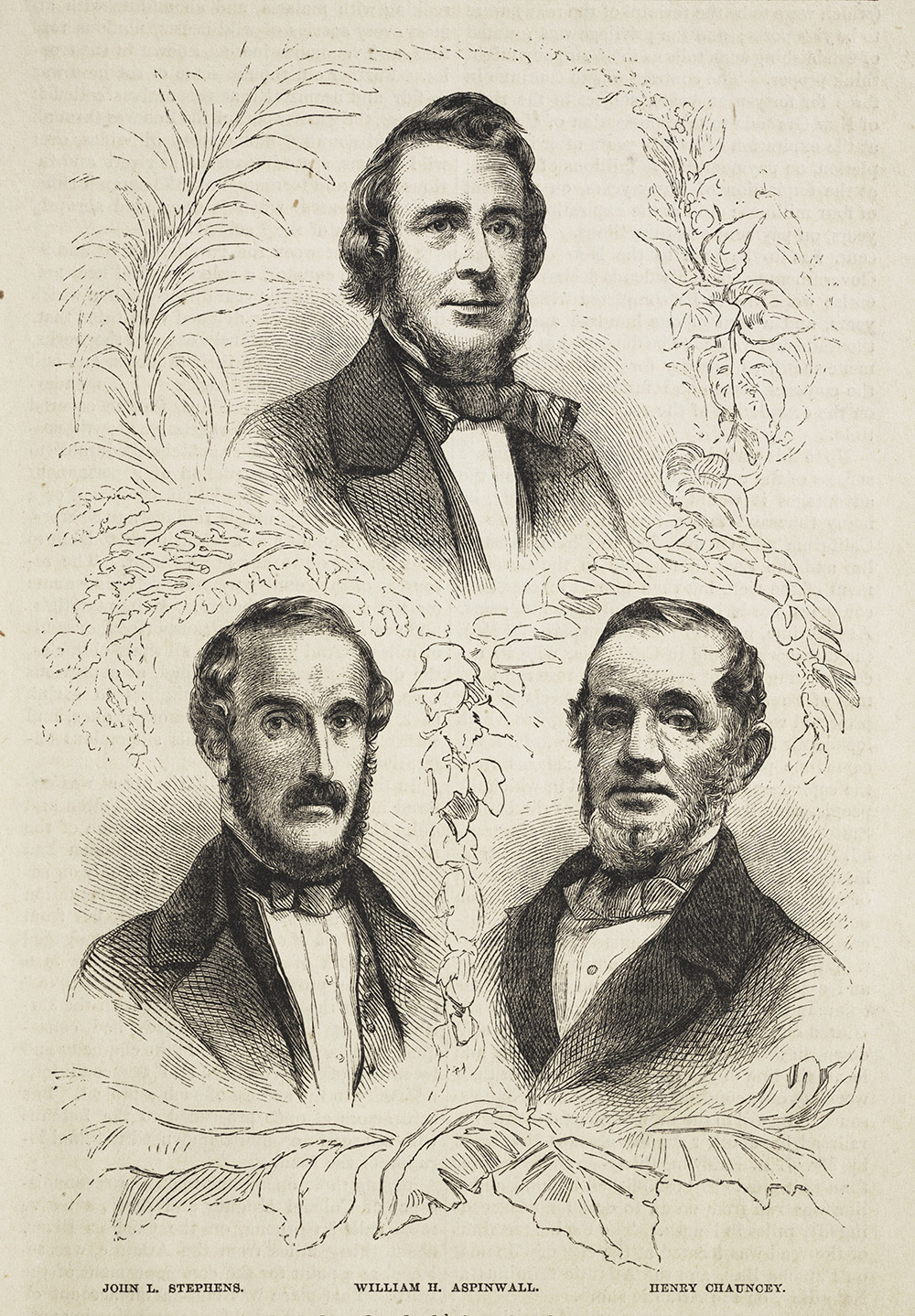
Founders of the Panama Railroad, John L. Stephens, William H. Aspinwall, and Henry Chauncey, published in 1859

At the time, England enjoyed a monopoly over the ocean navigation to and from the United States. Stephens obtained a charter from the state of New York and incorporated the Ocean Steam Navigation Company. The company acquired two steamships, the Washington and the Hermann, which made journeys to Europe.

Stephens was one of the founders of the Panama Railroad Company in 1849, along with mercantilist William H. Aspinwall, and Wall Street financier Henry Chauncey. The railroad was to provide a transportation link across the isthmus of Panama, in part as response to the California gold rush of 1848 and the surge of individuals wanting to cross the North American continent. Stephens visited Panama and New Granada to make arrangements for the laying of the railroad. On his way to Bogotá, the capital of New Granada, he fell off his mule and sustained severe injuries from which he never fully recovered. He returned to the United States and was appointed the first president of the railroad. He was the only one of the founders who spent time with the project in the jungle and was the driving force of it until his death of malaria in 1852. The railroad was eventually completed in 1855.

== Personal life ==
In 1841, Stephens was elected to the American Philosophical Society. While in Panama, he was struck down by malaria in spring 1852. He recovered sufficiently to return to New York, only to have a recurrence of the disease. He died October 13, 1852, and was buried at New York City Marble Cemetery.

== Legacy ==
Stephens is the subject of the following works: Maya Explorer by Victor Wolfgang von Hagen, first published in 1947, and Jungle of Stone by William Carlsen (2016).

== Publications ==
- Incidents of Travel in Egypt, Arabia Petraea, and the Holy Land (1837)
- Incidents of Travel in Greece, Turkey, Russia, and Poland (1838)
- Incidents of Travel in Central America, Chiapas and Yucatán, Vols. 1 & 2 (1841) (Reissued by Cambridge University Press, 2010. ISBN 978-1-108-01730-5)
- Incidents of Travel in Yucatán, Vols. 1 & 2 (1843)
