= Santa Elena District =

Santa Elena District may refer to:

- Santa Elena, Paraguay, a district of the Cordillera department
- Santa Elena District, La Cruz, in Guanacaste province, Costa Rica
