= St Helen's Church, Santon =

Demolished church in England

Coordinates: 52.4535°N 0.7057°E

St Helen's Church was a church located near Santon, Norfolk, England. Its site is a scheduled monument. It was no longer in existence by 1368.

The church is noted in the Domesday Book: "Among the lands of Stigand the archbishop which William de Noiers keeps for the use of the king, in Thetford ... one church of St. Helen, with one ploughland ..."
