= St Helens railway station =

St Helens railway station may refer to:

Current stations

- St Helens Central railway station on the Liverpool–Wigan line in England
- St Helens Junction railway station on the Liverpool–Manchester line in England

Former stations

- St Helens Central railway station (Great Central Railway) (closed 1952), terminus of a branch line from Lowton St Mary's, England
- St Helens railway station (Isle of Wight) (closed 1953), on the Bembridge branch in England
- St Helens, one of the stops on the Swansea and Mumbles Railway (closed 1960) in Wales
- West Auckland railway station, County Durham, England (closed 1962) known as St Helens until 1878
