= St Helen Auckland =

Village in County Durham, England

Coordinates: 54.637°N 1.709°W

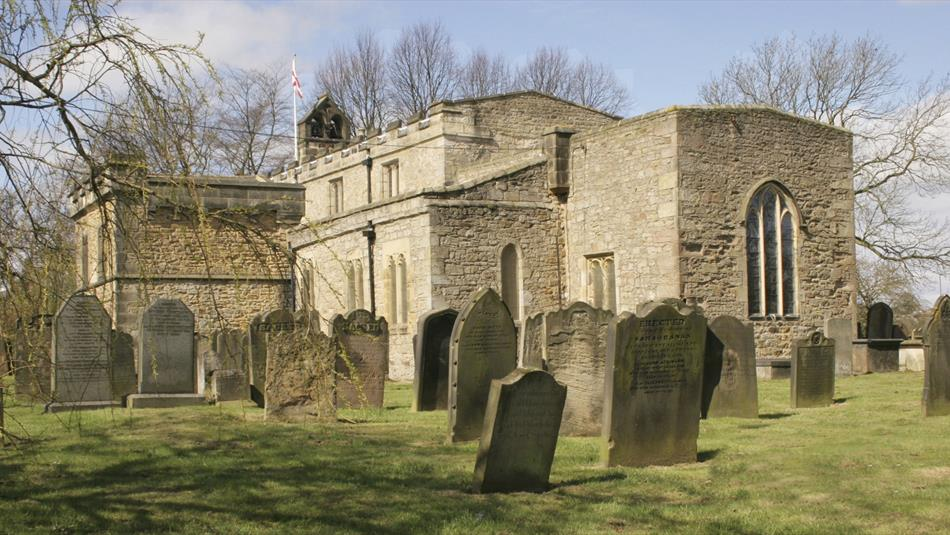

- Location within County Durham
- OS grid reference: NZ188269
- Unitary authority: County Durham
- Ceremonial county: Durham
- Region: North East
- Country: England
- Sovereign state: United Kingdom
- Post town: Darlington
- Postcode district: DL14
- Police: Durham
- Fire: County Durham and Darlington
- Ambulance: North East

St Helen Auckland or Saint Helen Auckland is a village in County Durham, England. It is south-west of Bishop Auckland. It is named after St. Helen in distinction from Bishop Auckland as the church is dedicated to her (the Church of St Helen, St Helen Auckland). In 1911 the civil parish had a population of 1373. On 1 April 1937 the parish was abolished and merged with Bishop Auckland and Etherley.

== Notable people ==
- Eden baronets
  - Sir John Eden, 2nd Bt
