= St Helen's Church, Lundy =

Anglican church on the island of Lundy, Devon, England

Saint Helen's Church
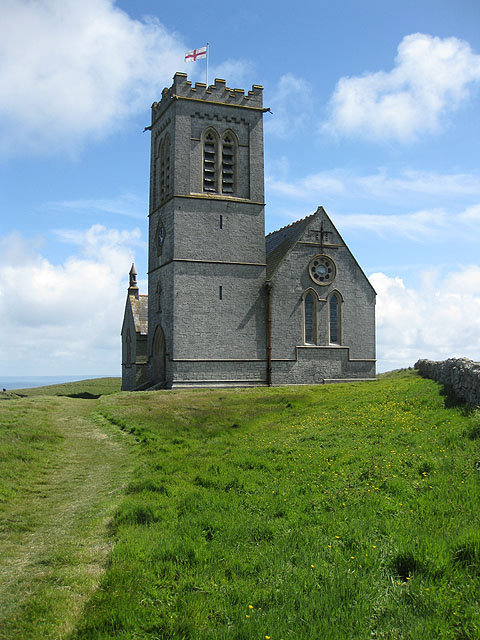
- View from the north-east

- Location within Devon
- 51°09′52″N 04°39′53″W
- Location: Lundy, Devon, England

History
- Built: 1896

Site notes
- Architect: John Norton
- Architectural style: Gothic Revival

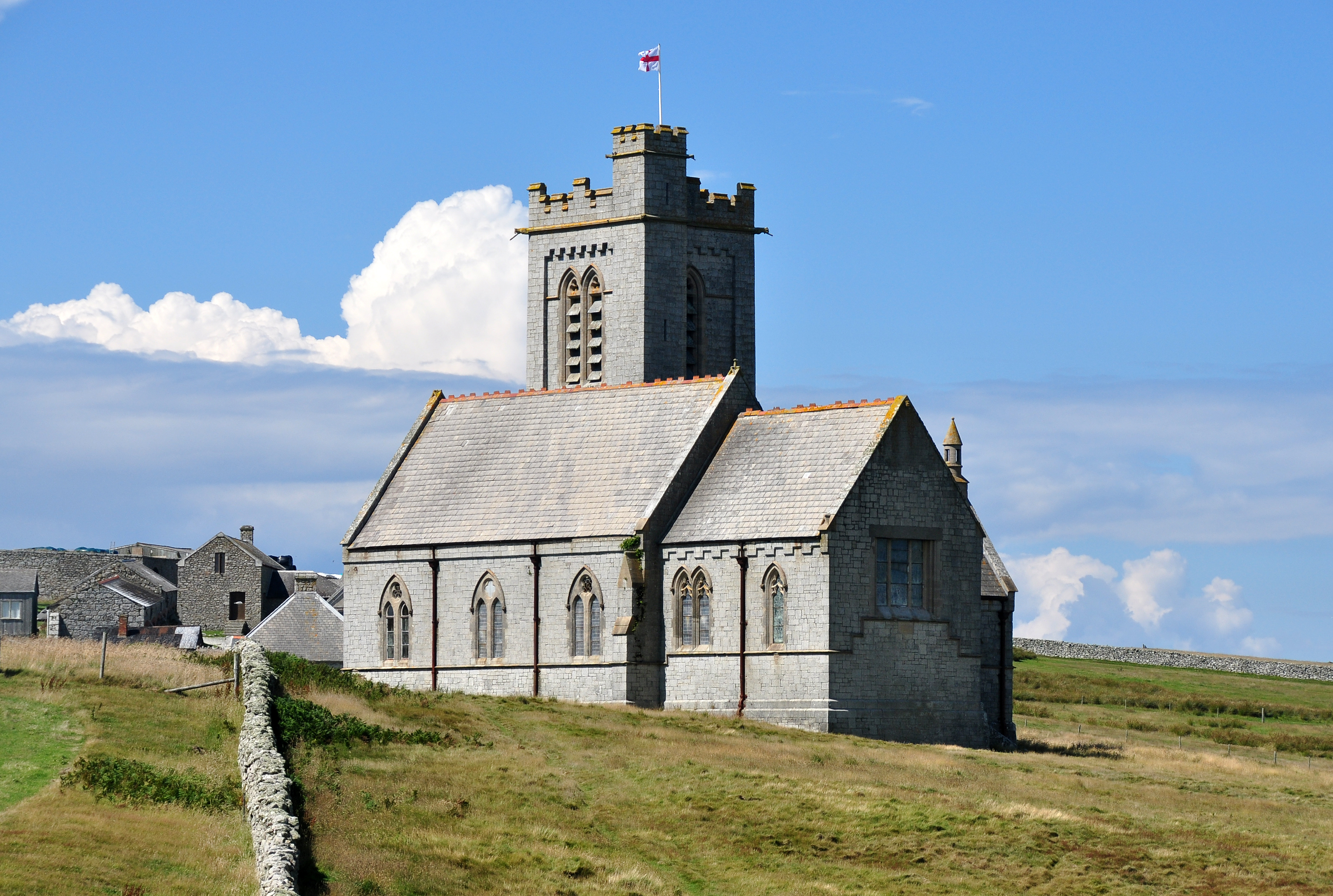
View from the south

Saint Helen's Church, also often incorrectly known as Saint Helena's Church, is an Anglican parish church on the 445 ha (1,100 acres) island of Lundy, lying at the mouth of the Bristol Channel, 19 km (12 mi) off the north coast, and part of the county, of Devon in England. As there is no resident priest on the island, the church is only irregularly used to hold services, though it is open to visitors. It is part of the Diocese of Exeter.

== History ==
The site was originally just a burial ground with memorial stones dating from between the 5th and 8th centuries. The church was started in 1244 as 'The Church of the island' but with no official name (Calendar of Liberate Rolls, 15.04.1244). A single reference to the site is known to exist as "Church of St Mary" in 1254. A small chapel on the island, probably founded in the 12th or 13th century, was dedicated to Saint Elena; it fell into disrepair by the 17th century. A temporary corrugated iron structure was dedicated to Saint Helen in 1885. The present square-towered stone church was built in the mid-1890s by the Reverend Hudson Grosett Heaven, financed by an 1895 bequest from Sarah Langworthy, born Sarah Heaven, of the Heaven family which owned Lundy from 1834 to 1918. The church was designed by eminent Victorian architect John Norton, completed in 1896 and consecrated on 17 June 1897 by Edward Bickersteth, the Bishop of Exeter.

== Construction ==
The NW-SE orientation of the church does not conform to the usual east–west alignment, possibly a result of a deep bed of clay found at the site when the foundations were laid. It is largely built of local granite ashlar blocks derived from ruined cottages on the island. The tower is about 23 m in height. The cost of its construction was £4104/5/7, with architect's fees of £286/0/8.

== Affiliation ==
The parish of Lundy was created in December 2013 and St Helen's is its parish church. Before then, St Helen's was an "extra parochial place", meaning that Lundy did not fall within the boundaries of any ecclesiastical parish (Lundy is still not part of any civil parish). The parish is part of the Hartland Coast Mission Community benefice. The church and island are part of the Deanery of Hartland, the Archdeaconry of Barnstaple, and the Diocese of Exeter.

== Description ==
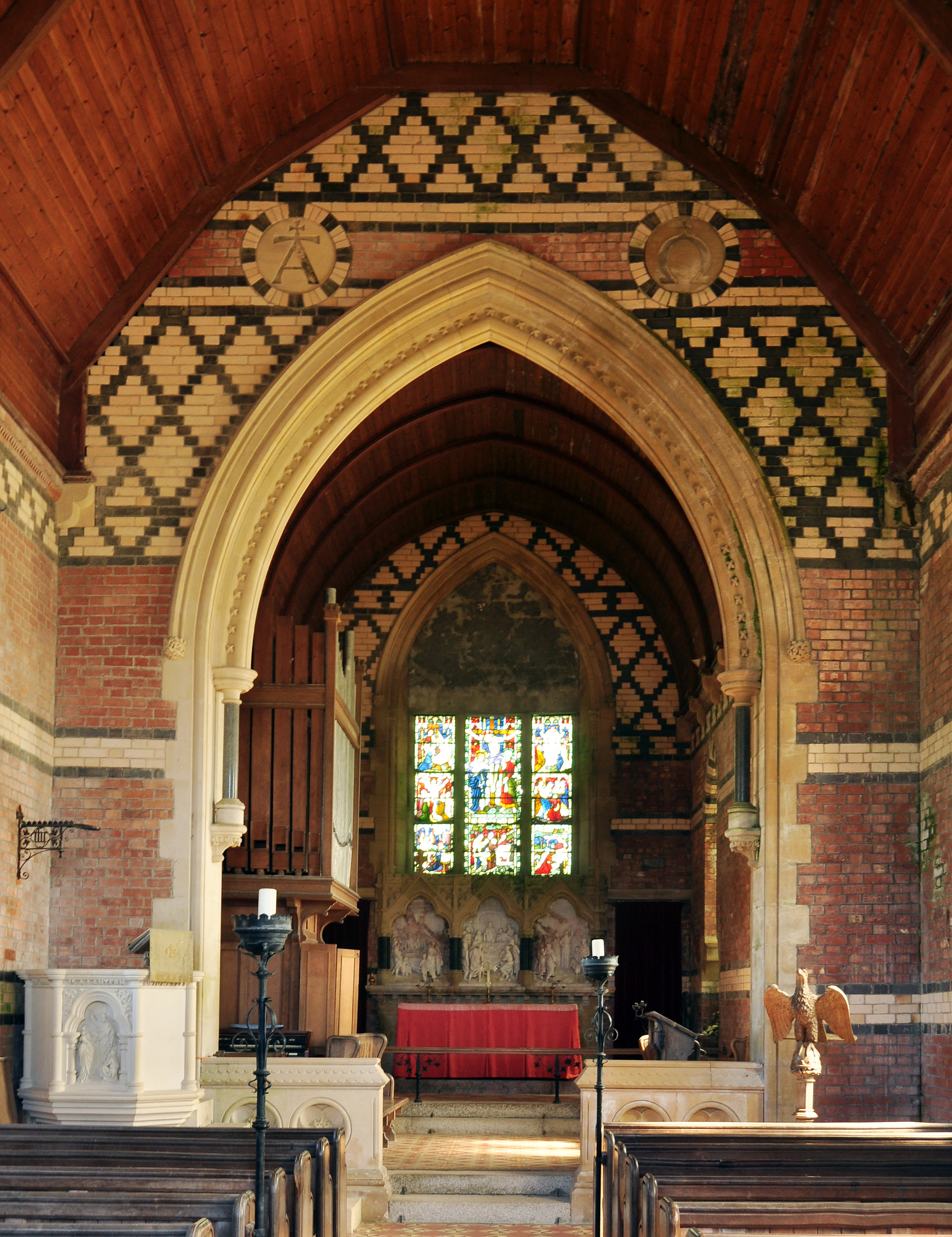
Interior view towards south-east end, prior to the east window's restoration in 2018

The slate roof has crested ridge tiles and stone coped gable ends. The tower, with an adjoining square stair turret, has battlements, gargoyles at the corners and lancet bell-openings with trefoil heads and slate louvres. There is a clock face above a niche containing a figure of Saint Helen (bearing an inscription of the Latin form, Helena), over the chamfered, wooden-gated, arch doorway to the porch.

The interior comprises a nave with a porch beneath the tower, and a chancel, with a transept vestry on the north side. The interior walls are of polychrome brick, red with black and white bands and diapering. The chancel arch is of moulded stone dogtooth decoration with colonnettes on corbels supporting the capitals. The reredos is arched on Purbeck marble colonnettes with alabaster carving depicting the Last Supper. The east window and rose window at the west end contain stained glass.

Other features of the church include a piscina and sedile, an altar rail with wrought iron standards, a low stone screen, carved stone pulpit and square font. There are ornate wrought iron lamp brackets on the north and south walls of the nave and a pipe organ on the south side of the chancel. It is furnished with benches, which include choir stalls, and a carved wooden eagle lectern.

=== Bells ===
A ring of eight bells installed in 1897 cost an additional £425/18/6. From the late 1920s the bells became unsafe and fell into disuse; in the 1950s they were removed from the tower and stored in the porch. They were eventually refurbished and restored to the tower in working order in July 1994. In 2004 an additional two trebles, cast by John Taylor & Co. were added to complete the ring of ten bells. They are widely used by visiting ringers to the island.

== St Helen's Centre ==
In 2018, a ten-year plan to restore the building and improve facilities within it was completed to create the St Helen's Centre. It was a joint venture by the Church of England, the Landmark Trust, the National Trust, the Lundy Field Society and the Lundy Island Society of Change Ringers. The National Lottery gave a grant of almost £1 million towards the restoration of the church and creation of the centre. As well as its role as a church, the St. Helen's Centre provides the island with a base for study of the island; space for exhibitions and lectures; and a refuge in poor weather.

== St Helena ==
As previously mentioned, the tower bears a niche containing a figure of Saint Helen. The inscription under the figure says "Sancta Helena". All official documentation, for instance the petition and sentence of consecration, give the name of the church as "Saint Helen Lundy Island" (now in the parish of Lundy). Helena is the Latin form of the name Helen. In the early part of the twentieth century several newspaper articles, by journalists who had visited the island, gave the name of the church as St Helena - presumably after seeing the inscription on the tower - and other writers started using the name, resulting in the error being repeated in academic books and journals and even official documentation.
