= Church of St Helen, St Helen Auckland =

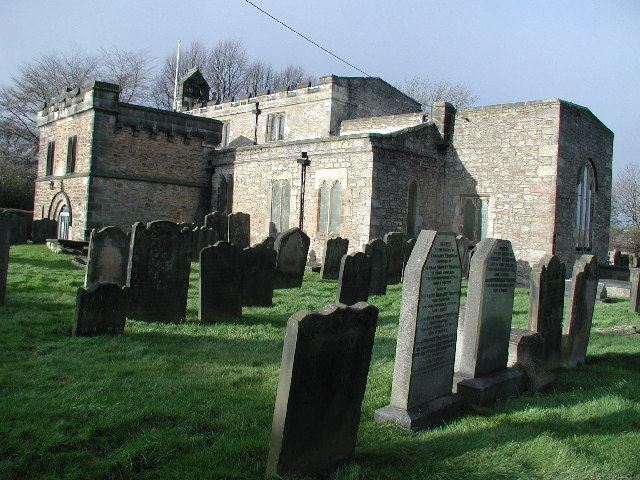
- The church and graveyard
- Church of St Helen, St Helen Auckland
- 54°38′09″N 1°42′35″W
- OS grid reference: NZ 18835 26773
- Location: Manor Road, St Helen Auckland, County Durham, DL14 9EN
- Country: England
- Denomination: Church of England
- Churchmanship: Traditional Catholic
- Website: http://www.sthelenschurch.co.uk/

History
- Status: Active

Architecture
- Functional status: Parish church
- Heritage designation: Grade I listed

Administration
- Diocese: Diocese of Durham
- Archdeaconry: Archdeaconry of Auckland
- Deanery: Auckland
- Parish: St. Helen Auckland

Clergy
- Bishop: Rt Revd Stephen Race SSC (AEO)
- Vicar: The Rev'd Canon Robert McTeer SSC

The Church of St Helen is a Church of England parish church in St Helen Auckland, County Durham. It is a Grade I listed building.

== History ==
The church dates to the late 12th century and early 13th century. The oldest surviving part of the church, the two easternmost bays of the nave, were built in 1120. A low-pitched roof was added when the roof was rebuilt in the 15th century. At the turn of the 16th century, a clerestory and battlements were built. The original door to the church remains, making it "one of the oldest doors in England".

On 21 April 1952, the church was designated a grade I listed building.

In 2001, a restoration of the church took place. This involved renewing the floor, replacing the fixed pews with new movable ones, limewashing the walls, and repointing masonry. It cost £170,000.

=== Present day ===
The Parish of St. Helen Auckland is part of the Archdeaconry of Auckland in the Diocese of Durham.

The parish stands in the Traditional Catholic tradition of the Church of England. As the parish rejects the ordination of women, it receives alternative episcopal oversight from the Bishop of Beverley (currently Stephen Race), and it is affiliated with The Society.

== Gallery ==
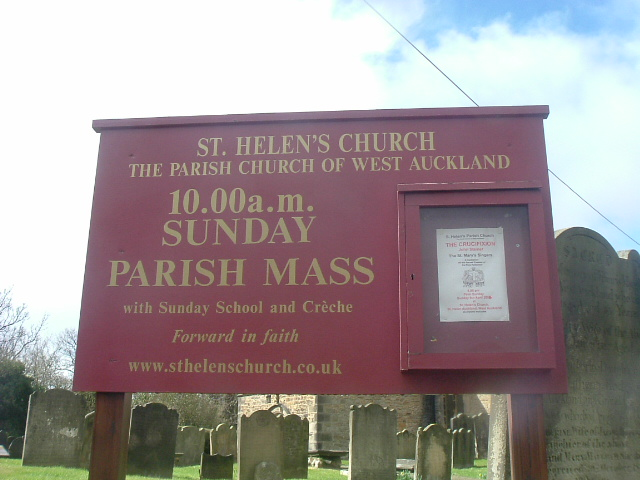
Noticeboard

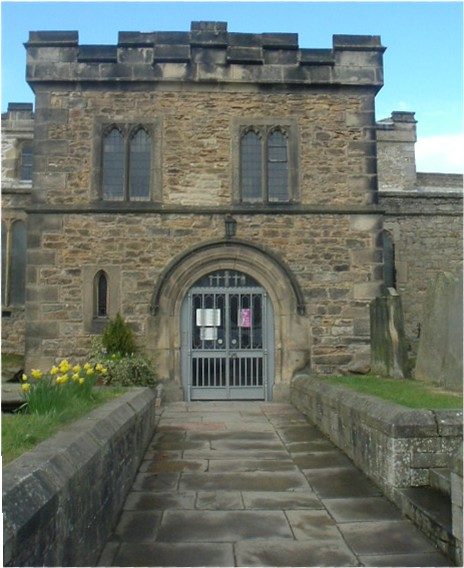
Entrance
