= George Villiers, 2nd Duke of Buckingham =

English statesman and poet

His Grace The Duke of Buckingham KG PC FRS
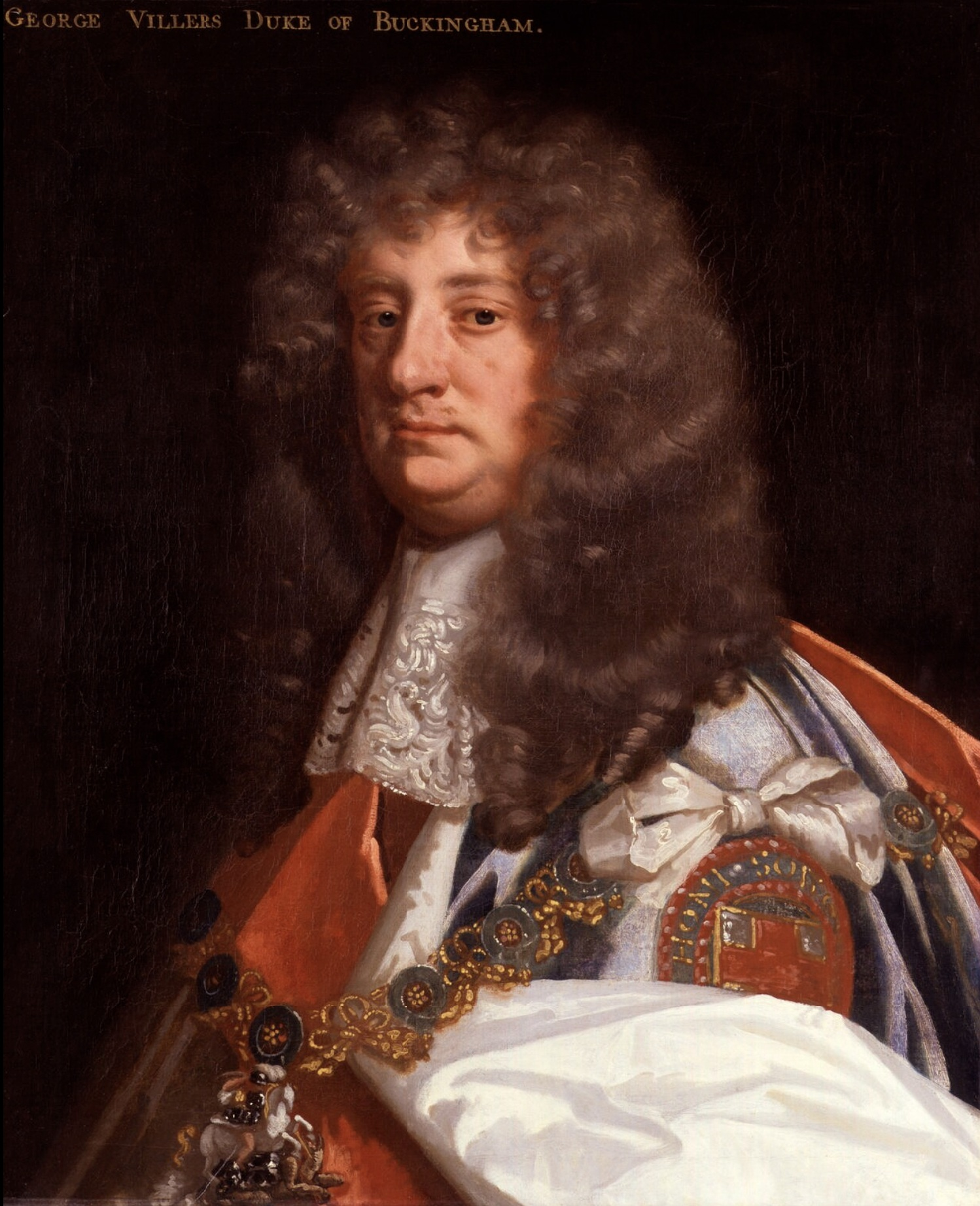
- Portrait by Sir Peter Lely, c. 1675

Personal details
- Born: 30 January 1628
- Died: 16 April 1687 (aged 59)
- Spouse: Mary Fairfax
- Parents: George Villiers, 1st Duke of Buckingham; Katherine Manners, Baroness de Ros

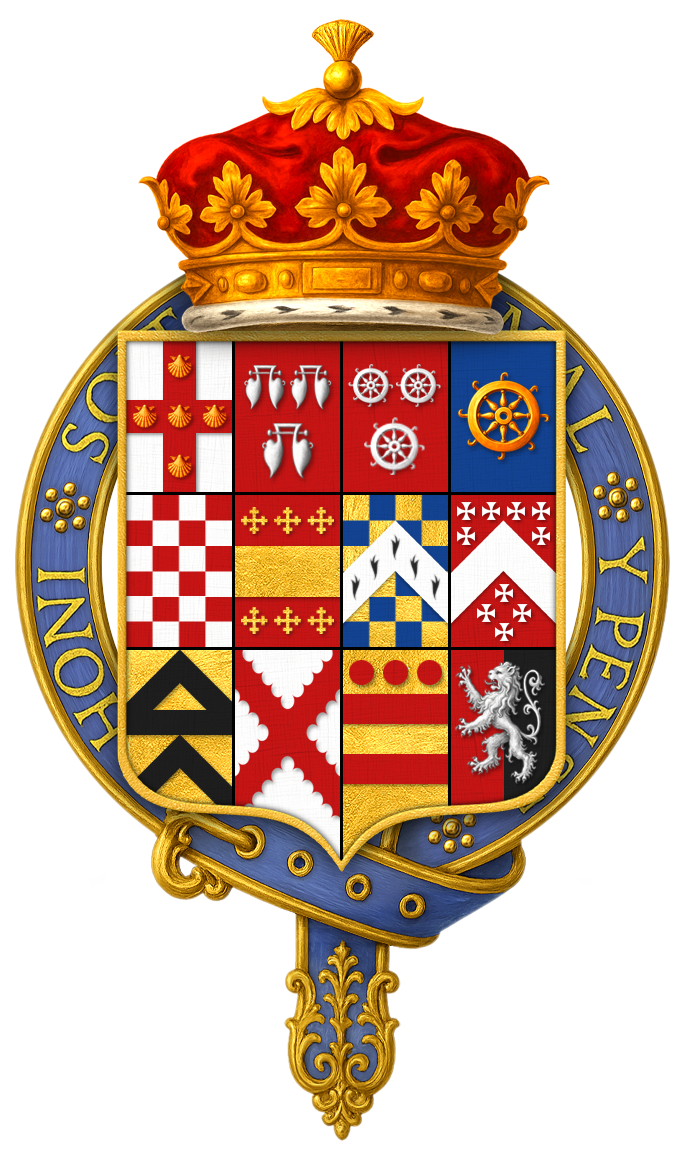
Quartered arms of George Villiers, 2nd Duke of Buckingham, KG (based on Buckingham's Garter stall plate in St. George's chapel)

George Villiers, 2nd Duke of Buckingham, 19th Baron de Ros (30 January 1628 – 16 April 1687) was an English statesman and poet who exerted considerable political power during the reign of Charles II of England.

A Royalist during the English Civil War, in 1651 he joined Charles II's court-in-exile in France. He returned to England in 1657 after a disagreement with the king, but subsequently supported the Stuart Restoration in 1660. Buckingham was imprisoned by Charles on several occasions before rising to be one of his most influential advisors, becoming a key member of the Cabal ministry in 1668. In 1674 he was dismissed and joined the opposition.

He was restored to the king's favour in 1684, but took no major part in public life after the accession of James II a year later. Buckingham had a lifelong interest in science and poetry, and was the author of several satires and plays.

== Life ==
=== Early life ===
George was the son of George Villiers, 1st Duke of Buckingham, favourite of James I and Charles I, and his wife Katherine Manners. He was only seven months old when his father was assassinated at Portsmouth by the disaffected officer John Felton. Subsequently, he was brought up in the royal household of Charles I, together with his younger brother Francis and the King's own children, the future Charles II and James II. He was educated at Trinity College, Cambridge, where he obtained the degree of Master of Arts in 1642. For a time he was taught geometry by Thomas Hobbes. During this time he was also acquainted with George Aglionby, whose influence he later accredited with persuading him to follow the English King in the Civil War.

=== Involvement in the English Civil War ===
In the Civil War he fought for the King, and took part in Prince Rupert of the Rhine's attack on Lichfield Close in April 1643.

Under the care of the Earl of Northumberland, George and his brother travelled abroad and lived in Florence and Rome. When the Second English Civil War broke out they joined Royalists under the command of Henry Rich, 1st Earl of Holland in Surrey, in July 1648.

Holland scraped together a small force of 600 men and appointed Buckingham as his General of the Horse. This force was scattered after a minor engagement near Kingston upon Thames in which Buckingham's brother Francis was killed. Buckingham himself escaped after a heroic stand against six Roundhead opponents, his back against an oak tree, which became the stuff of Cavalier legend. After another doomed combat at St Neots the Duke succeeded in escaping to the Netherlands.

=== Exile with Charles II ===
Because of his participation in the Civil War, his lands, which had been restored to him in 1647 on account of his youth, were confiscated and given to his future father-in-law, Thomas, Lord Fairfax. On 19 September 1649, Charles II conferred on him the Order of the Garter (KG) and admitted him to his Privy Council on 6 April 1650.

In opposition to Hyde, Buckingham supported the alliance with the Scottish Presbyterians, accompanied Charles to Scotland in June, and allied himself with the Marquess of Argyll, dissuading Charles from joining the Royalist plot of October 1650, and being suspected of betraying the plan to the covenanting leaders. That May, he had been appointed general of the eastern association in England, and was sent to raise forces abroad; the following year, he was chosen to lead the projected movement in Lancashire and to command the Scottish royalists. He fought alongside Charles at the Battle of Worcester on 3 September 1651, but escaped alone to Rotterdam in October.

His subsequent negotiations with Oliver Cromwell's government, and his readiness to sacrifice the interests of the church, separated him from the rest of Charles's advisers and diminished his influence. His estrangement from the royal family was completed by his audacious courtship of the king's widowed sister Mary, Princess of Orange, and by a money dispute with Charles.

=== Return and imprisonment ===
In 1657, he returned to England, and on 15 September married Mary, daughter of Anne and Thomas Fairfax, 3rd Lord Fairfax of Cameron, who had fallen in love with him although the banns of her intended marriage with Philip Stanhope, 2nd Earl of Chesterfield were being called in church. Buckingham was soon suspected of organizing a Presbyterian plot against the government. An order was issued for his arrest on 9 October, despite Fairfax's interest with Cromwell. He was placed under house arrest at York House in April 1658, escaped, and was rearrested on 18 August. He was then imprisoned in the Tower of London until his mother and father-in-law negotiated his release on 23 February 1659. He was freed after promising not to assist the enemies of the government, and on Fairfax's security of £20,000. He joined Fairfax in his march against General John Lambert in January 1660, and afterwards claimed to have gained Fairfax to the cause of the Restoration.

=== After the Restoration ===
The returning King Charles at first received Buckingham (who met him at his landing at Dover) coldly, but Buckingham was soon back in favour. He was appointed a Gentleman of the Bedchamber, carried the Sovereign's Orb at the coronation on 23 April 1661, and was made Lord Lieutenant of the West Riding of Yorkshire on 21 September. The same year, he accompanied Princess Henrietta to Paris to marry the Duke of Orleans, but made such shameless advances to her that he was recalled. On 28 April 1662, he was admitted to the privy council. His confiscated estates, amounting to £26,000 a year, were restored to him, and he was said to be the king's richest subject. He helped suppress the projected insurrection in Yorkshire in 1663, went to sea in the Second Anglo-Dutch War in 1665, and took measures to resist the Dutch or French invasion in June 1666.

He was, however, debarred from high office by the influence of Edward Hyde, 1st Earl of Clarendon, the Chancellor. Buckingham now plotted to effect the Chancellor's ruin. He organized parties in both Houses of Parliament to support the Importation Act 1667 prohibiting the import of Irish cattle, partly to oppose Clarendon and partly to thwart the Duke of Ormonde. Having asserted during the debates that "whoever was against the bill had either an Irish interest or an Irish understanding", he was challenged to a duel by Ormonde's son Lord Ossory. Buckingham avoided the encounter, and Ossory was sent to the Tower. A short time afterwards, during a conference between the two Houses on 19 December, he came to blows with the Marquess of Dorchester: Buckingham pulled off the marquess's periwig, and Dorchester also "had much of the duke's hair in his hand". According to Clarendon, no misdemeanour so flagrant had ever before offended the dignity of the House of Lords. The offending peers were both sent to the Tower, but were released after apologising; and Buckingham vented his spite by raising a claim to the title of Baron Ros, held by Dorchester's son-in-law. His opposition to the government had lost him the king's favour, and he was now accused of treasonable intrigues, and of having cast the king's horoscope. His arrest was ordered on 25 February 1667, and he was dismissed from all his offices. He avoided capture until 27 June, when he gave himself up and was imprisoned in the Tower.

Members of the Cabal ministry

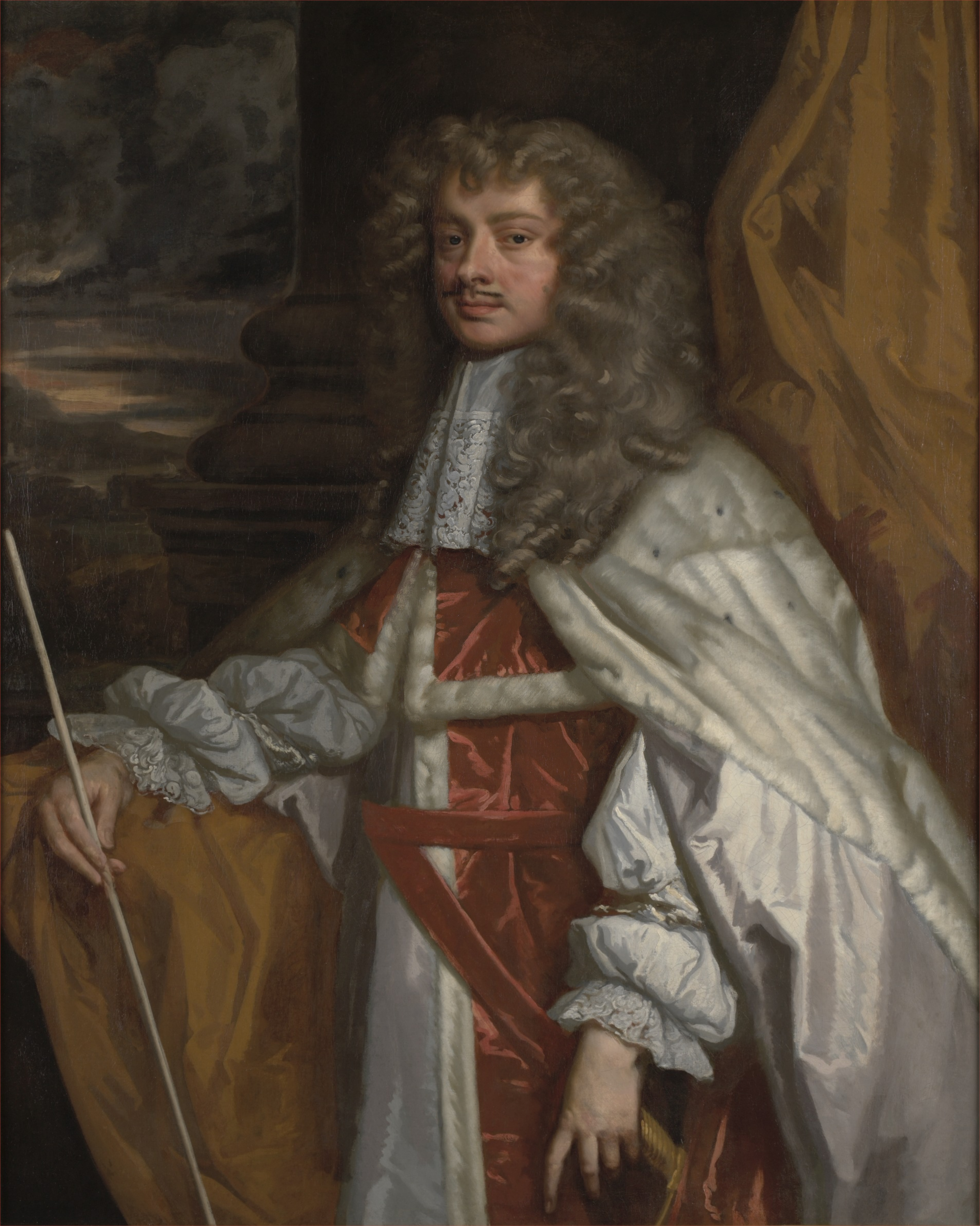
Thomas Clifford, 1st Baron Clifford of Chudleigh
(1630–1673).

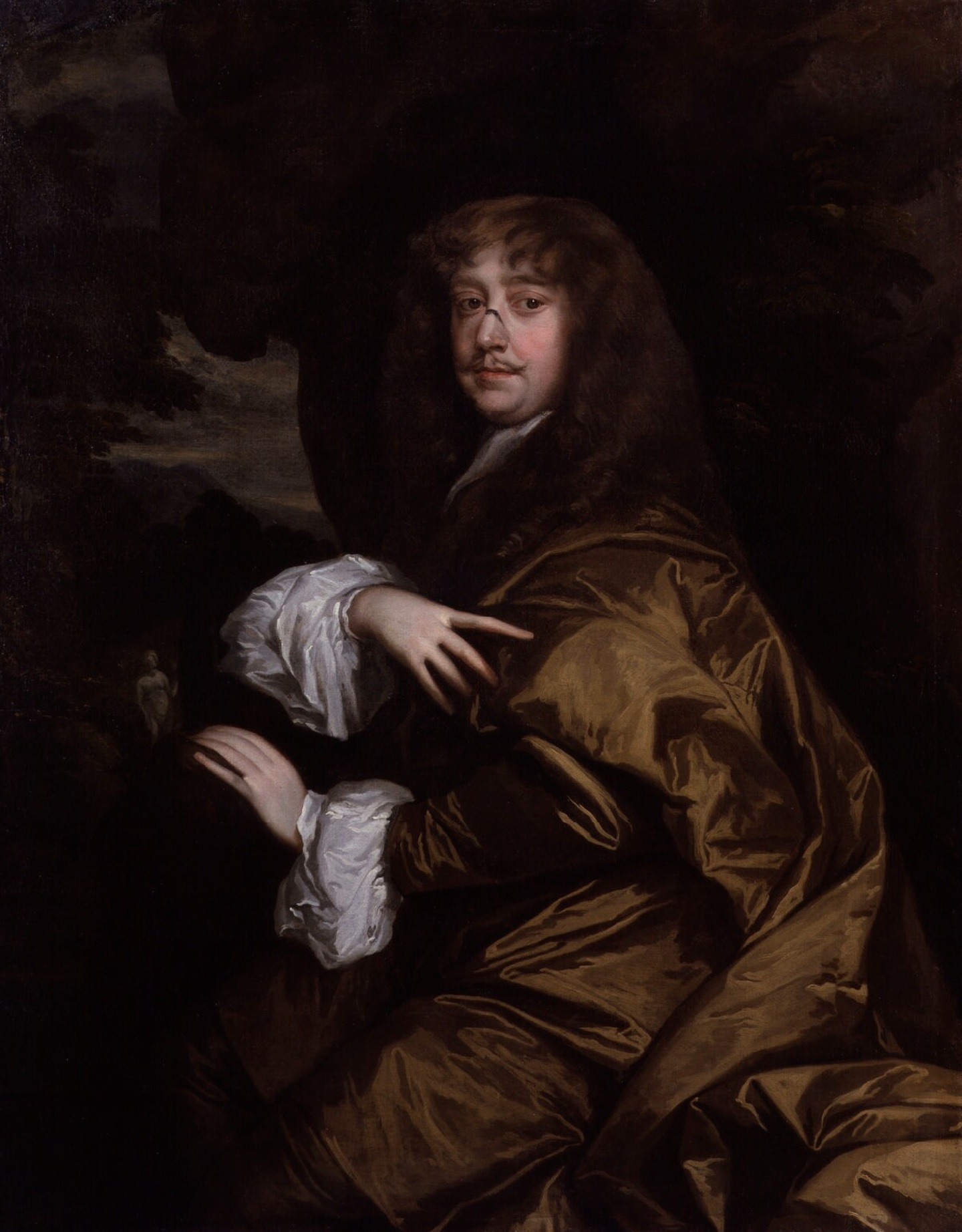
Henry Bennet, 1st Earl of Arlington
(1618–1685).

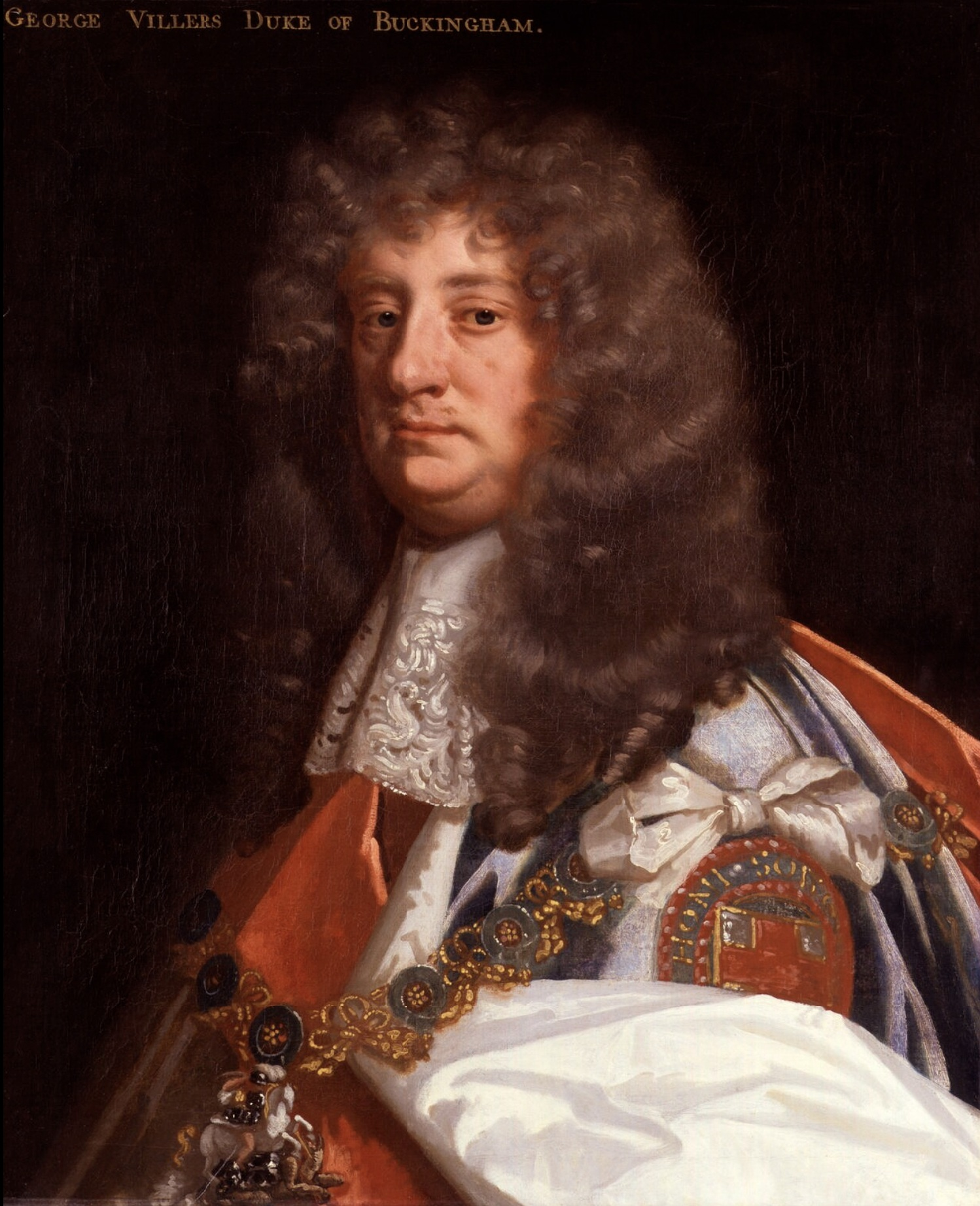
George Villiers, 2nd Duke of Buckingham (1628–1687).

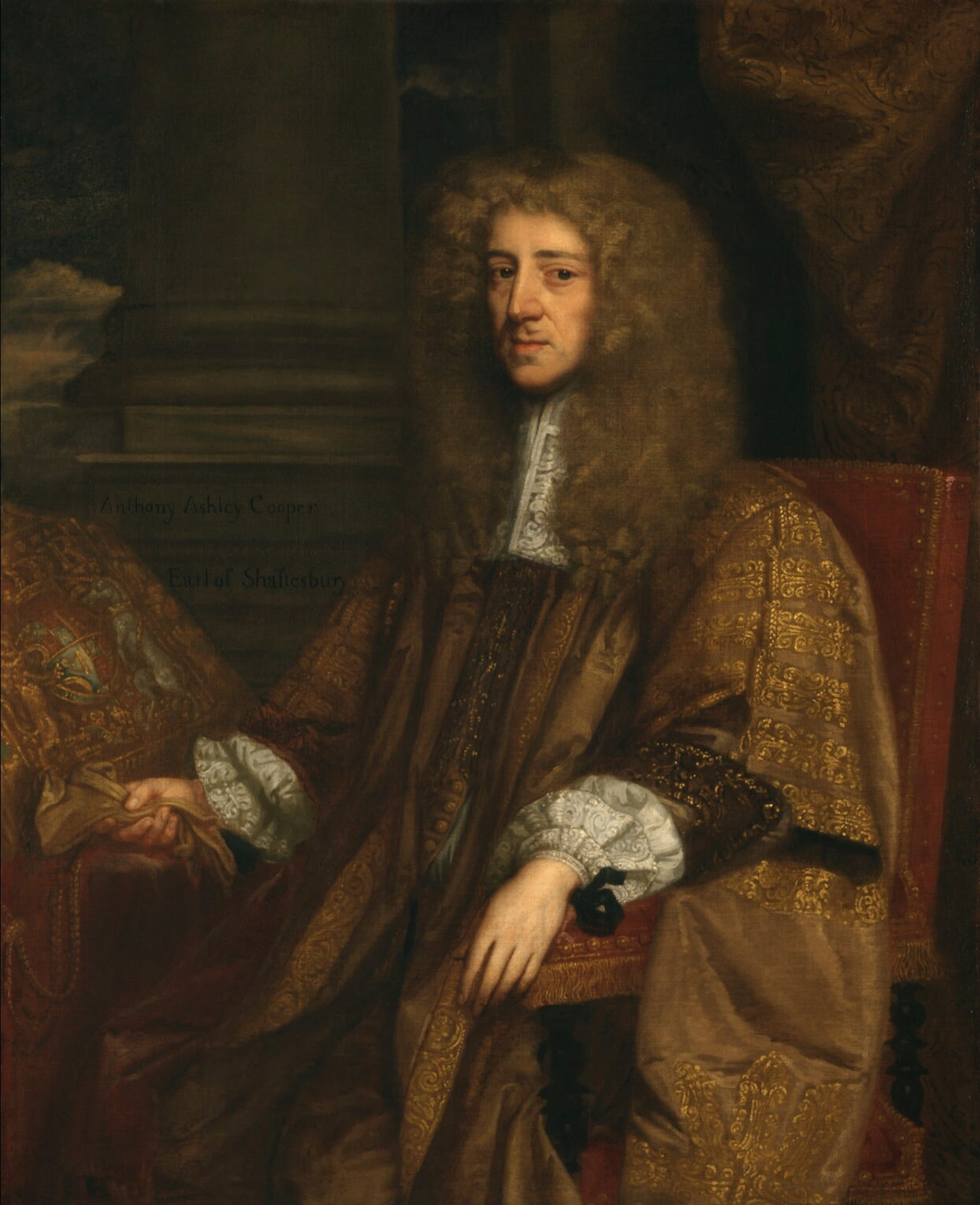
Anthony Ashley Cooper, 1st Baron Ashley of Wimborne St Giles (1621–1683).

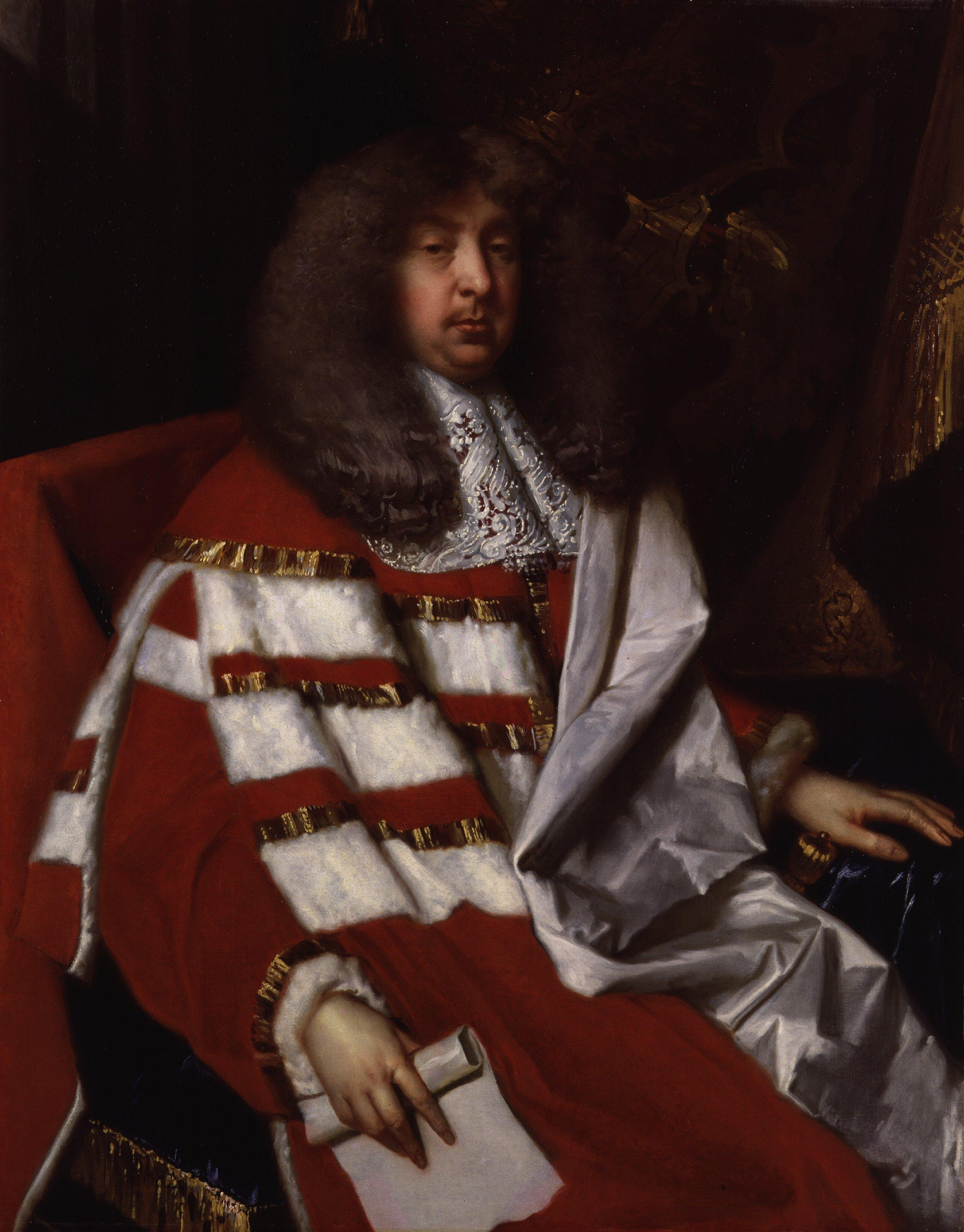
John Maitland, 1st Duke of Lauderdale (1616–1682).

He was released by 17 July, was restored to favour and to his appointments on 15 September, and took an active part in the prosecution of Clarendon. When Clarendon fell, he became the chief minister, even though he held no high office except that of Master of the Horse, bought from the Duke of Albemarle in 1668.

Villiers was a signatory to The Several Declarations of The Company of Royal Adventurers of England Trading into Africa, a document published in 1667 which led to the creation of the Royal Africa Company.

In 1671 he was elected chancellor of Cambridge, and in 1672 high steward of the University of Oxford. He favoured religious toleration, and earned the praise of Richard Baxter; he supported a scheme of comprehension in 1668, and advised the Royal Declaration of Indulgence in 1672. He upheld the original jurisdiction of the Lords in Skinner's Case. With these exceptions, Buckingham's tenure of office was chiefly marked by scandals and intrigues. His illicit connection with the Countess of Shrewsbury led to a duel with her husband the Earl at Barn Elms on 16 January 1668, in which the Earl was fatally wounded. The tale that the countess witnessed the encounter disguised as a page appears to have no foundation; but Buckingham provoked outrage when he installed the "widow of his own creation" in his own and his wife's house, and sent his wife to her father's house.

Buckingham was thought to be behind the idea of obtaining the divorce of the childless queen, Catherine of Braganza (though this never happened). He intrigued against James, Duke of York, against Sir William Coventry — one of the ablest statesmen of the time, whose fall he procured by provoking Coventry to send him a challenge — and against the Duke of Ormonde, who was dismissed in 1669. He was even suspected of having instigated Thomas Blood's attempt to kidnap and murder Ormonde, and was charged with the crime in the king's presence by Ormonde's son, Lord Ossory, who threatened to shoot him dead in the event of his father's meeting with a violent end. Arlington, next to Buckingham himself the most powerful member of the "Cabal" and a favourite of the king, was less easy to overcome; and he derived considerable influence from the control of foreign affairs entrusted to him. Buckingham always had been an adherent of the French alliance, while Arlington concluded through Sir William Temple the Triple Alliance of 1668. On the complete volte-face and surrender made by Charles to France in 1670, Arlington, a Catholic, was entrusted with the first Treaty of Dover of 20 May — which besides providing for the united attack on the Dutch Republic, included Charles's undertaking to proclaim himself a Catholic and to reintroduce the Catholic faith into England — while Buckingham was sent to France to carry on the sham negotiations which led to the public treaties of 31 December 1670 and 2 February 1672. He was much pleased with his reception by Louis XIV, declared that he had "more honours done him than ever were given to any subject", and, was presented with a pension of 10,000 livres a year for Lady Shrewsbury.

In June 1672, during the Third Anglo-Dutch War, he accompanied Arlington to Nieuwerbrug to impose terms on the Prince of Orange, and when these were refused with Arlington arranged a new treaty, the Accord of Heeswijk with Louis. After all this activity he suffered a keen disappointment in being passed over for the command of the newly formed Blackheath Army in favour of the Duke of Schomberg. Buckingham was given command of a regiment, but resented serving under Schomberg. He now knew of the secret treaty of Dover, and towards the end of 1673, his jealousy of Arlington became open hostility. He threatened to impeach him, and endeavoured with the help of Louis to stir up a faction against him in parliament.

=== Downfall ===
This, however, was unsuccessful, and in January 1674 both houses of Parliament attacked Buckingham. In the Lords, the trustees of the young Earl of Shrewsbury complained that Buckingham publicly continued his affair with the Countess, and that a son of theirs had been buried in Westminster Abbey with the title of Earl of Coventry; Buckingham and the countess were required to apologize and give security for £10,000 not to cohabit together again. In the House of Commons he was attacked as the promoter of the French alliance, of "popery" and arbitrary government. He defended himself chiefly by endeavouring to blame Arlington; but the house approved a petition to the king to remove Buckingham from his councils, presence and from employment forever. Charles, who had been waiting for a favourable opportunity, and who was enraged at Buckingham's disclosures, quickly consented.

Buckingham retired, reformed his ways, attended church with his wife, began to pay his debts, became a "patriot", and was claimed by the country or opposition party as one of their leaders. In the spring of 1675 he was conspicuous for his opposition to the Test Oath and for his abuse of the bishops, and on 16 November he introduced a bill for the relief of the nonconformists. On 15 February 1677 he was one of the four lords who tried to embarrass the government by raising the question of whether the parliament, not having assembled according to the act of Edward III once in the year, had not been dissolved by the recent prorogation. The motion was rejected and the four lords were ordered to apologize. When they refused, they were sent to the Tower, Buckingham, in particular, exasperating the House by ridiculing its censure. He was released in July, and immediately entered into intrigues with Paul Barillon, the French ambassador, with the object of hindering the grant of supplies to the king; and in 1678 he visited Paris to get the assistance of Louis XIV for the opposition's cause.

He took an active part in prosecuting those implicated in the supposed "Popish Plot", and accused the lord chief justice (Sir William Scroggs) in his own court while on circuit of favouring Catholics. Because of this, a writ was issued for his arrest, but it was never served. He promoted the return of Whig candidates to Parliament, constituted himself the champion of the dissenters, and was admitted a Freeman of the City of London. He, however, separated himself from the Whigs on the exclusion question, probably on account of his dislike of the Duke of Monmouth and the Earl of Shaftesbury, was absent from the great debate in the Lords on 15 November 1680, and was restored to the king's favour in 1684.

=== Retirement ===
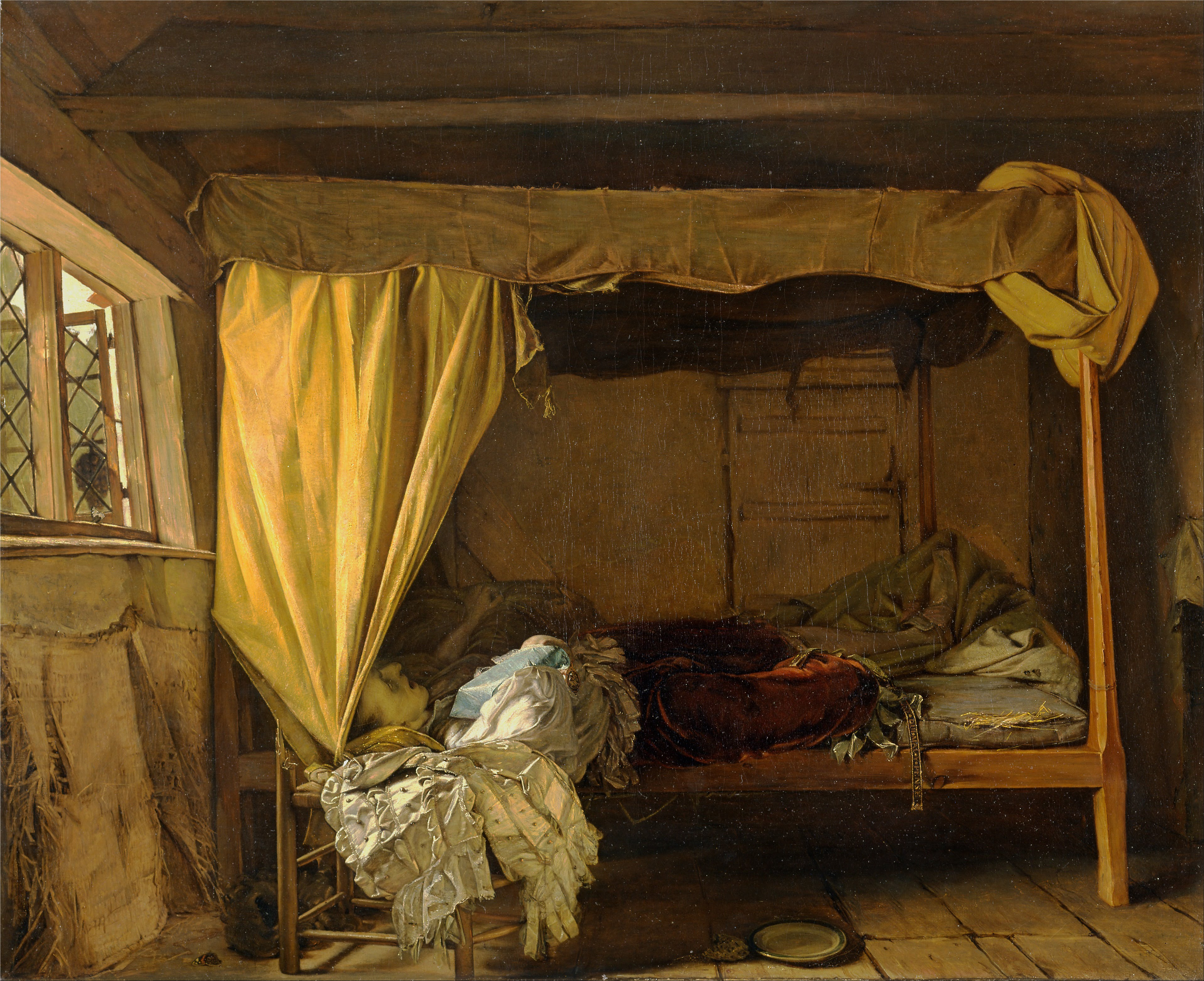
The Death of Buckingham by Victorian artist Augustus Egg. The scene of his death derives from the exaggerated account in Alexander Pope's Epistle to Bathurst: In the worst inn's worst room, with mat half-hung, The floors of plaster, and the walls of dung, On once a flock-bed, but repaired with straw, With tape-tied curtains never meant to draw, The George and Garter dangling from that bed Where tawdry yellow strove with dirty red.

He took no part in public life after James II's accession, but returned to his manor of Helmsley in Yorkshire, probably because of poor health and exhausted finances. In 1685 he published a pamphlet, entitled A short Discourse on the Reasonableness of Man's having a Religion in which after discussing the main subject he returned to his favourite topic, religious toleration. The tract provoked some rejoinders and was defended, amongst others, by William Penn, and by the author himself in The Duke of Buckingham's Letter to the unknown author of a short answer to the Duke of Buckingham's Paper (1685). In hopes of converting him to Catholicism, James sent him a priest, but Buckingham ridiculed his arguments. He died on 16 April 1687, from a chill caught while hunting, in the house of a tenant in Kirkbymoorside in Yorkshire (it is known as Buckingham House and it is located in the town centre), expressing great repentance and feeling himself "despised by my country and I fear forsaken by my God".

The miserable picture of his end drawn by Alexander Pope is greatly exaggerated. Buckingham was buried on 7 June 1687 in Henry VII's chapel in Westminster Abbey, with greater splendour than the late king. With his death, the family founded by the extraordinary rise to power and influence of the first duke ended. As he left no legitimate children, the title became extinct, and his great estate was completely dissipated; of the enormous mansion he constructed at Cliveden in Buckinghamshire only the arcaded terrace remains.

== Character ==
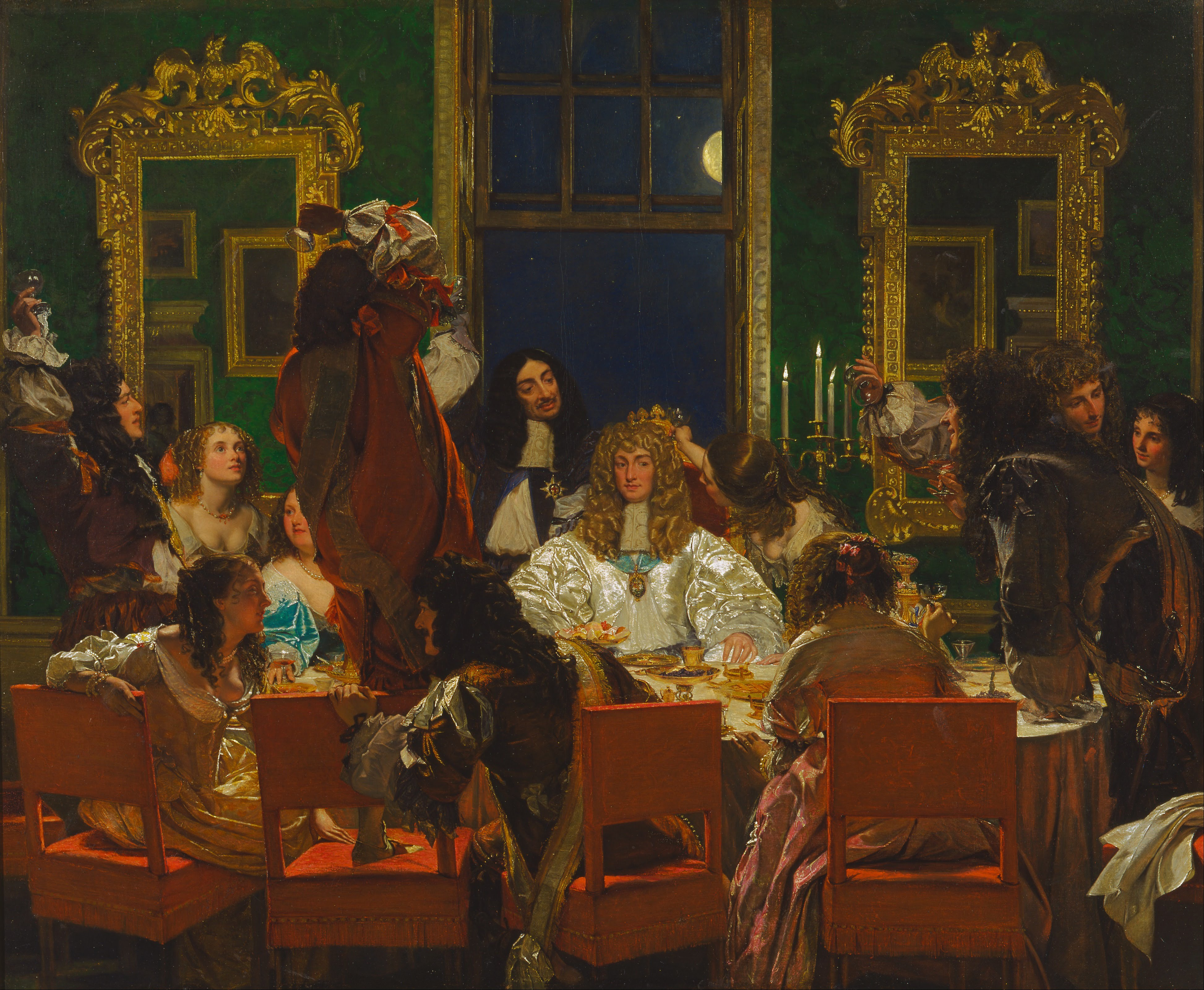
The Life and Death of Buckingham: The Life of Buckingham, c. 1855, by Augustus Egg

Buckingham was one of the archetypal Restoration rakes, part of the "Merry Gang" of courtiers whose other members included John Wilmot, 2nd Earl of Rochester, Sir Charles Sedley, Charles Sackville, 6th Earl of Dorset, and the playwrights William Wycherley (of whom Buckingham was the patron) and George Etherege. Following the tone set by the monarch himself, these men distinguished themselves in drinking, sex and witty conversation. Buckingham is often judged ostentatious, licentious, and unscrupulous, the "Alcibiades of the seventeenth century". One story, or legend, saw Buckingham invite a man to a pub in Newmarket to distract him while his friend Rochester sneaked into the man's home, drugged his sister, robbed the house, seduced his wife, and then brought his wife to the pub so that Buckingham could also have sex with her. The woman's husband later committed suicide.

However, even the duke's critics agree that he was good-humoured, good-natured, generous, an unsurpassed mimic, and the leader of fashion. His good looks and amusing wit made him irresistible to his contemporaries, in spite of his moral faults and even crimes. A contemporary observer at the Court of Charles II found him: "Courteous, affable, generous, magnanimous...he is adored by the people....On the other hand he is an atheist, blasphemer, violent, cruel and infamous for his licentiousness, in which he is so wrapped up that there is no sex, nor age, nor condition of persons who are spared from it". His portrait has been drawn by Burnet, Count Hamilton in the Memoires de Grammont, John Dryden, Alexander Pope in the Epistle to Lord Bathurst, and Sir Walter Scott in Peveril of the Peak. John Reresby calls him "the first gentleman of person and wit I think I ever saw", and Gilbert Burnet bears the same testimony. Dean Lockier, after alluding to his unrivalled skill in riding, dancing and fencing, adds, "When he came into the presence-chamber it was impossible for you not to follow him with your eye as he went along, he moved so gracefully". Racing and hunting were his favourite sports, and his name long survived in the hunting songs of Yorkshire.

The Duke was also the patron of Abraham Cowley, Thomas Sprat and Matthew Clifford. He dabbled in chemistry and set up the Vauxhall glassworks at Lambeth (see below). John Dryden described him under the character of Zimri in lines in the poem Absalom and Achitophel (to which Buckingham replied in Poetical Reflections on a late Poem ... by a Person of Honour, 1682):

A man so various that he seemed to be/Not one, but all mankind's epitome;/Stiff in opinions, always in the wrong,/Was everything by starts and nothing long;/But, in the course of one revolving moon/Was chymist, fiddler, statesman and buffoon../..Beggar'd by fools, whom still he found too late,/He had his jest, but they had his estate.

"He saw and approved the best", says Brian Fairfax, "but did too often deteriora sequi (Latin: "follow the worst")". Buckingham himself wrote "Methinks, I see the wanton houres flee, And as they passe, turne back and laugh at me"; his last recorded words, "O! what a prodigal have I been of that most valuable of all possessions — Time!"

== Works ==
Buckingham wrote occasional verses, pamphlets, lampoons, satires and plays showing undoubted (but undeveloped) poetic gifts, a collection of which, containing however many pieces not from his pen, was first published by Tom Brown in 1704; while a few extracts from a commonplace book of Buckingham of some interest are given in an article in the Quarterly Review of January 1898. He was the author of The Rehearsal, an amusing and clever satire on the heroic drama and especially on Dryden's The Conquest of Granada (first performed on 7 December 1671, at the Theatre Royal, and first published in 1672), a deservedly popular play which was imitated by Henry Fielding in Tom Thumb the Great, and by Sheridan in The Critic. It is believed that Samuel Butler had a hand in it. Dryden had his revenge in his picture of Buckingham as Zimri in Absalom and Achitophel. Buckingham also published two adapted plays: a version of John Fletcher's The Chances (1682) and The Restoration or Right will take place, from Beaumont and Fletcher's Philaster (publ. 1714); and also The Battle of Sedgmoor and The Militant Couple (publ. 1704). The latest edition of his works is that by T. Evans (2 vols. 8vo, 1775). Another work is named by Wood, A Demonstration of the Deity, of which there is now no trace.

== Scientific interests ==
The Duke had a lifelong interest in science, acquired during the civil war, while he was exiled in France. There, he carried out a variety of laboratory experiments assisted by Prince Charles (the future Charles II). He was especially interested in alchemy, and hoped to find a method of producing the philosopher's stone This obsession with alchemy continued throughout his lifetime; his frequent absences from court, mistakenly attributed to visits to a lover were, very often, periods when the Duke was engrossed in his experiments.

During his lifetime, Buckingham set up a number of laboratories, where he would carry out his experiments. The first was a purpose - built facility in the grounds of Fairfax Hall, which he had acquired through his marriage to Mary Fairfax, the daughter of Lord Fairfax. He also had a laboratory installed in Wallingord House, in Westminster, a property which was restored to him after the restoration of the monarchy. Later in life, when he was out of favour at court, he retired back to Fairfax Hall to pursue his favourite pastimes, hunting and working in his laboratory. Later still, when he was sent to the Tower, accused of treason, he was permitted to set up his own private laboratory, so he could continue with his experiments.

In addition to his personal interests, Buckingham was also involved with the wider scientific activities of the time. He was appointed a fellow of the Royal Society on 15 May 1661. The society listed his specialist expertise as "Chemical". The duke maintained a regular but low-level interest in the society. For example, he was requested by the society to instruct his chemist to distil charcoal for the society's weekly experiments and to supply a sample of unicorn horn for investigation by the members. Later, on 4 December 1666, the Earl of Northampton and the Bishop of Exeter were tasked with asking the Duke to accommodate the society with some rooms in York House, Strand.

The Duke had other scientific activities including his frequent visits to the king's own laboratory, which was situated in Whitehall, where he would observe the experiments and dissections in the company of the king. Also, Buckingham acquired the Vauxhall Glassworks and enlarged the factory there. Evelyn, in his diary on 19 September 1676, praised the quality of its products. However, unlike king Charles, he showed no interest in botany. John Evelyn, visiting Cliveden House (which Brian Fairfax considered to be one of Buckingham's expensive Substructiones Insanae), on 23 July 1679, was disappointed to find a garden containing mainly ferns.

Unfortunately, the many hours the Duke spent in his laboratories damaged his health, so that later in life he showed the symptoms of mercury poisoning.

== Legacy ==
Like his father, the younger Duke makes an appearance in Alexandre Dumas' "Musketeer" novels. The Vicomte de Bragelonne (1847) sees him escorting Charles II's sister, Henrietta, to France to be married to Philippe I, Duke of Orléans. He is soon smitten with the young lady, which Philippe perceives quickly, and appeals to his mother, Anne of Austria. Anne, whose love for Villiers Senior was chronicled in The Three Musketeers (1844), convinces him that it would be best for French-English relations if he returned home. While in France, however, he earns the enmity of Comte de Wardes, whose father was the lover of Milady de Winter, who was responsible for the old Villiers' death. De Wardes escorts him to a boat destined for England, but before departing, the two men duel and de Wardes is injured.

== Notes ==
Political offices
Preceded by The Duke of Albemarle	Master of the Horse; 1668–1674	Succeeded by The Duke of Monmouth
Honorary titles
Preceded by The Lord Langdale	Lord Lieutenant of the West Riding of Yorkshire; 1661–1667	Succeeded by The Earl of Burlington
Preceded by The Earl of Burlington	Lord Lieutenant of the West Riding of Yorkshire; 1667–1674	Succeeded by The Viscount Latimer
Preceded by The Lord Fairfax of Cameron	Custos Rotulorum of the West Riding of Yorkshire; 1671–1679	Succeeded by The Earl of Burlington
Peerage of England
Preceded by George Villiers	Duke of Buckingham; 1628–1687	Extinct
Preceded by Katherine Villiers	Baron de Ros; 1649–1687	Succeeded by Charlotte Boyle, after abeyance was terminated in 1806
