= Lady Fairfax =

Lady Fairfax may refer to:

- Anne Fairfax (1617/8–1665), English noblewoman and wife of Thomas Fairfax, 3rd Lord Fairfax of Cameron
- Mary Fairfax (1922–2017), Polish-born Australian businesswoman and philanthropist
