= Anne Fairfax (disambiguation) =

Anne Fairfax (1617/1618 – 1665) was an English noblewoman.

Ann or Anne Fairfax may also refer to:

- Ann Fairfax, pseudonym of Scottish writer Marion Chesney (1936–2019)
- Ann Fairfax (landowner) (1725/6–1793), landowner and intended resident of Fairfax House, York, England
