= Mary Villiers, Duchess of Buckingham =

English noblewoman (1638–1704)

Her Grace The Duchess of Buckingham
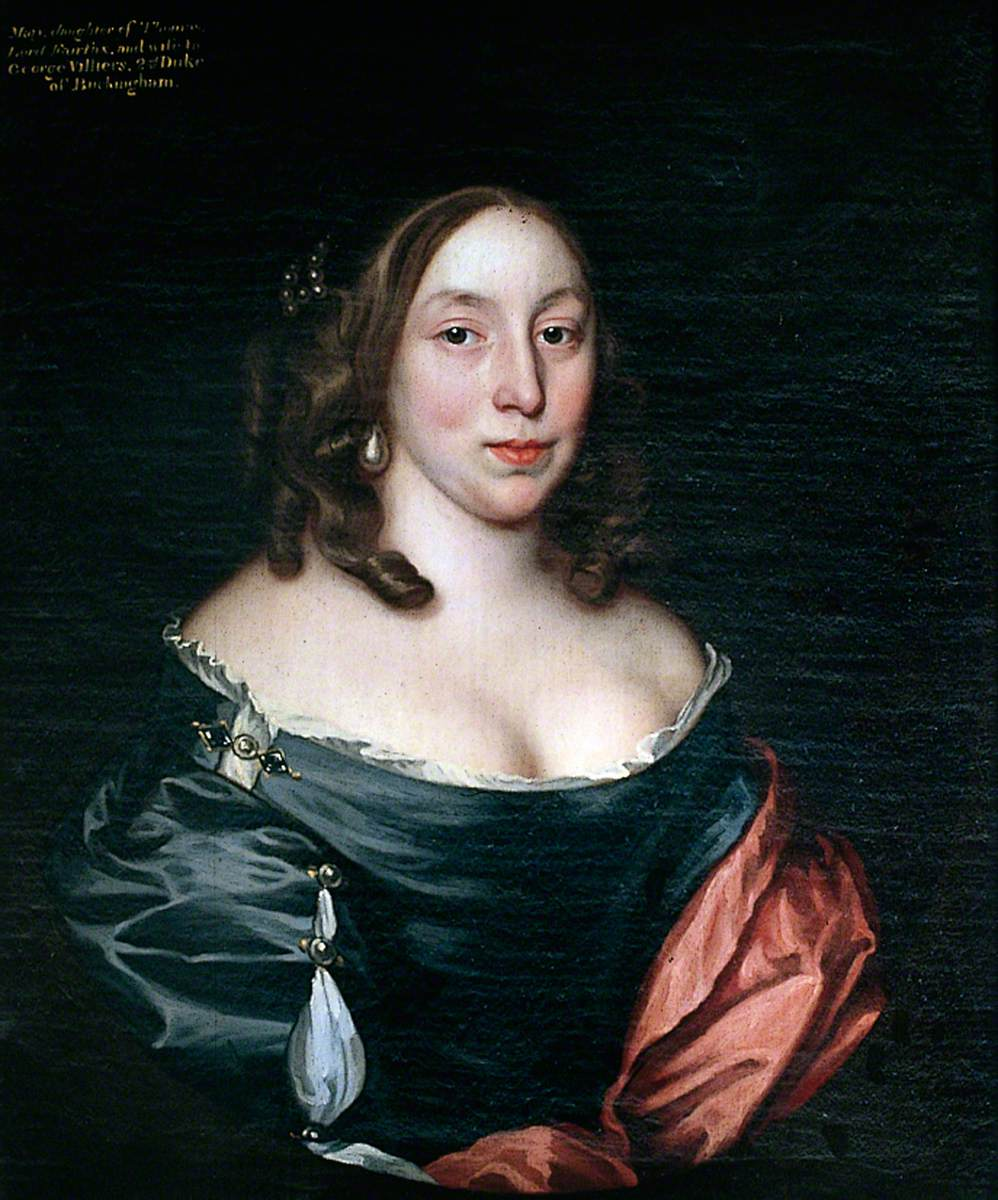
- Mary Villiers, Duchess of Buckingham by John Michael Wright

Lady of the Bedchamber

Personal details
- Born: 30 July 1638
- Died: 20 October 1704 (aged 66)
- Spouse: George Villiers, 2nd Duke of Buckingham
- Parents: Thomas Fairfax, 3rd Lord Fairfax of Cameron; Anne Vere

Mary Villiers, Duchess of Buckingham (née Fairfax; 30 July 1638 – 20 October 1704), was an English courtier. She was the wife of George Villiers, 2nd Duke of Buckingham.

== Biography ==
Mary Fairfax was the daughter of Thomas Fairfax, 3rd Lord Fairfax of Cameron, and Anne Vere. She was baptised in York at St Mary, Bishophill Junior on 1 August 1638. During the 1650s, she was tutored by Andrew Marvell.

Mary was to have married Philip Stanhope, 2nd Earl of Chesterfield, but developed a preference for Buckingham, whom she married on 15 September 1657 at Bolton Percy, following his return from exile. It has been suggested that Buckingham's pursuit of Mary was part of a scheme to regain possession of his father's former London residence, York House; Fairfax, who had been given the house, went along with this. Buckingham remained under suspicion by the government, and was placed under house arrest a few weeks later. After escaping, he was imprisoned in the Tower of London until his father-in-law, Fairfax, arranged his release in February 1659.

The couple had no children. The duchess was made a Lady of the Bedchamber to Catherine of Braganza, queen of Charles II of England, and held the position from 1663 until 1679. In the course of their marriage, Mary tolerated her husband's mistresses and was called "a most virtuous and pious lady, in a vicious age and Court". In 1668, after fatally wounding Francis Talbot, 11th Earl of Shrewsbury, in a duel, Buckingham set up house with his widow, Anna, and Mary Villiers was obliged to return to live with her parents until the liaison ended in 1674.

In October 1670 the duchess, with the queen, and her friend the Duchess of Richmond decided to go to a fair near Audley End disguised as country women for a "merry frolic", dressed in red petticoats and waistcoats. The costumes were outlandish rather than convincing, and they began to draw a crowd. When they tried to buy stockings and gloves, their speech was also conspicuous. A member of the crowd recognised the queen from a dinner she had attended. The party returned followed by as many people at the fair as had horses.

The duke died in 1687. On her death, the dowager duchess was buried with her husband in the Buckingham vault at Westminster Abbey.
