= St James' Church, Bilbrough =

Church in Bilbrough, North Yorkshire, England

Coordinates: 53°54′43″N 1°11′40″W

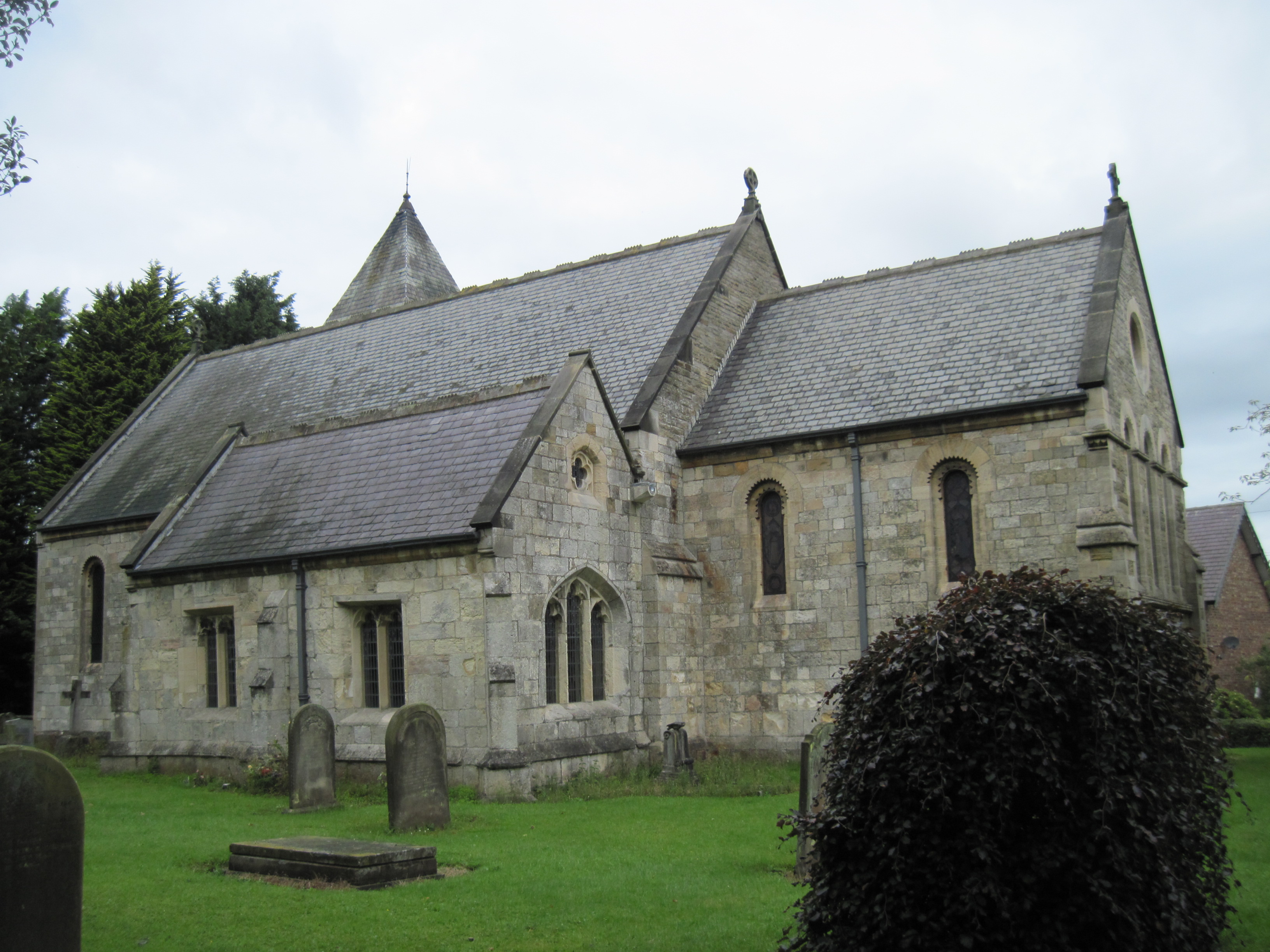
The church, from the south-east, in 2011

St James' Church is the parish church of Bilbrough, a village between York and Tadcaster in North Yorkshire, in England.

A church was built on the site in the 12th century, initially as a chapel in the parish of Askham Richard. By the early 19th century, it remained a small building, seating 76 people, with a west tower and south door. In 1873, the church was largely demolished, with only the south-east chapel retained. The Norman font was moved to the garden of the old rectory.

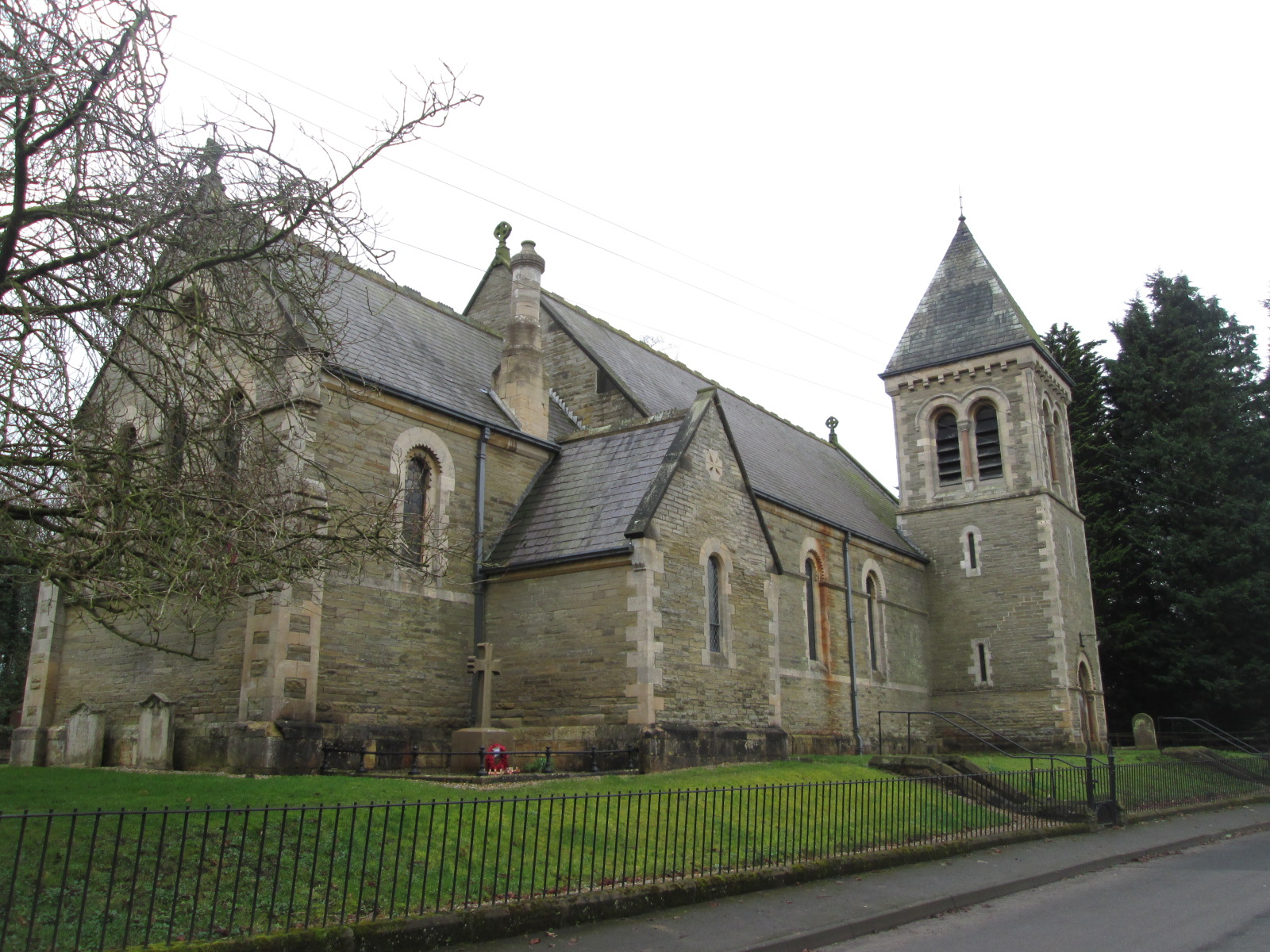
North-east view of the church, in 2014

A new church was built to the designs of George Fowler Jones, in a broadly Norman style. The church was reordered in 1970, and the mediaeval altar stone was dug up and incorporated into the new altar table. In 1985, the church was Grade II listed.

The church is built of sandstone, with a Magnesian Limestone plinth, quoins and window surrounds, and a roof of Welsh slate. There is a north-west tower, a nave and a chancel, a vestry to the north-east, and the south-east chapel. The chapel has a Perpendicular window. Inside the chapel is the tomb of Thomas Fairfax, dating from 1671.

== See also ==
- Listed buildings in Bilbrough
