= John Talbot, 10th Earl of Shrewsbury =

English and Irish peer

John Talbot, 10th Earl of Shrewsbury, 10th Earl of Waterford (1601 – 8 February 1654), was an English nobleman.

== Life ==
He was the son of John Talbot of Longford, Newport, Shropshire (died London, 1607 or c. 1607), and his wife Eleanor Baskerville, daughter of Sir Thomas Baskerville of Wolvershill, Herefordshire, and of Brinsop, Herefordshire, and paternal grandson of Sir John Talbot of Grafton and Catherine or Katharine Petre.

He remained in his family's Roman Catholic faith and took part on the side of King Charles I in the English Civil War. He was First Commissioner of Advice for the counties of Worcestershire, Shropshire and Staffordshire in 1644/45, and he served on the Royalist garrison at Worcester when it surrendered to Parliament in July 1646. In 1647 his estates were sequestered and compounded by Parliament on grounds of his being a "Papist and delinquent" (i.e. Catholic and royalist).

In September 1651 he accompanied Charles II when he fled after defeat at the battle of Worcester, escorting him to White Ladies Priory in Shropshire, where the king was hidden for a time. The Earl died in 1653/54 at Tasmore, Oxfordshire, (Tusmore?) and was succeeded by his second son.

== Family ==
Talbot married Mary Fortescue, by whom he had seven children:

- Lady Frances Talbot (d. 17 July 1641), who married George Winter, 1st Baronet (1622–1658), and had one child, Thomas Winter.
- George Talbot, Baron Talbot (c. 1620 – 7 March 1644), who married Mary, daughter of Percy Herbert, 2nd Baron Powis. He had one daughter, Mary, who was living in 1649 but died young and unmarried.
- Francis Talbot, 11th Earl of Shrewsbury (1623–1667), who succeeded
- Edward Talbot, who died at the Battle of Marston Moor, 1644
- Hon. Gilbert Talbot (bef. 1654–1711), who married Jane Flatsbury and had children, including Gilbert Talbot, 13th Earl of Shrewsbury
- Lady Catherine, who married Thomas Whetenhall of East Peckham
- Lady Mary Talbot (bef. 1654 – c. March 1711), who married first Charles Arundell and second Mervyn Tuchet, 4th Earl of Castlehaven; she had children from both marriages.

He later married Hon. Frances Arundell, 4th daughter of Thomas Arundell, 1st Baron Arundell of Wardour and had three sons and a daughter by her:

- Hon. John Talbot, who died young
- Hon. Bruno Talbot, c. 1650 – aft.1690 Chancellor of the Exchequer of Ireland, 1686–1690
- Hon. Thomas Talbot, who married Anne Tate daughter of Sir John Tate. Thomas and Anne's son Matthew Talbot (I) immigrated to Maryland and then moved to Virginia. Matthew (I) is the proginator of the Talbot Family of Virginia and Georgia.
- Lady Anne, who became a nun in France

Political offices
Preceded by The Earl of Shrewsbury	Lord High Steward of Ireland; 1630–1654	Succeeded by The Earl of Shrewsbury
Peerage of England
Preceded by George Talbot	Earl of Shrewsbury; 1630–1654	Succeeded by Francis Talbot
Peerage of Ireland
Preceded by George Talbot	Earl of Waterford; 1630–1654	Succeeded by Francis Talbot
