= Bilbrough =

Village and civil parish in North Yorkshire, England

Coordinates: 53.912740°N 1.191900°W

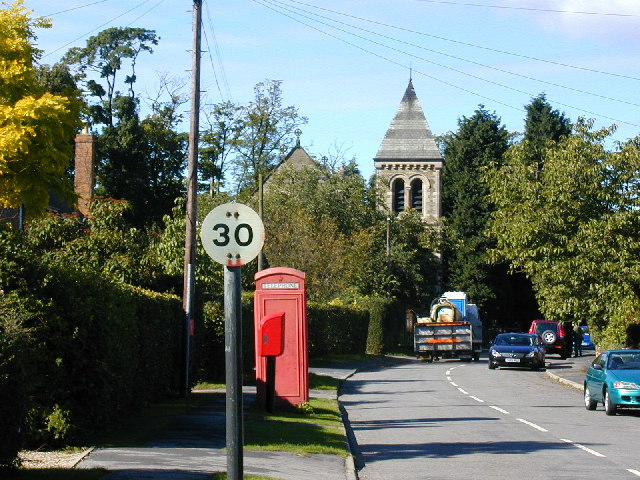
- Main Street, Bilbrough

- Location within North Yorkshire
- Population: 348 (2011 census)
- OS grid reference: SE531465
- Civil parish: Bilbrough
- Unitary authority: North Yorkshire
- Ceremonial county: North Yorkshire
- Region: Yorkshire and the Humber
- Country: England
- Sovereign state: United Kingdom
- Post town: YORK
- Postcode district: YO23
- Police: North Yorkshire
- Fire: North Yorkshire
- Ambulance: Yorkshire

Bilbrough (/ˈbɪlbrə/) is a village and civil parish in the county of North Yorkshire, England, 6 miles (10 km) south-west of York, and just outside the York city boundary. According to the 2001 Census it had a population of 319 increasing to 348 at the 2011 census.

The village was historically part of the West Riding of Yorkshire until 1974. From 1974 to 2023 it was part of the Selby District. It is now administered by the unitary North Yorkshire Council.

== History ==
The name means "The fortress of Bila", a personal name – probably Anglo-Saxon – not recorded but suggested by numerous other placenames.

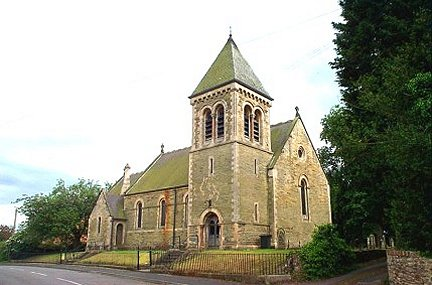
St James' Church, Bilbrough

The village and the surrounding parish has an area of 1,390 acres and was mostly the property of the Fairfax family from the 14th century onwards. Thomas Fairfax, parliamentary commander-in-chief during the English Civil War, is buried here in a tomb inside the Fairfax Chapel within the village church, beside his wife Anne, daughter of Lord Vere, Baron of Tilbury. Other notable landowners of the Parish included Richard Basy, an MP for York in the late 13th century.

Bilbrough Manor, built in 1902 for Guy Thomas Fairfax, is a Grade II listed building. The original Manor House, now a farmhouse, was built in 1670 for Thomas Fairfax. It is known that the former MP and Lord Mayor of York, Admiral Robert Fairfax, resided at this Manor. It was destroyed by fire in 1832.

In 1881 the population was 198.

The village is the subject of a 17th-century poem, Upon the hill and grove at Bilbrough, written by English metaphysical poet and politician, Andrew Marvell.

== Geography ==
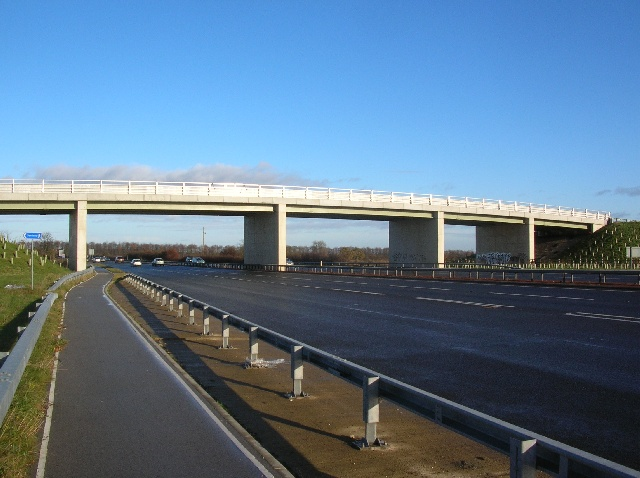
A64 flyover at Bilbrough top

The village is set amongst fields and farmland north of the A64 road on lateral moraine made of boulder clay and gravel, 150 feet above sea level. A flyover which affords access to the village was opened on 9 June 2005 by the then Roads Minister Dr Stephen Ladyman, replacing an earlier junction that was a known accident blackspot. Close to the flyover, at either side of the A64, there are small service stations, hotels and fast food restaurants.

To the west of the village is Ingle Edge Hill with views to Marston Moor and Towton. Close by is a tumulus of an ancient chieftain that faces towards Leeds.

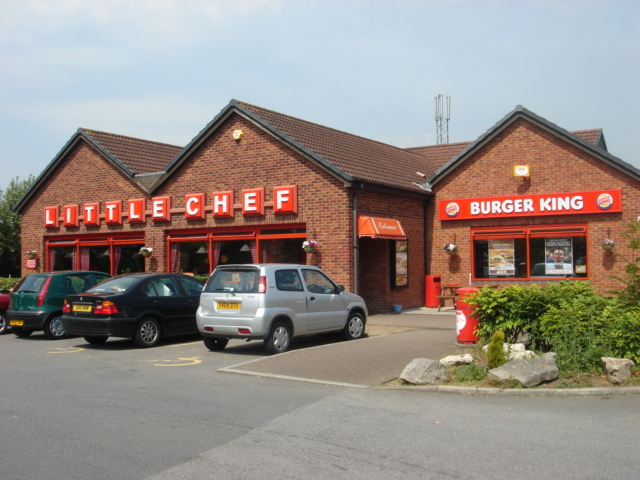
A64 Services, often used by Leeds and York commuters

The main street in Bilbrough is home to The Three Hares public house and a parish church which dates back to Norman times. The village hall offers community events.

== Parish Council ==
The local Parish Council has seven available councillor posts and is within the North Yorkshire Council ward of Appleton Roebuck and Church Fenton.

== Religion ==
St James' Church, Bilbrough was built in 1876 in a Norman style by Thomas Fairfax upon the remains of the original. There was also a Wesleyan Chapel built in 1836.

== See also ==
- Listed buildings in Bilbrough
