= Anna Talbot, Countess of Shrewsbury =

Anna Maria Talbot Countess of Shrewsbury
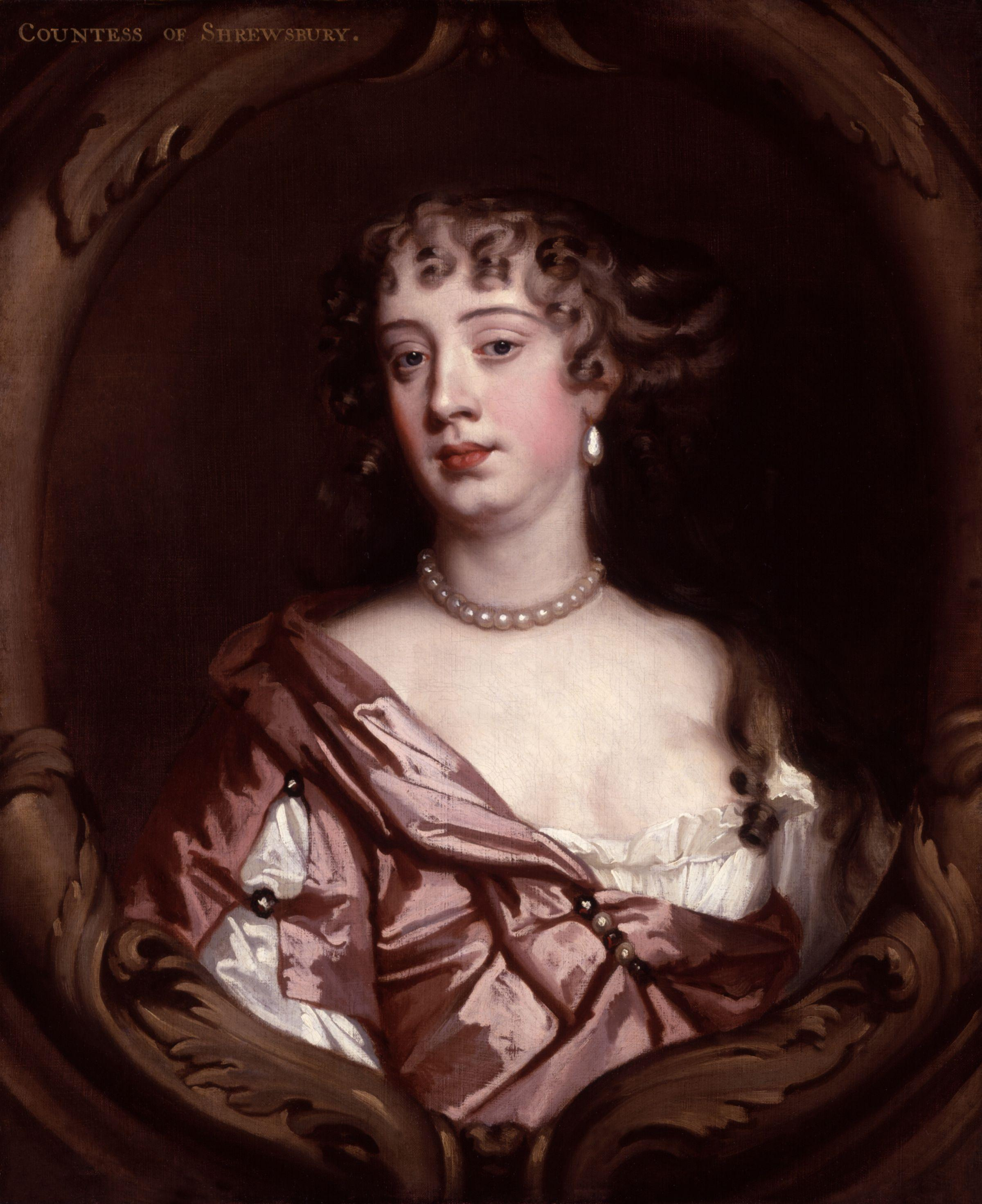
- Anna Talbot, Countess of Shrewsbury, by Peter Lely, c. 1670
- Born: Lady Anna Maria Brudenell; 25 March 1642
- Died: 20 April 1702 (aged 60)
- Spouses: Francis Talbot (m. 1659; died 1668) George Rodney Brydges (m. 1677–1702)
- Partners: Henry Jermyn; Colonel Thomas Howard; George Villiers
- Parents: Robert Brudenell (father); Anne Savage (mother)

Anna Maria Brydges, (formerly Talbot; née Brudenell; 25 March 1642 – 20 April 1702) known as the Countess of Shrewsbury from 1659 to 1677, by virtue of her marriage to Francis Talbot, 11th Earl of Shrewsbury, was an English aristocrat.

== Biography ==
Born on 25 March 1642, she was the eldest daughter of Robert Brudenell, who succeeded to the earldom of Cardigan as the second earl in 1663. Her mother was Anne Savage, the earl's second wife. Her brother was Francis Brudenell, Lord Brudenell, whose daughter was Lady Frances Brudenell.

Anna Maria married Francis Talbot, 11th Earl of Shrewsbury, on 10 January 1659, and they had one son, Charles Talbot, 1st Duke of Shrewsbury, born on 15 July 1660.

She was a passionate and unfaithful woman (harsher critics have called her a nymphomaniac). Her numerous lovers included Henry Jermyn, 1st Baron Dover, and Colonel Thomas Howard (younger brother of Charles Howard, 1st Earl of Carlisle). In 1662, they fought a celebrated duel for her favour in which Jermyn was left for dead and his second, Giles Rawlins, was killed.

In 1667, the Countess embarked on an affair with George Villiers, 2nd Duke of Buckingham, and the Earl of Shrewsbury finally challenged Villiers to a duel after a public brawl between Villiers and another of the Countess' lovers at a London Theatre. Rumours spread that the Countess herself was present at the duel disguised as a boy, however she was in fact staying in a convent in Pontoise at the time, having fled following the public scandal. Her husband died of the injuries inflicted on him in the duel which was fought with swords at Barn Elms on 16 January 1668, and was commented upon by Samuel Pepys in his diary the next day. The sovereign, King Charles II, strongly disapproved of duelling within his realm and the duke temporarily fell out of royal favour as a result. It was said that, at various times, Buckingham fought five different men over Anna.

For a time, the Duke of Buckingham kept Anna Maria as his mistress in his family home, where his wife, Mary, also resided. Anna gave birth to his illegitimate son and created a scandal at court by having the boy baptised in Westminster Abbey. Their affair was finally broken off in 1673. The countess went to France and spent some time in a convent. Her legitimate son had been removed from her care. While both his parents were Roman Catholics, his own upbringing was Protestant and as an adult, he conformed to the Church of England.

Anna Maria later returned to Britain and in 1677 remarried George Rodney Brydges (aft.1649–1714), MP for Haslemere 1690–1698 and Winchester 1700–1714. Her second husband was a younger but 2nd surviving son of Sir Thomas Bridges (d. 1707) of Keynsham, Somerset, by his wife Anne Rodney, daughter and coheiress of Sir Edward Rodney MP of Stoke Rodney, Somerset. From 1678 to 1685, he served as Groom of the Bedchamber, thanks to his wife buying him a place. The former Countess and George Rodney Brydges had one son George Brydges (1678–1751) also an MP, who died childless.

== Legacy ==
The former countess continued to be a famous beauty. Her portrait was painted by Sir Peter Lely and is held by the National Portrait Gallery in London. Her statue by Thomas Burman stands in St John's College, Cambridge.

The folk dance, "Anna Maria", is thought to have been named after her.

== Sources ==
- Origin of the folk dance
