= Listed buildings in Bilbrough =

Bilbrough is a civil parish in the county of North Yorkshire, England. It contains twelve listed buildings that are recorded in the National Heritage List for England. All the listed buildings are designated at Grade II, the lowest of the three grades, which is applied to "buildings of national importance and special interest". The parish contains the village of Bilbrough and the surrounding countryside. Most of the listed buildings are houses, cottages, and associated structures, farmhouses and farm buildings, and the others consist of a church and a milestone.

== Buildings ==
Name and location	Photograph	Date	Notes
St James' Church; 53.91195°N 1.19445°W		14th century	The oldest part of the church is the southeast chapel, the rest was designed by G. Fowler Jones and built in 1872–73. Most of it is in sandstone, with the plinth and dressings in magnesian limestone, and the roof is in Welsh slate. The church consists of a nave, a chancel with a northeast vestry and a southeast chapel, and a northwest tower. The tower has three stages, a north doorway with a moulded arch, slit windows and a band. The top stage contains paired round-arched bell openings, over which is a modillion cornice and a pyramidal roof.
The Normans and barn 53.92028°N 1.20180°W		Early to mid 17th century	The earliest part is the barn and one bay of the house, with the rest of the house dating from the late 18th century. The buildings are in reddish-brown brick with roofs of Welsh slate, with some pantile and some stone slate. The house has two storeys and four bays. The doorway has fluted pilasters, a radial fanlight, a frieze with rosettes, a dentilled cornice and an open pediment, and the windows are sashes with wedge lintels. The original barn to the north contains a cart entrance to a courtyard, and adjoining is a later barn.
The Old Manor House; 53.91212°N 1.19005°W	—	1670	The house, the remaining part of a larger house, is in magnesian limestone on a plinth, with a chamfered eaves band, and a Welsh slate roof with stone coping and a pinnacle. There are two storeys and an L-shaped plan, with a front range of two bays. The windows are casements, some with architraves, and some with mullions. On the gable end is a projecting pair of polygonal-sided chimney stacks.
Rose Cottage; 53.91220°N 1.19419°W	—	Early to mid 18th century	The house is in pinkish-brown brick, with a floor band, an eaves band, and a swept pantile roof. There are two storeys and three bays. On the front is a doorway, and to the right is a blocked doorway with an elliptical arch, and the windows are casements.
Grange Farmhouse; 53.91225°N 1.19471°W	—	Mid 18th century	The farmhouse, which was extended to the right in the 19th century, is in orange-brown brick, with dressings in brick and magnesian limestone, a Welsh slate roof, and two storeys. The original part has three bays, a plinth and quoins. The doorway has quoined jambs, a rectangular fanlight, and a keystone, and the windows are sashes with architraves and quoined jambs. The right bay has floor bands, an eaves band, and a window with flat arches of gauged brick.
Bilbrough Grange; 53.91229°N 1.19505°W		1755	A house in pinkish-orange brick on a two-course plinth, with stone dressings, a floor band, a low coped parapet with three ball finials, and a Welsh slate roof. There are two storeys, a main block of five bays, a two-bay addition to the left and two low rear ranges. On the front are sash windows with architraves and flat brick arches The entrance is at the rear, where there is a stair window with radial glazing at the top. On the right gable end is a dated rainwater head decorated with cherubs.
Gates and piers (west), Bilbrough Grange; 53.91260°N 1.19648°W	—	Late 18th century	The gates at the west end of the garden are in cast iron, and have two levels of decorative bars with a floral motif. The gate piers are in rusticated stone and have ball finials.
Gates and piers (southeast), Bilbrough Grange; 53.91217°N 1.19498°W	—	Late 18th century	The single gate at the entry to the drive is in cast iron, and has two levels of bars. It is flanked by rusticated stone piers.
Gates and piers to stable yard of Bilbrough Grange; 53.91224°N 1.19491°W	—	Late 18th century	The gates at the entrance to the stable yard are in cast iron, and have two levels of decorative bars with a floral motif. The gate piers are plain, with stone coping.
Summer house, Bilbrough Grange; 53.91252°N 1.19583°W	—	Late 18th century	The summer house in the garden of the house is in orange-brown brick with a Welsh slate roof. It has a hexagonal plan, one storey at the front and two at the rear, and there are doors at the front and the rear.
Milestone; 53.91145°N 1.17937°W		Early 19th century (probable)	The milestone is on the southeast side of the A64 road, and consists of a stone post with a cast iron plaque. It is about 0.75 metres (2 ft 6 in) high, and has a triangular plan and a round-arched top. On the top is inscribed "TADCASTER & HOBMOOR ROAD" and "BILBOROUGH", on the left side are the distances to Tadcaster and Leeds, and on the right side the distance to York.
Bilbrough Manor; 53.91126°N 1.19522°W	—	1901–02	A country house designed by Temple Moore, in roughcast brick with tile roofs, coped gables, kneelers and ball finials. There are two storeys, and a south front of eleven bays, and most of the windows have mullions and transoms. The north, entrance, front has four gables, and a two-storey porch with a four-centred arched entrance, over which is a coat of arms. In the south, garden, front is a doorway with a moulded surround, above which is a sunken panel containing a coat of arms. The centre of the east front contains a round-arched niche containing a stone seat.
