= Thomas Fairfax =

English army officer and politician (1612–1671)

The Right Honourable The Lord Fairfax of Cameron
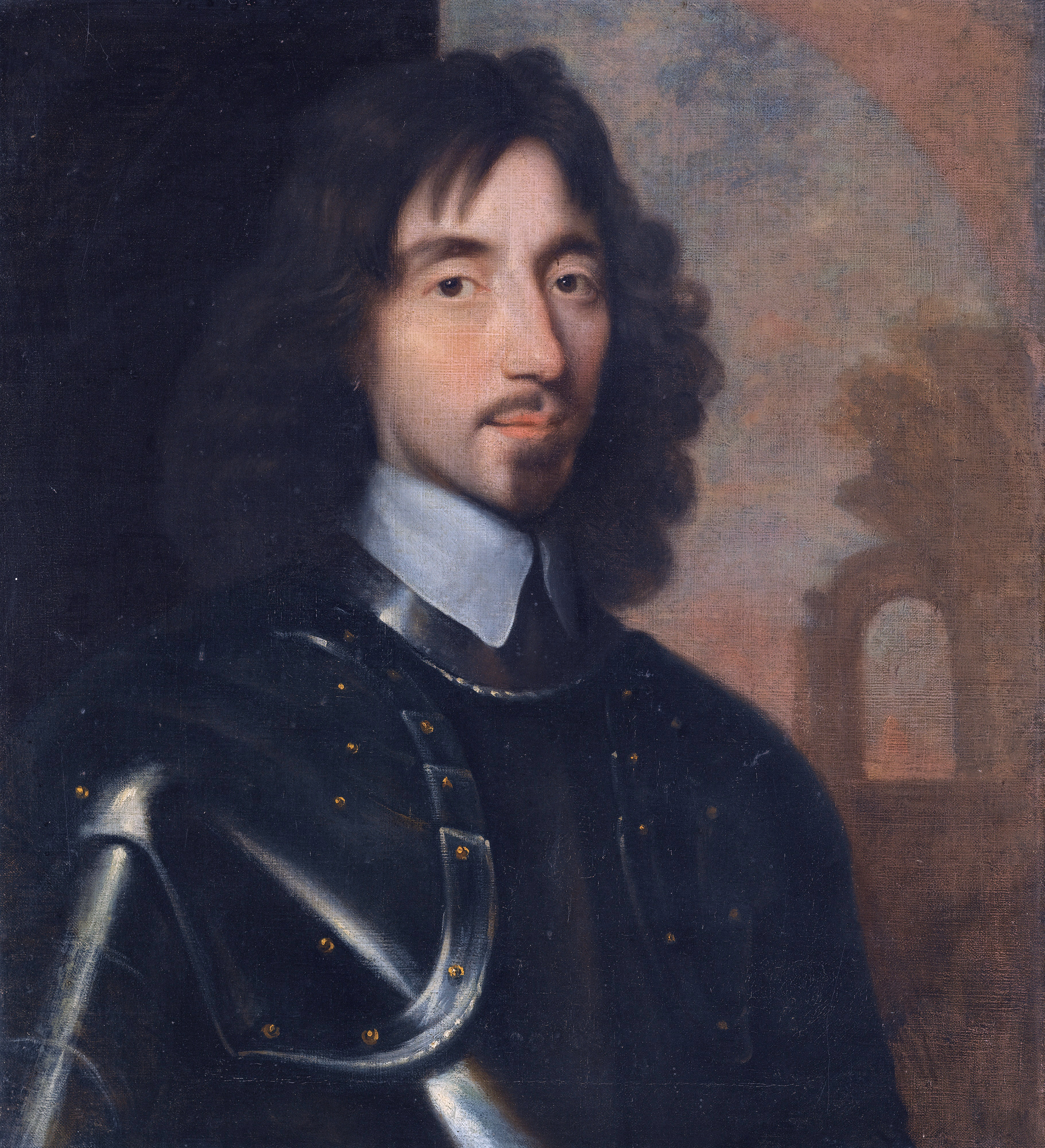
- Portrait by Robert Walker, 1649–1658
- Born: 17 January 1612; Denton Hall, Denton, West Riding of Yorkshire, England
- Died: 12 November 1671 (aged 59); Nun Appleton, West Riding of Yorkshire, England
- Burial place: St James' Church, Bilbrough, Yorkshire
- Spouse: Anne Vere (m. 1637–1665)
- Children: Mary; Elizabeth
- Parents: Ferdinando Fairfax, 2nd Lord Fairfax of Cameron (father); Mary Sheffield (mother)
- Military career
- Allegiance: Kingdom of England; Parliament of England
- Branch: English Army; Parliamentarian army New Model Army
- Rank: Lord General
- Nicknames: Black Tom; Rider of the White Horse
- Conflicts: Battle of Nantwich; Battle of Marston Moor; Siege of Oxford; Battle of Naseby; Battle of Maidstone; Siege of Colchester; Suppression of Leveller mutiny

Thomas Fairfax, 3rd Lord Fairfax of Cameron (17 January 1612 – 12 November 1671) was an English army officer and politician who commanded the New Model Army from 1645 to 1650 during the English Civil War. Because of his dark hair, he was known as "Black Tom" to his loyal troops. He was the eldest son and heir of Ferdinando Fairfax, 2nd Lord Fairfax of Cameron, and succeeded to the title of Lord Fairfax in 1648 on the death of his father, although he was generally known as Sir Thomas Fairfax to distinguish them. He adopted the profession of arms as a young man, when he served under Horace Vere in the Netherlands. In 1637, he married Vere's daughter Anne.

Fairfax was recalled to English service in 1639, for the first of King Charles' disastrous Bishops' Wars against Scotland. When these defeats led to the outbreak of the Civil War in 1642, Lord Fairfax declared for Parliament and was named general of Parliament's forces in the north, with Sir Thomas his second-in command. Sir Thomas later moved to join Parliament's stronger Eastern Association army, with which he achieved several significant victories, notably the decisive Battle of Marston Moor. In January 1645, when Parliament "new modelled" its armies, he was named commander-in-chief, and under his leadership the Army forced the surrender of the king in 1646.

When Royalist uprisings broke out in 1648, Fairfax first subdued the insurgents in Kent, then laid siege to Colchester in Essex. After the radicals in the Army and their supporters in Parliament proposed in 1649 to try the king, Fairfax refused to participate in the trial and attempted to prevent the execution. In 1650, he resigned his commission and retired to his estate. By 1660, seeing England fallen into disputes for power among rival factions, he backed General George Monck in his campaign that led to the restoration of the monarchy under King Charles II. Not long afterward, he retired again from public life until his death in 1671.

== Origins ==
Arms of the Lords Fairfox of Cameron

Thomas Fairfax was born to a Yorkshire family that could trace its descent to the 13th century. His grandfather, Thomas Fairfax, 1st Lord Fairfax of Cameron (1560-1640) fought under the Earl of Essex in the defense of the Protestant Netherlands against Spain. His grandson Thomas was born on 17 January 1612 at Denton Hall, Yorkshire, to Ferdinano Fairfax and his first wife, Mary, daughter of Edmund Sheffield, 1st Earl of Mulgrave. There was a younger brother, Charles, born 22 March 1614.

He was educated at St John's College, Cambridge, at which he matriculated at the age of 14 years in 1626, and admitted to Gray's Inn for the study of law on 26 May 1628. But his grandfather, old Lord Thomas Fairfax, wanted to see this grandson and namesake follow him into the wars for Protestantism, and young Thomas joined the forces of Horace Vere in the Netherlands by 1630.

During the Eighty Years' War, the Netherlands became a military school for British soldiers. In his few years of service there, young Thomas Fairfax came to know many of the future commanders of the Civil War, on all sides of the conflict. On his arrival he took part in the siege of Bois-le-Duc. However, Horace Vere retired in 1632 after the siege of Maastricht. Fairfax had sufficiently impressed him that the old general gave him his daughter Anne; they were married at Hackney on 20 June 1637. Their daughter Mary was born the next year on 30 July.

== Bishops Wars ==
In 1639, he commanded a troop of Yorkshire dragoons which marched with King Charles I against the Scots in the First Bishops' War, which ended with the Pacification of Berwick before any fighting took place. In the Second Bishops' War the following year, the English army was routed at the Battle of Newburn. Fairfax fled with the rest of the defeated army, but was nevertheless knighted in January 1641 for his services.

== Pre-Civil War events ==
The Fairfaxes, father and son, though serving at first under King Charles I, were opposed to the arbitrary prerogative of the Crown, and Sir Thomas declared that "his judgment was for the Parliament as the king and kingdom's great and safest council". Charles endeavoured to raise a guard for his own person at York, intending it, as the events afterwards would prove, to form the nucleus of an army. Fairfax was employed to present a petition to his sovereign, entreating him to listen to the voice of his parliament, and to discontinue the raising of troops. This was at a great meeting of the freeholders and farmers of Yorkshire convened by the king on Heworth Moor near York. Charles attempted to ignore the petition, pressing his horse forward, but Fairfax followed him and placed the petition on the pommel of the king's saddle.

== Civil War ==
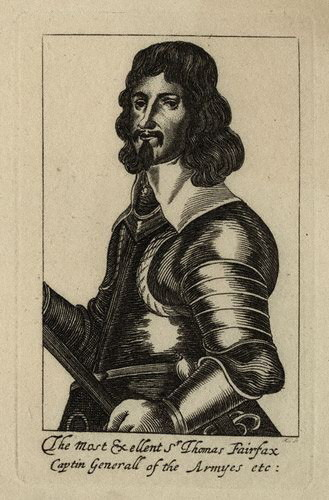
The Most Excellent Thomas Fairfax, Captin Generall of the Armyes etc, etching, 1640s. National Portrait Gallery, London

When the civil war began in 1642, his father, Lord Fairfax, was appointed general of the Parliamentary forces in the north, and Sir Thomas was then made lieutenant-general of the horse under him. Both father and son distinguished themselves in the Yorkshire campaigns. (Note: In the winter of 1642/43 Parliamentary victories were few and far between. One of the more notable was the capture of Leeds on 23 January 1643 by Parliamentary forces under the command of Sir Thomas Fairfax. The London news broadsheets published the exploits and one of them suggested that Fairfax was "the Rider of the White Horse", the allegory was immediately clear to those of a Puritan leaning as it was a passage in the Book of Revelation 19:11 "And I saw heaven opened, and behold a white horse; and he that sat upon him was called Faithful and True, and in righteousness he doth judge and make war", and hence implying to the Puritan supporters of Parliament that Fairfax was a hero doing God's work. (Hopper 2007, p. 174))

In 1643, a minor battle between Cavaliers for Charles I and a small group of Roundheads under Fairfax, who were en route from Tadcaster to Leeds, took place at Seacroft. Fairfax was obliged to retreat across Bramham moor, and summed up the Battle of Seacroft Moor as "the greatest loss we ever received".

Sometimes severely defeated, but more often successful, and always energetic, prudent and resourceful, father and son contrived to keep up the struggle until the crisis of 1644, when York was held by the Marquess of Newcastle against the combined besieging forces of the English Parliamentarians and the Scottish Covenanters, while Prince Rupert hastened with all available forces to the relief of the besieged garrison. A gathering of eager national forces within a few square miles of ground naturally led to a battle, and Marston Moor (2 July 1644) proved decisive for the struggle in the north. The younger Fairfax bore himself with the greatest gallantry in the battle and, though severely wounded, managed to join Oliver Cromwell and the victorious cavalry on the other wing. One of his brothers, Colonel Charles Fairfax, was killed in action. But the Marquess of Newcastle fled the kingdom, and the Royalists abandoned all hope of retrieving their affairs. The city of York was taken, and nearly the whole of the north would submit to the Parliament.

In the West, South and South West of England, however, the Royalist cause remained strong. The war had lasted two years, and the nation began to complain of the contributions that were exacted of and the excesses that were committed by the military. Dissatisfaction was expressed with the military commanders and, as a preliminary step to reform, the Self-denying Ordinance was passed. This involved the removal of the Earl of Essex from the supreme command, along with other Members of Parliament. This was then followed by the New Model Ordinance, which replaced the locally raised Parliamentary regiments with a unified army. Sir Thomas Fairfax was selected as the new Lord General, with Cromwell as his Lieutenant-General and cavalry commander. After a short preliminary campaign, the New Model Army justified its existence, and "the rebels' new brutish general", as the king had called him, proved his capacity as commander-in-chief in the decisive Battle of Naseby (14 June 1645). The king fled to Wales. Fairfax besieged Leicester, and was successful at Taunton, Bridgwater and Bristol. The whole of the west was soon reduced.

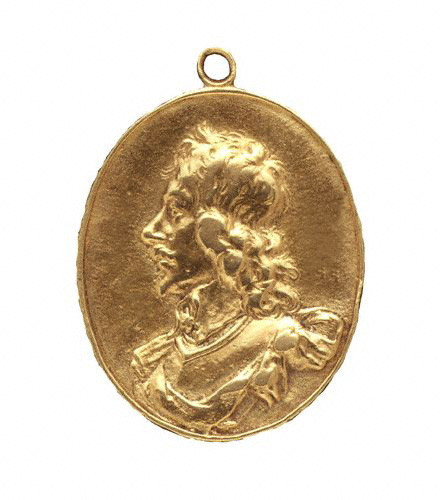
Gold medal depicting Thomas Fairfax in profile, 1645. National Portrait Gallery, London

Fairfax arrived in London on 12 November 1645. In his progress towards the capital he was accompanied by applauding crowds. Complimentary speeches and thanks were presented to him by both houses of parliament, along with a jewel of great value set with diamonds, and a sum of money. The king had returned from Wales and established himself at Oxford, where there was a strong garrison but, ever vacillating, he withdrew secretly, and proceeded to Newark to throw himself into the arms of the Scots Covenanter army there. Oxford capitulated in June 1646 following the final siege, and by the end of September 1646 Charles had neither army nor garrison in England, following the surrender of Thomas Blagge at Wallingford Castle after a siege conducted by Fairfax. In January 1647, the King was delivered up by the Covenanters to the commissioners of England's parliament. Fairfax met the king beyond Nottingham, accompanying him during the journey to Holdenby, treating him with the utmost consideration in every way. "The general", said Charles, "is a man of honour, and keeps his word which he had pledged to me."

With the collapse of the Royalist cause came a confused period of negotiations between the Parliament and the King, between the King and the Scots, and between the Presbyterians and the Independents in and out of Parliament. In these negotiations the New Model Army soon began to take a most active part. The Lord General was placed in the unpleasant position of intermediary between his own officers and Parliament. In July the person of the King was seized by Cornet Joyce, a subaltern of cavalry—an act which sufficiently demonstrated the hopelessness of controlling the army by its Articles of War.

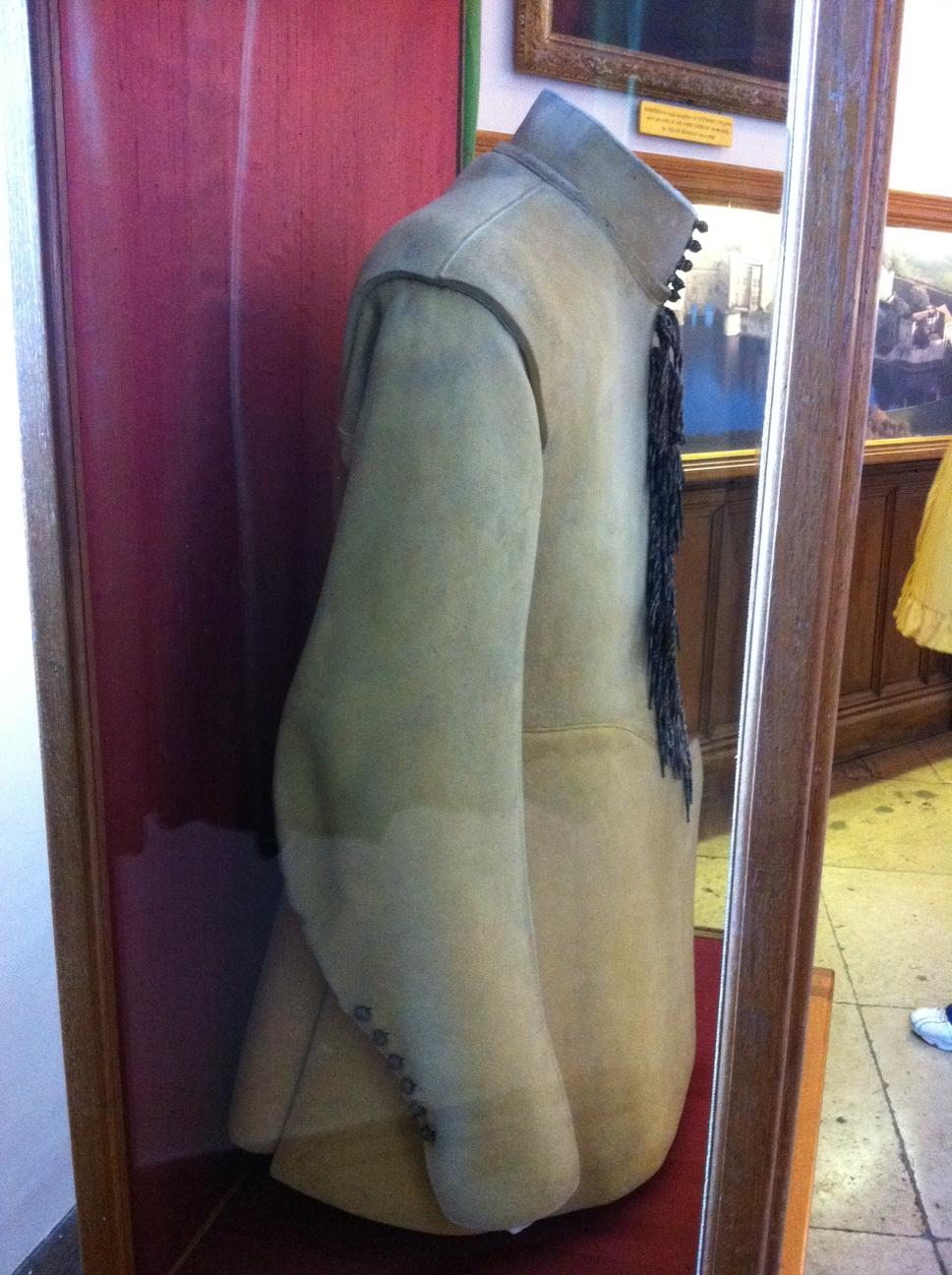
Doublet worn by Fairfax at the Battle of Maidstone in 1648

Fairfax was more at home in the field than at the head of a political committee, and, finding events too strong for him and that his officers were rallying around the more radical and politically shrewd Cromwell, he sought to resign his commission as commander-in-chief. He was, however, persuaded to retain it. He thus remained the titular chief of the army party, and with the greater part of its objects he was in complete, sometimes most active, sympathy. Shortly before the outbreak of the Second Civil War, Fairfax succeeded his father in the barony and in the office of governor of Hull. In the field against the English Royalists in 1648 he displayed his former energy and skill, and his operations culminated in the successful siege of Colchester, after the surrender of which place he approved the execution of the Royalist leaders Sir Charles Lucas and Sir George Lisle, holding that these officers had broken their parole. At the same time, Cromwell's great victory of Preston crushed the faction of the Scots Covenanters who had made an engagement with the king, the Engagers.

John Milton, in a sonnet written during the siege of Colchester, called upon the Lord General to settle the kingdom, but the crisis was now at hand. Fairfax was in agreement with Cromwell and the army leaders in demanding the punishment of Charles, and he was still the effective head of the army. He approved, if he did not take an active part in, Pride's Purge (6 December 1648), but on the last and gravest of the questions at issue he set himself in deliberate and open opposition to the policy of the officers. He was placed at the head of the judges who were to try the King, and attended the preliminary sitting of the court, but absented himself after this. The most likely explanation is that when he saw that they were serious about intending to execute the king he declined to have anything to do with this.

In calling over the court, when the crier pronounced the name of Fairfax, it is said that his wife, Anne Fairfax, shouted from the gallery that "he had more wit than to be there". Later when the court said that they were acting for "all the good people of England", she shouted "No, nor the hundredth part of them!". This resulted in an investigation and Anne was asked or required to leave the court. It was said that Anne could not forbear, as Bulstrode Whitelocke says, to exclaim aloud against the proceedings of the High Court of Justice. In February 1649 Fairfax was elected Member of Parliament for Cirencester in the Rump Parliament. Anne was later approached to intercede on the King's behalf to prevent his execution.

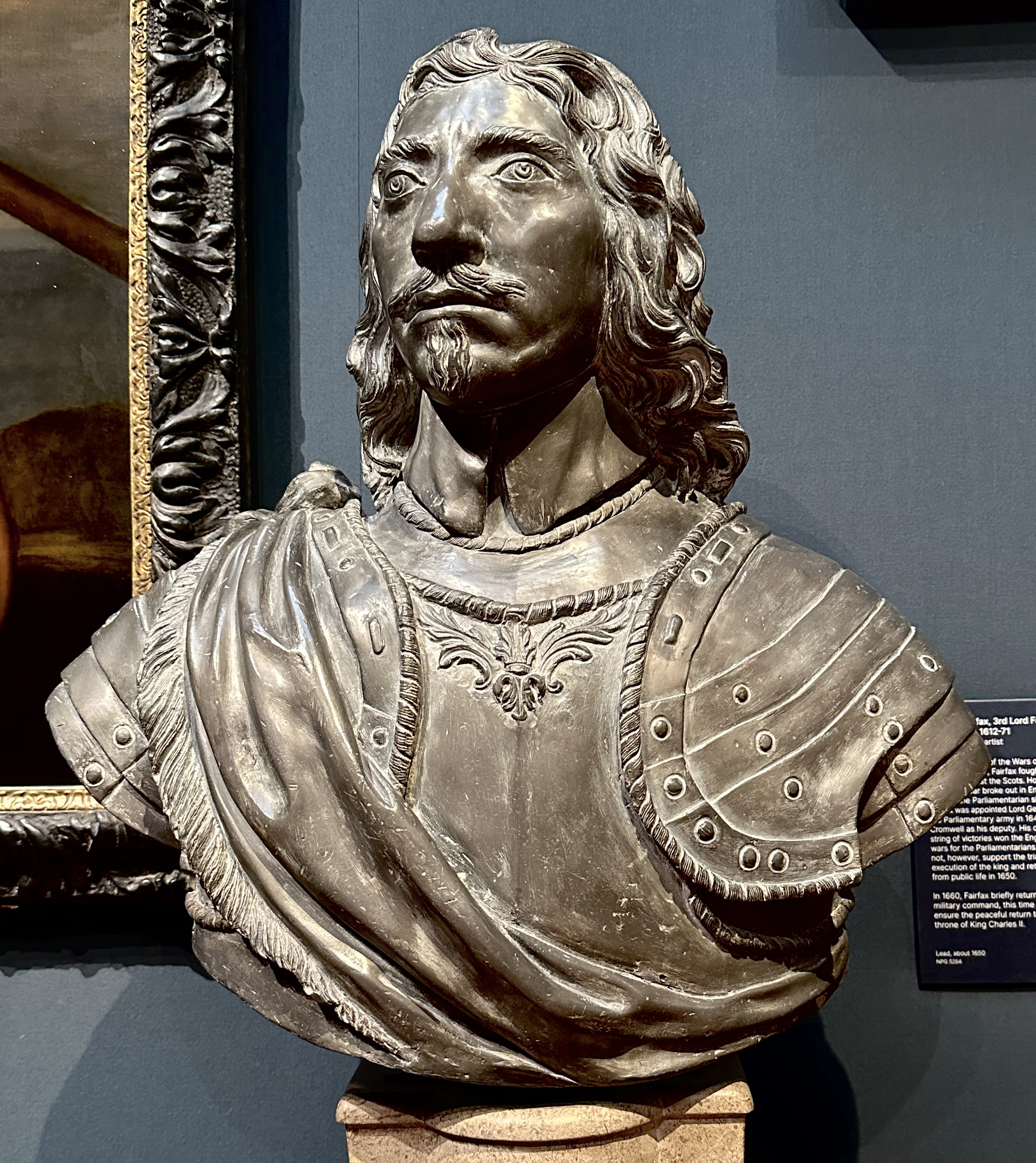
Lead bust of Thomas Fairfax, c. 1650, National Portrait Gallery, London

Fairfax's last service as Commander-in-chief was the suppression of the Leveller mutiny at Burford in May 1649. He had given his adhesion to the new order of things, and had been reappointed Lord General, but he merely administered the affairs of the army; when in 1650 Scots Covenanter Kirk Party eventually declared for Charles II, and the Council of State resolved to send an army to Scotland in order to prevent an invasion of England, Fairfax resigned his commission. Cromwell desired to see him continue as Commander-in-chief, as did those planning the war, but Fairfax could not support the war. Cromwell was appointed his successor, "Captain-general and Commander-in-chief of all the forces raised or to be raised at authority of Parliament within the Commonwealth of England."

== Interregnum ==
During the Commonwealth of England in 1654, Fairfax was elected MP for the newly created constituency of West Riding in the First Protectorate Parliament. He received a pension of £5,000 a year, and lived in retirement at his Yorkshire home of Nunappleton until after the death of the Lord Protector in 1658. Nunappleton and Fairfax's retirement there, as well as his personality, are the subject of Andrew Marvell's country house poem, Upon Appleton House. The troubles of the later Commonwealth recalled Lord Fairfax to political activity, and in 1659 he was elected MP for Yorkshire in the Third Protectorate Parliament.

== Restoration ==
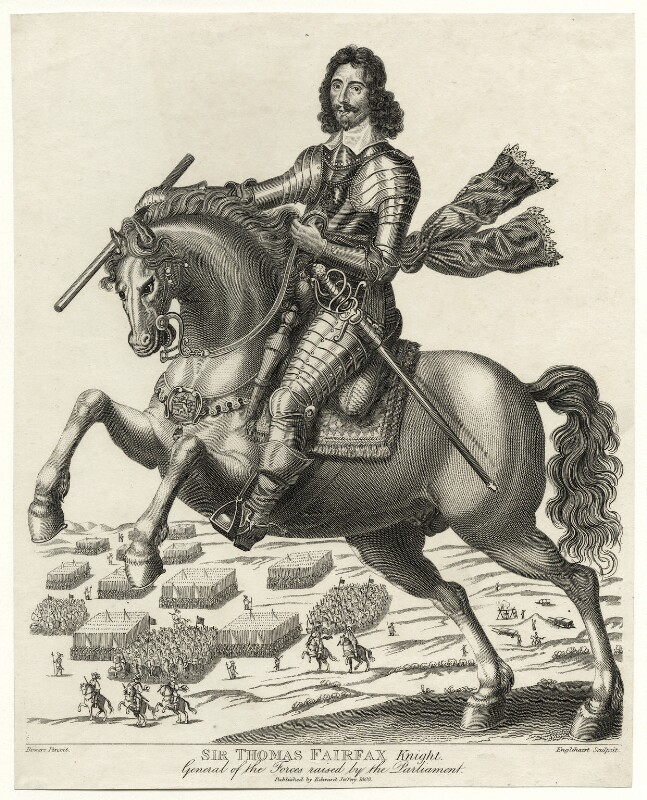
Sir Thomas Fairfax, Knight, line engraving, 1680. National Portrait Gallery, London

For the last time Fairfax's appearance in arms helped to shape the future of the country, when George Monck invited him to assist in the operations about to be undertaken against John Lambert's army. In December 1659 he appeared at the head of a body of Yorkshire gentlemen, and such was the influence of Fairfax's name and reputation that 1,200 horse quit Lambert's colours and joined him. This was speedily followed by the breaking up of all Lambert's forces, and that day secured the restoration of the monarchy. For these actions, along with his honourable conduct in the civil war, he was spared from the wave of Royalist retributions. In April 1660 Fairfax was re-elected MP for Yorkshire in the Convention Parliament. He was put at the head of the commission appointed by the House of Commons to wait upon Charles II at The Hague and urge his speedy return. His actions assisted the Stuart Restoration. Fairfax provided the horse which Charles rode at his coronation.

== Later life ==
The remaining eleven years of the life of Lord Fairfax were spent in retirement at his seat in Yorkshire. His wife died in 1665 and Fairfax died at Nun Appleton Priory in 1671. He was buried at St James' Church, Bilbrough, near York.

== Writings ==
Fairfax had a taste for literature. He translated some of the Psalms, and wrote poems on solitude, Christian warfare and the shortness of life. During the last year or two of his life he wrote two Memorials which have been published—one on the northern actions in which he was engaged in 1642–44, and the other on some events in his tenure of the chief command. At York and at Oxford he endeavoured to save the libraries from pillage, and he enriched the Bodleian with some valuable manuscripts. His correspondence was edited by G. W. Johnson and published in 1848–49 in four volumes.

The metaphysical poet Andrew Marvell wrote "Upon Appleton House, To My Lord Fairfax", nominally about Fairfax's home, but also his character as well as England during his era.

== Family ==
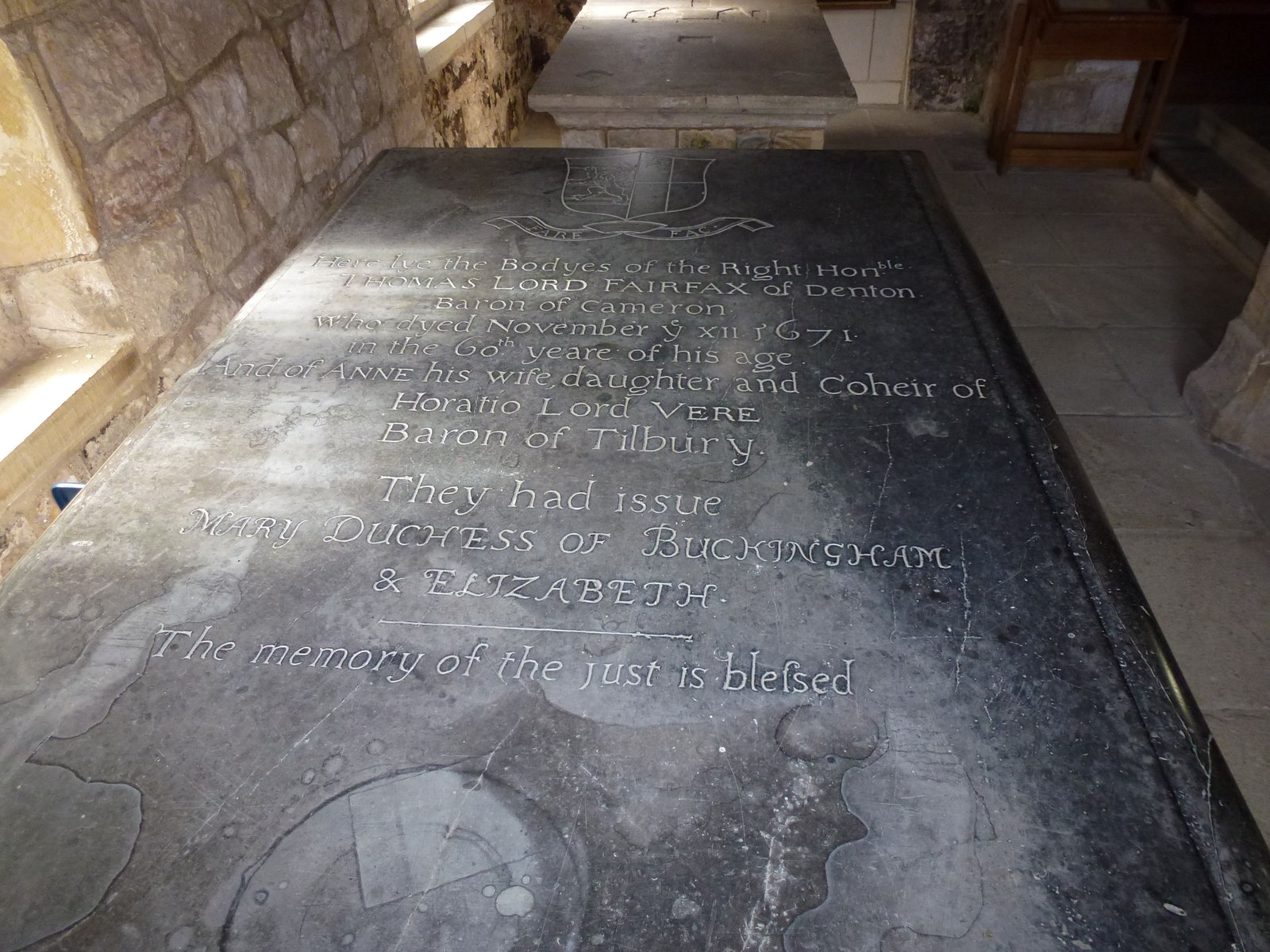
Tomb in St James, Bilbrough

Fairfax married Hon. Anne de Vere, daughter of Horace Vere, 1st Baron Vere of Tilbury and Mary Tracy, on 20 June 1637. They had two daughters, Hon. Mary Fairfax (30 July 1638 – 20 October 1704), who married George Villiers, 2nd Duke of Buckingham, and Elizabeth.

Fairfax was succeeded as Lord Fairfax by a cousin, Henry Fairfax, 4th Lord Fairfax of Cameron.

== Analysis ==
As a soldier he was exact and methodical in planning, in the heat of battle "so highly transported that scarce any one durst speak a word to him", chivalrous and punctilious in his dealings with his own men and the enemy. Honour and conscientiousness were equally the characteristics of his private and public character. But his modesty and distrust of his powers made him less effectual as a statesman than as a soldier, and above all he is placed at a disadvantage by being both in war and peace overshadowed by his associate Cromwell, who was politically talented and able to manipulate public antipathy against Charles to lead to his execution, something Fairfax never wanted.

== In fiction ==
Fairfax, played by actor Dougray Scott, is a pivotal character in the 2003 film To Kill a King, as well as in Rosemary Sutcliff's 1953 historical fiction Simon, being portrayed as inspiring and fair. He also appears as a central character in Sutcliff's 1959 novel The Rider of the White Horse, which gives an account of the early stage of the Civil War from the point of view of his wife, and in Howard Brenton's 2012 play 55 Days. Douglas Wilmer portrayed him in the 1970 Ken Hughes film Cromwell.

He was played by Jerome Willis in the 1975 historical film Winstanley. He appears in Michael Arnold's novel Marston Moor, which includes an account of Fairfax's adventures in the eponymous battle. He was also a central character, played by Nigel Anthony, in the 1988 BBC Radio production of Don Taylor's play God's Revolution.

== Citations ==
Parliament of England
Vacant Title last held by Sir Theobald Gorges; John George	Member of Parliament for Cirencester; 1648; With: Nathaniel Rich	Succeeded by Nathaniel Rich
Military offices
New title office created	Commander-in-Chief of the Forces; 1645–1650	Succeeded by Oliver Cromwell
New title office created	Captain General (Lord General); 1645–1650	Succeeded by Oliver Cromwell
Honorary titles
Vacant Title last held by The Viscount Savile	Custos Rotulorum of the West Riding of Yorkshire; 1660–1671	Succeeded by The Duke of Buckingham
Head of State of the Isle of Man
Preceded by James Stanley	Lord of Mann; 1651–1660	Succeeded by Charles Stanley
Peerage of Scotland
Preceded by Ferdinando Fairfax	Lord Fairfax of Cameron; 1648–1671	Succeeded by Henry Fairfax
