= Francis Talbot, 11th Earl of Shrewsbury =

Royalist officer

The Right Honourable Francis Talbot
- Earl of Shrewsbury, Earl of Waterford
- Coat of arms
- Tenure: 1654–1667
- Predecessor: John Talbot, 10th Earl of Shrewsbury
- Successor: Charles Talbot, 1st Duke of Shrewsbury
- Born: 1623
- Died: 16 March 1668 (aged 44–45)
- Spouse: Lady Anna Maria Brudenell (m. 1659)
- Issue: Charles Talbot, 1st Duke of Shrewsbury; John Talbot
- Father: John Talbot, 10th Earl of Shrewsbury
- Mother: Mary Fortescue

Francis Talbot, 11th Earl of Shrewsbury, 11th Earl of Waterford (1623 – 16 March 1668), (Note: dates in this article use the Julian calendar with the start of the year adjusted to 1 January (see Old Style and New Style dates)) was an English peer who was a Royalist officer in the English Civil War. He survived the war only to be mortally wounded in a duel with the Duke of Buckingham who was having an affair with his wife.

== Life ==
Talbot was the second son of John Talbot, 10th Earl of Shrewsbury, by his first marriage to Mary Fortescue. Francis Talbot was a captain in the royalist armies during the English Civil War and fought at the Battle of Worcester in 1651. Following the royalist defeat there he fled abroad to Europe but returned to England before February 1654, the month he succeeded to his father's earldom, when he petitioned the Lord Protector, Oliver Cromwell, to pardon him for all offences against Parliament. He was suspected of complicity in the unsuccessful royalist rising by Sir George Booth in August 1659 in the period between Cromwell's death and the restoration of King Charles II in 1660.

Shrewsbury was readily employed in Charles' court. He bore the Second Sword at the king's coronation in 1661, and in the same year was made Lord Housekeeper of Hampton Court and Treasurer and Receiver-General of Ireland.

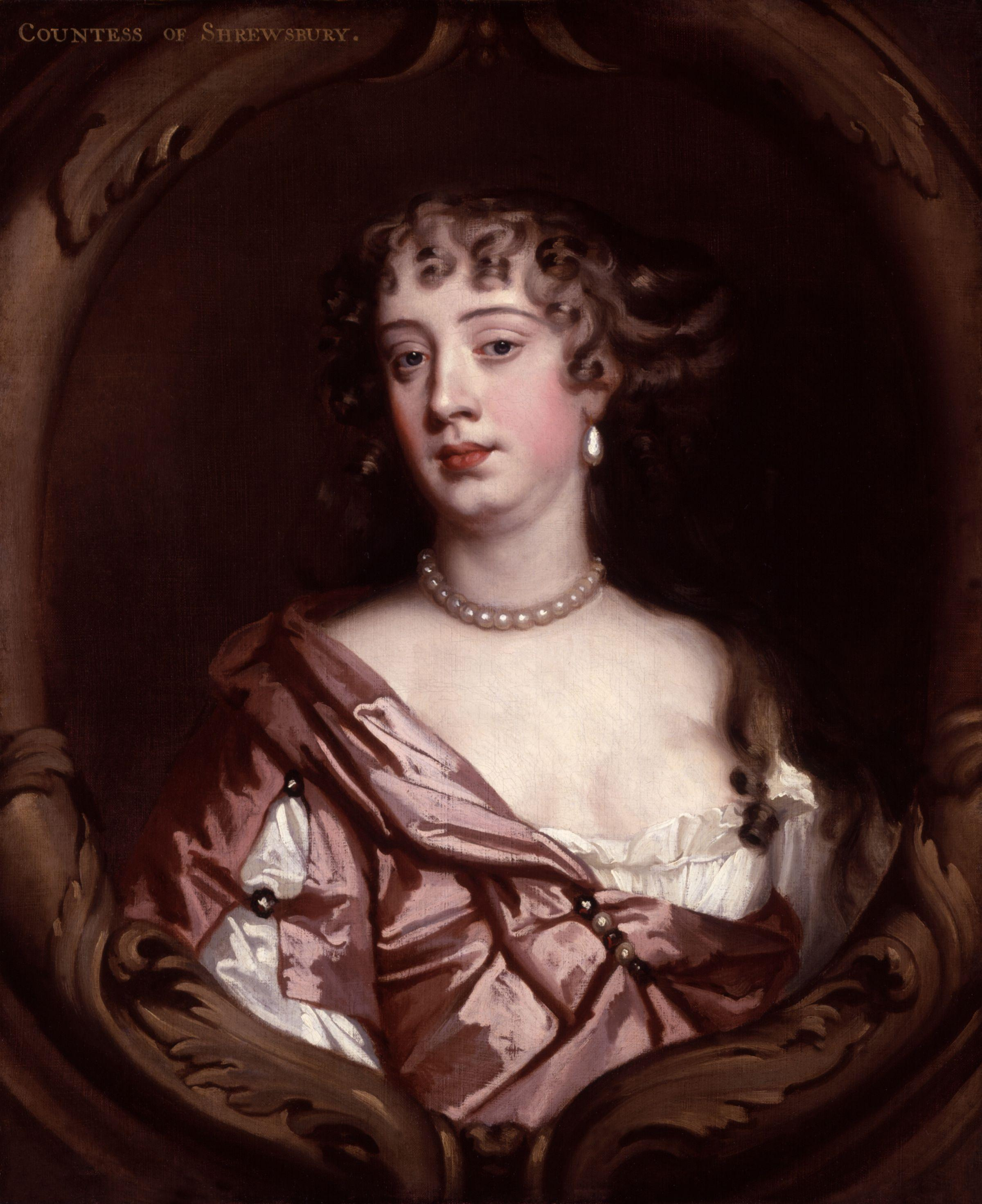
Lady Anna Maria Brudenell

After his first wife and two young sons had died, Shrewsbury (who had succeeded to his father's titles in 1654) married the "notorious" Lady Anna Maria Brudenell, a daughter of the 2nd Earl of Cardigan, on 10 January 1659.

On 16 January 1668, he duelled with one of his wife's lovers, George Villiers, 2nd Duke of Buckingham, and was mortally wounded, dying two months later of his injury. He was buried at the parish church of Albrighton in Shropshire.

Samuel Pepys wrote of the incident:

from the whole house the discourse of the duell yesterday between the Duke of Buckingham, Holmes, and one Jenkins, on one side, and my Lord of Shrewsbury, Sir John Talbot, and one Bernard Howard, on the other side: and all about my Lady Shrewsbury, who is a whore, and is at this time, and hath for a great while been, a whore to the Duke of Buckingham. And so her husband challenged him, and they met yesterday in a close near Barne-Elmes, and there fought: and my Lord Shrewsbury is run through the body, from the right breast through the shoulder: and Sir John Talbot all along up one of his armes; and Jenkins killed upon the place, and the rest all, in a little measure, wounded. This will make the world think that the King hath good councillors about him, when the Duke of Buckingham, the greatest man about him, is a fellow of no more sobriety than to fight about a whore.

... it is said that my Lord Shrewsbury's case is to be feared, that he may die too; and that may make it much the worse for the Duke of Buckingham: and I shall not be much sorry for it, that we may have some sober man come in his room to assist in the Government.

His wife is said to have disguised herself as a page and held Villiers' horse during the duel and afterwards slept with him while he wore the blood-stained shirt he had been wearing when he wounded her husband. The earl had had two sons with Maria Brudenell. He was succeeded by his eldest son, Charles. His second son, John Talbot (1665–1686), was also killed in a duel by Henry FitzRoy, 1st Duke of Grafton (the illegitimate son of King Charles II), Talbot "having given the Duke of Grafton very unhandsome and provoking language".

== Notes ==
Political offices
Preceded by The Earl of Shrewsbury	Lord High Steward of Ireland; 1654–1667	Succeeded by The Earl of Shrewsbury
Peerage of England
Preceded by John Talbot	Earl of Shrewsbury; 1654–1667	Succeeded by Charles Talbot
Peerage of Ireland
Preceded by John Talbot	Earl of Waterford; 1654–1667	Succeeded by Charles Talbot
