= Substructiones Insanae =

Substructiones Insanae (Latin: "crazy infrastructures") is a phrase first coined by Robert Burton in his Anatomy of Melancholy (1621). It referred to the attempts of aristocrats to establish their dominance in an area by building magnificent estates. Such attempts, he wrote, often ended in financial ruin as the scale of the project exhausted the fortunes of their owners.

== See also ==
- Folly - a building designed to convey a purpose
