= Anne Fairfax =

English noblewoman

Anne, Lady Fairfax
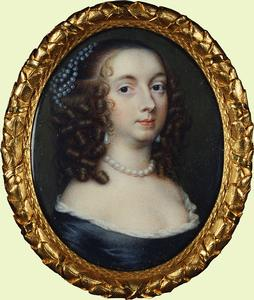
- Born: 1617 or 1618
- Died: 1665; Nun Appleton Hall, near Appleton Roebuck, North Yorkshire, England
- Spouse: Sir Thomas Fairfax
- Children: Mary; Elizabeth

Anne, Lady Fairfax (born Anne Vere, also known as Anne Fairfax; 1617/1618 – 1665) was an English noblewoman. She was the wife of Thomas Fairfax, 3rd Lord Fairfax of Cameron, commander-in-chief of the New Model Army. She followed her husband as he fought and she was briefly taken prisoner. It is said that she was ejected after heckling the court at the trial of Charles I.

== Life ==
Anne Vere was born in 1617 or 1618 in the Netherlands. Her parents were Mary and Horace Vere, 1st Baron Vere of Tilbury (1565-1635). Her father served as a commander during the Eighty Years' War and the Thirty Years War. In 1637 Anne married Thomas Fairfax, who rose to lead (1645-1650) the New Model Army during the English Civil War. Anne was a woman of influence and she accompanied her husband to battles. Taken prisoner near Bradford by William Cavendish, 1st Duke of Newcastle, she was released a few days later and given an escort back to her husband's army.

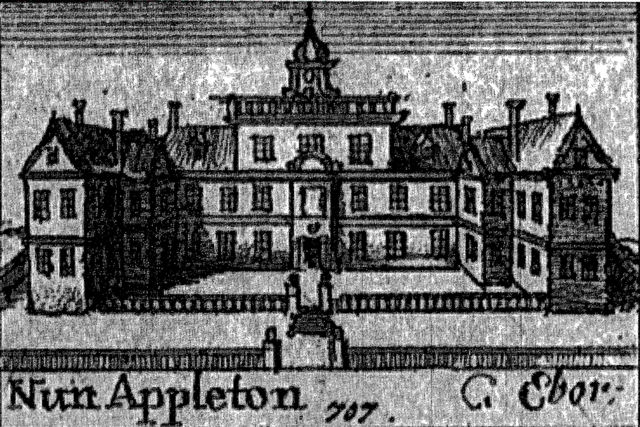
Nun Appleton in 1656

Her husband was placed at the head of the judges who were to try Charles I, but convinced that the King's death was intended, he refused to act. Fairfax did not attend the King's trial (January 1649) but Anne did. When the court called the name of Fairfax, it is said that his wife, Anne Fairfax, said "he had more wit than to be there". Later when the court said that they were acting for "all the good people of England", she shouted ‘No, nor the hundredth part of them!". This resulted in an investigation and Anne was asked or required to leave the court. It was said that Anne could not forbear, as Bulstrode Whitelocke says, to exclaim aloud against the proceedings of the High Court of Justice. In February 1649 Fairfax was elected Member of Parliament for Cirencester in the Rump Parliament. In January 1649 John Geree asked Anne and her mother to intercede on the King's behalf to prevent his execution.

Anne's daughter Mary was betrothed to Philip Stanhope, 2nd Earl of Chesterfield, but married the royalist George Villiers, 2nd Duke of Buckingham when he returned to England in 1657. Anne and her husband had to negotiate a £20,000 surety to allow the release of Mary's husband, George Villiers, from the Tower of London in 1659 after he was arrested.

Lady Anne Fairfax died in Nun Appleton Hall in 1665. Her husband died there six years later.

== Fictional depictions ==
In the 2003 film To Kill a King, Anne Fairfax is played by Olivia Williams, and has a role second only to those of her husband, played by Dougray Scott, and Oliver Cromwell, played by Tim Roth.

The Fairfaxes are the main characters in Rosemary Sutcliff's 1959 novel The Rider of the White Horse, and the book views the early stages of the Civil War from Anne Fairfax's point of view. Anne is portrayed as devoted to her husband but unable to secure his undivided attention, partly because of her physical unattractiveness.

== Sources ==
- Helms, M. W.; Cruickshanks, Eveline (1983), "Fairfax, Thomas, 3rd Lord Fairfax of Cameron [S] (1612–71), of Nun Appleton, Yorks.", in Henning, B. D. (ed.), The History of Parliament: the House of Commons 1660–1690, Boydell and Brewer
