= Henry Fairfax =

Henry Fairfax may refer to:

- Henry Fairfax (academic) (1588–1665), English priest and academic
- Henry Fairfax, 4th Lord Fairfax of Cameron (1631–1688), Scottish nobleman, peer, and politician
- Henry Fairfax (priest) (1634–1702), English Dean of Norwich and academic
- Henry Fairfax (Royal Navy officer) (1837–1900), British admiral
- Henry Fairfax (politician) (1850-1916), Virginia politician
- Sir Henry Fairfax, 1st Baronet (1790–1860), of the Cameron-Ramsay-Fairfax-Lucy baronets
- Sir Henry William Cameron-Ramsay-Fairfax-Lucy, 3rd Baronet (1870–1944), of the Cameron-Ramsay-Fairfax-Lucy baronets
- Sir Henry Montgomerie Cameron-Ramsay-Fairfax-Lucy, 4th Baronet (1896–1965), of the Cameron-Ramsay-Fairfax-Lucy baronets

== See also ==
- Fairfax (disambiguation)
