= Charles Fairfax (antiquary) =

English antiquary and genealogist

Charles Fairfax (1596–1673) was an English antiquary and genealogist.

== Early life ==
Fairfax was born at Denton, Yorkshire on 5 March 1596, and was the seventh and third surviving son of Sir Thomas (afterwards first Lord) Fairfax. His two surviving brothers (four others were killed in 1621) were Ferdinando and Henry. He entered Trinity College, Cambridge on 5 October 1611, and was called to the bar at Lincoln's Inn on 9 March 1618. About 1627 he married Mary, sole heiress of the Breary family, of Scough Hall in the forest of Knaresborough and Menston.

The counsellor and annalist of his family, the rest of his life was spent mainly on his family tree, at Menston, Yorkshire. At Menston he was within a few miles of his paternal home at Denton.

== Civil war ==
A few days before the battle of Marston Moor (2 July 1644) Cromwell and other parliamentary leaders held a conference at Fairfax's house at Menston around a table now at Farnley Hall, Yorkshire. While his nephew, Sir Thomas, afterwards the third Lord Fairfax, did much to preserve the minster and archives at York, Charles was engaged with another antiquary, Roger Dodsworth, in the search for and rescue of books and documents. In 1646 he was appointed by his brother, Ferdinando, the second Lord Fairfax, as steward of the courts at Ripon, and during the later years of the Commonwealth was induced to take service as a Colonel of Foot, a position which he held in George Monck's army in Scotland at the time of the Restoration of 1660. During Monck's march into Yorkshire he was appointed governor of the town of Kingston-upon-Hull. This office he held only about a year and then retired to Menston with a pension, granted him by Charles II out of the customs at Hull.

== Death and family ==
He died in Menston in December 1673. The registers of Fewston parish church record his burial, and also that of his wife in 1657; they were both buried in the Fairfax transept of the parish church at Otley, where there was a mural monument to their memory. Among his children were twin brothers, John, a captain in the army, and Henry, a fellow of Magdalen College, Oxford, and dean of Norwich, who were so alike as to be indistinguishable by their own mother.

== Written work and collections ==
Fairfax wrote a work in manuscript entitled Analecta Fairfaxiana. It contains pedigrees, carefully written and blazoned on vellum, of all the branches of the Fairfax family, and of many of the families connected with it, interspersed with many genealogical and literary notes, and about fifty anagrams, epigrams, and elegies in Latin. It went to Leeds Castle, Kent and then passed into the library of Sir Thomas Phillipps. Along with several related volumes, it was acquired by Leeds University Library in 1993.

By his will, dated 1672, Fairfax bequeathed manuscripts to Lincoln's Inn.
