= Denton Hall =

Denton Hall may refer to:

- Denton Hall, Wharfedale, UK
- Former name of a solicitor firm now known as Denton Wilde Sapte
