= Henry Fairfax, 4th Lord Fairfax of Cameron =

English politician

The Right Honourable The Lord Fairfax of Cameron
- Born: 30 December 1631
- Died: 13 April 1688 (aged 56)
- Title: 4th Lord Fairfax of Cameron
- Predecessor: Thomas Fairfax, 3rd Lord Fairfax of Cameron
- Successor: Thomas Fairfax, 5th Lord Fairfax of Cameron
- Spouse: Frances Barwick
- Children: 10, including Thomas Fairfax, 5th Lord Fairfax of Cameron
- Parent(s): Henry Fairfax; Lady Mary Cholmondeley

Henry Fairfax, 4th Lord Fairfax of Cameron (30 December 1631 – 13 April 1688) was an English politician. He was the grandson of Thomas Fairfax, 1st Lord Fairfax of Cameron.

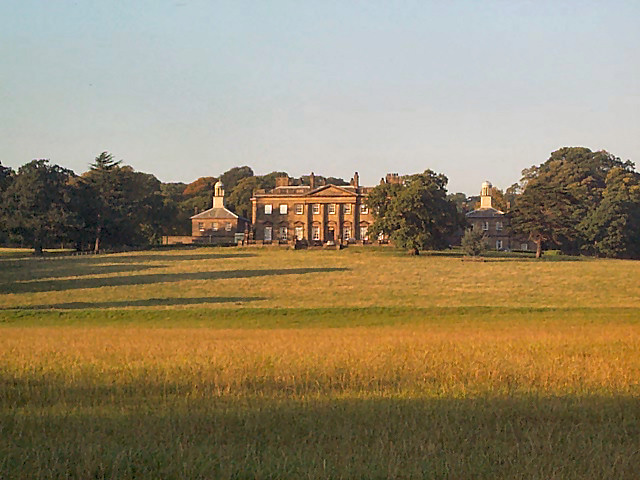
Denton Hall today

He was the son of Henry Fairfax, of York, Rector of Bolton Percy, Yorkshire and Lady Mary Cholmondeley (1593-1649) and was educated at Gray's Inn.

He took part in the Yorkshire rising in support of George Monck in January 1660 under the leadership of his cousin Thomas Fairfax, 3rd Lord Fairfax. He later succeeded his cousin in 1671, inheriting the family estate at Denton, North Yorkshire.

He sat in Parliament to represent Yorkshire in March and October 1679 and again in 1681.

He married Frances Barwick, and they had ten children:

- Mary Fairfax (born 29 July 1653)
- Dorothy Fairfax (born 30 December 1655)
- Thomas Fairfax, 5th Lord Fairfax of Cameron (born 1657)
- Henry Fairfax of Toulston (born 20 April 1659)
- Ursula Fairfax (born 3 May 1661)
- Frances Fairfax (born 2 April 1663)
- Bryan Fairfax (born 2 April 1665)
- Barwicke Fairfax (born 18 September 1677)
- Anne Fairfax (born 27 April 1670)
- Mary Fairfax (born 1673)

Peerage of Scotland
| Preceded by Thomas Fairfax | Lord Fairfax of Cameron; 1671–1688 | Succeeded by Thomas Fairfax |
