= Custos Rotulorum of the West Riding of Yorkshire =

This is a list of people who have served as Custos Rotulorum of the West Riding of Yorkshire.

- Sir Richard Lyster bef. 1544 – aft. 1547
- Sir Thomas Gargrave bef. 1558–1579
- Francis Wortley 1579–1583
- Sir Cotton Gargrave 1584–1588
- Sir John Savile bef. 1594–1616
- Sir Thomas Wentworth, 2nd Baronet 1616–1626
- Sir John Savile 1626–1630
- Thomas Wentworth, 1st Earl of Strafford 1630–1641
- Thomas Savile, 1st Viscount Savile 1641–1646
- Interregnum
- Thomas Fairfax, 3rd Lord Fairfax of Cameron 1660–1671
- George Villiers, 2nd Duke of Buckingham 1671–1679
- Richard Boyle, 1st Earl of Burlington 1679–1685
- vacant
- Lord Thomas Howard 1688–1689
- George Saville, 1st Marquess of Halifax 1689–1695
- vacant
- Charles Boyle, 2nd Earl of Burlington 1699–1704

For later custodes rotulorum, see Lord Lieutenant of the West Riding of Yorkshire.
