= Thomas Wentworth, 1st Earl of Strafford =

English statesman (1593–1641)

The Right Honourable The Earl of Strafford KG, JP, PC
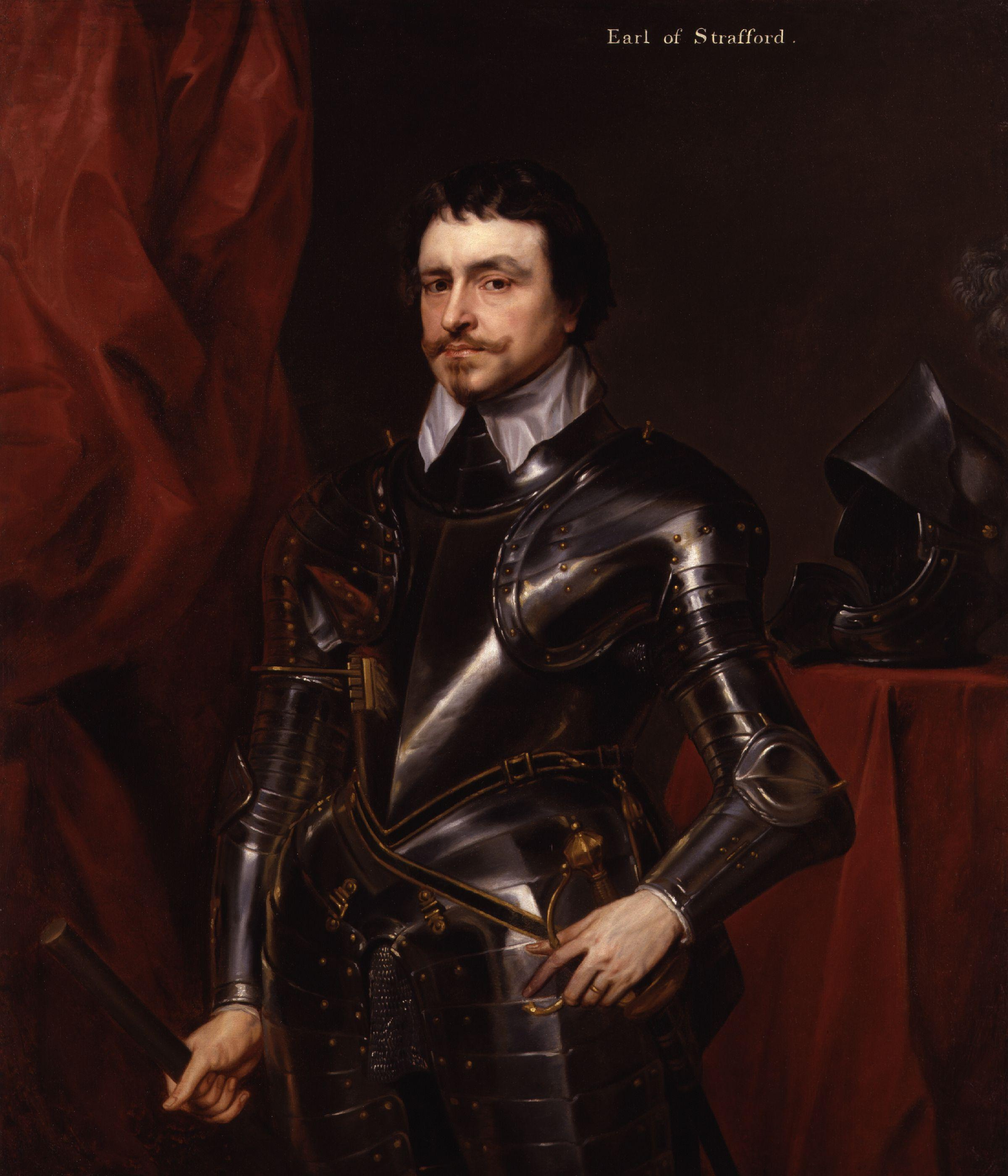
- Portrait by Anthony van Dyck, 1639

Lord Deputy of Ireland
- In office 1632–1640

Vice-admiral of Munster
- In office 1634–1640

Custos Rotulorum of the West Riding of Yorkshire
- In office 1630–1641

President, Council of the North
- In office 1628–1641

Member of Parliament for Yorkshire 1614–1621; 1625
- In office March 1628 – July 1628

Member of Parliament for Pontefract
- In office January 1624 – February 1624

Personal details
- Born: 13 April 1593 Chancery Lane, London
- Died: 12 May 1641 (aged 48) Tower Hill
- Cause of death: Execution
- Resting place: Wentworth, South Yorkshire
- Spouses: Margaret Clifford (m. 1611; died 1622) Arabella Holles (m. 1625; died 1631) Elizabeth Rhodes (m. 1632–1641)
- Children: William, 2nd Earl of Strafford; Anne; Arabella; Thomas; Margaret
- Parents: Sir William Wentworth (father); Anne Atkins (mother)
- Education: St John's College, Cambridge

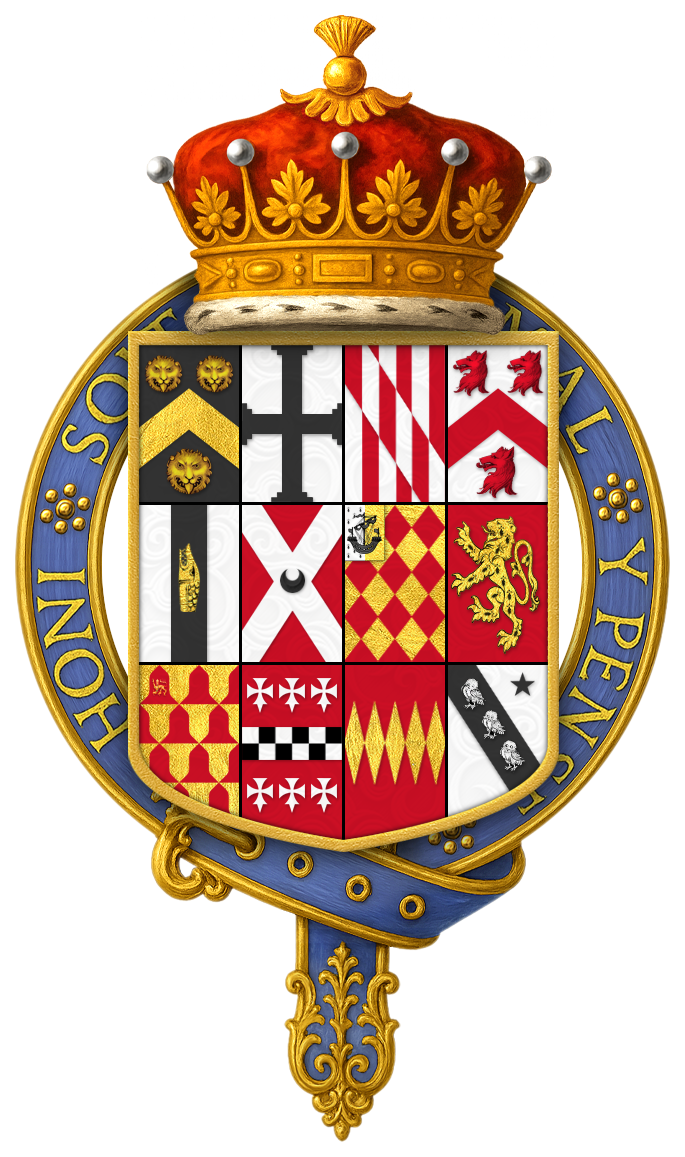
Coat of arms of Thomas Wentworth, 1st Earl of Strafford, KG

Thomas Wentworth, 1st Earl of Strafford (Note: He was created 1st Baron Wentworth in 1628, 1st Viscount Wentworth in late 1628 or early 1629, and, finally, 1st Earl of Strafford in January 1640. He was known as Sir Thomas Wentworth, 2nd Baronet, between 1614 and 1628) (13 April 1593 – 12 May 1641) was an English statesman who played a major role in the period leading up to the outbreak of the Wars of the Three Kingdoms. A prominent supporter of Charles I, from 1632 to 1640 he was Lord Deputy of Ireland, where he established a strong authoritarian rule. Recalled to England, he became a leading advisor to the King, attempting to strengthen the royal position against Parliament. When Parliament condemned Strafford to death, Charles reluctantly signed the execution warrant and he was executed.

== Personal details ==
Thomas Wentworth was born in London on 13 April 1593, eldest son of Sir William Wentworth, 1st Baronet, of Wentworth Woodhouse in Yorkshire, and his wife Anne Atkins. He was educated at St John's College, Cambridge, became a law student at the Inner Temple in 1607, and in 1611 was knighted. He married firstly Margaret, daughter of Francis Clifford, Earl of Cumberland and Grisold Hughes.

== Early parliamentary career ==
The young Sir Thomas Wentworth, 2nd Baronet, entered the English Parliament in 1614 as Yorkshire's representative in the "Addled Parliament", but it was not until the parliament of 1621, in which he sat for the same constituency, that he took part in a debate. His position was ambivalent. He did not sympathise with the zeal of the popular party for war with Spain, favoured by George Villiers, 1st Duke of Buckingham, James I's foremost advisor and favourite, but James's denial of the rights and privileges of parliament seems to have caused Wentworth to join in the vindication of the claims of the House of Commons, and he supported the protestation which dissolved the third parliament of James.

In 1622 Wentworth's first wife Margaret Clifford died. Wentworth, according to his friends, was deeply grieved by her death; but in February 1625 he married Arabella Holles, daughter of John Holles, 1st Earl of Clare and Anne Stanhope: a marriage which was generally believed to be a true love affair on both sides. He represented Pontefract in the Happy Parliament of 1624, but appears to have taken no active part. He expressed a wish to avoid foreign complications and "do first the business of the commonwealth".

In the first parliament of Charles I, in June 1625, Wentworth again represented Yorkshire, and showed his hostility to the proposed war with Spain by supporting a motion for an adjournment before the house proceeded to business. He opposed the demand for war subsidies made on Buckingham's behalf—after the death of James I, Buckingham had become first minister to Charles—and after Parliament was dissolved in November he was made High Sheriff of Yorkshire, a position which excluded him from the parliament which met in 1626. Yet he had never taken up an attitude of antagonism to the King. His position was very different from that of the regular opposition. He was anxious to serve the Crown, but he disapproved of the King's policy.

In January 1626 Wentworth asked for the presidency of the Council of the North, and was favourably received by Buckingham. But after the dissolution of the parliament, he was dismissed from the justiceship of the peace and the office of custos rotulorum of Yorkshire—which he had held since 1615—probably because he would not support the court in forcing the country to contribute money without a parliamentary grant. In 1627, he refused to contribute to the forced loan, and was subsequently imprisoned.

== The Petition of Right and its aftermath ==
In 1628, Wentworth was one of the more vocal supporters of the Petition of Right, which attempted to curb the power of the King. Once Charles had grudgingly accepted the Petition, Wentworth felt it appropriate to support the crown, saying, "The authority of a king is the keystone which closeth up the arch of order and government". He was consequently branded a turncoat.

In the parliament of 1628, Wentworth joined the popular leaders in resistance to arbitrary taxation and imprisonment, but tried to obtain his goal without offending the Crown. He led the movement for a bill which would have secured the liberties of the subject as completely as the Petition of Right afterwards did, but in a manner less offensive to the King. The proposal failed because of both the uncompromising nature of the parliamentary party and Charles's stubborn refusal to make concessions, and the leadership was snatched from Wentworth's hands by John Eliot and Edward Coke. Later in the session, he quarrelled with Eliot because Wentworth wanted to come to a compromise with the Lords, so as to leave room for the King to act unchecked in special emergencies.

On 22 July 1628, not long after the prorogation, Wentworth was created Baron Wentworth, and received the promise of the presidency of the Council of the North at the next vacancy. This implied no change of principle. He was now at variance with the Parliamentary Party on two great subjects of policy, disapproving both of the intention of Parliament to take the powers of the executive and also of its inclination towards Puritanism. When once the breach was made it naturally grew wider, partly from the energy each party put into its work, and partly from the personal animosities which arose.

As yet Wentworth was not directly involved in the government of the country. However, following the assassination of Buckingham, in December 1628, he became Viscount Wentworth and not long afterwards president of the Council of the North. In the speech delivered at York on taking office, he announced his intention, almost in the words of Francis Bacon, of doing his utmost to bind up the prerogative of the Crown and the liberties of the subject in an indistinguishable union. "Whoever", he said, "ravels forth into questions the right of a king and of a people shall never be able to wrap them up again into the comeliness and order he found them". His tactics were the same as those he later practised in Ireland, leading to the accusation that he planned to centralise all power with the executive at the expense of the individual in defiance of constitutional liberties.

The parliamentary session of 1629 ended in a breach between the King and Parliament, which made the task of a moderator hopeless. Wentworth had to choose between either helping the House of Commons dominate the King or helping the King to dominate the House of Commons. He chose the latter course, throwing himself into the work of repression with characteristic energy and claiming that he was maintaining the old constitution and that his opponents in Parliament were attempting to alter it by claiming supremacy for Parliament. From this time on, he acted as one of two principal members (the other being Archbishop William Laud of Canterbury) in a team of key royal advisors (the "Thorough Party") during an 11-year period of total monarchical rule without parliament (known both as "the Personal Rule" and the "eleven-year tyranny").

== Lord Deputy of Ireland ==
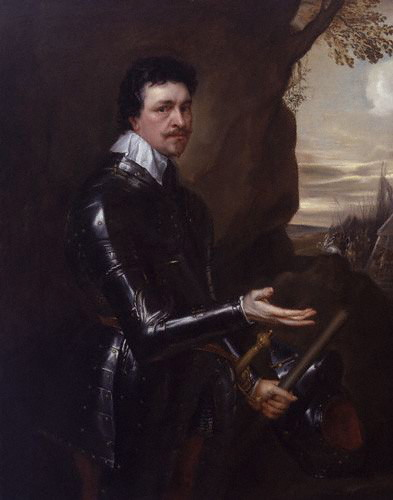
Thomas Wentworth, 1st Earl of Strafford in an Armour, 1639, another portrait by Sir Anthony van Dyck

The 1st Viscount Wentworth, as he had become, became a privy counsellor in November 1629. On 12 January 1632 he was made Lord Deputy of Ireland, arriving in Dublin on 23 July the following year. He had recently suffered the loss of his beloved second wife Arabella in childbirth. Despite his genuine grief for Arabella, his third marriage to Elizabeth Rhodes in 1632 was also a happy one; but through a strange lapse of judgement, he did not announce it publicly for almost a year, by which time damaging rumours about the presence of a young woman in his house (who was reputed to be his mistress) had gained wide circulation. Wedgwood remarks that it was typical of Wentworth to be oblivious to the bad impression which actions like this might make on the public. Gossip later linked his name with that of Eleanor Loftus, daughter-in-law of The 1st Viscount Loftus, Lord Chancellor of Ireland, but although a strong bond existed between them, and her death in 1639 caused him much grief, there is no evidence that their relationship went beyond friendship.

In his government here he proved to be an able ruler. "The lord deputy of Ireland", wrote Sir Thomas Roe to Elizabeth of Bohemia, "doth great wonders and governs like a king, and hath taught that kingdom to show us an example of envy, by having parliaments and knowing wisely how to use them." He reformed the administration, summarily dismissing the inefficient English officials. He succeeded in so manipulating the parliaments that he obtained the necessary grants, and secured their cooperation in various useful legislative enactments. He started a new victualling trade with Spain, promoted linen manufacture, and encouraged the development of the resources of the country in many directions. The Court of Castle Chamber, the Irish counterpart of the Star Chamber, which up to that time had only operated intermittently, was transformed into a regular and efficient part of the Irish administration.

Customs duties rose from a little over £25,000 in 1633–34 to £57,000 in 1637–38. Wentworth raised an army, put an end to piracy, imposed Arminian reforms onto the Calvinist-dominated Church of Ireland, and launched a campaign to win back Church lands lost during the Reformation. His strong administration reduced the tyranny of the wealthy over the poor. Yet these measures were all carried out by arbitrary methods which made them unpopular. Their aim was not the prosperity of the Irish but the benefit to the English exchequer, and Wentworth suppressed the trade in cloth "lest it should be a means to prejudice that staple commodity of England." Castle Chamber, like its model Star Chamber, was accused of brutal and arbitrary proceedings. Individual cases of unfairness included those of Robert Esmond, a ship's captain, and cousin of Laurence Esmonde, Lord Esmonde, accused of customs evasions, whom Wentworth was alleged to have assaulted, so causing his death, Lord Chancellor Loftus and Lord Mountnorris, the last of whom Wentworth caused to be sentenced to death to obtain the resignation of his office, and then pardoned. Promises of legislation such as the concessions known as 'The Graces' were not kept.

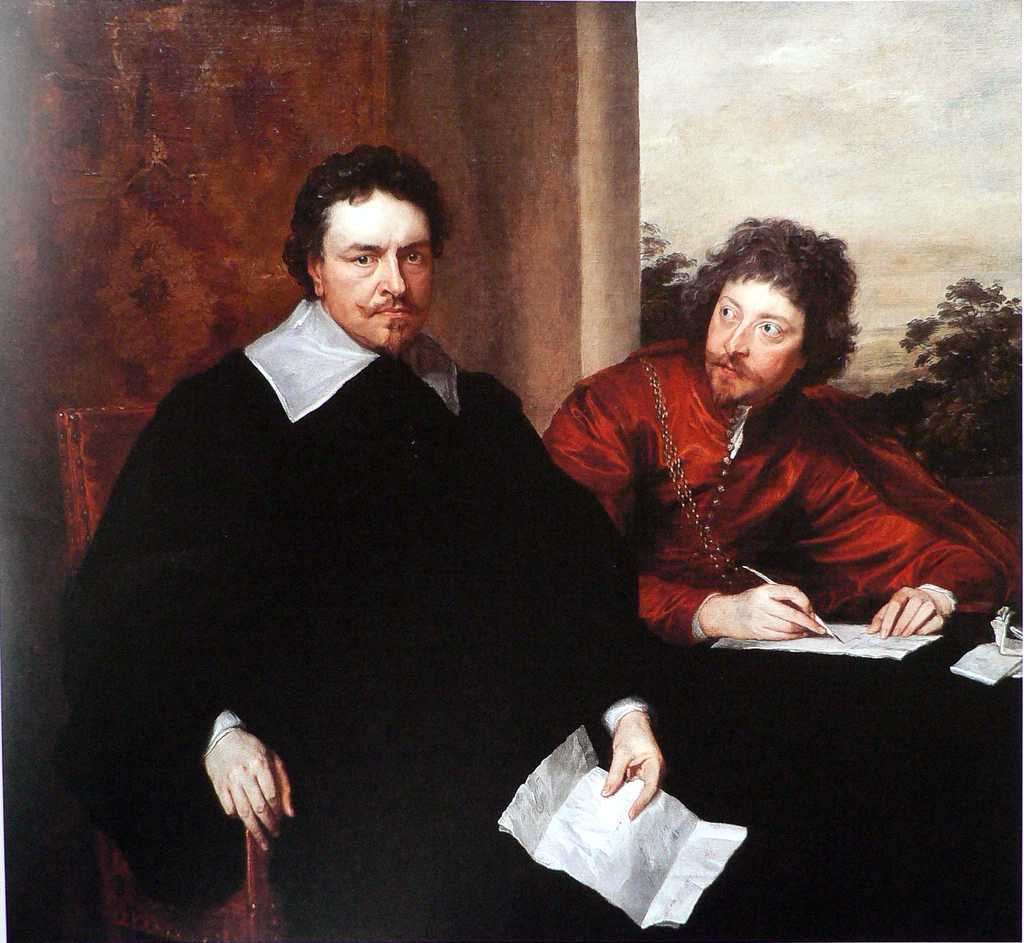
The Earl of Strafford with his secretary, Sir Philip Mainwaring

Wentworth ignored Charles' promise that no colonists would be awarded land, to the detriment of Catholic landholders, in Connaught. In 1635 he raked up an obsolete title—the grant in the 14th century of Connaught to Lionel of Antwerp, whose heir Charles was—and insisted upon the grand juries finding verdicts for the King. One county only, County Galway, resisted, and the confiscation of Galway was effected by the Court of Exchequer, while Wentworth fined the sheriff £1,000 for summoning such a jury, and cited the jurymen to the Castle Chamber to answer for their offence. In Ulster the arbitrary confiscation of the property of the city companies aroused dangerous animosity against the government. His actions in Galway led to a clash with the powerful Burke family, headed by the ageing Richard Burke, Earl of Clanricarde. Clanricarde's death was said by some to have been hastened by the clash: Wentworth, on hearing these reports, said he could hardly be blamed for the fact that Clanricarde was nearly seventy. It was, however, unwise to have made an enemy of the new Earl, Ulick Burke, 5th Earl of Clanricarde, who through his mother Frances Walsingham had powerful English connections: Clanricarde's half-brother, Robert Devereux, 3rd Earl of Essex, by 1641 was to become one of Wentworth's (who became Earl of Strafford in 1640) most implacable enemies.

Wentworth made many enemies in Ireland, but none more dangerous than Richard Boyle, Earl of Cork, the most powerful of the "New English" magnates. A more diplomatic man than Wentworth would no doubt have sought Cork's friendship, but Wentworth saw Cork's great power as a threat to the Crown's central authority, and was determined to curb it. He prosecuted Lord Cork in Castle Chamber for misappropriating the funds of Youghal College; and ordered him to take down the tomb of his first wife in St. Patrick's Cathedral, Dublin. Cork, a patient and implacable enemy, worked quietly for Wentworth's downfall, and in 1641 recorded calmly in his diary that Wentworth (by then Earl of Strafford) had been beheaded "as he well deserved".

Toward the native Irish, Wentworth had no notion of developing their qualities by a process of natural growth; his only hope for them lay in converting them into Englishmen as soon as possible. They must be made English in their habits, in their laws and in their religion. "I see plainly ... that, so long as this kingdom continues popish, they are not a people for the Crown of England to be confident of", he wrote. Although staunchly Protestant, he showed no desire to persecute Catholics: as J.P. Kenyon remarks, it was understood that so long as Catholics remained the great majority of the population, there would have to be a much larger degree of toleration than was necessary in England. He was prepared to give tacit recognition to the Catholic hierarchy, and even gave an interview to Archbishop Thomas Fleming of Dublin, whose homely face, plain dress and lack of ostentation made a poor impression on him.

Under Wentworth's patronage, the Werburgh Street Theatre, Ireland's first theatre, was opened by John Ogilby, a member of his household, and survived for several years despite the opposition of Archbishop James Ussher of Armagh. James Shirley, the English dramatist, wrote several plays for it, one with a distinctively Irish theme, and Landgartha, by Henry Burnell, the first known play by an Irish dramatist, was produced there in 1640.

Wentworth's heavy-handed approach did yield some improvements, as well as contribute to the strength of the royal administration in Ireland. His hindrance in 1634 of 'The Graces', a campaign for equality by Roman Catholics in the Parliament of Ireland, lost him goodwill but was based on fiscal and not religious principles. Wentworth regarded the proper management of Parliament as a crucial test of his success, and in the short term, his ruthless methods did produce results. Having settled on Nathaniel Catelyn as the most suitable Speaker, he coerced the voters of Dublin into returning him as member, and ordered the Commons to elect him Speaker. The Parliament of 1634/5 did pass some useful legislation: the Act against Fraudulent Conveyances remained in force into the 21st century. His second Parliament, however, having paid him abject compliments, began to attack his administration as soon as Wentworth left for England.

The future Duke of Ormond became Wentworth's chief friend and supporter. Wentworth planned large-scale confiscations of Catholic-owned land, both to raise money for the crown and to break the political power of the Irish Catholic gentry, a policy which Ormonde supported. Yet it infuriated Ormonde's relatives and drove many of them into opposition to Wentworth and ultimately into armed rebellion. In 1640, with Wentworth having been recalled to attend to the Second Bishops' War in England, Ormonde was made commander-in-chief of the forces in Ireland. Wedgwood concludes that whatever his intentions Wentworth/Strafford in Ireland achieved only one thing: to unite every faction in Ireland in their determination to be rid of him.

Wentworth's rule in Ireland made him more high-handed at court than ever. He had never been consulted on English affairs until February 1637 when King Charles asked Wentworth's opinion on a proposed interference in the affairs of the Continent. In reply, Wentworth assured Charles it would be unwise to undertake even naval operations till he had secured absolute power at home. He wished that Hampden and his followers "were well whipped into their right senses". The judges had given the King the right to levy ship-money, but, unless his majesty had "the like power declared to raise a land army, the Crown" seemed "to stand upon one leg at home, to be considerable but by halves to foreign princes abroad". When the Scottish Covenanters rebelled he advocated the most decided measures of repression, in February 1639 sending the King £2000 as his contribution to the expenses of the coming war, at the same time deprecating an invasion of Scotland before the English army was trained, and advising certain concessions in religion.

Wentworth apparently intended to put down roots in Ireland: in the late 1630s he was much occupied with building a mansion, Jigginstown Castle, near Naas, County Kildare. He is thought to have intended it to be his official residence where he could entertain the King, should he visit Ireland. The castle, which was to be built partly of red brick and partly of Kilkenny marble, would, had it been completed, have been probably the largest private house in Ireland, but after Wentworth's death, it quickly fell into ruin, although the ground floor still exists.

He made some efforts also to build up a network of family alliances in Ireland: his brother George, to whom he was close, married Anne Ruish, sister of Strafford's great friend Eleanor Loftus, and his sister Elizabeth married James Dillon, Earl of Roscommon. Roscommon, unlike most of the Anglo-Irish nobility, remained staunchly loyal to the King during the Civil War. His son Wentworth Dillon, 4th Earl of Roscommon, was named for his distinguished uncle, and grew up to be a poet of some distinction. Strafford seems to have taken some interest in his nephew's education, and he spent part of his childhood at his uncle's Yorkshire home.

== Recall and impeachment ==
Wentworth was recalled to England in September 1639. He was expected to help sort out the problems that were growing at home: namely, bankruptcy and war with the Scottish Covenanters, and became the King's principal adviser. Unaware how much opposition had developed in England during his absence, he recommended the calling of a parliament to support a renewal of the war, hoping that by the offer of a loan from the Privy Councillors, to which he contributed £20,000, he would save Charles from having to submit to the new parliament if it proved truculent.

The King created him Earl of Strafford in January 1640 (the Wentworth family seat of Wentworth Woodhouse lay in the hundred of Strafford (Strafforth) in the West Riding of Yorkshire) and in March he went to Ireland to hold an Irish parliament, where the Catholic vote secured a grant of subsidies to be used against the Presbyterian Scots. An Irish army was to be levied to assist in the coming war. When Strafford returned to England, he found that the Commons were holding back from a grant of supply, so he tried to enlist the peers on the side of the King, and persuaded Charles to be content with a smaller grant than he had originally asked for.

From April to August 1640, on his return from Ireland, Strafford occupied the newly built Leicester House, Westminster, in the absence of its owner Lord Leicester.

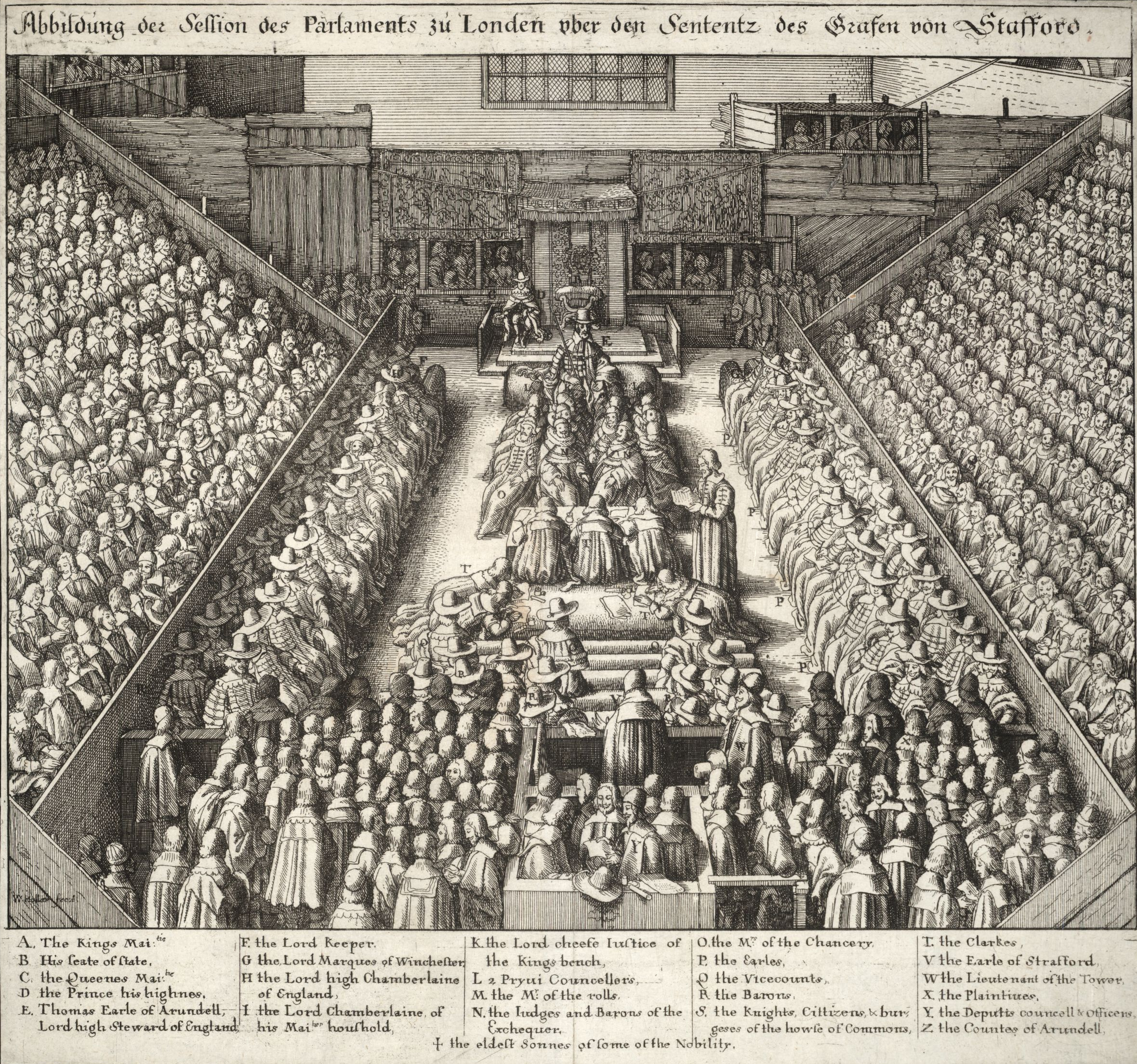
Detailed engraving of trial of Strafford by Wenceslas Hollar, labelling various people who were present

The Commons insisted on peace with the Scots. Charles, on the advice of—or perhaps by the treachery of—Henry Vane the Elder, returned to his larger demand of 12 subsidies; and on 9 May, at the privy council, Strafford, though reluctantly, voted for a dissolution. The same morning the Committee of Eight of the privy council met again. Vane and others were for a mere defence against invasion. Strafford's advice was the contrary. "Go on vigorously or let them alone ... go on with a vigorous war as you first designed, loose and absolved from all rules of government, being reduced to extreme necessity, everything is to be done that power might admit ... You have an army in Ireland you may employ here to reduce this kingdom". He tried to force the citizens of London to lend money, and supported a project for debasing the coinage and seizing bullion in the Tower of London (the property of foreign merchants). He also advocated the purchase of a loan from Spain by the offer of a future alliance. Strafford was now appointed to command the English army, and was made a Knight of the Garter, but he fell ill at a crucial moment. In the great council of peers, which assembled on 24 September at York, the struggle was given up, and Charles announced that he had issued writs for another parliament.

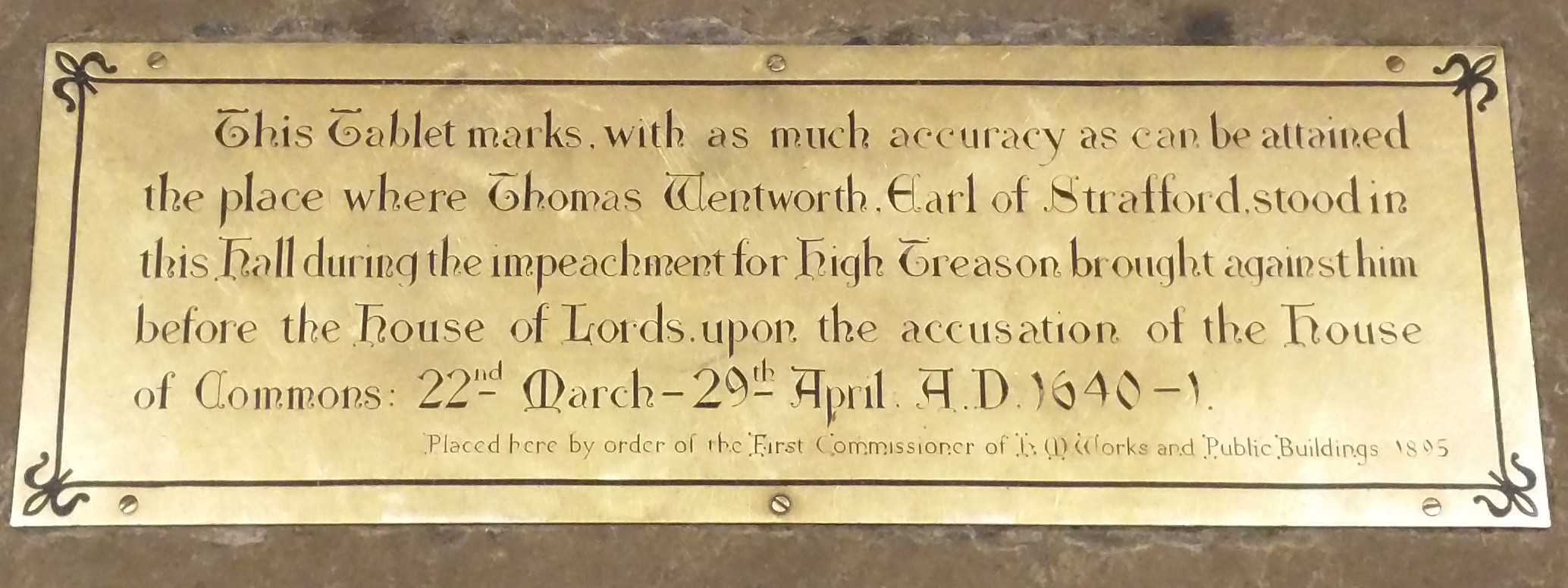
A plaque affixed to the floor of Westminster Hall commemorating Strafford's trial

By late 1640, there was no option but to call a new Parliament. The Long Parliament assembled on 3 November 1640, and Charles immediately summoned Strafford to London, promising that he "should not suffer in his person, honour or fortune". One of Parliament's first actions was to impeach Strafford for "high misdemeanours" regarding his conduct in Ireland. He arrived on 9 November and the next day asked Charles I to forestall his impeachment by accusing the leaders of the popular party of treasonable communications with the Scots. The plan having been betrayed, John Pym immediately took up the impeachment to the House of Lords on 11 November. Strafford came in person to confront his accusers, but was ordered to withdraw and taken into custody. On 25 November his preliminary charge was brought up, whereupon he was sent to the Tower of London, and, on 31 January 1641, the accusations in detail were presented. These were that Strafford had tried to subvert the fundamental laws of the kingdom. Much stress was laid on Strafford's reported words: "You have an army in Ireland you may employ here to reduce this kingdom".

== The failure of impeachment and the Bill of Attainder ==
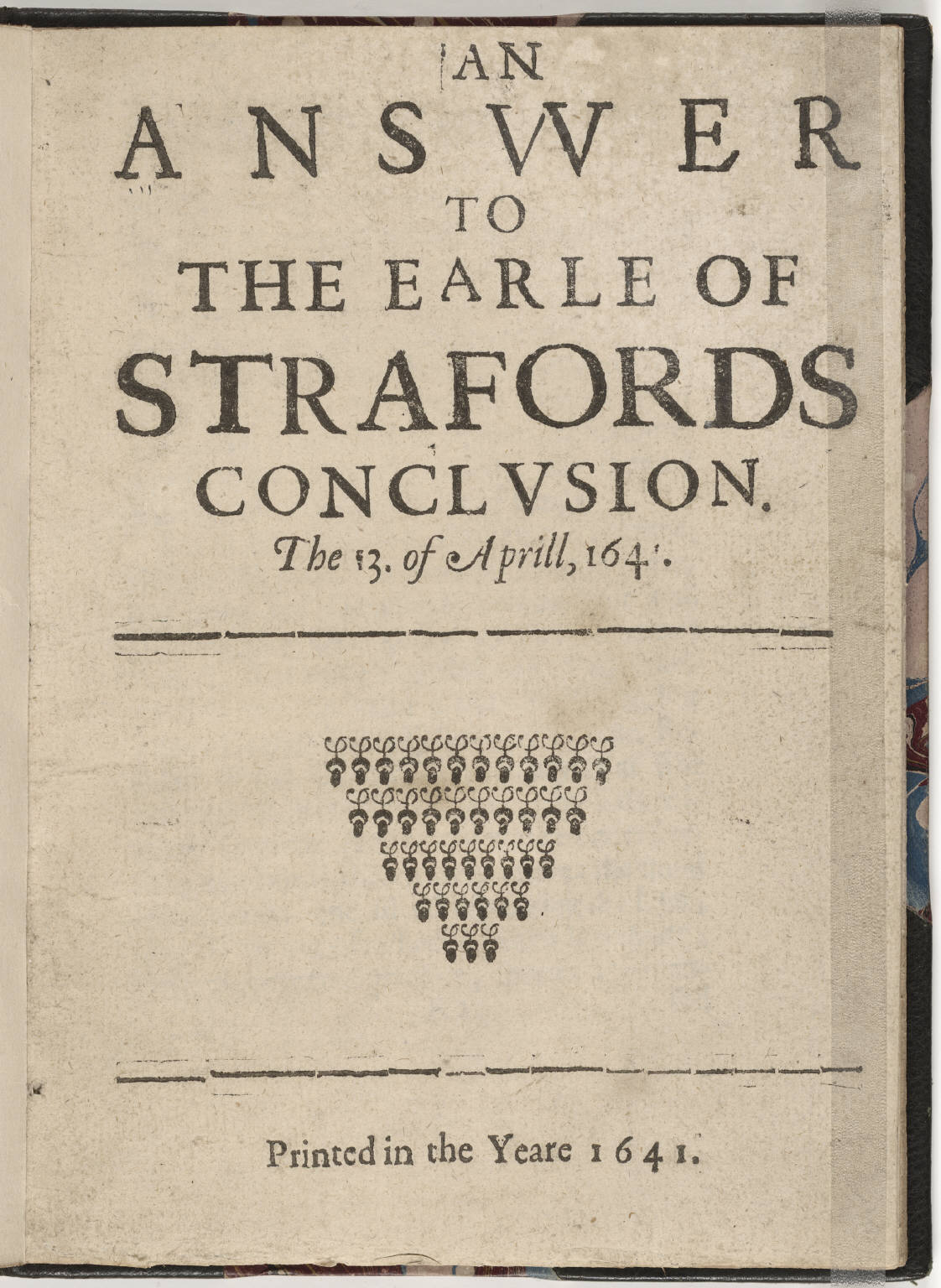
An Answer to the Earle of Strafords Conclusion, likely printed at London, April 1641

Earl of Strafford's Attainder Act 1640
- Act of Parliament
- Parliament of England
- Long title: An Act for the Attainder of Thomas Earl of Strafford for High Treason.
- Citation: 16 Cha. 1. c. 38
- Territorial extent: England and Wales

Dates
- Royal assent: 10 May 1641
- Commencement: 3 November 1640 (Note: Start of session.)
- Repealed: 7 January 1662
Other legislation
Repealed by	Strafford Attainder Act 1662

Status: Repealed

Text of statute as originally enacted

However tyrannical Strafford's earlier conduct may have been, his offence was outside the definition of high treason. Although a flood of complaints poured in from Ireland, and Strafford's many enemies there were happy to testify against him, none of them could point to any act which was treasonable, as opposed to high-handed. The copy of rough notes of Strafford's speech in the committee of the council, obtained from Sir Henry Vane the Younger, were validated by councillors who had been present on the occasion, including Henry Vane the Elder, who did ultimately corroborate them (but nearly disowned his own son for having found and leaked them in the first place), and partially by Algernon Percy, Earl of Northumberland. This was not evidence which would convict in a court of law, and all parties knew this. Strafford's words, particularly the crucial phrase this kingdom, had to be arbitrarily interpreted as referring to the subjection of England and not of Scotland, and were also spoken on a privileged occasion. Strafford took full advantage of the weak points in his attack on the evidence collected. Over and over Strafford pointed to the fundamental weakness in the prosecution: how could it be treason to carry out the King's wishes? The lords, his judges, were influenced in his favour. The impeachment failed on 10 April 1641. Pym and his allies increased public pressure, threatening members of Parliament unless they punished Strafford.

The Commons, therefore, feeling their victim slipping from their grasp, dropped the impeachment, and brought in and passed a bill of attainder on 21 April by a vote of 204 to 59. Owing to the opposition of the Lords, and Pym's own preference for the more judicial method, the procedure of impeachment was adhered to. Few of the Lords felt much personal liking for Strafford, but there were a fair number of "moderates", notably Francis Russell, Earl of Bedford, who thought that barring him from ever serving the King again was sufficient punishment. The families of his first two wives, the Cliffords and Holleses, used all their influence to gain a reprieve: even Denzil Holles, 1st Baron Holles, who was implacably hostile to the King, put aside political differences to plead for the life of his favourite sister's husband. Strafford might still have been saved but for Charles I's ill-advised conduct. A scheme to gain over the leaders of the parliament, and a scheme to seize the Tower of London and to liberate Strafford by force, were entertained concurrently and were mutually destructive. The revelation of the First Army Plot on 5 May 1641 caused the Lords to reject the submissions in defence of Strafford by Richard Lane and to pass the attainder. Strafford's enemies were implacable in their determination that he should die: in the Earl of Essex's phrase "stone dead hath no fellow", while the view of Oliver St. John was that Strafford should be regarded not a man, but as a dangerous animal who must be "knocked on the head". Nothing now remained but the King's signature.

Still, Strafford had served Charles with what the King felt was a high degree of loyalty, and Charles had a serious problem with signing Strafford's death warrant as a matter of conscience, especially as he had explicitly promised Strafford that, no matter what happened, he would not die. However, to refuse the will of Parliament on this matter could seriously threaten the monarchy. When he summoned the bishops to ask for their advice, they were divided. Some, like James Ussher, Archbishop of Armagh argued that the King could not in conscience break his promise to Strafford to spare him; others, like Bishop John Williams of Lincoln, took the contrary view that reasons of State permitted the King to break his word where a private citizen could not. Charles had, after the passing of the attainder by the Commons, for the second time assured Strafford "upon the word of a king, you shall not suffer in life, honour or fortune".

According to Cobbett's State Trials Strafford wrote releasing the King from his engagements and declaring his willingness to die to reconcile Charles to his subjects: "I do most humbly beseech you, for the preventing of such massacres as may happen by your refusal, to pass the bill; by this means to remove ... the unfortunate thing forth of the way towards that blessed agreement, which God, I trust, shall for ever establish between you and your subjects". David Hume notes an account from Thomas Carte that the letter was "entirely a forgery of the popular leaders", although Hume states his own fidelity to the "common way of telling this story", calling Carte's evidence a "hearsay of a hearsay".

The King did not release the letter to Parliament. Meanwhile, violent mobs threatened the palace with harm to the queen and her children. The King's inept efforts to overpower Parliament with military force were revealed by Pym and caused irresistible pressure. Charles gave his assent on 10 May, remarking sadly "My Lord Strafford's condition is happier than mine". Accounts of Strafford's reaction when he was told that he must die differ: by one account he took the news stoically; according to another he was deeply distressed, and said bitterly "Put not your trust in princes". Archbishop Laud wrote that the King's abandonment of Strafford proved him to be "a mild and gracious prince, that knows not how to be, or be made, great".

== Death and aftermath ==
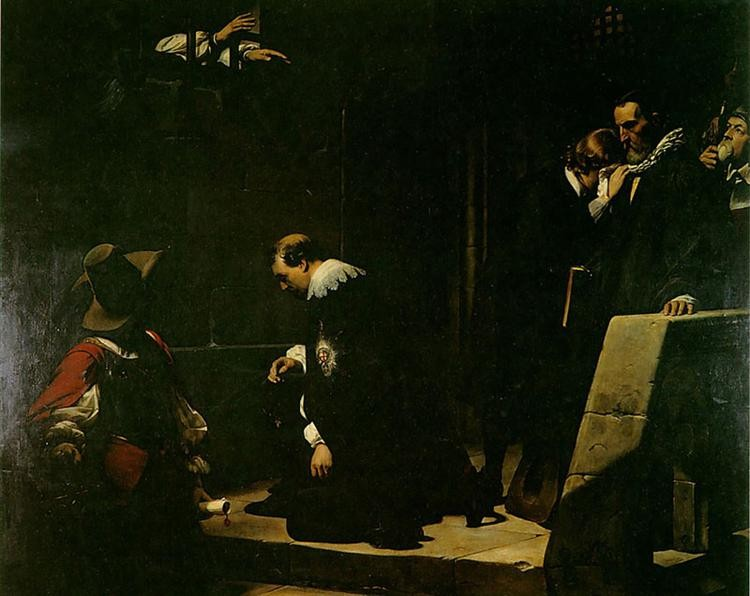
Strafford Led to Execution, by Paul Delaroche, oil-on-canvas, 1835, depicts Laud giving his blessing to the Earl of Strafford

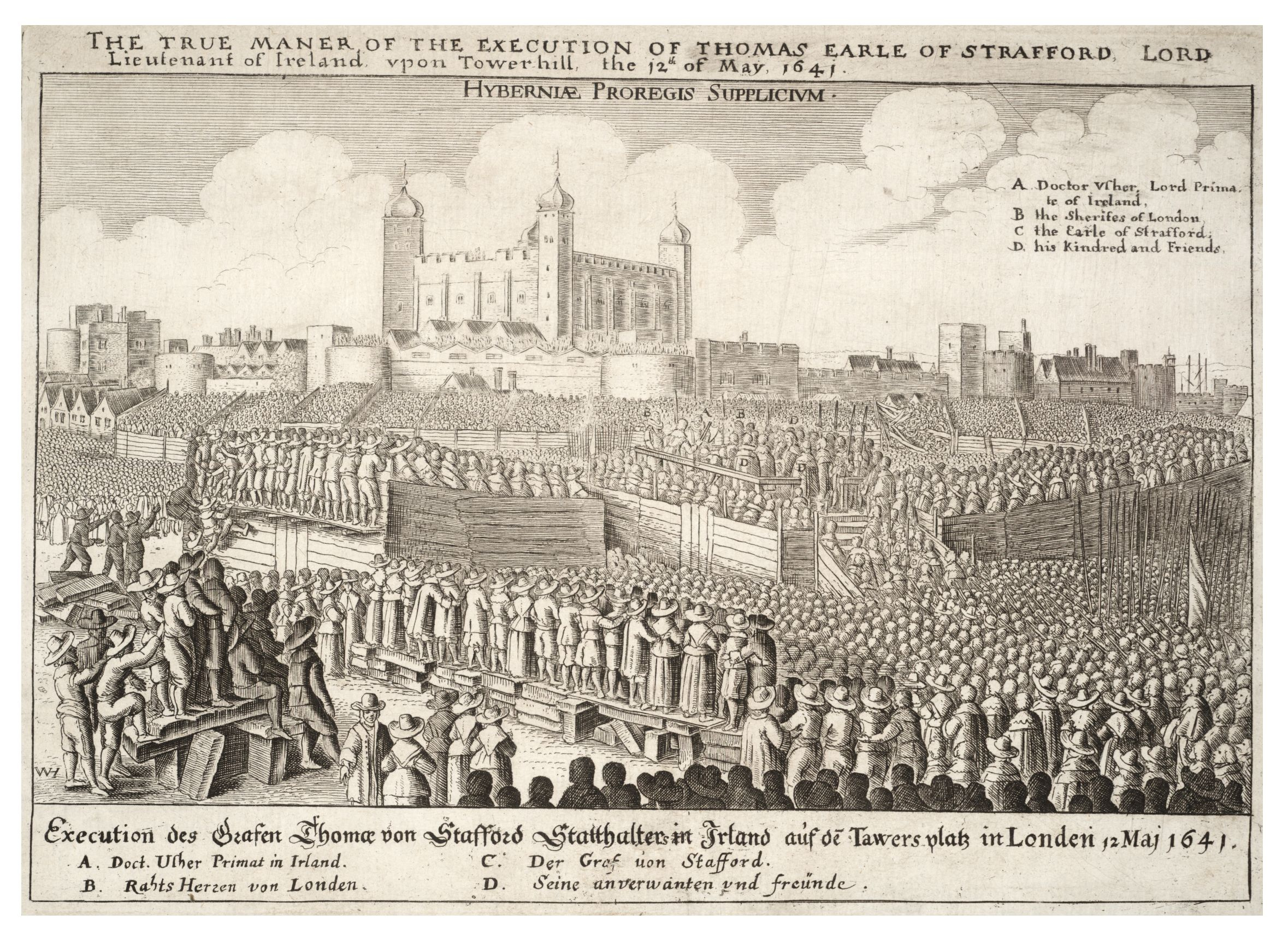
An engraving by Wenceslas Hollar depicting from a distance the execution of Strafford, with significant persons labelled

Strafford met his fate on 12 May 1641 at Tower Hill, receiving the blessing of Archbishop Laud (who went on to be likewise imprisoned in the Tower, and executed on 10 January 1645). He was executed before a crowd estimated, probably with some exaggeration, at 300,000 on 12 May 1641 (as this number was roughly the population of London at the time, the crowd is likely to have been a good deal smaller). As the common hangman of London, Richard Brandon carried out Strafford's execution, and incidentally also of Archbishop Laud in January 1645.

Following news of Strafford's execution, Ireland rose in sanguinary rebellion in October 1641, which led to more bickering between King and Parliament, this time over the raising of an army. Any hope that Strafford's death would avert the coming crisis soon vanished: Wedgwood quotes the anonymous protest "They promised us that all should be well if my Lord Strafford's head were off, since when there is nothing better". Many of Strafford's Irish enemies, like Lord Cork, found that his removal had put their estates, and even their lives, at risk. When Charles I himself was executed eight years later, among his last words were that God had permitted his execution as punishment for his consenting to Strafford's death: "that unjust sentence which I suffered to take effect". In 1660, the House of Lords voted to expunge the record of Strafford's attainder from its official Journal, with the intention of repudiating its legal validity.

== Assessment ==
In the course of his career, he made many enemies, who pursued him, with a remarkable mixture of fear and hatred, to his death. Yet Strafford was capable of inspiring strong friendships in private life: at least three men who served him in Ireland, Christopher Wandesford, George Radcliffe and Guildford Slingsby, remained his loyal friends to the end. Wentworth's last letter to Slingsby before his execution shows an emotional warmth with which he is not often credited. Sir Thomas Roe speaks of him as "Severe abroad and in business, and sweet in private conversation; retired in his friendships but very firm; a terrible judge and a strong enemy". He was a good husband and a devoted father. His appearance is described by Sir Philip Warwick: "In his person he was of a tall stature, but stooped much in the neck. His countenance was cloudy whilst he moved or sat thinking, but when he spoke, either seriously or facetiously, he had a lightsome and a very pleasant air; and indeed whatever he then did he performed very gracefully". He himself jested on his own "bent and ill-favoured brow", Lord Exeter replying that had he been "cursed with a meek brow and an arch of white hair upon it, he would never have governed Ireland nor Yorkshire". Despite his terrifying manner, there is no real evidence that he was physically violent: even the most serious charge against him, that he ill-treated Robert Esmonde, causing his death, rests on disputed testimony.

== Family ==
Strafford was married three times:

- Margaret Clifford (died 1622), daughter of Francis Clifford, 4th Earl of Cumberland.
- Arabella Holles (died October 1631), daughter of John Holles, 1st Earl of Clare. Married in February 1625. they had issue including:
  - William Wentworth, 2nd Earl of Strafford
  - Anne, born October 1627, who married Edward Watson, 2nd Baron Rockingham
  - Arabella, born October 1630, who married Justin McCarthy, Viscount Mountcashel.
- Elizabeth Rhodes, daughter of Sir Godfrey Rhodes. Married in October 1632; she died in 1688.

Strafford's honours were forfeited by his attainder, but his only son, William, who was born on 8 June 1626, received them all by a fresh grant from Charles I on 1 December 1641. In 1662 Parliament reversed his father's attainder, and William, already 1st Earl of Strafford of the second creation, became also 2nd earl of the first creation in succession to his father.

Strafford and Arabella's two daughters outlived him: Through his daughter Anne, Strafford was the ancestor of the prominent eighteenth-century statesman Charles Watson-Wentworth, 2nd Marquess of Rockingham. Strafford had a daughter, Margaret, with his third wife. The hatred felt by so many for Strafford did not extend to his widow and children, who were generally regarded with compassion: even at the height of the Civil War Parliament treated "that poor unfortunate family" with consideration.

== Portrayals ==
Thomas was the subject of a verse play by the poet Robert Browning entitled Strafford (1837).

Strafford was portrayed by Patrick Wymark in the historical drama film Cromwell (1970).

== Ancestry ==
Ancestors of Thomas Wentworth, 1st Earl of Strafford

8. William Wentworth (1490–1549)
4. Thomas Wentworth, High Sheriff of York (b.1520)
9. Catherine Beeston
2. William Wentworth, 1st Baronet (b.1563)
10. Sir William Gascoigne VIII
5. Margaret Gascoigne
11. Beatrice Tempest
1. Thomas Wentworth, 1st Earl of Strafford
12. Richard Atkinson, Mayor of Oxford
6. Sir Robert Atkinson, barrister
13. Agnes
3. Anne Atkinson
14. Humphrey Ashfield
7. Joyce Ashfield
15. Anne Conway

== Sources ==
- Abbott, Jacob (1876), "Chapter: Downfall of Strafford and Laud", Charles I, Makers of History Series, New York and London: Harper and Brothers
- Asch, Ronald G. (2004), "Wentworth, Thomas, first earl of Strafford (1593–1641)", in Matthew, Colin; Harrison, Brian (eds.), Oxford Dictionary of National Biography, vol. 56, New York: Oxford University Press, pp. 142–157, ISBN 0-19-861408-X
- Castle, Egerton (1893), English book-plates: ancient and modern, G. Bell & Sons, p. p 59
- Gardiner, Samuel Rawson (1899), "WENTWORTH, THOMAS, first Earl of Strafford (1593–1641)", in Lee, Sidney (ed.), Dictionary of National Biography, vol. 60, London: Smith Elder & Co, pp. 268–283
- Healy, Simon Mark (2015): “Crown Revenue and the Political Culture of Early Stuart England”. Thesis submitted for the degree of Doctor of Philosophy in the University of London at Birkbeck College
- Kearney, Hugh F. (1989), Strafford in Ireland, 1633–41: a study in absolutism (2 ed.), Cambridge University Press, p. xxxiv, ISBN 978-0-521-37822-2
- Kenyon, J.P. (1966), The Stuarts (Reissue ed.), Fontana, p. 97
- Orr, D. A. (2004). "Lane, Sir Richard (bap. 1584, d. 1650)". Oxford Dictionary of National Biography (online ed.). Oxford University Press. doi:10.1093/ref:odnb/15996. (Subscription, Wikipedia Library access or UK public library membership required.)
- Sharpe, Kevin (1996), The Personal Rule of Charles 1
- Upham, Charles Wentworth (1844), "Life of Sir Henry Vane, Fourth Governor of Massachusetts", in Sparks, Jared (ed.), Library of American Biography, pp. 187–198
- Wedgwood, C.V. (1961), Thomas Wentworth, 1st Earl of Strafford: A Revaluation, London a much more hostile perspective than her first edition
- Wedgwood, C.V. (1966), The King's War, Fontana Reissue, pp. 74–5
- Wedgwood, C.V. (1983), The Trial of Charles 1 (Reissue ed.), Penguin Books, p. 190

Attribution:

Parliament of England
Preceded by Sir Richard Gargrave; Sir John Savile	Member of Parliament for Yorkshire; 1614–1622; With: Sir John Savile 1614; Lord George Calvert 1621–1622	Succeeded by Sir Thomas Savile; Sir John Savile
Preceded by George Shilleto; Sir Edwin Sandys, jnr	Member of Parliament for Pontefract; 1624; With: Sir John Jackson	Succeeded by Sir John Jackson; Richard Beaumont
Preceded by Sir Thomas Savile; Sir John Savile	Member of Parliament for Yorkshire; 1625; With: Thomas Fairfax	Succeeded by Sir John Savile; Sir William Constable, 1st Baronet
Preceded by Sir John Savile; Sir William Constable, 1st Baronet	Member of Parliament for Yorkshire; 1628; With: Henry Belasyse	Succeeded by Sir Henry Savile, Bt; Henry Belasyse
Honorary titles
Preceded by John Savile	Custos Rotulorum of the West Riding of Yorkshire; 1616–1626	Succeeded by Sir John Savile
Political offices
Preceded by The Earl of Sunderland	Lord Lieutenant of Yorkshire; 1628–1641	Succeeded by The Viscount Savile
Preceded by The Lord Savile	Custos Rotulorum of the West Riding of Yorkshire; 1630–1641	Succeeded by The Viscount Savile
Preceded by Lords Justices	Lord Deputy of Ireland; 1633–1640	Succeeded by The Earl of Leicester (Lord Lieutenant)
Preceded by Lords Justices	Lord Lieutenant of Ireland; 1640–1641	Succeeded by The Earl of Leicester (Lord Lieutenant)
Peerage of England
New creation	Earl of Strafford; 1st creation 1640–1641	Vacant Attainted Title next held by William Wentworth
New creation	Baron Raby; 1640–1641	Vacant Attainted Title next held by William Wentworth
New creation	Viscount Wentworth; 1629–1641	Vacant Attainted Title next held by William Wentworth
New creation	Baron Wentworth; 1628–1641	Vacant Attainted Title next held by William Wentworth
Baronetage of England
Preceded by William Wentworth	Baronet of Wentworth Woodhouse; 1614–1641	Attainted
