= Church of St Helen, Denton =

Anglican church in North Yorkshire, England

Church of St Helens, Denton
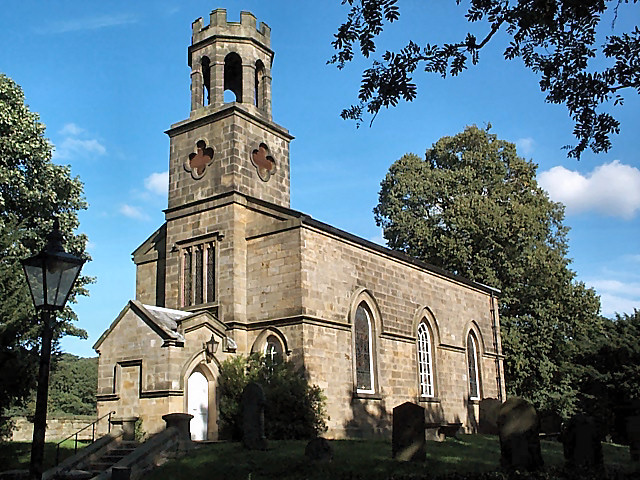
- St Helen's parish church, Denton
- Church of St Helens, Denton
- 53.936°N 1.7807°W
- OS grid reference: SE 14488 48918
- Location: Denton, North Yorkshire
- Country: England
- Denomination: Church of England

History
- Status: Parish church
- Dedication: St Helen

Architecture
- Functional status: Active
- Completed: 1776

Administration
- Diocese: Leeds
- Archdeaconry: Richmond and Craven
- Deanery: Harrogate
- Benefice: Washburn and Mid-Wharfe
- Parish: Weston with Denton

Clergy
- Vicar: Reverend Thomas McCaulay

Listed Building – Grade II*
- Designated: 22 November 1966
- Reference no.: 1174421

The Church of St Helen, Denton is a parish church in the hamlet of Denton, near Otley, in North Yorkshire, England. The church was built in 1776 by the architect John Carr, who constructed it in the Gothic style, whereas he usually favoured the Classic style in his architecture. The church was built around a picture window taken from the chapel that it supplanted on the Denton Hall estate. The picture window still exists and is noted for being the only complete picture window by the artist Henry Gyles. A second piece of painted glass exists in the church, by the glass-painted William Peckitt. Whilst the church it is not a consecrated structure, services can take place there, and it is popular with people marrying due to its location close to a reception venue nearby.

== History ==
The Church of St Helen was built in 1776 by John Carr of York in the Gothic style; an architectural style that Carr made little use of. It was specially built around a picture window taken from the old chapel-of-ease which, stood next to Denton Hall. The old chapel was last used in 1772 and demolished a few years later. The picture window, a type of stained glass where the image is painted onto the glass, was the work of the artist Henry Gyles, who painted it in 1700, as commissioned by the then Lord Fairfax. Ralph Thoresby described it as "...the noblest painted glass in Northern England." The glass depicts King David playing a harp, Saint Cecilia and a choir. God is represented in a sunburst at the top of the window as a tetragrammaton. The painting is said to have been influenced by an engraving by Johannes Sadeler, and is thought to be the only glass painting of its size by Henry Gyles, anywhere in the world.

A second piece of painted glass is next to the Gyles piece in the east window, which is decorated with flowers and fruits. The second glass was painted by William Peckitt.

The church structure is constructed from locally quarried stone, and has a grey slate roof. There are no windows in the northern wall of the church, but recesses exist in the places where windows would normally be sited. The lych-gate leading into the churchyard was a later addition, and is constructed largely from timber with a slate roof. The nave is without aisles, and is in essence, one large open space. The tower is at the west and forms three stages described as "pediment[ed] at the west end and rises to a cube shaped stage." The porch is a single storey edifice with double doors which face onto the south side.

The church was dedicated to St Helen, the mother of Constantine the Great. St Helen was chosen because of her association with the "County of York"; her son spent at least a year in the area fighting the Picts. The church, and its predecessor chapel, were believed to have been constructed close to Denton Hall to allow the Fairfax and Ibbetson families to worship there instead of having to travel in to Otley. The churchyard contains several graves that pre-date the church's construction (such as the members of the Fairfax family), having been moved there from the grounds of Denton Hall. Whilst religious services are able to be carried out at the church, it has not been consecrated. It remains popular with people getting married due to its location close to a popular wedding reception venue nearby. Despite the parish only having a weekly attendance of 27, they returned 22 weddings in 2016, 19 of which, were at Denton.

=== Memorials ===
- A memorial to Sir Charles Ibbetson (Baron Rookwood) (1779–1839), was unveiled in 1842 by Joseph Bentley Leyland
- A memorial commemorates nine members of the locality who died in the First World War

== Parish and benefice ==
The church was donated to Diocese of Ripon in 1867, becoming the parish church for the newly created ecclesiastical Parish of Denton. Before then, it acted as a chapel-of-ease for the area. By 1996, the parish of Denton had been subsumed into the parish of Weston, to become Weston with Denton. In 2008, the church was joined with those at Fewston, Blubberhouses, Leathley and Farnley to become the United Benefice of Washburn and Mid-Wharfe in 2008. The church is now in the Diocese of Leeds.

== See also ==
- Grade II* listed churches in North Yorkshire (district)
- Listed buildings in Denton, North Yorkshire
