= Cotton Gargrave =

16th-century English politician

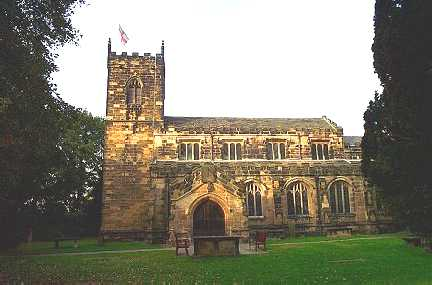
Wragby Church, Nostell Priory, Burial place of Sir Cotton Gargrave and father Sir Thomas Gargrave

Sir Cotton Gargrave (1540–1588) was an English landowner and politician who sat in the House of Commons in 1571 and 1572.

== Early life ==
Gargrave was the son of Sir Thomas Gargrave, High Sheriff of Yorkshire. He resided at Nostell Priory and at Kingsley, Yorkshire.

== Political career ==
In the northern rebellion of 1569, Gargrave commanded a force of 200 men from the West Riding of Yorkshire. He was elected Member of Parliament for Boroughbridge in 1571 and 1572. In 1583 he was appointed High Sheriff of Yorkshire and knighted in 1585. He was Custos Rotulorum of the West Riding of Yorkshire from 1584 to 1588. In his later years, he was forced to mortgage many of the extensive properties left him by his wealthy father.

== Family ==
Gargrave married firstly Bridget Fairfax, daughter of Sir William Fairfax of Steeton, West Yorkshire, and High Sheriff of Yorkshire. He married secondly Agnes (or Anne) Waterton, daughter of Sir Thomas Waterton of Walton and Sandal, Yorkshire.

He was a friend of Elizabeth's ambassador to Scotland, Thomas Randolph, and invited him to Nostell in May 1586.

Over the years, the Gargrave family earned what one observer called a reputation for romantic entanglements "remarkable for crime and misfortune." His wife became embroiled in lawsuits after his death. Thanks to ongoing lawsuits and ill-considered liaisons, "the whole family sunk into obscurity." His son Thomas by his first wife was executed for the murder of a servant boy. His son Richard by his second wife inherited an enormous patrimony from the Gargrave estates in Yorkshire, but dissipated it by drinking, gambling and extravagance and was eventually reduced to riding with the pack horses and died with his head on a pack saddle in an old inn. Among his daughters; Elizabeth, married William Fenwick of Stanton, Northumberland, Anne married Peter Venables, MP and secondly the equerry Sir Edward Bushell, and Mary was a Maid of Honour to Anne of Denmark.

Political offices
Preceded by Francis Wortley	Custos Rotulorum of the West Riding of Yorkshire; 1584–1588	Succeeded by John Savile
