= Thomas Stockdale (MP for Knaresborough) =

English Political Figure and Yorkshire Landowner

Thomas Stockdale of Bilton Park (died 25 December 1653) supported the Parliamentary cause during the English Civil War, and sat as a member for Knaresborough in the Long Parliament from 1645. He was also a Yorkshire magistrate, who was closely allied to the Fairfaxs and was a bailiff or agent for Lord Fairfax.

Stockdale married Margaret, second daughter of Sir William Parsons, an Elizabethan commissioner of plantations in Ireland. they had issue that included Elizabeth (d. 25 October 1694).

== Notes ==
Parliament of England
| Preceded by Sir William Constable, Bt | Member of Parliament for Knaresborough; 1645–1653; With: Sir William Constable, Bt | Succeeded by Unrepresented in the Barebones Parliament |
