= Sir William Wentworth, 1st Baronet =

English landowner

Sir William Wentworth (1562–1614) was an English landowner.

He was born in 1562, the son of Thomas Wentworth and Margaret Gascoigne or Gascoyne, heiress of Gawthorpe. His sister was Elizabeth Wentworth who was the mother of the heir Christopher Danby (1582–1624). A story was told of Wentworth's visit to Bolling Hall and a vision concerning St Ann's well at Buxton.

His homes were Gawthorpe Hall (demolished) near Harewood House, and Wentworth Woodhouse, near Rotherham. He became High Sheriff of Yorkshire, and acquired a baronet's title on 20 June 1611.

== Marriage and family ==
He married Anne Atkins, daughter of Sir Robert Atkins of Stowell, Gloucestershire. Their eight sons included:

- Thomas Wentworth, 1st Earl of Strafford
- William Wentworth
- George Wentworth (of Wentworth Woodhouse)

Baronetage of England
New creation	Baronet (of Wentworth Woodhouse); 1611–1614	Succeeded by Thomas Wentworth
