= Richard Gargrave =

English politician

Sir Richard Gargrave (1573–1638) was an English landowner and politician who sat in the House of Commons at various times between 1597 and 1609.

Gargrave was the son of Sir Cotton Gargrave and his second wife Agnes Waterton, daughter of Thomas Waterton of Walton. He was at Peterhouse, Cambridge in about 1591 and at Inner Temple in 1591. He succeeded to the family estates worth £3,500 p.a when his elder half-brother Thomas Gargrave was executed for the murder of a servant boy. The estates consisted of eleven manors and other property. In 1597, he was elected Member of Parliament for Aldborough. He was a J.P. for the West Riding of Yorkshire and was knighted in 1603. From 1604 to 1605 he was High Sheriff of Yorkshire. He was elected MP for Yorkshire in 1606 when Francis Clifford was ennobled.

Gargrave was given to drinking and gambling. To fund his extravagance he gradually disposed of all his lands. "He who could once ride on his own land from Wakefield to Doncaster, was reduced at last to travel to London with the packhorses, and was found dead in an old hostelry, with his head upon a pack-saddle," wrote Richard Vickerman Taylor in his Yorkshire Anecdotes. Echoed the genealogical publisher John Burke: "The memory of his extravagance and his vices yet lingers about Kingsley."

Gargrave married Catherine Danvers, daughter of Sir John Danvers and had two daughters. Mary married Sir Robert Carr of Sleaford.

Parliament of England
Preceded by Andrew Fisher; Edward Hancock	Member of Parliament for Aldborough; 1597; With: Henry Bellasis	Succeeded by Sir Edward Cecil; Richard Theakston
Preceded by Sir Francis Clifford; John Savile	Member of Parliament for Yorkshire; 1606–1611; With: John Savile	Succeeded by Sir Thomas Wentworth; John Savile
