= Thomas Savile, 1st Earl of Sussex =

English politician

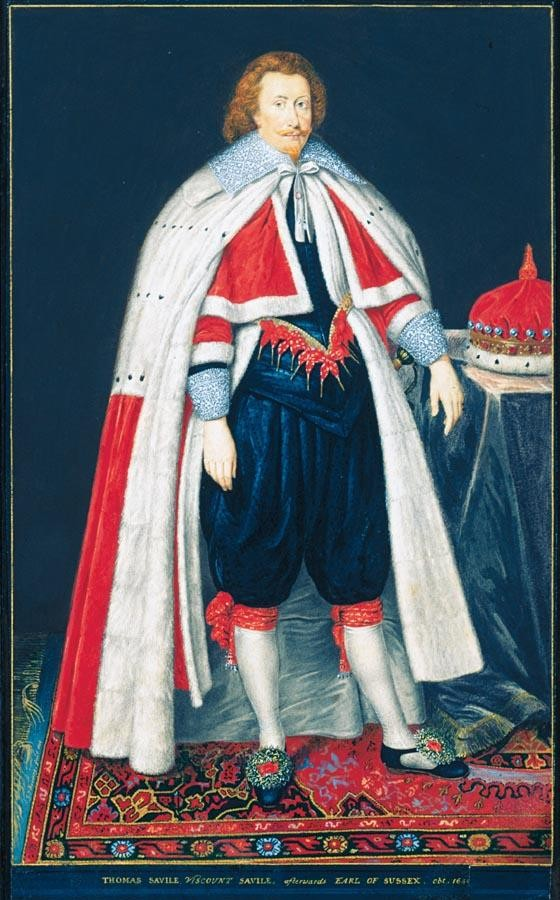
Portrait of Thomas Savile

Thomas Savile, 1st Earl of Sussex (bap. 14 September 1590 – c. 1659) was an English politician.

== Biography ==
Thomas Savile was the son of John Savile, 1st Baron Savile of Pomfret, by his second wife, Elizabeth Carey, sister of Henry Cary, 1st Viscount Falkland, and daughter of Sir Edward Carey of Aldenham, Hertfordshire. He was baptized 14 September 1590 at Doddington Pigot, Lincolnshire.

Savile was elected to the House of Commons as member for Yorkshire in 1624. In the Parliament of 1624 he became an opponent of Thomas Wentworth, afterwards earl of Strafford—the rivalry between the Saviles and the Wentworths having long been a feature of the history of Yorkshire. Savile attached himself to the Duke of Buckingham and he was created Viscount Savile of Castlebar in the peerage of Ireland in 1628. On the death of his father two years later, he became the 2nd Baron Savile of Pomfret.

His growing enmity to Strafford led him into violent opposition to the government as the earl's power increased, and in 1640 he entered into correspondence with the Scots, to whom he sent a promise of support to which he forged the signatures of six peers. He was appointed Lord President of the Council of the North in succession to Strafford, but after Strafford's fall he went over to the Royalist party, in whose interest he exerted his influence in Yorkshire in a manner that brought upon him the displeasure of the parliament in 1642. His efforts to exonerate himself led to his being suspected by the Royalists, and to his arrest, while his residence, Howley Hall, was sacked by the Earl of Newcastle, the Royalist general.

Having been pardoned by Charles, whom Savile attended at Oxford, he was created earl of Sussex in 1644; but his efforts to promote peace on terms distasteful to the king brought him again into disfavour, and, in 1645, he was imprisoned and accused of high treason. Escaping from this charge on the ground of his privilege as a peer, he went to London and again ingratiated himself with the popular party.

Intriguing simultaneously with both parties, he continued to play a double game with considerable skill, although he suffered imprisonment in 1645 for accusing Denzil Holles and Bulstrode Whitelocke of treachery in negotiations with the king, and was heavily fined. After this he retired into private life at Howley Hall, where he died about 1659. He was succeeded in the earldom of Sussex by his son James.

== Marriages ==
Savile married firstly Frances Sondes (1592–c. 1634), the daughter of Thomas Sondes (1544–1593) of Throwley, Kent, by Margaret Brooke (1563–1621), the youngest daughter of William Brooke, 10th Baron Cobham. Frances Sondes' first husband, Sir John Leveson, son and heir of Sir John Leveson, died of plague in December 1613, predeceasing his father and leaving two infant daughters, Christian and Frances. There were no issue of Savile's first marriage.

Savile married secondly, shortly after November 1640, Anne Villiers, only daughter of Christopher Villiers, 1st Earl of Anglesey, by Elizabeth Sheldon, the daughter of Thomas Sheldon.

Anne Villiers remarried to Richard Pelson from St. George's-in-the-Fields, Middlesex.

Political offices
Preceded by The Earl of Strafford	Lord Lieutenant of Yorkshire; 1641	Succeeded by The Earl of Essex
Preceded by The Earl of Strafford	Custos Rotulorum of the West Riding of Yorkshire; 1641–1646	Vacant English Civil War Title next held by The Lord Fairfax of Cameron
Preceded by Sir Henry Vane	Treasurer of the Household; 1641–1649	Vacant English Commonwealth Title next held by Sir Frederick Cornwallis
Peerage of England
New creation	Earl of Sussex; 1644 – c. 1659	Succeeded by James Savile
Preceded by John Savile	Baron Savile of Pomfret; 1630 – c. 1659	Succeeded by James Savile
Peerage of Ireland
New creation	Viscount Savile; 1628 – c. 1659	Succeeded by James Savile
