= Listed buildings in Denton, North Yorkshire =

Denton is a civil parish in the county of North Yorkshire, England. It contains 16 listed buildings that are recorded in the National Heritage List for England. Of these, one is listed at Grade I, the highest of the three grades, one is at Grade II*, the middle grade, and the others are at Grade II, the lowest grade. The parish contains the village of Denton and the surrounding countryside. The most important building in the parish is Denton Hall, which is listed, together with associated structures. The other listed buildings include houses, farmhouses and farm buildings, two well-heads, a church, a bridge, a former school and a telephone kiosk.

== Key ==
Grade	Criteria
I	Buildings of exceptional interest, sometimes considered to be internationally important
II*	Particularly important buildings of more than special interest
II	Buildings of national importance and special interest

== Buildings ==
Name and location	Photograph	Date	Notes	Grade
Dunkirk; 53.95415°N 1.76623°W		Mid to late 17th century	The house is in gritstone with quoins and a stone slate roof. There are two storeys, three bays and a rear outshut. The central doorway has quoined jambs, and the windows are chamfered and mullioned with three sashes. Above the doorway is an oval chamfered window.	II
Willow Hill; 53.94466°N 1.77761°W	—	Mid to late 17th century	A gritstone house on a plinth, with quoins, and a stone slate roof with gable copings and shaped kneelers. There are two storeys and four bays The doorway has chamfered jambs and cambered lintel. Above it is a blocked chamfered round-headed window, and the other windows have chamfered mullions, with some mullions removed.	II
Hathenshaw Farmhouse; 53.94761°N 1.79818°W		Early to mid 18th century	The farmhouse is in gritstone, with quoins, and a stone slate roof with gable copings and shaped kneelers. There are two storeys and three bays, the middle bay projecting at the rear and flanked by outshuts. In the centre is an open gabled porch, and the windows have flat-fronted mullions at the front, and chamfered mullions at the rear. The door to an outshut has chamfered quoined jambs, and a large chamfered lintel cut to a flattened triangular head.	II
Lane End Farmhouse and barn 53.94565°N 1.78986°W	—	Early to mid 18th century	The farmhouse and barn are in gritstone, with quoins, and a stone slate roof with gable coping and a shaped kneeler on the left. There are two storeys and the house has two bays, a doorway with a plain surround, and mullioned windows with most mullions missing. The barn to the left has three bays, and contains a central cart entrance with a cambered arch and quoined jambs, and byre doors.	II
Denton Hall, walls and railings 53.93423°N 1.77664°W		1772–1776	A country house designed by John Carr and later used for other purposes, it is in stone with hipped grey slate roofs. It consists of a main block with two storeys and basement, and fronts of nine and seven bays, linked by curving single-storey corridors to flanking pavilions with two storeys and fronts of three and four bays. The middle three bays of the south front contain four giant Ionic columns with a cornice and a modillioned pediment, flanked by a deep modillioned eaves cornice and a balustraded parapet. The windows are sashes in architraves, those in the ground floor with pediments. The pavilions have wooden cupolas with Doric columns and an entablature with a lead dome, the left one with a weathervane. In front of the main block are forecourt walls with wrought iron gates and railings.	I
1–3 School Row; 53.93706°N 1.78286°W		Late 18th century	A row of gritstone houses with quoins and a stone slate roof. There are two storeys and four bays. The doorways have tie-stone jambs, and the windows are sashes.	II
The Fountain; 53.93683°N 1.78330°W		Late 18th century (probable)	A well-head, now disused, in gritstone, about 1.5 metres (4 ft 11 in) high. It consists of a monolithic apple-shaped stone basin, about 1 metre (3 ft 3 in) in diameter, on a circular base. On the top is a ball and cushion finial, and below it is a paving stone with a cast iron drain cover.	II
Well-head at SE 1485 49 18; 53.93884°N 1.77581°W	—	Late 18th century (probable)	The well-head is in stone and about 2 metres (6 ft 7 in) square. The lower stage has a plinth, a cornice and a blocking course, with the entrance on the north side and the outlet on the east. It is surmounted by a ball and cushion finial. Inside, there is a stone ledge surrounding a square pool.	II
Former stables and coach house 53.93519°N 1.77827°W	—	1776	The stables and coach house were designed by John Carr, and have been converted for residential use. They are in gritstone with hipped grey slate roofs. There are 15 bays, each containing a round-arched recess. The middle five bays have a single storey, sash windows, and a balustrade with vase balusters. These are flanked by two-storey five-bay cross wings projecting to the rear, with two bays on the front, one bay containing a doorway with a fanlight, and the other a sash window. Outside these are three single-storey bays with windows. At the rear is an external flight of cantilevered steps.	II
St Helen's Church; 53.93621°N 1.78083°W		1776	The church, probably designed by John Carr, is in gritstone with a grey slate roof, and consists of a three-bay nave and chancel in one unit, with an integrated west tower, and a later west porch. The lower stage of the tower is square with quatrefoil recesses, and the top stage is octagonal with open pointed arches, and an embattled parapet. On the south side of e church are three windows with pointed arches and a continuous hood mould, and at the east end is a window in Venetian style. The porch is gabled, and on the south side is an entrance with a hood mould and finials, and an eaves cornice.	II*
Bridge over Hundwith Gill; 53.93212°N 1.76813°W	—	c. 1778	The bridge is in stone and consists of a single segmental arch flanked by pilasters with shallow pyramidal caps. The parapet ends in square bollards.	II
1–6 Church Row; 53.93643°N 1.78170°W	—	Late 18th to early 19th century	A terrace of houses in gritstone, with quoins, and stone slate roofs with shaped kneelers and coped gables. In the centre is a projecting gabled block with three storeys and two bays, flanked by wings with two storeys and four bays. On the front are doorways, and the windows are mullioned with some mullions removed.	II
Church Farmhouse; 53.93582°N 1.77972°W	—	Late 18th to early 19th century	The house is in gritstone on a plinth, with quoins, and a stone slate roof with coped gables and shaped kneelers. The central doorway has a corniced hood, and the windows, which date from the 20th century, have flush surrounds and projecting sills.	II
Old School and Schoolhouse; 53.93710°N 1.78326°W	—	Mid 19th century	The school and schoolhouse, later used for other purposes, are in gritstone, with stone gutter brackets, and a blue slate roof with gable copings. There are two storeys, three bays, and a projecting gabled wing on the right. In the angle is a gabled porch, above which is a gabled bellcote. The windows are mullioned with hood moulds, and at the rear are dormers.	II
Gate piers and gates, Denton Hall; 53.93557°N 1.77939°W	—	Mid to late 19th century	The gate piers flanking the entrance to the drive are square, in stone, and about 4 metres (13 ft) high. They have recessed panels, an entablature, a deep cornice, and vase finials. The gates are in wrought iron, with spearhead finials, and scroll and circle motifs.	II
Telephone kiosk 53.93674°N 1.78269°W		1935	The K6 type telephone kiosk was designed by Giles Gilbert Scott. Constructed in cast iron with a square plan and a dome, it has three unperforated crowns in the top panels.	II
