= Henry Fairfax (academic) =

English priest and academic

Henry Fairfax (1588–1665), was an English priest and academic.

== Biography ==
=== Early life ===
He was born in 1588 at Denton, Yorkshire, the fourth son of Thomas Fairfax, 1st Lord Fairfax of Cameron. Two of his brothers were Ferdinando Fairfax and Charles Fairfax. His uncle, Edward Fairfax, who, says Brian Fairfax, was very serviceable to his brother, the first lord Fairfax, in the education of his children, was living at Newall, West Yorkshire about 1600. Henry Fairfax proceeded to Trinity College, Cambridge, of which, in 1608, he became a fellow. In the same year his great friend George Herbert entered the college, where he also obtained a fellowship. They were intimate friends until Herbert's death in 1633.

=== Clerical career ===
He gave up his fellowship on accepting the living of Newton Kyme, Yorkshire, from his father. This preferment he exchanged for a few years for the parish of Ashton-in-Makerfield in Lancashire, returning at the end of that time to Newton Kyme. He married (second wife) Mary, daughter of Sir Henry Cholmley of Whitby, and his rectory at Newton was during the civil wars ‘a refuge and a sanctuary to all their friends and relations on both sides’ (Fairfax MSS.)

Fairfax took an active part in the unsuccessful movement, about 1640, to obtain the foundation of a university for the north. Petitions were sent up to parliament urging the necessity of such a seat of learning. York and Manchester competed warmly for the honour of receiving it. Fairfax wrote to his brother Ferdinando, then second Lord Fairfax, 20 March 1641, asking for his influence. In 1646 Fairfax was removed from Newton Kyme to the neighbouring, and much richer, rectory of Bolton Percy. Here he resided for a great portion of the time with his nephew Thomas, the third Lord Fairfax, as a parishioner at Nun Appleton, until the Restoration in 1660. At that time, his position being doubtful, he voluntarily withdrew in favour of a Mr. Wickham, and retired to a private estate which he had inherited at Oglethorpe, Yorkshire.

Fairfax was an admirable parish priest, and something of an antiquarian and genealogist. His learned brother, Charles, the author of Analecta Fairfaxiana, frequently quotes from his notes on antiquarian and family subjects, and evidently held his learning in the highest respect. None of his works now survive, except some anagrams and epigrams in Analecta Fairfaxiana.

He died at Oglethorpe on 6 April 1665 and was buried in the choir of Bolton Percy Church by the side of Mary, his wife, who had died in 1650. His eldest son Henry succeeded a cousin as fourth Lord Fairfax in 1671. His second son was the diplomat Brian Fairfax.
