= Henry Fairfax (priest) =

English clergyman and academic

Henry Fairfax (1634–1702) was an English clergyman and academic, Dean of Norwich after the Glorious Revolution.

== Life ==
He was a twin son (with John) of Charles Fairfax, and grandson of Thomas Fairfax, 1st Lord Fairfax of Cameron. He was educated at Exeter College, Oxford, where he matriculated 21 July 1653. He graduated B.A. in 1657, M.A. 1659, B.D. 26 April 1660, and D.D. 10 March 1680. He was elected a Fellow of Magdalen College in 1659.

He was senior fellow of Magdalen in 1687, when James II endeavoured to force on the college a president of his own choosing. Fairfax signed the petition to the king (9 April 1687) begging him to cancel his decree ordering the fellows to elect Anthony Farmer. When that appeal failed he voted for a second petition to the same effect (15 April), and on 17 April took a prominent part in electing John Hough to the presidency. With his colleagues he wrote to James Butler, 1st Duke of Ormonde (19 April), asking for his intervention with the king. On 6 June he was summoned before the court of high commission at Whitehall. On 13 June he was brought before George Jeffreys, president of the court, protested against the proceedings, denied their legality, and declined to sign any answer to the charges brought against him. Jeffreys abused him, and told him he was fit for a madhouse.

On 22 June 1687 the high court commissioners suspended Fairfax from his fellowship; but he disputed the validity of the act, and still resided in the college. When the royal commissioners first visited Magdalen on 20 October Fairfax absented himself, although he was in Oxford, whereupon he was pronounced contumacious (31 October) He appeared before the commissioners next day, and denied the right of the king's new nominee, Samuel Parker, to act as president. He would appeal, he said, to the court of king's bench, and with another fellow, Thomas Stafford, signed a protest against the proceedings of the Oxford visitors. On being warned of its dangers he withdrew the document; but he was finally expelled the college and his name struck off the books (25 October). On 11 November his fellowship was filled up. On 22 December he was included in the decree which disqualified all the expelled fellows of Magdalen from holding any ecclesiastical benefice.

After the abdication of James II Fairfax was restored to his fellowship (26 October 1689). A year later (23 October 1689) he was rewarded with the deanery of Norwich, and he died there on 2 May 1702, aged 68, being buried in the cathedral. The tomb is by William Stanton.

He is one of the persons credited with the authorship of An Impartial Relation of the whole proceedings against St. Mary Magdalen Colledge in Oxon.... in 1687 (1688), usually claimed for Charles Aldworth, vice-president of the college.
