= Brian Fairfax =

English politician

Brian Fairfax (1633–1711) was an English politician.

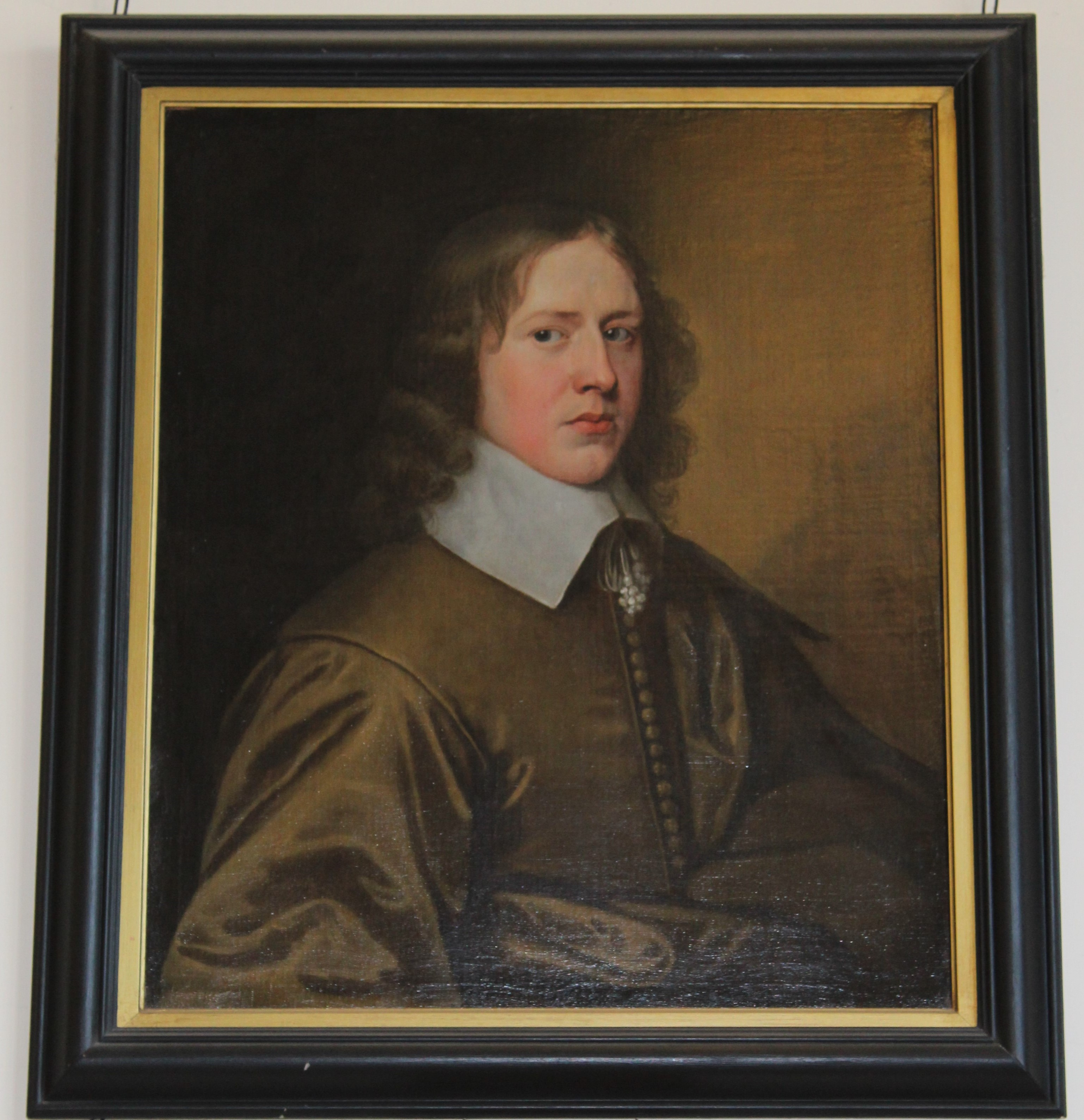
Painting of Brian Fairfax, artist attributed as "the circle of Robert Walker"

== Early life and education ==
Brian Fairfax, the second son of the Rev. Henry Fairfax, was born at the rectory at Newton Kyme, Yorkshire, on 6 October 1633. He gives some account of his early life in a manuscript narrative written for his sons. He was educated for four years at a school at Coxwold in Yorkshire, after which he was sent to Trinity College, Cambridge, graduating B.A. in 1651 and M.A. in 1655.

== Political career ==
In 1658 he went to France with the Earl of Kildare, and on his return was present at the marriage of his second cousin Mary Fairfax to the Duke of Buckingham at Nun Appleton, Yorkshire. When Buckingham was sent to the Tower of London by the Protector, Brian accompanied his cousin Lord Fairfax to Whitehall when he went to demand his son-in-law's release. Brian was constantly with Lord Fairfax during the latter years of his life, and was present at his death. At the end of 1659 Lord Fairfax sent Brian Fairfax on a delicate and dangerous mission to General Monck, who was then in Scotland. In a tract named Iter Boreale, published in the "Fairfax Correspondence", Fairfax describes his journey and his interview with the general. On his return he found Lord Fairfax, 1 January 1660, calling to his standard the gentlemen of Yorkshire, and took an active part in their organisation. On 6 January he was despatched upon a mission from Lord Fairfax to Lenthall, the speaker of the House of Commons, in London, with an explanation of the intention of the movements in the north. Before his return Monck had reached Yorkshire, and Fairfax was present at the interview between Monck and Lord Fairfax at Nun Appleton.

Shortly afterwards, when the parliament sent a commission with Lord Fairfax at its head to the Hague to invite the return of Charles II, Brian Fairfaxaccompanied his cousin in the capacity of private secretary. He was afterwards associated with the Duke of Buckingham in two diplomatic visits to the continent, and also acted as Buckingham's agent until prudence led him to resign. He was appointed equerry to Charles II on 21 January 1670, and held the office until the king's death, when he resigned. He took no part in politics under James II. In 1688 he went over to Holland with his young son Brian to pay his respects to the Princess Mary, who was godchild to his cousin the Duchess of Buckingham. He was received very cordially, and when William III came to the throne Brian was made one of his equerries. At the age of fifty-six he found the duties onerous, and after three years he accepted the post of secretary to a fellow-Yorkshireman, Archbishop Tillotson.

== Later life ==
On the death of the archbishop in 1694 Fairfax retired into private life at York, where he devoted himself to literary work, and to acting as the friend and mentor of the younger generations of his family. He carried on a correspondence with most of the literary men of his day. Some communications of his are among the correspondence of Bishop Francis Atterbury. He wrote a life of the Duke of Buckingham, translated the life of the Huguenot Philip Mornay, seigneur du Plessis, and several poems from his pen are extant, the principal of which is The Vocal Oak, a Lament upon Cutting down the Woods at Nun Appleton. He also edited and published The [Autobiographical] Short Memorials of his cousin, Thomas Fairfax, 3rd Lord Fairfax of Cameron, in 1699.

== Family ==
Brian Fairfax died on 20 September 1711. He had married, on 22 April 1675, in Westminster Abbey, Charlotte, daughter of Sir Edmund Cary. She died 14 November 1709. Three sons, Brian, Ferdinando, and Charles, were educated at Westminster School. Brian Fairfax, the younger, born 11 April 1676, entered as a queen's scholar in 1690; was elected to Trinity College, Cambridge, in 1693; proceeded B.A. 1697, and M.A. 1700; became fellow of Trinity in 1698; and was commissioner of customs from 1723 till his death, 9 January 1749. He collected a valuable library and a gallery of pictures at his house in Panton Square. A catalogue of the library preparatory to a sale by auction was printed in April 1756. But, by a subsequent arrangement, the whole was sold to Mr. Child of Osterley Park, Middlesex. It remained at Osterley till May 1885, when it was sold by Sotheby for the Earl of Jersey. A catalogue of Brian Fairfax's pictures and curiosities was issued in 1759. They were then in the possession of Robert Fairfax, who resided at Leeds Castle, Kent, and became seventh Lord Fairfax on the death of his brother Thomas in 1782. Ferdinando was elected from Westminster to Trinity College, Cambridge, in 1694, and proceeded B.A. in 1697. Charles, elected to Christ Church, Oxford, in 1702, was dean of Down and Connor from 1722 till his death on 27 July 1723. He is described as "a good scholar in the old Irish character".
