= Sir William Constable, 1st Baronet =

English soldier, politician and regicide

Sir William Constable, 1st Baronet (baptised 1590 – 15 June 1655) was an English soldier, politician and regicide, who supported the Parliamentary cause during the English Civil War and interregnum.

== Life ==
Constable was the first son of Sir Robert Constable, who owned estates in Flamborough and Holme in Yorkshire. Little is known about Constable's early life. In 1608, Constable married the daughter of Lord Fairfax and hence received the title baronet from James I in 1611.

After James's death in 1625, Constable found an ally in Sir Thomas Wentworth, the future Earl of Strafford. Through Wentworth's appointment as High Sheriff of Yorkshire, Constable was elected Member of Parliament for Yorkshire in 1626, and then of Scarborough in 1628, serving until 1629. Wentworth appointed him his deputy-lieutenant in 1629.

In 1630 Constable fell into considerable debt, and was forced to sell his estates, with plans to move to New England. This fell through, and Constable and his wife moved to the Netherlands. It was here Constable became involved in the Puritans, led by Philip Nye and Thomas Goodwin. Constable returned to England in 1641 and, with the support of his brother-in-law Lord Ferdinando Fairfax, was elected MP for Knaresborough, Yorkshire. Constable raised an infantry against the Royalist faction in 1642, and fought at Edgehill. In 1643 he commanded under the Fairfaxes at East Riding in Yorkshire. Although he resigned his commission under the Self-denying Ordinance in 1645, he remained an active independent parliamentarian. He did, however, return to the army and took control of John Lambert's foot regiment. In 1648, he sided with Colonel Hammond in guarding the King (Charles I) at Carisbrooke Castle on the Isle of Wight.

From 1648, he sat on the Army Council in the events leading up to the King's treason trial, and sat as a commissioner of the High Court of Justice during the trial itself, and signed the King's death warrant. After the King had been executed at the Banqueting House, Whitehall, he sat on the Council of State and attended many parliamentary committees concerned with military matters. In 1653 he was High Sheriff of Yorkshire.

Constable died in June 1655, during the Commonwealth, received a State funeral and was buried in Westminster Abbey. After the restoration of the Monarchy in 1660, his body was exhumed from the abbey and re-interred in a communal burial pit in St Margaret's Churchyard, Westminster.

Parliament of England
Preceded by Sir Thomas Wentworth; Sir Thomas Fairfax	Member of Parliament for Yorkshire; 1626; With: Sir John Savile	Succeeded by Henry Belasyse; Sir Thomas Wentworth
Preceded by Sir Hugh Cholmeley, Bt; Stephen Hutchinson	Member of Parliament for Scarborough; 1628–1629; With: John Harrison	Parliament suspended until 1640
Preceded by Sir Clipseus Crew; John Rolle	Member of Parliament for Callington; 1628–1629; With: John Rolle	Parliament suspended until 1640
Preceded by Sir Henry Slingsby, 1st Baronet; William Deerlove	Member of Parliament for Knaresborough; 1642–1653; With: Sir Henry Slingsby, 1st Baronet 1642; Thomas Stockdale 1645–1653	Not represented in Barebones Parliament
Baronetage of England
New creation	Baronet (of Flamborough); 1611–1655	Extinct
