= Ferdinando Fairfax, 2nd Lord Fairfax of Cameron =

English politician and army officer (1584–1648)

The Right Honourable The Lord Fairfax of Cameron
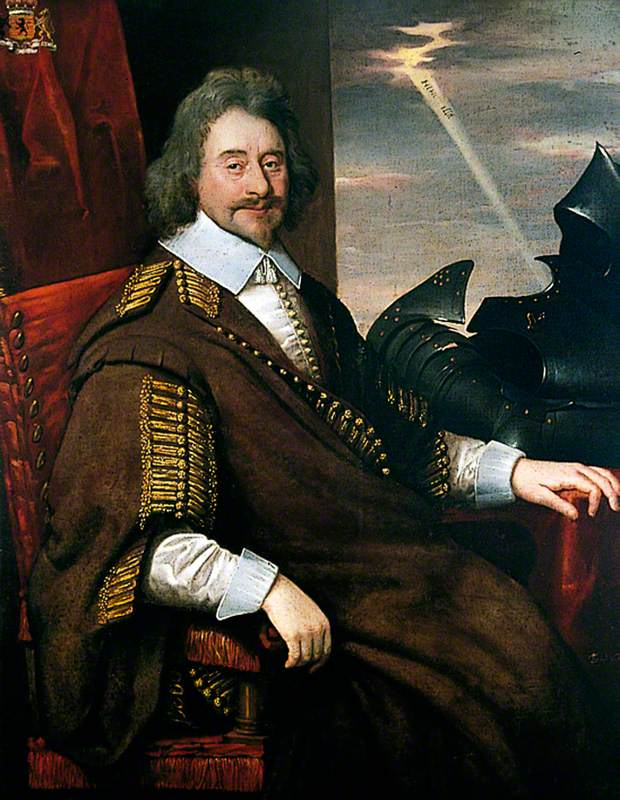
- Born: 29 March 1584; Yorkshire, England
- Died: 14 March 1648 (aged 63); Bolton Percy, Yorkshire
- Spouses: Mary Sheffield; Rhoda Chapman
- Issue: 8, including Thomas
- Parents: Thomas Fairfax, 1st Lord Fairfax of Cameron; Ellen Aske
- Campaign of Fairfax in Yorkshire, 1642–1644 1642 1643 1644

Ferdinando Fairfax, 2nd Lord Fairfax of Cameron (29 March 1584 – 14 March 1648) was an English politician and army officer who sat in the House of Commons at various times between 1614 and 1648. He was a commander in the Parliamentarian army in the English Civil War. His son, Thomas Fairfax, commanded the New Model Army.

== Early life ==
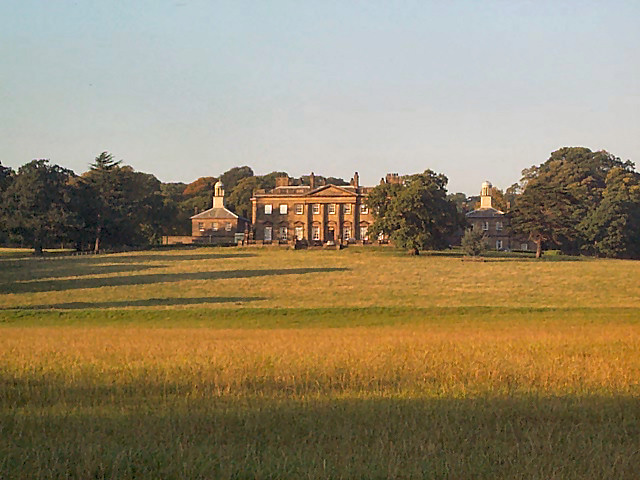
Denton Hall today

He was born in Yorkshire, the eldest son of Ellen Aske and Thomas Fairfax, 1st Lord Fairfax of Cameron, whom Charles I in 1627 created Lord Fairfax of Cameron in the Peerage of Scotland and received a military education in the Netherlands. Two of his brothers were Henry Fairfax and Charles Fairfax. Four others were killed on military service overseas.

== Political career ==
He served as member of the English parliament for Boroughbridge during the six parliaments which met between 1614 and 1629 and also during the Short Parliament of 1640. In May 1640 he succeeded his father as Lord Fairfax, but being a Scottish peer he sat in the English House of Commons as one of the representatives of Yorkshire during the Long Parliament from 1640 until his death. He took the side of the parliament, but held moderate views and desired to maintain the peace. His main seat was Denton Hall in Wharfedale, Yorkshire.

== Military service ==
In the first Bishops' War Fairfax had commanded a regiment in the king's army; then on the outbreak of the English Civil War in 1642 he became commander of the parliamentary forces in Yorkshire, with Newcastle as his opponent. Hostilities began after the repudiation of a treaty of neutrality entered into by Fairfax with the Royalists. At first Fairfax met with no success. He was driven from York, where he was besieging the Royalists, to Selby; then in 1643 to Leeds; and after beating off an attack at that place he was totally defeated on 30 June 1643 at the Battle of Adwalton Moor. He escaped to Hull, which he successfully defended against Newcastle from 2 September until 11 October 1643, and by means of a sally caused the siege to be raised. Fairfax was victorious at Selby on 11 April 1644, and joining the Scots, besieged York, after which he was present at the Battle of Marston Moor (2 July 1644), where he commanded the infantry and was routed. He was subsequently, in July 1644, made Governor of York and charged with the further reduction of the county. In December 1644 he took the town of Pontefract, but failed to secure the castle.

During his command in Yorkshire, Fairfax engaged in a paper war with Newcastle, and wrote "The Answer of Ferdinando, Lord Fairfax, to a Declaration of William, Earl of Newcastle" (1642; printed in Rushworth, pt. iii. vol. ii. p. 139); he also published "A Letter from . . . Lord Fairfax to . . . Robert, Earl of Essex" (1643), describing the victorious sally at Hull.

== Later life ==
Fairfax resigned his command on the passing of the Self-denying Ordinance, but remained a member of the Committee for the Government of Yorkshire and was appointed, on 24 July 1645, steward of the manor of Pontefract. He died from an accident which caused gangrene in his foot on 14 March 1648 and was buried at All Saints' Church, Bolton Percy, in Yorkshire.

== Marriages and issue ==
Fairfax married twice. By his first wife, Mary Sheffield, daughter of Edmund Sheffield, 3rd Baron of Sheffield (afterwards 1st Earl of Mulgrave), he had six daughters and two sons: Thomas Fairfax, who succeeded him as the third Lord Fairfax, and Charles, a colonel of horse, who was killed at Marston Moor.

He married his second wife, Rhoda Chapman, widow of Thomas Hussey, in October 1646: Their only child, Ursula, married William Cartwright.

Parliament of England
Preceded by Sir Thomas Vavasour; Sir Henry Jenkins	Member of Parliament for Boroughbridge; 1614–1629; With: George Marshall 1614; George Wethered 1621; Christopher Mainwaring 1624; William Mainwaring 1625; Philip Mainwaring 1626; Francis Neville 1628–1629	Parliament suspended until 1640
Vacant =Parliament suspended since 1640	Member of Parliament for Boroughbridge; 1640; With: Francis Neville	Succeeded by Sir Philip Stapylton; Thomas Mauleverer
Preceded by Sir William Savile, 3rd Baronet; Henry Belasyse	Member of Parliament for Yorkshire; 1640–1648; With: Henry Belasyse	Not represented in Rump Parliament
Peerage of Scotland
Preceded by Thomas Fairfax	Lord Fairfax of Cameron; 1640–1648	Succeeded by Thomas Fairfax
