= John Savile, 1st Baron Savile of Pontefract =

English politician

John Savile, 1st Baron Savile of Pontefract (1556 – 31 August 1630) was an English politician. He was M.P. for Lincoln (1586), Sheriff of Lincolnshire (1590), knight of the shire for Yorkshire (1597, 1614, 1624 and 1626), custos rotulorum of West Riding of Yorkshire (ejected from office in 1615 but reappointed in 1626), privy councillor and comptroller of household (1627–1630). He was created Baron Savile in 1627.

== Early life ==
John Savile was born in 1556, the son of Sir Robert Savile of Barkston, Lincolnshire (d. 1585), by his wife Anne Hussey (d. 1562), sister of John Hussey, 1st Baron Hussey of Sleaford, and widow of Sir Richard Thimelby. His father was the illegitimate son of Sir Henry Savile of Thornhill in the West Riding of Yorkshire and had served as sheriff of Lincolnshire in 1573.

== Political career ==
He entered parliament as member for Lincoln in 1586, and he served as sheriff of that county in 1590. On 3 October 1597 he was elected knight of the shire for the county of York, for which he was again returned in 1614. In the latter Parliament he distinguished himself by his opposition to the king, and was consequently struck off the commission of the peace at the close of the session. He was also custos rotulorum for the West Riding of Yorkshire, but is said to have made "use of his authority to satisfy his own ends". In 1615 he was removed from the office and Thomas Wentworth (afterwards Earl of Strafford) appointed in his place. There had long been bitter rivalry between the Saviles and the Wentworths, and they soon "imported their county quarrels into public affairs". According to Clarendon, Wentworth's "first inclinations and addresses to the court were only to establish his greatness in the country where he apprehended some acts of power from the old Lord Savile, who had been his rival always there, and of late had strengthened himself by being made a privy councillor and an [ 373 ] officer at court"; and he "rested not until he had bereaved him of all power and place in court, and so sent him down a most abject, disconsolate old man to his country".

Upon his ejection from the office of custos rotulorum, Savile began intriguing with the Duke of Buckingham, whom in September 1617 he induced to write to Wentworth demanding his resignation of the office. Wentworth, however, remonstrated, and, being powerfully supported in the county, carried his point. Buckingham acknowledged that he had been misled by Savile. On 19 January 1624 Savile was again elected for Yorkshire, his colleague being his son Thomas; but in 1625 Wentworth and Lord Fairfax carried the election against him. This was the occasion of the famous dispute in parliament which first brought Wentworth and Eliot into collision. Savile accused the sheriff of having interrupted the polling when it was going against Wentworth, who was his friend. After a heated debate, in which Wentworth broke the rules of the house, and Eliot denounced him as Catiline, the election was declared void. At the by-election Wentworth was again elected; but on 16 Jananuary 1625–6, in a new parliament, Savile once more carried the seat, Wentworth having been made sheriff to prevent his contesting it.

Savile was now high in Buckingham's favour; in July 1626 he was again appointed custos rotulorum in Wentworth's place. Soon afterwards he was sworn of the Privy Council for his services in parliament, and in December was placed on a commission to inquire into abuses in the navy. In the following April his exertions secured the success of the forced loan in Yorkshire, and soon after, through Buckingham's influence, he succeeded Sir John Suckling as comptroller of the household. In May he was placed on a commission to inquire into offices existing and fees taken in Elizabeth's reign. In July he was appointed receiver of the revenues from recusants in the north, and a year later he was created Baron Savile of Pontefract, on the same day (21 July) that Wentworth was raised to the peerage. He held the office of comptroller till his death, aged 74, on 31 August 1630, so that Clarendon's reference to him as an "abject, disconsolate old man" is exaggerated. He was buried in Batley church, Yorkshire, where a monument, with an inflated inscription (printed by Whitaker), was raised to his memory by his daughter, Anne Leigh.

== Domestic life ==
About 1590 Savile built Howley Hall in Batley, which he made his seat; Camden described it as "ædes elegantissimas", and its ruins were still extant in 1900. Tradition says that Rubens visited him there, and painted for him a view of Pontefract. Savile married, first, Catherine, daughter of Charles, lord Willoughby of Parham, by whom he had no issue; secondly, on 20 November 1586, Elizabeth, daughter of Sir Edward Cary, and sister of Sir Henry Cary, 1st Viscount Falkland. By her he had five sons and three daughters; he was succeeded by his eldest surviving son, Thomas Savile, Earl of Sussex.

== Notes ==
Parliament of England
Preceded by Stephen Thymbleby; John Joye	Member of Parliament for Lincoln; 1586–1587; With: Thomas Fairfax	Succeeded by George Anton; Peter Eure
Preceded by Sir George Savile, Bt; John Aske	Member of Parliament for Yorkshire; 1597–1598; With: Sir William Fairfax	Succeeded by Sir Edward Stanhope; Thomas Fairfax
Preceded by Sir Edward Stanhope; Thomas Fairfax	Member of Parliament for Yorkshire; 1604–1614; With: Sir Francis Clifford 1604; Sir Richard Gargrave 1606; Sir Thomas Wentworth 1614	Succeeded by Sir Thomas Wentworth; Lord George Calvert
Preceded by Sir Thomas Wentworth; Lord George Calvert	Member of Parliament for Yorkshire; 1624–1625; With: Sir Thomas Savile	Succeeded by Sir Thomas Wentworth; Thomas Fairfax
Preceded by Sir Thomas Wentworth; Thomas Fairfax	Member of Parliament for Yorkshire; 1626; With: Sir William Constable, Bt	Succeeded by Sir Thomas Wentworth; Henry Belasyse
Peerage of England
New creation	Baron Savile of Pontefract; 1627–1630	Succeeded by Thomas Savile
