= Denton, North Yorkshire =

Hamlet and civil parish in North Yorkshire, England

Coordinates: 53.936560°N 1.782830°W

Denton
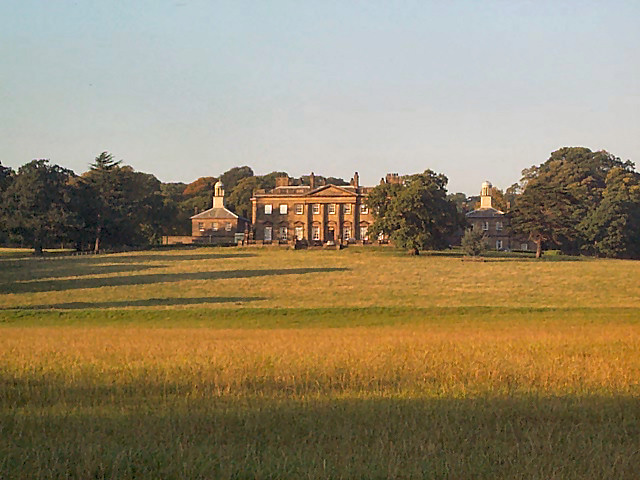
- Denton Hall, once home of the Fairfax family

- Location within North Yorkshire
- OS grid reference: SE143489
- Civil parish: Denton
- Unitary authority: North Yorkshire
- Ceremonial county: North Yorkshire
- Region: Yorkshire and the Humber
- Country: England
- Sovereign state: United Kingdom
- Post town: ILKLEY
- Postcode district: LS29
- Police: North Yorkshire
- Fire: North Yorkshire
- Ambulance: Yorkshire

Denton is a hamlet and civil parish in the county of North Yorkshire, England. At the 2011 Census the population of this civil parish was less than 100. Details are included in the civil parish of Middleton, Harrogate. It is situated 1 mile (1.6 km) north-east of Ilkley, West Yorkshire.

Until 1974 it was part of the West Riding of Yorkshire. From 1974 to 2023 it was part of the Borough of Harrogate, it is now administered by the unitary North Yorkshire Council.

Denton Hall is located in the hamlet. The church in the village is noted for some its windows which instead of stained glass, are panels where the artists have painted directly onto the glass.

The name Denton comes from Old English and means farmstead or village in a valley.

== Notable people ==
The area around Denton is notable as being the birthplace of several members of the Fairfax family;

- Thomas Fairfax, 1st Lord Fairfax of Cameron (1560–1640), built the estate up at Denton
- Ferdinando Fairfax, 2nd Lord Fairfax of Cameron (1584–1648)
- Thomas Fairfax (1612–1671)

== See also ==
- Listed buildings in Denton, North Yorkshire
