= Denton Hall, Wharfedale =

Country house in North Yorkshire, England

Coordinates: 53.9340°N 1.7765°W

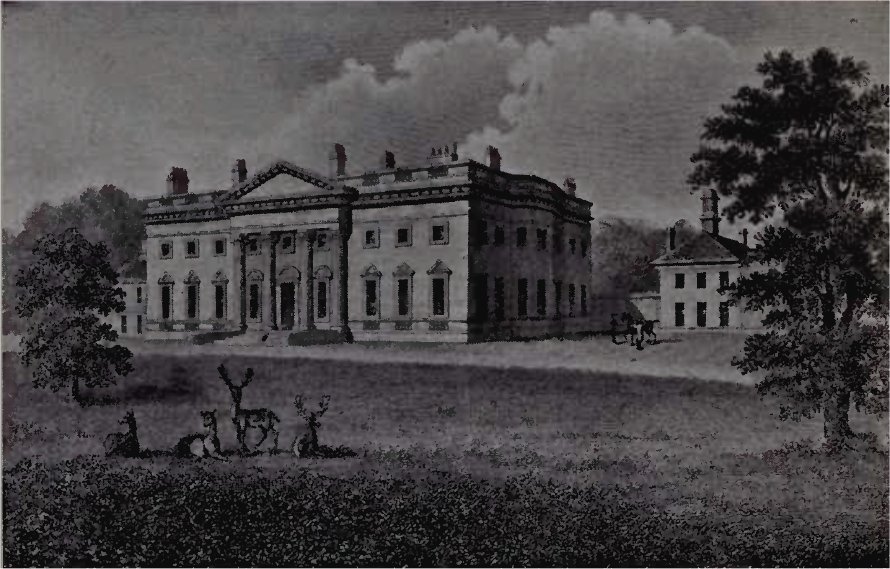
Denton Hall, c. 1800

Denton Hall is an English country house located to the north of the River Wharfe, at Denton, North Yorkshire, England between Otley and Ilkley, and set within a larger Denton estate of about 2,500 acres (1,000 ha), including a village, church, and landscaped gardens. It is a Grade I listed building.

== History ==
The written history of Denton goes back to at least 1253, when the then-owner, one Athelstan (not to be confused with the king of that name), made the estate over to the See of York, which already owned manorial rights in nearby Otley.

It was subinfeuded (sub-let) at an early date to the Vavasours, and in 1284 Maugerus le Vavasur held the town for a fourth part of a knight's fee of the Archbishops of York, who continued lords paramount. In 1379, according to the poll-tax returns, one Adam Wayte appears to have been then farming the manor, at which time Denton had a more than ordinary reputation for clothes-making and drapery goods. The estate passed into the ownership of the Thwaites family when Elizabeth, daughter of Henry Thwaites, married John Vavasour of Weston, who died in 1482; records show the Thwaites family had been resident in Denton village earlier than that time. Again through marriage, in 1515 the estate passed to the Fairfax family. At the time of Thomas Fairfax, 1st Lord Fairfax of Cameron, Denton Hall had repute as housing one of the best libraries in Yorkshire (some of which later made up a part of the Thoresby Museum; others, including the Dodsworth manuscripts made their way to the Bodleian Library at Oxford). Denton was the birthplace and seat of Thomas Fairfax, 3rd Lord Fairfax of Cameron, famous as a general and commander-in-chief during the English Civil War.

The estate was eventually sold by Lady Fairfax, widow of the 5th Lord Fairfax, in 1717 to James Ibbetson, a member of an old Yorkshire clan which had grown rich from a Leeds merchant house devoted to cloth. It is said that the sale was to pay off debts on her estates in Kent, but that the sale was made so recklessly that the price given for Denton was covered by the value of the timber on the estate. On the Ibbetsons coming into possession of Denton in 1717 they did much to improve the estate. Sir Henry Carr Ibbetson, Bart, as the first President of the Wharfedale Agricultural Society, specialised in the breeding of Shorthorn cattle. Later Ibbetsons were responsible for the erection of the second and third Denton Halls.

By the marriage in 1845 of Laura, daughter of Sir Charles Ibbetson, Bart., with Marmaduke Wyvill, M.P., for Richmond, the Denton estate passed to the Wyvills in 1861. About 1902 the house was let, the furnishings being removed to the Wyvill's ancestral seat, Constable Burton, North Yorkshire. It was again sold, to Albert Holden Illingworth, 1st Baron Illingworth in 1920, and then by him in 1925 to Arthur Hill, who made a number of alterations to the hall still evident today. It was most recently bought by the firm of NG Bailey in 1976, who have refurbished it, use it as offices and let out rooms for meetings and conferences.

In July 2023, North Yorkshire Council approved plans for the hall to converted into use as a hotel.

== Architecture ==
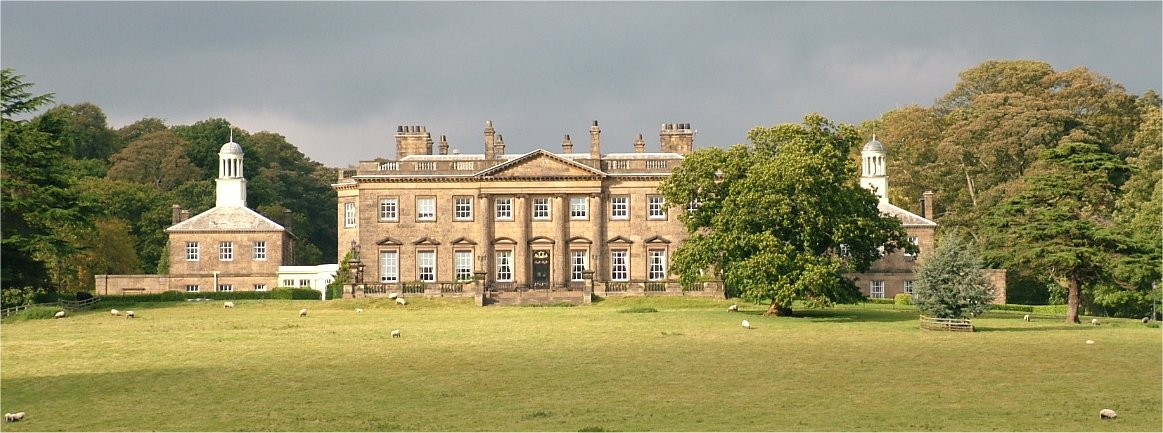
Denton Hall, September 2007

The current hall dates to the 1770s, with a cited completion date of 1778. It was designed and the construction overseen by John Carr, for Sir James Ibbetson, 2nd Bart. Twice before the hall had been burnt down through the (alleged) carelessness of servants, in 1734 and once rebuilt, again in 1743. This circumstance induced the builder of the present mansion to compose a Latin verse, which he had affixed in front of the building. It may be rendered as follows:

NOR WRATH OF JOVE, NOR FIRE, NOR SWORD, I FERVENT PRAY,
MAY THIS FAIR DOME AGAIN IN PROSTRATE RUINS LAY.

Among the furniture supplied for Denton, the largest amount (£551) was delivered by Thomas Chippendale, born in the parish. The other major supplier was the firm of Gillow of Lancaster; a small sum was spent with Ince and Mayhew.

== Film location ==
Denton Hall has been used as a college for old people, and also was a location for two films: In the 1942 The Life and Death of Colonel Blimp by Powell & Pressburger, it is the seat of the Wynne family, whose daughter Barbara marries the eponymous Colonel. It is also a setting for the non-animated elements of the 1978 film The Water Babies as Harthover Hall.

== See also ==
- Grade I listed buildings in North Yorkshire (district)
- Listed buildings in Denton, North Yorkshire
