= Thomas Fairfax, 1st Lord Fairfax of Cameron =

English army officer, diplomat and politician (1560–1640)

The Right Honourable The Lord Fairfax of Cameron
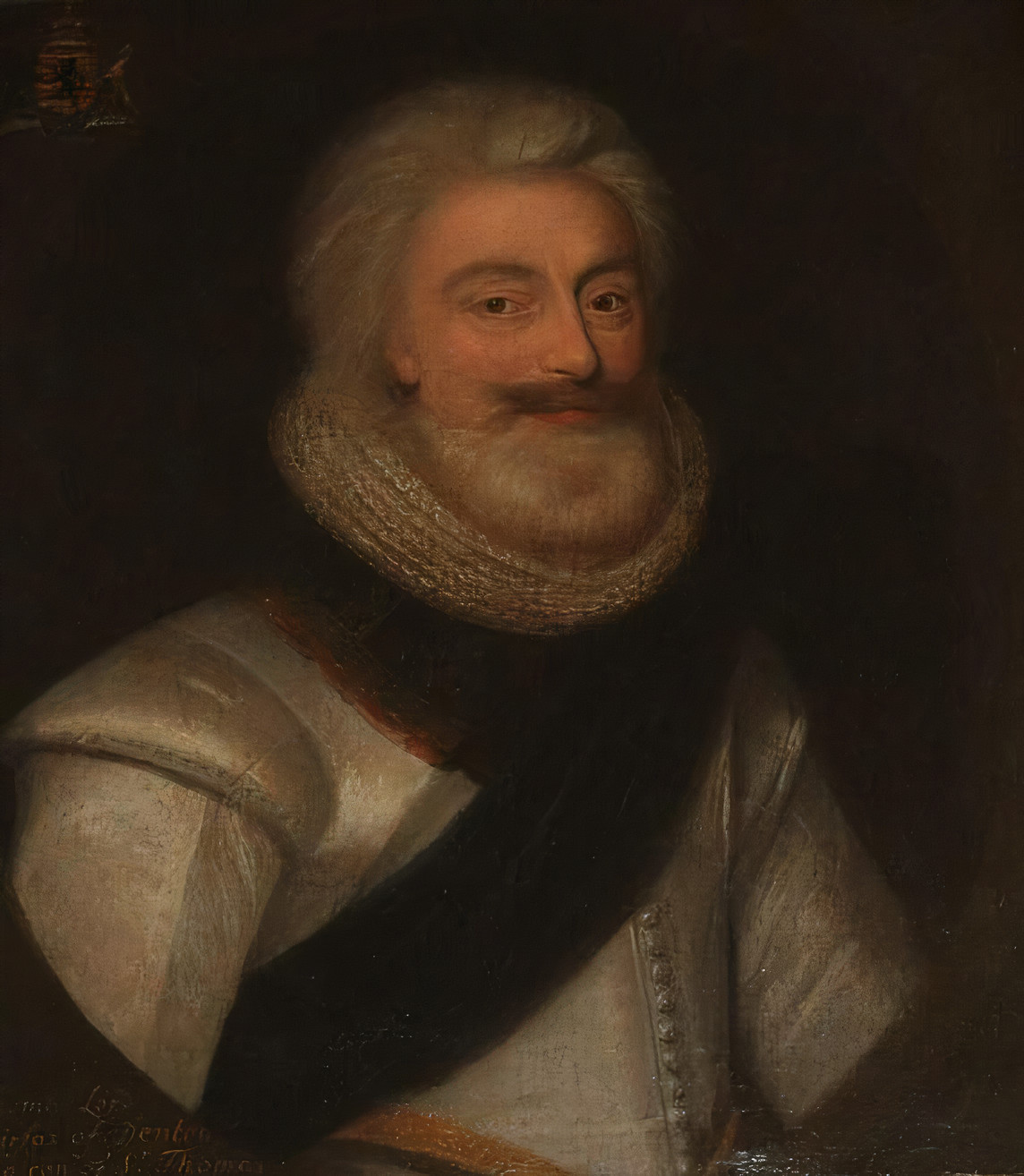
- Born: c. 1560; Bilbrough, Yorkshire
- Died: 2 May 1640; England
- Spouse: Ellen Aske
- Issue: 7, including Ferdinando, Henry and Charles
- Parents: Sir Thomas Fairfax; Dorothy Gale

Thomas Fairfax, 1st Lord Fairfax of Cameron (c. 1560 – 1 May 1640) was an English army officer, diplomat and politician.

== Life ==
Thomas Fairfax was the eldest son of Sir Thomas Fairfax of Denton, Yorkshire and Dorothy Gale, and was born at Bilbrough, Yorkshire. As a young man he saw military service in the Low Countries, where he commanded a company of foot under Sir Francis Vere. Before and after the death of Mary, Queen of Scots, he was employed by Elizabeth on several diplomatic communications with James VI of Scotland. James offered him a title, which he declined. In 1586 he offered his services to James to suppress a rebellion under Lord Maxwell; and on the death of Elizabeth he was, with six of his nearest kindred, one of the first Englishmen who went to Scotland to swear fealty to the new king. He had served in France under Robert Devereux, Earl of Essex and was knighted by him in Rouen in 1591. He also sat as a member of parliament for Lincoln in 1586, for Aldborough in 1588 and for Yorkshire in 1601 and 1625.

After the accession of James I to the throne, he settled down on his estate at Denton Hall near Ilkley. He bred horses, and wrote about horsemanship. On the accession of Charles I, Fairfax was again knight of the shire (MP) for Yorkshire in the parliament of 1625. He drew up a statement of his services, and on 4 May 1627 was created Lord Fairfax of Cameron in the Peerage of Scotland; the grant was facilitated by a payment of £1,500.

Fairfax died 1 May 1640. He was buried, by the side of his wife, who had died in 1620, in the south transept of All Saints' Church, Otley, where a large altar-tomb, surmounted with their effigies, still commemorates their virtues. The legend was written by Edward Fairfax the poet, his half-brother.

== Works ==
Fairfax is said in Analecta Fairfaxiana to have written a number of works: a discourse, containing 150 pages, entitled 'Dangers Diverted, or the Highway to Heidelbergh'; 'Conjectures about Horsemanship'; 'The Malitia of Yorkshire'; a tract on the Yorkshire cavalry and against horse racing; 'The Malitia of Durham'; 'Orders for the House,' &c. The last of his works, The Order for the Government of the House of Denton, lays down in great detail the duties of every servant in his household.

== Family ==
In 1582 he married Ellen, daughter of Robert Aske of Aughton, Yorkshire. As a member of the Council of the North he was brought into connection with Edmund Sheffield, Earl of Mulgrave, its president. His eldest son Ferdinando Fairfax, 2nd Lord Fairfax of Cameron, married Sheffield's daughter, Mary, in 1607. In 1620 Fairfax's younger sons, William and John, were with the English army in the Low Countries. A letter from William states that his 'white-haired father' had come over to join them, bought horses and arms, and been received with the respect due to his former services. In 1631 he heard from their general that both his sons had been killed at the siege of Frankenthal. Two other sons are stated by Thoresby to have died a violent death in the same year: Peregrine at La Rochelle and Thomas in Turkey. Henry Fairfax (fourth son) and Charles Fairfax were other sons.

Fairfax had two daughters: Dorothy, married to Sir William Constable, and Anne, wife of Sir George Wentworth of Woolley.

== See also ==
- Nun Appleton Priory

Peerage of Scotland
New creation	Lord Fairfax of Cameron; 1627–1640	Succeeded by Ferdinando Fairfax
