= Henry Bromflete =

English baron

Sir Henry Bromflete (died 1469) was an English landowner, courtier, soldier, administrator and diplomat from Yorkshire who married the Duke of York's widow and was created Baron Vessy but left no son to continue the title.

== Origins ==
Born before 1389, he was the only surviving son and heir of Sir Thomas Bromflete (died 31 December 1430), who served three times as High Sheriff of Yorkshire, and his wife Margaret St John (died 22 October 1407). She was the only daughter and heiress of Sir Edward St John (died 7 March 1389), of Londesborough, and his wife Anastasia Aton, daughter and co-heiress of Sir William Aton.

== Career ==
In 1412 he was appointed to the Royal Household of King Henry IV as an Esquire of the King's Chamber with an income for life of 33 pounds (equivalent to about 28,000 pounds in 2022). When the next King Henry V launched an expedition against France in 1415, he joined as a gentleman leading 12 pikemen and 36 archers under the command of Sir Hartung von Klux. By April 1416 he had married the widow of the first Duke of York, the young king's great-uncle. Knighted before 1419, he served on the king's staff in France until after June 1421. In 1422-23 he became embroiled in a domestic dispute with his wife Joan. Broomflet had spent four years serving overseas on Henry V’s campaign in Northern France and told his servants to take order from his wife while he was away, presuming she would continue to reside at her manor of Cottingham in East Yorkshire during his absence. Instead, Joan decided to leave the manor and took more than a thousand pounds worth of the couples silver plate. Broomflet, allegedly furious at his wife for putting such valuable possessions at risk by moving them responded by bringing charges of theft against his household for moving the silver without his possession. William Paston; patriarch of the Paston family represented Joan in the proceedings which she subsequently lost against her husband. Back in England he participated in local government, sitting on county commissions, and also had a first diplomatic appointment for negotiations with Scotland in 1430.

On the last day of that year his father died and he inherited not only his lands but also his mother's share in the Aton lands, which included those descended from the last Baron Vescy (killed over 100 years earlier at the battle of Bannockburn in 1314). In February 1432 he was one of two ambassadors negotiating with France and in November started a year's term as Sheriff of Yorkshire and Constable of York Castle. When that ended, he volunteered to be one of England's ambassadors to the General Council of the Catholic Church at Basel, now in Switzerland. In 1437 he was again on diplomatic duty in France as a member of the king's Council there, for King Henry VI of England had been crowned as King of France in 1431, and negotiated to end the war. From 1437 he also attended some meetings of the Privy Council of England, but was never sworn as a member.

In 1449 he received a writ to attend the Parliament of England as Baron Vessy, and continued to be summoned until 1467, though in 1456 he obtained permission to be absent unless he wished and in 1462 was excused for life. At a local level he sought to develop his scattered estates, for example in 1458 he obtained permission for a weekly market and two annual trade fairs at Market Weighton and the right to fish freely in parts of the River Humber. During the first phase of the Wars of the Roses, he supported the ruling Lancastrian side and in July 1460 was one of the barons involved in the siege of the Tower of London, but with the victory of King Edward IV he rallied to the Yorkist side. He died on 16 January 1469 and was buried at the church of the Whitefriars in London.

== Family ==
Between 29 September 1415 and 27 April 1416, he married Joan Holland, Duchess of York. Born about 1380 as the third daughter of Thomas Holland, 2nd Earl of Kent (died 25 April 1397), and his wife Alice FitzAlan (died 17 March 1416), she was the widow of three previous husbands: Edmund of Langley, 1st Duke of York, who died on 1 August 1402; William Willoughby, 5th Baron Willoughby de Eresby, who died on 4 December 1409; and Henry Scrope, 3rd Baron Scrope of Masham, executed for treason on 5 August 1415. She died on 12 April 1434.

His second wife was Eleanor FitzHugh, daughter of Henry FitzHugh, 3rd Baron FitzHugh, (died 11 January 1425) and his wife Elizabeth Grey (died 12 December 1427). She was the widow of two previous husbands: Philip Darcy, 6th Baron Darcy of Knaith, who died on 2 August 1418; and Sir Thomas Tunstall, of Tunstall, Lancashire, who died after May 1431. She died on 30 September 1457 at Stoke Newington in Middlesex, leaving a daughter:

Margaret Bromflete, born about 1434, who married first in 1454 John Clifford, 9th Baron Clifford (died 28 March 1461), and secondly, by 1467, Sir Lancelot Threlkeld, of Threlkeld.
