= Richard Tempest =

English gentry in West Yorkshire, died 1537

Sir Richard Tempest (about 1480 – 25 August 1537) was an English landowner, courtier, soldier, administrator and legislator under Kings Henry VII and Henry VIII who was imprisoned after joining the Pilgrimage of Grace and died in jail.

== Origins and early life ==
Tempest was from a long established Yorkshire family who had been landowners in Yorkshire since the time of King Henry I, with their estates centred on the village of Bracewell (now in Lancashire). Richard's father, Nicholas Tempest (about 1450 – 1483), was a younger son of Sir John Tempest of Bracewell (about 1420 – 1464) and his wife Alice, daughter of Sir Robert Sherburne of Stonyhurst. His mother was Margaret Pilkington, daughter of Sir Robert Pilkington of Pilkington and his wife Joan Rawson.

His father having died when he was only about three years old, he was brought up by his uncle Sir Thomas Tempest who married him to an heiress Rosamund Bolling, daughter of Tristram Bolling and Beatrix Calverley when he was about 17 years old. Her father died 31 May 1502, leaving the couple his lands, and his uncle died in 1507, leaving Richard the family estate of Bracewell.

== Career ==
In local administration, by 1505 he obtained a post under the Duchy of Lancaster as steward of Bradford, adding the stewardship of Blackburn in 1511, of Rochdale in 1527, of Wakefield by 1530, and of Barnoldswick by 1537. In 1523 he was receiver for the Lancashire lands of Edward Stanley, 3rd Earl of Derby. By 1526 he was master forester of the Forest of Bowland, in 1527 keeper of Quernmore Park and by 1530 constable of Sandal Castle. From 1511 he was a justice of the peace for the West Riding of Yorkshire, being appointed to the bench for the East Riding in 1530 and the North Riding in 1536. As a JP he was on the commission of array for the West Riding in 1511, the commission for the subsidy tax for the whole of Yorkshire in 1512 and various other commissions over the years. In 1516 he served as high sheriff of Yorkshire.

In royal service, he was an esquire of the body to King Henry VII and as such was in attendance at his funeral in Westminster Abbey in 1509. At the celebrations in 1511 for the birth of Henry, Duke of Cornwall, he took part in the jousting. When war broke out with France in 1513, he followed King Henry VIII there and was knighted at the Siege of Tournai. In 1520 at the meeting between King Henry and King Francis I of France on the Field of the Cloth of Gold, he was one of three knights in charge of security and was also at Gravelines during the meeting between King Henry and the Holy Roman Emperor Charles V.

In national politics, he was elected a member of the Parliament of England for Appleby in 1529, but records do not show how long he held the seat.

Despite the influential positions he held in the North of England, at Westminster and at the King's court, his behaviour was not at all exemplary. Allegations of corruption and of violent behaviour, including killings, mounted. One particular long-running feud with Sir Henry Savile of Thornhill led to a request that both be removed from the magistracy. His downfall came with the rising of 1536, when in October he joined the rebels at Pontefract and was then named as a captain in their forces assembled at York. After his younger brother Nicholas was executed at Tyburn in May 1537, he was sent to the Fleet Prison in London and died there. His will made on 6 January 1536 was proved on 29 January 1538, his heir being his eldest son Thomas.

== Family ==
By a settlement dated 13 July 1497, he was married to Rosamund, daughter and sole heiress of Tristram Bowling of Bowling and his wife Beatrice, daughter of Walter Calverley and his wife Elizabeth Markenfield. She outlived him, dying on 1 Feb 1554. Their children who married were:

- Sir Thomas, a sheriff of Yorkshire, married Margaret, daughter of his great-uncle Sir Thomas Tempest (died 1507) and his wife Elizabeth, daughter of William Bosvile of Chevet, and died in 1545 without children.
- Sir John, heir to his elder brother and also a sheriff of Yorkshire, married Anne, widow of Sir Thomas Tempest and of George Smith and daughter of William Lenthall, and died in 1565 without children.
- Nicholas, who inherited Bracewell after the deaths of his two elder brothers, married first Isabel, daughter of Henry Keighley of Inskip and secondly Beatrice, daughter of John Bradford of Heath, and had two sons Richard and Robert.
- Tristram, married Alice, daughter of Alexander Methley.
- Henry, married Helen, daughter of Christopher Mirfield of Tong and inherited that estate.
- Elizabeth, in about 1533 married Sir Peter Frescheville of Staveley, sheriff of Derbyshire. Their grandson was Peter Frescheville MP.
- Jane, married before 1526 Sir Thomas Waterton of Walton and Sandal, MP and sheriff of Yorkshire. Their son was Thomas Waterton, MP.
- Anne, married John Lacy of Cromwell Bottom at Brighouse.
- Beatrice, married William Gascoigne of Gawthorpe.
- Christopher d.s.p.
- George d.s.p.
- Robert d.s.p.
