= Thomas Gower =

Thomas Gower may refer to:

- Sir Thomas Gower (marshal of Berwick) (fl. 1543 - 1577), English soldier
- Sir Thomas Gower, 1st Baronet (1584 – c. 1665), High Sheriff of Yorkshire in 1620
- Sir Thomas Gower, 2nd Baronet (died 1672), Royalist and twice High Sheriff of Yorkshire
