= John Neville II =

English landowner, courtier, soldier, administrator and politician

Sir John Neville (died 1541), of Chevet in Yorkshire, was an English landowner, courtier, soldier, administrator and politician who was executed for treason under King Henry VIII.

== Origins ==
Born by 1488, he was the third son of Sir John Neville (died 22 October 1502), of Liversedge in Yorkshire, and his wife Maud (died 1505), daughter of Sir William Ryther (died 1475), of Ryther in Yorkshire, and his first wife Isabel Gascoigne. His family, a junior branch of the powerful Nevilles, had lived at Liversedge since his ancestor Sir Edmund Neville (born about 1295) had married the heiress.

== Career ==
Early on he entered royal service, attending the funeral of King Henry VII in 1509 as a Yeoman of the Horse, and in that year he married a Yorkshire heiress. As a member of the Royal Household, he acquired various royal appointments throughout his life, mostly in or near his native Yorkshire.

In 1513 he served in the English army fighting the French at the siege of Tournai and was knighted there. His cavalry skills ensured that in 1520 he was one of the English knights who jousted against the French team at the Field of the Cloth of Gold and against the Imperial team at Gravelines. In 1523 he served in the English raids on Scotland which followed from the Treaty of Windsor with the Holy Roman Empire.

Three times chosen as High Sheriff of Yorkshire, for 1518–19, 1523–24 and 1527–28, he may have been Member of Parliament (MP) for Yorkshire before 1529. In the Parliament of 1529 he filled the vacancy left when John Neville, 3rd Baron Latimer, moved to the House of Lords and probably retained the seat in 1536.

In 1532 he was made a justice of the peace in Yorkshire and by 1533 was a Knight of the Body to the King. When the revolt known as the Pilgrimage of Grace broke out in Yorkshire in 1536, he was active in suppressing it. In 1540 he was made a Gentleman Pensioner but the next year was arrested and charged with treason for failing to report a conspiracy against the Crown. Initially held in the Tower of London, from there he was taken to York and on 15 June 1541 executed. As his widow and eldest son were pardoned, the family were able to keep their lands and goods.

== Family ==
By August 1509, he had married Elizabeth, the widow of Sir Thomas Tempest (died 1507) of Bracewell then in Yorkshire, and the daughter and coheiress of William Bosvile, of Chevet. Elizabeth, Lady Neville, came to the Field of the Cloth of Gold in 1520. Children of theirs who married were:

Henry, heir of Chevet, married Dorothy, daughter of Sir John Dawnay.
Francis, married Elizabeth, daughter and coheiress of Thomas Pigott.
Elizabeth, married first Roger Rokeley, of Falthwaite, secondly James Franks and thirdly Roland Jackson, of Harleston.
Anne, married first Thomas Drakes, of Westhall, and secondly Thomas Gregson.
Mary (died 1564), married the MP Sir Gervase Clifton (died 1588), of Clifton. An account of their wedding expenses in 1530 includes details of her gown and the banquet. She was the grandmother of Sir Gervase Clifton, 1st Baronet. Her daughter Elizabeth married Sir Peter Frescheville, of Staveley, High Sheriff of Derbyshire in 1572.
