= Slingsby Castle =

Ruined building in Slingsby, North Yorkshire, England

Coordinates: 54.1651°N 0.9354°W

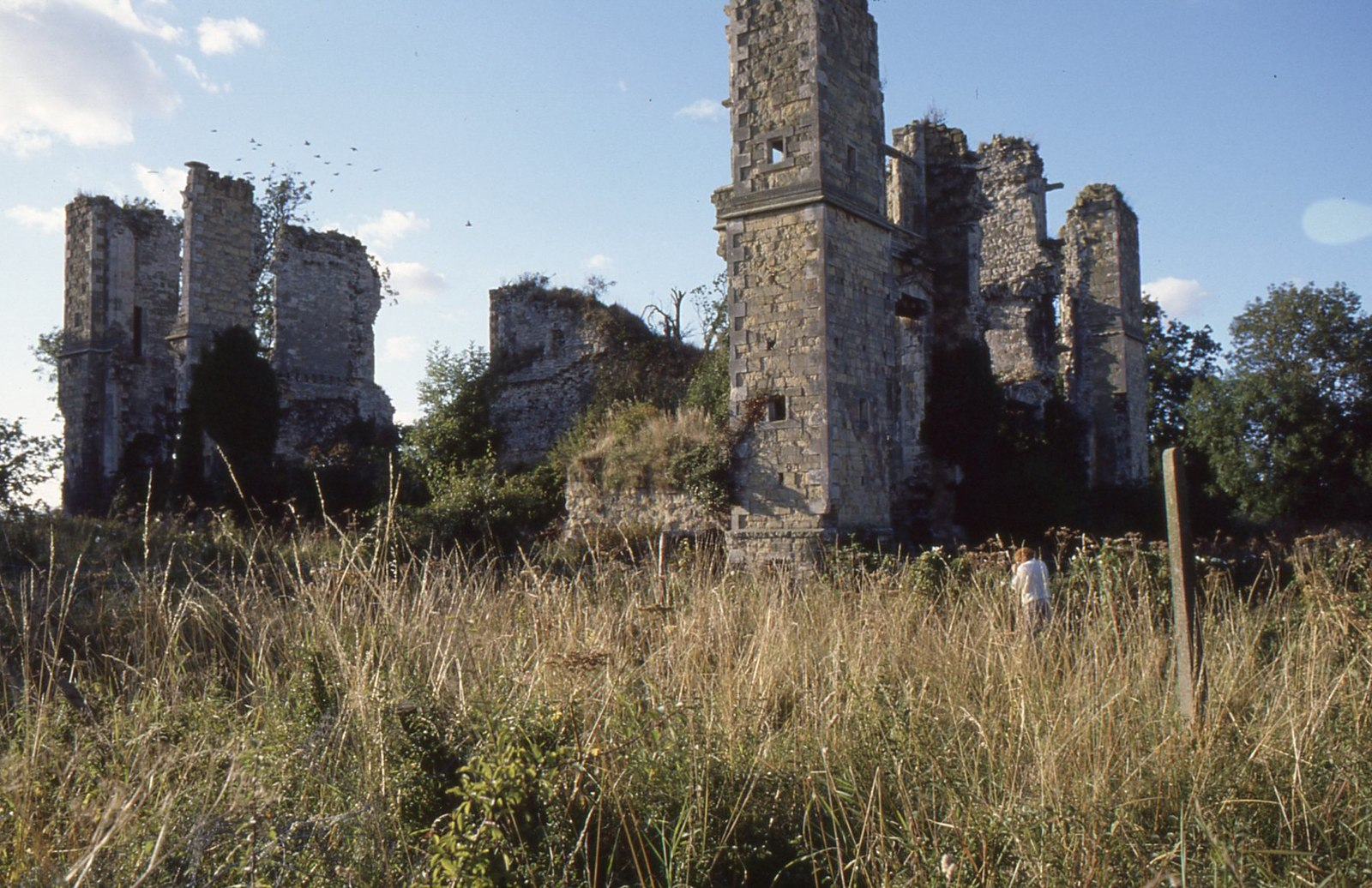
The building, in 1986

Slingsby Castle is a ruined building in Slingsby, North Yorkshire, a village in England.

Ralph Hastings was granted licence to crenellate his house in Slingsby in 1344. In 1474, William Hastings, 1st Baron Hastings was similarly granted a licence to crenellate the property. Only the dry remains of its moat survive: 22 metres wide and 3.4 metres deep on the north and west sides, slightly smaller and partly infilled to the east, and only 1 metre deep to the south, with that side infilled entirely at each end. In 1594, Charles Cavendish bought the ruined castle. When his son, also Charles Cavendish, inherited the building, he demolished it, commissioning John Smythson to design a new country house on the site. It is unlikely that the house was completed before it was slighted during the English Civil War. The ruins survive as a scheduled monument and a grade II listed building, but are also included on the Heritage at Risk Register as being in "very bad" and "declining" condition.

The ruins are built of limestone, and form a rectangular plan, 100 feet (30 m) by 66 feet (20 m), with corner projections. The window openings have quoined jambs and triangular pediments. There are the remains of a cornice with a decorated band. Most of the surviving remains are corner turrets and parts of the side walls. The basement was vaulted and contained a kitchen and two cellars. The main floor was divided into two sections and probably comprised a great hall and chamber, along with apartments.

== See also ==
- Listed buildings in Slingsby, North Yorkshire
