= James Farrer =

James Farrer may refer to:

- James Farrer (British politician) (1812–1879), Conservative Member of Parliament
- James Farrer (Australian politician) (1876–1967)
- James Anson Farrer (1849–1925), English barrister and writer

== See also ==
- James Farrar (disambiguation)
