= Ralph Hastings =

Ralph Hastings may refer to:

- Ralph Hastings (died 1346)
- Sir Ralph Hastings (died 1495)
- Ralph Hastings, character in Follow Me, Boys!
- Ralph Hastings of Kirby and Burton Hastings, MP for Yorkshire (UK Parliament constituency)
