= Thomas Bromflete =

Arms of Thomas Bromflete, as displayed on his monumental brass. Sable, a bend flory counterflory or.

Sir Thomas Bromflete (Note: Surname also shown as Brounflete, Brounflet or Bromflet) (died 31 December 1430), of Wymington, Bedfordshire, was an English landowner and royal official. He was Sheriff of Yorkshire, Cupbearer and Chief Butler and Constable of York Castle.

He was a son of William Bromflete and Ellen de Yarnewek. During his lifetime he acted as Sheriff of Yorkshire, Cupbearer and Chief Butler and amongst other royal duties was Constable of York Castle. He died on 31 December 1430 and was buried in the church at Wymington, Bedfordshire, where his monumental brass remains. His wife Margaret died on 22 October 1407, with her monumental brass beside her husband.

== Family ==
He married Margaret, daughter of Sir Edward St John and Anastasia de Aton, they had the following issue:

- Edward Bromflete, died without issue.
- Thomas Bromflete, died without issue.
- Henry Bromflete, married firstly Joan Holland, Duchess of York and secondly Eleanor FitzHugh.
- Joan Broomflete, married Thomas Fauconberge.
