= Listed buildings in Chevet, West Yorkshire =

Chevet is a civil parish in the metropolitan borough of the City of Wakefield, West Yorkshire, England. The parish contains four listed buildings that are recorded in the National Heritage List for England. All the listed buildings are designated at Grade II, the lowest of the three grades, which is applied to "buildings of national importance and special interest". The main building in the parish was Chevet Hall, but this was demolished in 1955. The parish does not contain any settlement, and the listed buildings consist of a farm, with a farmhouse and farm buildings, a gate lodge and associated structures, and a former boat house.

== Buildings ==
Name and location	Photograph	Date	Notes
Chevet Gates Lodge; 53.63915°N 1.47949°W	—	c. 1797	The lodge to Chevet Hall, which was demolished in 1955, is in stone with a hipped Welsh blue slate roof. There is a single storey, and fronts of three bays. The main front is symmetrical with engaged Tuscan columns, a frieze, a cornice, and a blocking course surmounted by a coat of arms flanked by curved brackets. In the outer bays are sash windows flanked by engaged Tuscan columns, and on the returns are Tuscan pilasters.
Chevet Grange Farm; 53.62712°N 1.47393°W	—	Late 18th to early 19th century	The farm consists of a complex of buildings around a courtyard in sandstone, with roofs mainly of stone slate. The farmhouse is at the east corner, and has two storeys and a basement, a double-depth plan, and hipped roofs, and it contains sash windows. The northwest range consists of a large two-storey threshing barn and stabling that contains two large arched openings with quoined jambs. Elsewhere there is a pair of former labourers' cottages.
The Boat House; 53.63576°N 1.49468°W		c. 1830	The former boat house is in stone with quoins, a chamfered cornice, embattled parapets, and a hipped stone slate roof with a decorative wrought iron finial. It is in Tudor style, and has a single storey and a basement, and three bays, the middle bay taller. In the basement of the middle bay is a segmental-arched gateway with a three-light mullioned window above. The outer bays contain two-light mullioned windows with arch-headed lights, sunken spandrels, and hood moulds. At the rear is a doorway with composite jambs approached by seven steps, and a dog kennel, and in the right return is a canted bay window.
Gates, gate piers and walls, Chevet Gates; 53.63918°N 1.47975°W		Undated	There are eight stone piers, diminishing in size from the centre, they are rusticated with cornices and caps. The gates are in cast iron, and there is an overthrow with a carriage lamp. From the centre piers, runs a low segmental wall with railings, and beyond are taller walls with chamfered coping.
