= Listed buildings in Clifton-on-Yore =

Clifton-on-Yore is a civil parish in the county of North Yorkshire, England. It contains nine listed buildings that are recorded in the National Heritage List for England. Of these, one is listed at Grade II*, the middle of the three grades, and the others are at Grade II, the lowest grade. There are no substantial settlements in the parish. The most important building is the country house Clifton Castle, which is listed, and most of the other listed buildings in the parish are associated with it.

== Key ==
Grade	Criteria
II*	Particularly important buildings of more than special interest
II	Buildings of national importance and special interest

== Buildings ==
Name and location	Photograph	Date	Notes	Grade
Castle wall, Clifton Castle; 54.25392°N 1.66693°W	—	Medieval (possible)	The wall is in stone, about 2.5 metres (8 ft 2 in) high, and is believed to be part of the original castle wall. It contains a gateway dating from about 1800, with an arch flanked by piers with pyramidal caps.	II
Grange Farm; 54.26032°N 1.66770°W		Late 18th century	The farmhouse is in stone with a stone slate roof. There are two storeys, three bays, and a single bay wing to the left. The doorway is in the wing, and the windows are sashes.	II
Halfpenny House; 54.25650°N 1.65636°W	—	Late 18th century	The house is in stone, and has a stone slate roof with stone coping. There are two storeys and three bays. The central doorway has an architrave, and the windows are sashes.	II
East Lodge; 54.25556°N 1.65740°W		1800	The lodge is in stone, and has a hipped stone slate roof. There is a single storey and three bays. The entrance on the side has a podium, and four Doric columns carrying a frieze, a cornice and a blocking course. The middle bay contains a sash window, and in the left bay is a porch under an entablature.	II
Gate piers, gates and railings, East Lodge; 54.25570°N 1.65742°W		1800	The entrance to the drive is flanked by stone gate piers, wrought iron railings on a stone plinth, and end piers. The main piers each has a plinth, a band, a frieze, a cornice and a shallow pyramidal cap, and the end piers are similar but smaller. The railings have bars with spear-headed finials, and dog bars.	II
Clifton Castle; 54.25341°N 1.66619°W		1802–10	A country house in stone, on a plinth, with a floor band, a dentilled eaves cornice, a parapet, and hipped stone slate roofs. The main range has two storeys and five bays. At the rear on the left is a service wing of two storeys and eight bays, at the rear on the right is a service wing with three storeys and four bays, and the courtyard at the rear is competed by single-storey service wings. In the middle three bays of the main range are a four giant Ionic columns carrying a frieze, and a pediment with a coat of arms. The central doorway has pilasters on plinths, a fanlight, friezes and a segmental pediment, and the windows are sashes. In the centre of the left return is a full-height three-bay bow window, and in the right return is a tripartite stair window, under which are three circular windows. In the middle of the rear wing is a basket arch with impost bands and a pyramidal roof.	II*
Dovecote and storage range, Clifton Castle; 54.25486°N 1.66773°W	—	1811	The dovecote and storage range are in stone with a stone slate roof. The dovecote has two storeys and one bay, and is flanked by single-storey wings, to the left with six bays, and to the right with two bays. The dovecote has quoins, and it contains a segmental-arched carriage door with impost bands, above which is a semicircular window, and a pyramidal roof surmounted by a small pavilion with pigeon holes and a pyramidal roof. The wings contain casement windows, and in the left wing are cart openings with segmental relieving arches.	II
Granary and cartshed, Clifton Castle; 54.25431°N 1.66760°W	—	1811	The granary and cartshed are in stone, and have a stone slate roof with stone coping and shaped kneelers. There are two storeys and three bays. In the ground floor are three cart openings with semicircular arches, and the upper floor contains a doorway with a segmental arch flanked by blind semicircular openings with top glazing.	II
Stables, Clifton Castle; 54.25423°N 1.66711°W		1811	The stable block is in stone with roofs of stone slate and tile. It consists of a main south range, and a parallel range to the north, connected by a wall on the east. The south wing has a central two-storey three -bay block flanked by single-storey single-bay wings, on the left is a single-storey three-bay range at right angles, and to the right is a pavilion. In the ground floor are stable doors in semicircular arches, and the upper floor contains a clock flanked by sash windows. The roof is hipped, and on it is an octagonal cupola with Doric columns, a frieze, a cornice, and a hemispherical roof with a weathervane. The pavilion has a hipped roof and contains a casement window in a relieving arch with an impost band.	II
