= Listed buildings in Fryton =

Fryton is a civil parish in the county of North Yorkshire, England. It contains four listed buildings that are recorded in the National Heritage List for England. All the listed buildings are designated at Grade II, the lowest of the three grades, which is applied to "buildings of national importance and special interest". The parish contains the village of Fryton and the surrounding countryside, and the listed buildings consist of two farmhouses, barns and a brick kiln.

== Buildings ==
Name and location	Photograph	Date	Notes
West Farmhouse; 54.16615°N 0.94836°W		Early 18th century	The farmhouse, which has been altered and extended, is in limestone and has a pantile roof. There are two storeys, four bays, and a cross-wing and a parallel range at the rear. On the front is a porch, three canted bay windows in the ground floor and three windows above. The house contains some re-used stone with mouldings.
Cherrygarth Farmhouse; 54.16625°N 0.94786°W		Mid 18th century	The farmhouse is in limestone, and has a pantile roof with gable coping. There are two storeys, three bays, and a rear cross-wing. In the centre is a doorway with a divided fanlight, it is flanked by canted bay windows, and in the upper floor are sash windows with channelled wedge lintels.
Barns, North Farm; 54.16660°N 0.94779°W		18th century	The barns are in limestone with pantile roofs. On the left is a two-bay storage barn, and to the right is a four-bay threshing barn. The left barn has a sliding door, the right barn has double doors, both under massive timber lintels. In the left barn are square vents, and the vents in the right barn are rectangular.
Brick kiln, Brickyard Farm; 54.17612°N 0.93442°W		c. 1840	The brick kiln is in limestone with brick dressings. There are two chambers about 3 metres (9.8 ft) to 4 metres (13 ft) high, with a round-arched entrance at each end, and brick barrel vaults. Outside, there are twelve round-arched flues.
