= Listed buildings in Slingsby, North Yorkshire =

Slingsby is a civil parish in the county of North Yorkshire, England. It contains 32 listed buildings that are recorded in the National Heritage List for England. Of these, one is listed at Grade II*, the middle of the three grades, and the others are at Grade II, the lowest grade. The parish contains the village of Slingsby and the surrounding area. All the listed buildings are in the village, and most are houses, cottages and associated structures. The others include a church, a chest tomb in the churchyard, the ruins of a country house, a public house, a schoolroom and a school house, a reading room, a chapel and an associated hall, and a milepost.

== Key ==
Grade	Criteria
II*	Particularly important buildings of more than special interest
II	Buildings of national importance and special interest

== Buildings ==
Name and location	Photograph	Date	Notes	Grade
Ruins of Slingsby Castle; 54.16512°N 0.93537°W		1620s	A country house now in ruins. The ruins are in limestone, and form a rectangular plan with corner projections. The window openings have quoined jambs and triangular pediments. There are the remains of a cornice with a decorated band. Most of the surviving remains are corner turrets and parts of the side walls.	II
Wyville Hall and Wyville Cottage; 54.16511°N 0.93080°W	—	17th century	A house, later divided into two, in limestone with a tile roof. There are two storeys and five bays. On the front are two doorways, and the windows are a mix of casements, and horizontally sliding sashes, and there is a fire window.	II
Porch Farmhouse and cottage 54.16458°N 0.93267°W	—	Early 18th century	The house, later divided into two, is in limestone with a pantile roof. There are two storeys and four bays, and a rear outshut. On the front is a gabled porch, and to the right is a doorway with a divided fanlight. The windows are casements, and the ground floor openings have cambered lintels and keystones.	II
The Old Rectory; 54.16649°N 0.93401°W	—	Early 18th century	The rectory, later a private house, is in limestone on a plinth, with quoins, a floor band, an eaves band, and a roof of Welsh slate and pantile with gable coping and shaped kneelers. There are three storeys and five bays, the middle bay projecting under a pediment, and a rear cross wing. Steps lead up to the central doorway hat has a fanlight, the windows are sashes, and all the openings have Gibbs surrounds and stepped keystones.	II
Tomb chest 54.16585°N 0.93427°W	—	c. 1730	The tomb chest is in the churchyard of all Saints' church, to the south of the church. It commemorates members of the Markinfield family, and is in limestone with rectangular plan. On each side are recessed inscribed plates, at the corners are moulded posts with strapwork decoration, and at the diagonals are tapering balusters supporting a slab with moulded edges.	II
Fern Cottage; 54.16652°N 0.93220°W	—	Mid-18th century	The house is in limestone, and has a swept pantile roof with gable coping and shaped kneelers. There are two storeys and five bays. On the front is a doorway, above it is a blind window, the windows in the left bay are casements, and the other windows are sashes.	II
Grange House; 54.16800°N 0.93225°W	—	Mid-18th century	The house is in limestone with a pantile roof. There is a single storey and attics, two bays, and a continuous rear outshut. In the centre is a gabled porch flanked by horizontally sliding sash windows with wedge lintels and keystones. Above are two gabled dormers with casements.	II
House south of Goodlands; 54.16865°N 0.93218°W	—	Mid-18th century	The house is in limestone with a stepped eaves course and a pantile roof. There are two storeys and four bays, and two outshuts. On the front are two doorways, the left with a divided fanlight. The windows are sash windows, and all the openings have lintels and keystones.	II
Glebe Cottage; 54.16448°N 0.93415°W	—	Mid to late 18th century	The house is in limestone with a pantile roof. There are two storeys and three bays, and the entrance is at the rear. On the ground floor are sash windows, the left horizontally sliding, and the upper floor windows are casements. On the left gable end is a blocked doorway.	II
Ivy Cottage and Castle House; 54.16446°N 0.93463°W	—	Mid to late 18th century	A pair of houses in limestone, with an M-shaped pantile roof. There are two storeys, two parallel ranges, a front of four bays, and a rear cross wing. The doorway is in the third bay, the windows are sashes, and most of the openings have wedge lintels.	II
Castle Farmhouse; 54.16378°N 0.93489°W	—	Late 18th century	The house is in limestone, and has a pantile roof with gable coping and shaped kneelers. There are two storeys, three bays, and a rear cross wing and an outshut. The central doorway has a divided fanlight and a stone arch. The windows are sashes, most with wedge lintels.	II
House north of the former stores 54.16608°N 0.93200°W	—	Late 18th century	The house is in limestone with a pantile roof. There are two storeys, two bays, and a rear wing and outshut. The doorway is in the centre, and the windows are sashes with timber lintels.	II
Slingsby Heights; 54.16214°N 0.93506°W	—	Late 18th century	The house, which was extended in the mid-19th century, is in limestone with a Welsh slate roof, and two storeys. The earlier part on the left has two bays, gable coping and shaped kneelers. It contains sash windows with wedge lintels. The later range is slightly lower, with two bays and a rear cross wing. On the ground floor is a canted bay window, to its right is a tripartite sash window, and on the upper floor are sash windows.	II
The Grapes; 54.16663°N 0.93255°W		Late 18th century	The public house is in limestone on a plinth, and has a swept pantile roof with gable coping and shaped kneelers. There are two storeys and three bays, and a single-storey range to the left. The doorway has a fanlight, and a hood on decorative consoles. The windows in the main range are sash window, in the left range is a tripartite window, and all the windows have wedge lintels.	II
Wheatlands Farmhouse; 54.16547°N 0.93181°W	—	Late 18th century	The house is in limestone on a plinth, and has a pantile roof with gable coping and shaped kneelers. There are two storeys and two bays, and a rear cross wing. On the front is a doorway, the windows are sashes, and the ground floor openings have wedge lintels.	II
Heights Farmhouse; 54.16329°N 0.93502°W	—	Late 18th to early 19th century	The house is in limestone, and has a pantile roof with gable coping and shaped kneelers. There are two storeys and three bays. The doorway is in the centre, the windows are sashes, and all the openings have channelled wedge lintels.	II
Bag End; 54.16422°N 0.93433°W	—	Early 19th century	The house is in limestone with a pantile roof. There are two storeys and two bays. The doorway is in the centre, the windows are sashes, and the ground floor openings have wedge lintels.	II
Bransdale; 54.16418°N 0.93435°W	—	Early 19th century	The house is in limestone, and has a pantile roof with gable coping and shaped kneelers on the right. There are two storeys and two bays. The doorway is in the centre, the windows are sashes, and the ground floor openings have wedge lintels.	II
Dossers House; 54.16438°N 0.93328°W	—	Early 19th century	The house is in limestone with a pantile roof. There are two storeys and attics, and two bays. The central doorway has an architrave, a hood on decorative consoles, and a frieze flanked by cartouches. The windows are sashes with flat lintels, and there are two flat-headed dormers.	II
Rose Cottage and Laurel Cottage; 54.16846°N 0.93178°W	—	Early 19th century	A pair of houses in limestone with a pantile roof. There are two storeys and four bays, the outer bays slightly recessed, and two rear cross wings. On the front are two doorways, and the windows are sashes, mostly horizontally sliding.	II
The Cottage and three houses to the north 54.16843°N 0.93212°W	—	Early 19th century	A row of four cottages in limestone with a pantile roof. There are two storeys and five bays. On the front are four doorways, and the windows are a mix of casements, and horizontally sliding sashes.	II
The Green; 54.16504°N 0.93278°W	—	Early 19th century (probable)	The house is in limestone, and has a hipped Welsh slate roof with overhanging eaves. There are two storeys and three bays. In the centre is a doorway, and the windows are sashes with wedge lintels. The right return has two bays, a doorway and two-light windows, all with stepped keystones.	II
Toby's Cottage; 54.16624°N 0.93183°W	—	Early 19th century	The house is in limestone, with some earlier internal timber framing, sprocketed eaves and a pantile roof. There are two storeys and three bays. The doorway is in the centre, and the windows are horizontally sliding sashes.	II
West Flatts Farmhouse; 54.16231°N 0.93550°W	—	Early 19th century	The house is in limestone, and has a roof of pantile and Welsh slate, with gable coping and shaped kneelers. There are two storeys and three bays, and a lower two-storey two-bay wing to the right. In the centre of the main block is a doorway with a divided fanlight, in the wing is another doorway, the windows in both parts are sashes, and all the openings have wedge lintels.	II
Home Farmhouse; 54.16740°N 0.93236°W	—	c. 1830–40	The house is in limestone, with a Welsh slate roof. There are two storeys and three bays. The central doorway has pilasters, a fanlight, a frieze and a hood. The windows are sashes with wedge lintels.	II
Grey Gables; 54.16369°N 0.93457°W	—	Early to mid-19th century	The house is in limestone, and has an M-shaped Welsh slate roof with gable coping and shaped kneelers. There are two storeys and three bays. The doorway on the left has a fanlight, the windows are sashes, and all the openings have wedge lintels.	II
Lindon House, gate and railings 54.16447°N 0.93302°W	—	c. 1840	The house is in limestone with a Welsh slate roof. There are two storeys and three bays, and a rear cross wing. The central doorway has a fanlight and a hood on corbels, and the windows are sashes with wedge lintels. Enclosing the area to the front of the house are cast iron railings and a gate.	II
Schoolroom and school house 54.16475°N 0.93312°W	—	Mid-19th century	The schoolroom and house are in limestone with Welsh slate roofs. The schoolroom has a single storey, three bays, and a lower entrance bay on the right. The windows are paired sashes with stepped keystones, and the doorway has a divided fanlight and a stepped keystone. The roof has gable coping, shaped kneelers, ball finials and a gable bell. The house has two storeys and three bays, the middle bay projecting and gabled. The door has a divided fanlight and the windows are sashes, and the openings have quoined jambs. The gables have decorative bargeboards and finials.	II
The Reading Room; 54.16499°N 0.93333°W	—	Mid-19th century (probable)	The building is in limestone with Welsh slate roofs, and a single storey. The middle range has two bays, the roof has gable copings, shaped kneelers and ball finials, and it contains sash windows. The main range is flanked by lower two-bay wings with low parapets and flat roofs, and each wing contains a doorway with a fanlight and a sash window. All the openings have stepped keystones.	II
Wesleyan Chapel and hall 54.16468°N 0.93226°W	—	1837	The chapel and hall are in limestone with Welsh slate roofs, and a single storey. The chapel is on the right and contains a central gabled porch and a doorway with a pointed arch, above which is an inscribed and dated plaque, and it is flanked by three-light windows with pointed arches. To the left is a lower two-bay angled range, with a doorway and sash windows. Further to the left is a taller two-bay hall with a stepped buttress, and sash windows. Both the chapel and the hall have gable copings, shaped kneelers, and ball finials.	II
All Saints' Church; 54.16596°N 0.93421°W		1869	The church was rebuilt incorporating fragments from the earlier church. It is built in sandstone, and consists of a nave with a clerestory, north and south aisles, a south porch, a chancel with a south chapel and a north organ chamber and vestry, and a west tower. The tower has three stages, stepped diagonal buttresses, the north incorporating a stair turret, and string courses. On the west front is a large window with a pointed arch, a clock face on the south of the middle stage and a small trefoil-headed window, two-light bell openings with square heads, and a decorated embattled parapet, with corner crocketed pinnacles, projecting animal sculptures and gargoyles.	II*
Milepost; 54.16220°N 0.93192°W		Late 19th century	The milepost on the north side of the B1257 road has a triangular plan and a sloping top, On both sides are pointing hands, the left side has the distance to Malton, and the right side to Helmsley.	II
