= John Clayton Cowell =

Sir John Clayton Cowell KCB PC
- Born: 14 January 1832; Blean, Canterbury, Kent
- Died: 29 August 1894; East Cowes, Isle of Wight
- Military career
- Allegiance: United Kingdom
- Branch: Royal Engineers
- Service years: 1850–1879
- Rank: Major-General
- Conflicts: Crimean War
- Other work: Master of the Queen's Household

Major-General Sir John Clayton Cowell PC KCB (14 January 1832 – 29 August 1894) was a British Army officer and later Master of the Queen's Household and lieutenant-governor of Windsor Castle.

== Early life ==
Clayton was born at Blean, near Canterbury, in 1832, the son of John Clayton Cowell and Frances Ann Hester, daughter of the Rev. Richard Brickenden. He was educated at the Royal Military Academy at Woolwich. In 1850, he joined the Royal Engineers, he served with the Baltic fleet and at Crimea, where he was aide-de-camp to General Sir Harry Jones and where he wounded himself on 10 August 1854 by accidentally discharging a revolver he had borrowed from Bartholomew Sulivan. He was sent to recuperate on the hospital ship Belleisle.

== Royal household ==
Clayton returned to England, and from 1856 to 1866 he became governor to the young Prince Alfred, who in 1866 became the Duke of Edinburgh. Clayton performed the same role for a year with Prince Leopold until Leopold became 21. For his duties with the royal princess, he was appointed a Knight Commander of the Order of the Bath.

In 1866 Clayton was appointed as Master of the Queen's Household and he retired from the Army in 1879 with the honorary rank of major-general. In 1892, he was appointed lieutenant-governor of Windsor Castle. He was, with the Queen's permission, responsible for having electric lights installed at Windor Castle. The town of Cowell, South Australia, was named in his honour.

== Family life ==
He married Georgiana Elizabeth Pulleine in 1868, the only child of James Pulleine of Clifton Castle at Clifton-on-Yore, Yorkshire, which Georgiana inherited. They had two sons and two daughters. Queen Victoria was godmother to their eldest son, Albert Victor John (born 12 June 1869).

He died in 1894 at East Cowes on the Isle of Wight due to heart failure. His son Albert succeeded to the Clifton Castle estate.

Court offices
Preceded by Sir Thomas Biddulph	Master of the Household; 1866–1894	Succeeded by Lord Edward Pelham-Clinton
