= William Harrington (knight) =

English northern knight

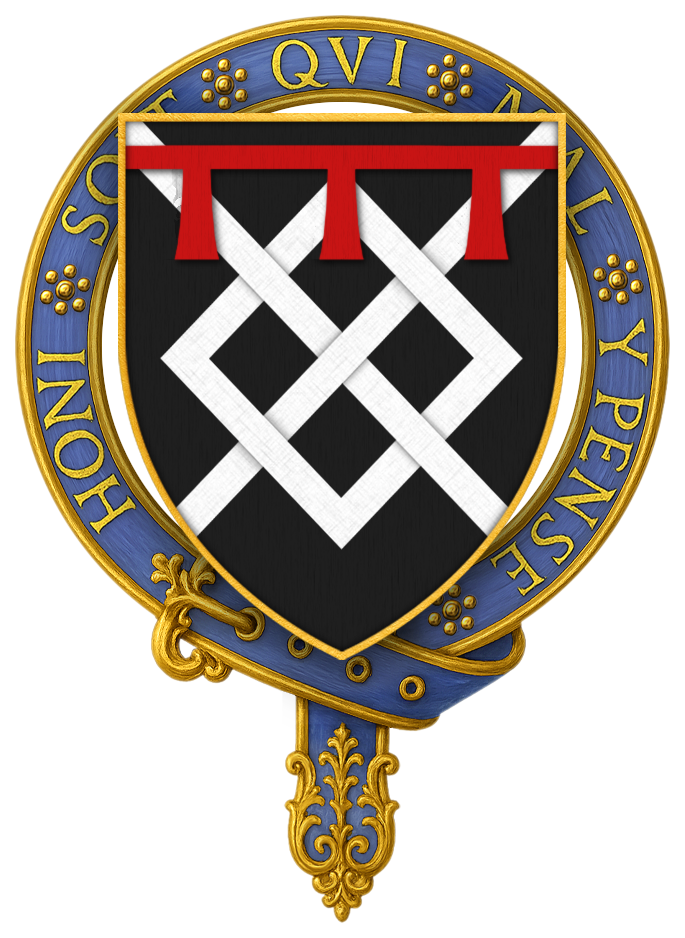
Garter arms of Sir William Haryngton

Sir William Harrington (Sometimes spelt Harington or Haryngton) of Hornby (born 1373 and died 22 February 1439/1440 in Hornby Castle, Lancashire) was an early fifteenth-century English northern knight, fighting in the Hundred Years' War and serving the crown in the north of England. He was also an official Standard Bearer of England. The son of Sir Nicholas Harrington and Isabella/Isabel de Engleys/English, he was likely named after his maternal grandfather, William de Engleys, William Harrington

Harrington's mother, Isabella/Isabel, was born c. 1345 at Drumburgh Castle the only surviving child of Sir William de Engleys/English of Appleby (Appleby-in-Westmorland), Little Strickland, and Hasket (Hesket, Cumbria), then all in Westmorland. He was also Knight of the Shire for Westmorland. William de Engleys was born c. 1320 at High Head Castle, Co. Cumberland and his first wife (and Isabel's mother) was Margaret Le Brun born c. 1320 in Drumburgh Castle. Isabel was co-heiress to her uncle, Robert le Brun, by which she inherited the manor of Drumburgh and a one-third share in the manors of Bothel, Cumbria (in Blennerhasset and Torpenhow), Beaumont, Cumbria, and Brunskaith (Brunstock) in Cumberland.

== Career history and wars in France ==
Harrington's father, Sir Nicholas, was a supporter of John of Gaunt and Harrington continued this tradition of service with the future Henry V. He served Henry V whilst the latter was Prince of Wales, and when Henry came to the throne in 1413, Harrington was a king's knight. He was considered to be one of the most trusted nobles and, as such, was appointed to hold the official office of Standard Bearer of England. Some of his predecessors in the role were men like Peter de Preaux and Richard Fitzhugh. Some of the men succeededing him in the role were men such as Sir Lewis Robessart and Sir William Burton. The role of standard-bearer of England was an important office within an army especially when monarchs fought or were present on the battlefield. On the battlefield, the standard-bearer would be mounted and carried the personal standard of the monarch.

In 1415 he fought at the Battle of Agincourt holding the king's standard, having previously been at the Siege of Harfleur. In 1416 he served in Henry's campaign to rescue Harfleur and finally on another of Henry V's Normandy campaigns, he was seriously wounded at the Siege of Rouen (1418–1419) where again he had acted as standard-bearer.

For his loyalty and valour at Agincourt, in 1416/17 he was elected (along with fourteen other knights who served at Agincourt) to the Order of the Garter as a knight of the Garter. The stall plates of eleven of these knights can be seen in the Quire of St George's Chapel, Windsor Castle although the remainder no longer survive, perhaps lost in the move from the original St George's Chapel to the current Chapel constructed by Edward IV of England. Sir William's personal garter number is 123 and on the shield of his garter arms is the Harrington knot.

== Family ==
Harrington married Margaret Neville of Hornby, Lancashire. She was the daughter of Sir Robert Neville of the House of Neville who was Sheriff of Yorkshire and Constable of Pontefract Castle. Her mother was Margaret de la Pole daughter of William de la Pole (Chief Baron of the Exchequer). His new wife was not initially an heiress, however, through the death of her niece and great-nephew, she became a co-heiress with Sir John Langton of the family estates, and Harrington, jure uxoris, eventually gained Hornby Castle in 1433. His marriage also gave him a connection to the Duke of Exeter, husband of Margaret's niece. They had one son and four daughters and around 1420 he married his heir Thomas to his newly acquired ward, Elizabeth Dacre (daughter of Thomas Dacre and Jane Banastre and granddaughter of Edmund Dacre), which brought him in (dower) Dacre's manors of Heysham and Tatham. He died in 1440, testate.

== Royal service and offices ==
Harrington was sheriff of Yorkshire four times from 1408, and was appointed to various royal offices in the Duchy of Lancaster in Lancashire, including the important position of chief-steward of the north in 1428. In 1423, he had been part of a committee to negotiate with the Scots over the intended release of James I, who had been captured by the English on his way to France in 1408. Four years later, he led an embassy to James in an attempt to make him pay the balance of his ransom.
