= The Grapes, Slingsby =

Pub in Slingsby, North Yorkshire, England

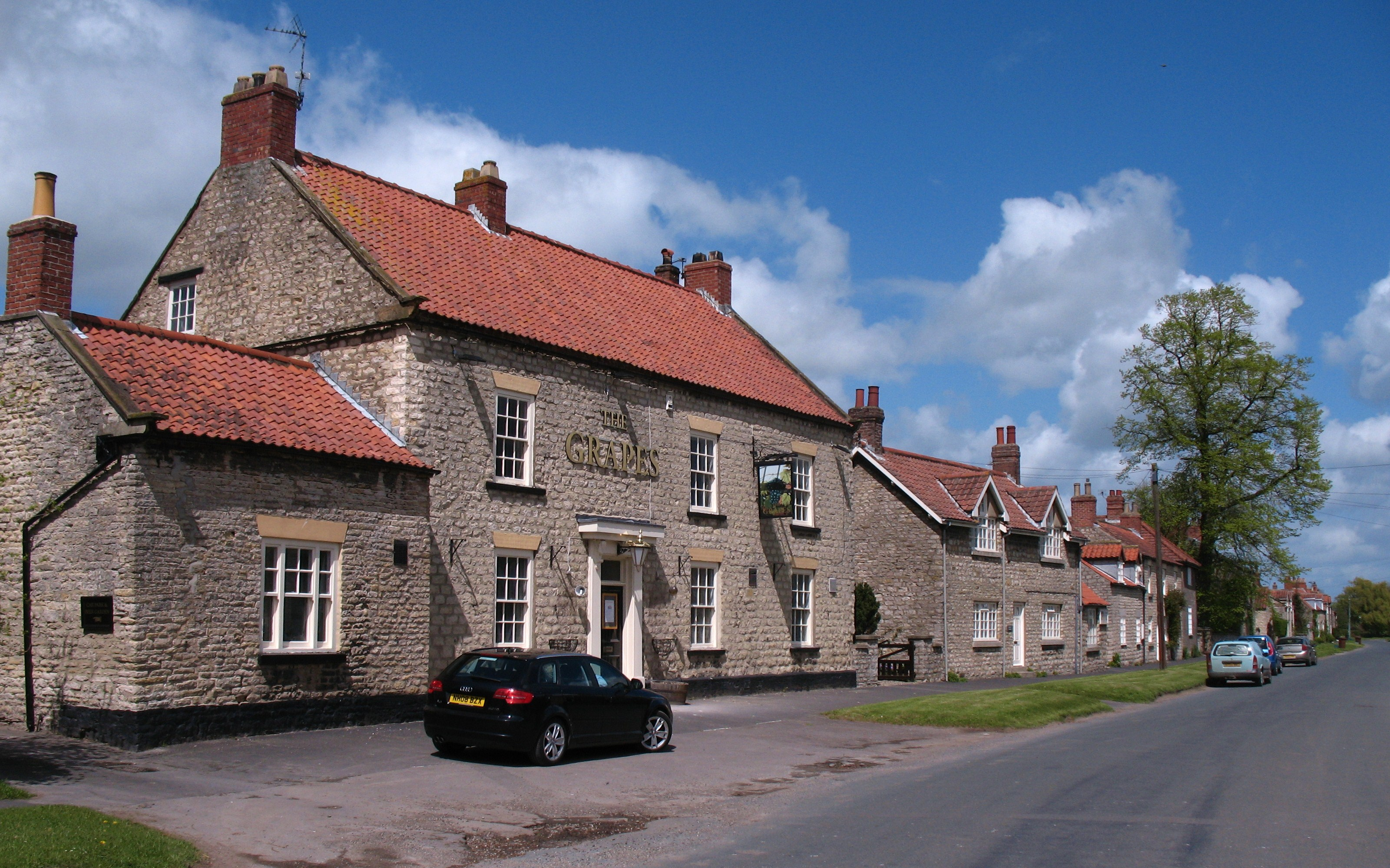
The pub, in 2012

The Grapes is a historic pub in Slingsby, North Yorkshire, a village in England.

The Grapes was first licensed as a brewhouse in 1759, while the current building dates from the late 18th century. The interior is divided into several rooms, and has tiled floors, fireplaces, an assortment of furniture including a Robert Thompson chair, and decorative objects. As of 2023, the pub served a variety of real ales, and food from a pizza oven in the beer garden. The pub hosts a variety of music events, including a monthly session for local musicians. The building was grade II listed in 1987.

The pub is built of limestone on a plinth, and has a swept pantile roof with gable coping and shaped kneelers. There are two storeys and three bays, and a single-storey range to the left. The doorway has a fanlight, and a hood on decorative consoles. The windows in the main range are sash window, in the left range is a tripartite window, and all the windows have wedge lintels.

== See also ==
- Listed buildings in Slingsby, North Yorkshire
