= Fryton =

Village and civil parish in North Yorkshire, England

Coordinates: 54.166340°N 0.948020°W

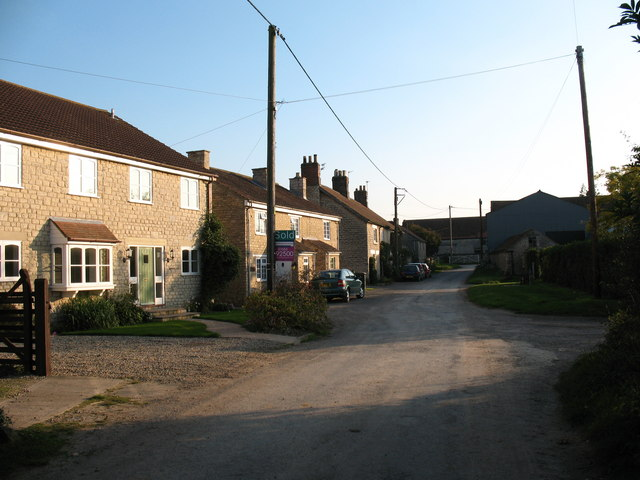
- Modern housing in Fryton

- Location within North Yorkshire
- OS grid reference: SE687750
- Civil parish: Fryton
- Unitary authority: North Yorkshire
- Ceremonial county: North Yorkshire
- Region: Yorkshire and the Humber
- Country: England
- Sovereign state: United Kingdom
- Post town: YORK
- Postcode district: YO62
- Police: North Yorkshire
- Fire: North Yorkshire
- Ambulance: Yorkshire
- UK Parliament: Thirsk and Malton

Fryton is a small village and civil parish in North Yorkshire, England with a population of around 50. This population remained less than 100 at the 2011 Census. Details are included Slingsby (see below). It is located in its own Civil parish 0.5 miles (0.8 km) west of Slingsby and 3.7 miles (6 km) north of the prominent estate of Castle Howard.

Because of its small size it is often associated with Slingsby for purposes such as the official Census and is part of the Ecclesiastical Parish of Slingsby All Saints.

The name Fryton is the same derivation as Fritton; from Old English meaning enclosure or enclosed space.

The village is in a rural location and the parish is predominantly agricultural with potatoes forming an important crop.

In 2005 Cherrygarth Farm started to diversify from potatoes and converted dis-used farm buildings into luxury holiday accommodation. These went on to win the Yorkshire Tourist Board's award for Best Newcomer to Tourism in 2006.

Despite its small size Fryton features in the history of Yorkshire railways. The Thirsk and Malton Line passed through Fryton until it closed to passenger traffic in 1931. It was recorded that on 31 July 1961, a crossing keeper was killed at Fryton crossing.

== Millennium project ==
This project combined an initial historical survey with a heritage trail. The trail was accompanied by three heritage mosaics, benches and interpretative leaflets.

The group carried out preliminary studies of the immediate area before starting the project. These studies uncovered a number of tumuli, earthworks, outline details of a former railway, and Viking, Roman and Neolithic connections.

== History ==
Bulmer's History and Directory of North Yorkshire (1890) describes Fryton as follows; "FRYTON is a township in this parish, situated about 1½ miles E. of Hovingham. Its estimated extent is 1,297 acres, and its rateable value, £1,285. The Earl of Carlisle is lord of the manor and sole owner. The township comprises three farms and nine cottages, containing 93 inhabitants. The soil is in parts clay and limestone."

Between 1974 and 2023 the village was part of the Ryedale district, it is now administered by the unitary North Yorkshire Council.

== See also ==
- Listed buildings in Fryton
