= Clifton Castle =

Country house in Clifton-on-Yore, North Yorkshire, England

Coordinates: 54.2534°N 1.6662°W

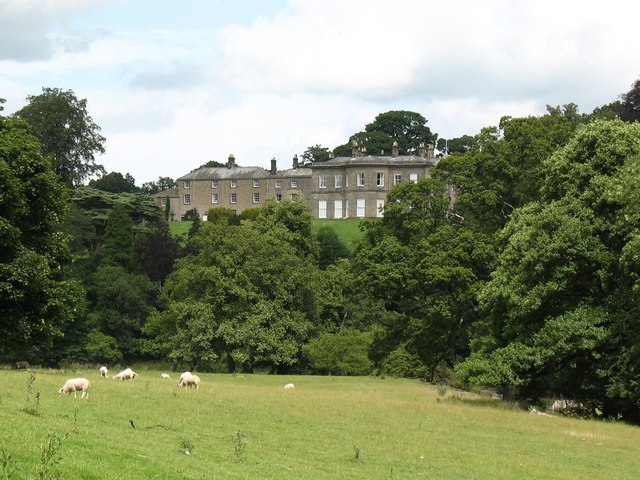
The building, in 2009

Clifton Castle is a country house in Clifton-on-Yore, a civil parish in North Yorkshire, England.

== History ==
Clifton Castle was built in the 14th century by the Scrope family. It was demolished in the 18th century, other than foundations in the cellars of the current house, and a single piece of wall.

The estate was purchased in 1735 from the Preston family by Timothy Hutton of Marske, who demolished the castle and commissioned John Foss to build the present Grecian style house in 1802. On Hutton's death without heirs in 1863 the Clifton estate passed to his barrister cousin James Pulleine. His only daughter Georgina married Major-General Sir John Clayton Cowell, Master of the Queen's Household. Sir John died in 1894 and his widow continued to live at the house. Their son Albert Victor succeeded them. At some point in the late 19th century, the windows were replaced, and the rear left wing was extended by four bays.

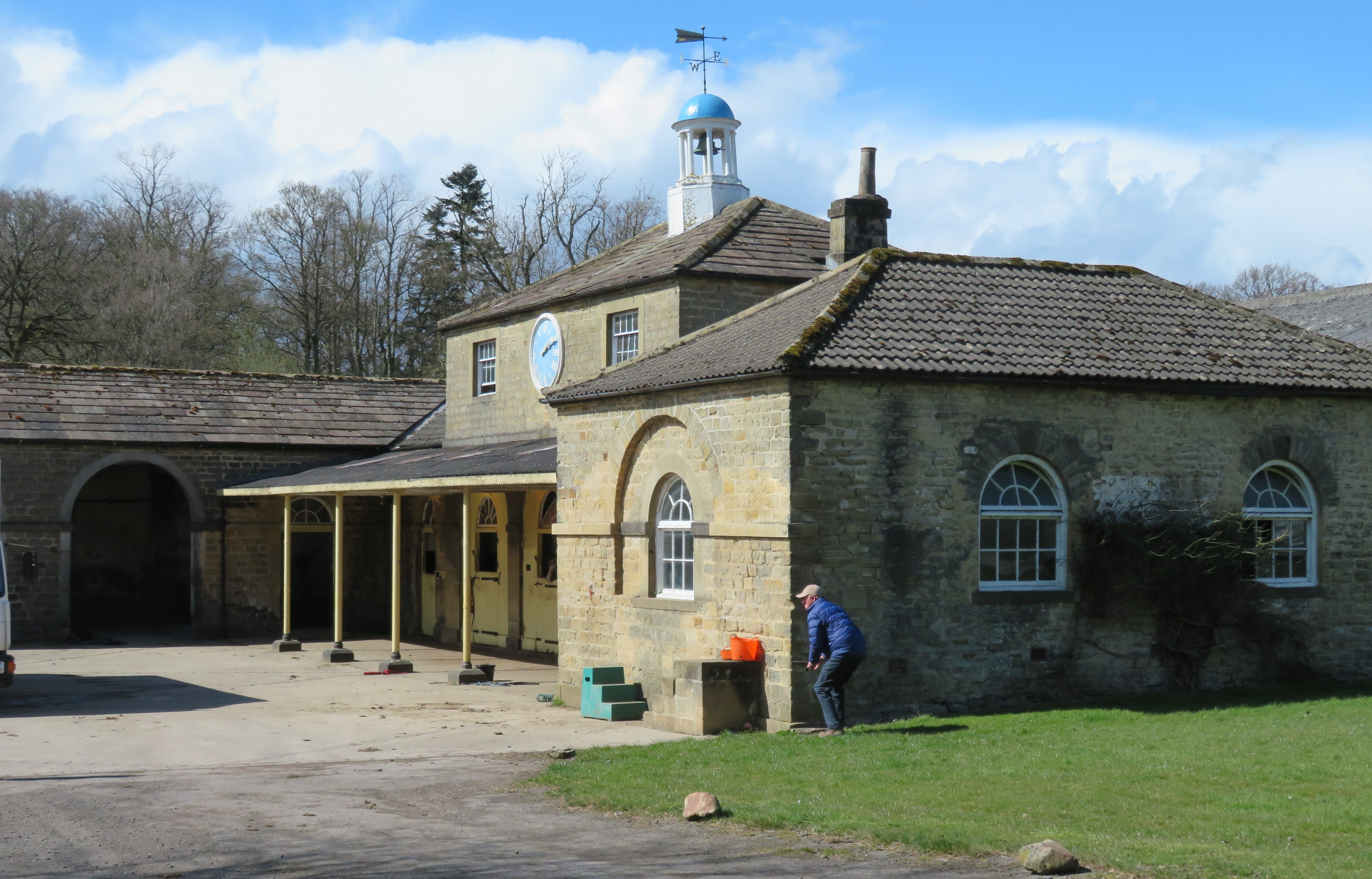
Stable block

The estate was then purchased around 1970 by the 8th Marquess of Downshire and passed down to his son, Nick, 9th Marquess of Downshire, who lives there with his family Janey, Isabella, Beatrice, Edmund and Claudia.

The house was Grade II* listed in 1952. It has extensive grounds, including woods with bridges, follies and cascades, woods and recently-planted wildflower meadows. The grounds are occasionally open to the public through the National Gardens Scheme, and the house is also open for occasional tours.

== Architecture ==
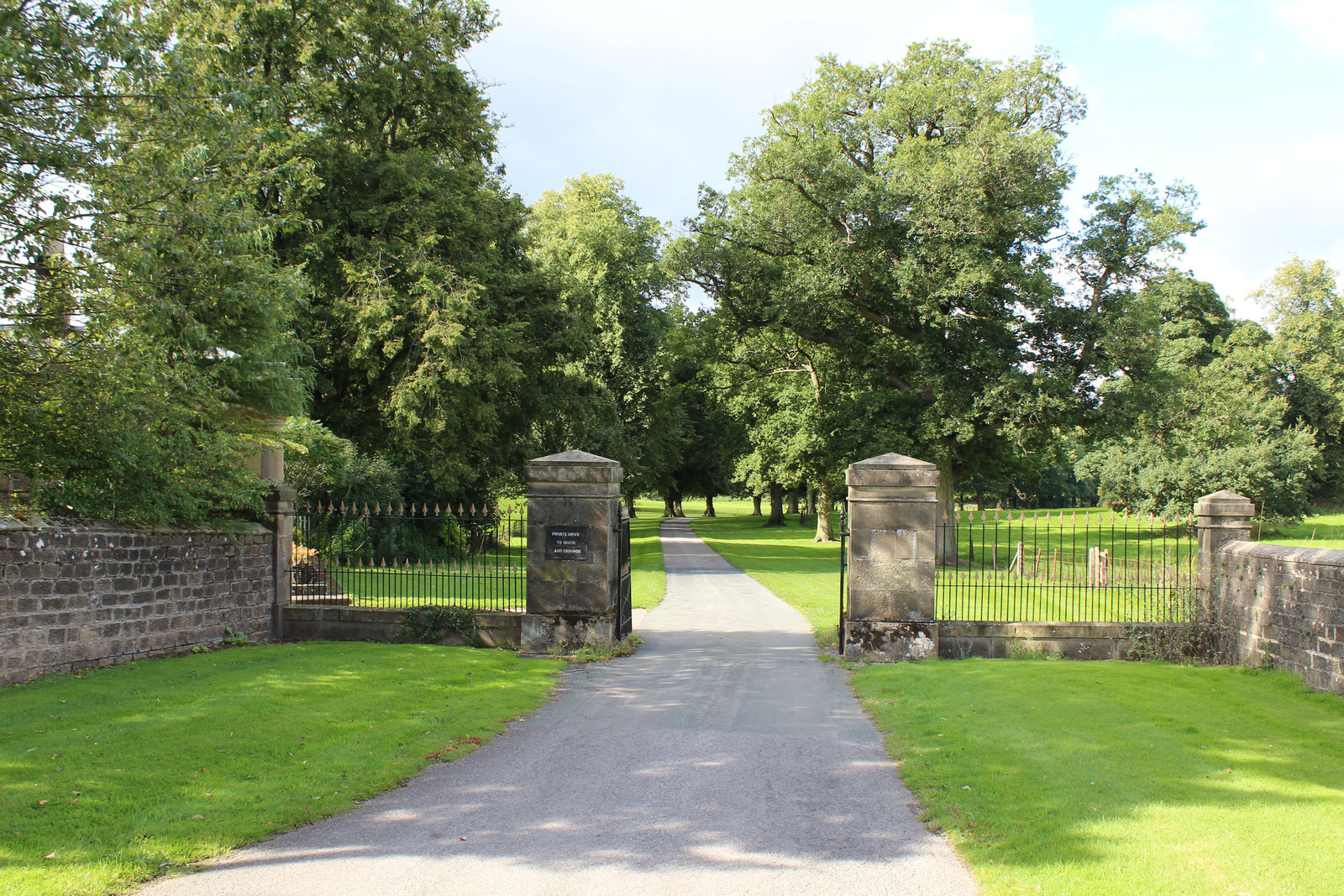
East entrance to the estate

The house is constructed of stone, on a plinth, with a floor band, a dentilled eaves cornice, a parapet, and hipped stone slate roofs. The main range has two storeys and five bays. At the rear on the left is a service wing of two storeys and eight bays, at the rear on the right is a service wing with three storeys and four bays, and the courtyard at the rear is competed by single-storey service wings. In the middle three bays of the main range are a four giant Ionic columns carrying a frieze, and a pediment with a coat of arms. The central doorway has pilasters on plinths, a fanlight, friezes and a segmental pediment, and the windows are sashes. In the centre of the left return is a full-height three-bay bow window, and in the right return is a tripartite stair window, under which are three circular windows. In the middle of the rear wing is a basket arch with impost bands and a pyramidal roof.

The surviving medieval castle wall is built of stone, and is about 2.5 metres (8 ft 2 in) high and is Grade II listed. It contains a gateway dating from about 1800, with an arch flanked by piers with pyramidal caps.

== See also ==
- Grade II* listed buildings in North Yorkshire (district)
- Listed buildings in Clifton-on-Yore
