= James Farrar =

James Farrar may refer to:

- James Farrar (poet) (1923–1944), English poet
- James Farrar (actor) (born 1987), English actor
- Jimmy Farrar (1950–2018), American singer, songwriter and musician

== See also ==
- James Farrer (disambiguation)
