= William Vavasour =

English politician

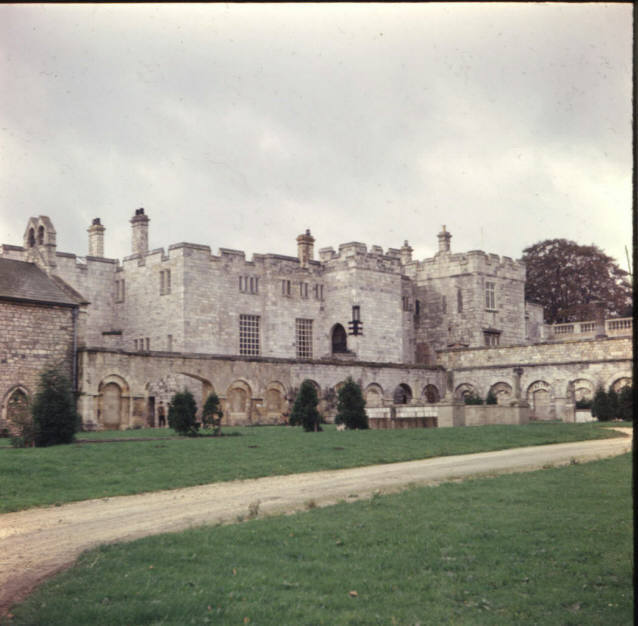
Hazlewood Castle, the Vavasour seat

Sir William Vavasour (1514–1566), of Hazlewood, Yorkshire was an English politician.

He was the son of John Vavasour of Hazlewood Castle, Aberford, Yorkshire and his wife Brianna, daughter of Henry Scrope, 6th Baron Scrope of Bolton and succeeded his father in 1524. He was knighted in 1544.

He was a justice of the peace for the West Riding of Yorkshire from 1542 and for the East Riding from 1561 and High Sheriff of Yorkshire for 1548–49 and 1563–64. He was a member of the Council of the North from 1553 to his death.

He was elected a member of parliament (MP) for Yorkshire in October 1553 (until 1554).

He died in 1566. He had married Elizabeth, the daughter of Anthony Calverley, with whom he had at least six sons and five daughters.

Their daughter Lady Eleanor Slingsby, married Arthur Ingraham or Ingram Sir Controller of The Customs of The Port of London (who was the something grandson of Arthur Ingram).
