= Gamel, Sheriff of York =

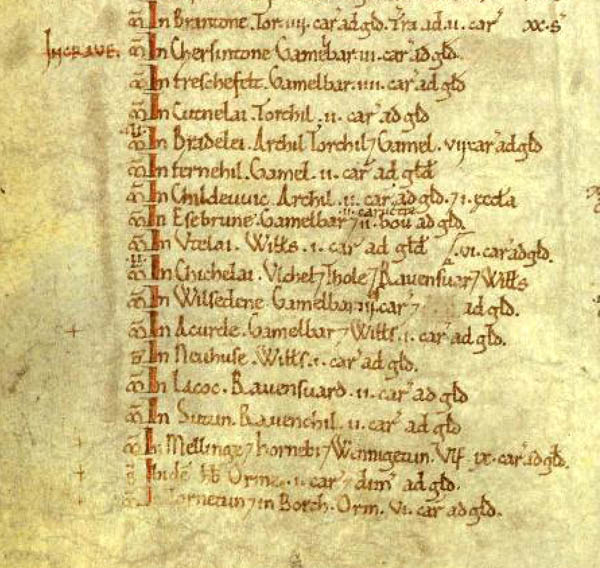
File:Domesday Book folio 301v.

Gamel, son of Osbern was High Sheriff of Yorkshire in 1066. He remained Sheriff of Yorkshire till 1068 and may have been the last Anglo Saxon Sheriff allowed to remain in office.

Gamel was son of Osbern, a king’s thegn (sometimes referred to in the Normanized form Gamel FitzOsbern) and Gamel was a substantial Yorkshire landowner at the time of the Domesday Survey.

He may have been the unnamed Sheriff who Ealdred (archbishop of York) complained to William about. The complaint was that the Sheriff had been appropriating treasures from the churches of York.

At some point between 1067 and 1068 Gamel was informed in a writ by William the Conqueror that

Archbishop Ealdred should draw up a privilegium for the lands belonging to the church of St John of Beverley and that they shall be free from the demands of the king, his reeves, and all his men, except for those of the archbishop and priests of the church.

The Church of St Johns at Beverley was at this time a large and influential monastery founded about 700 AD by Saint John of Beverley.

He may have been deprived of lands to a purge of the northern nobility in 1070.
