= All Saints' Church, Slingsby =

Church in Slingsby, North Yorkshire, England

Coordinates: 54°09′57″N 0°56′03″W

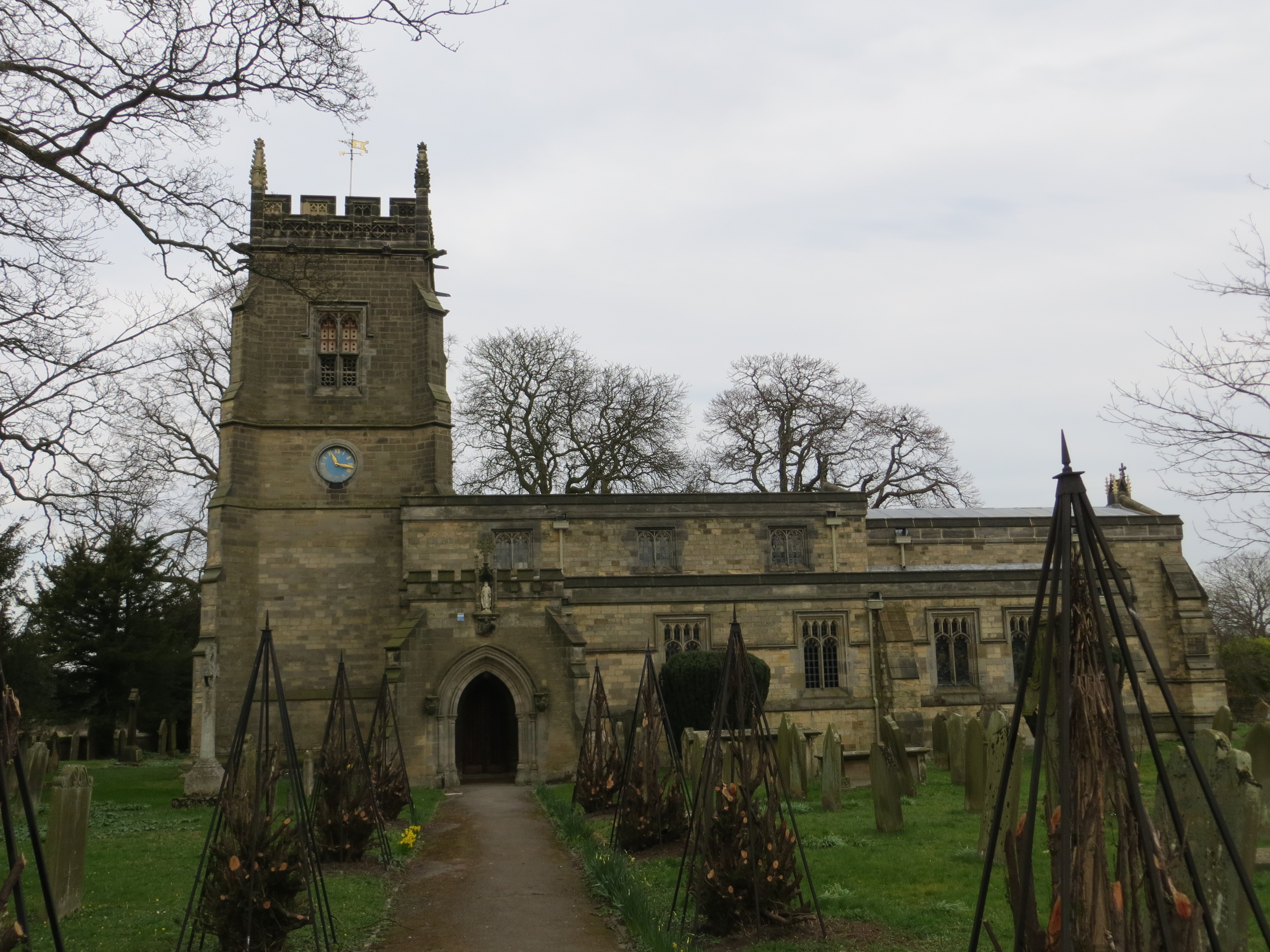
The church, in 2014

All Saints' Church is the parish church of Slingsby, North Yorkshire, a village in England.

A church was built in Slingsby at an early date. In 1848, it was described as "a neat structure, partly Norman, and partly in the later English style". Between 1867 and 1869, it was demolished and rebuilt, with funding from Edward Howard. The new building was designed by Robert James Johnson, who attempted to move away from typical Victorian restoration practices, and produced a design similar to those popular in the 1880s or 1890s. He reused much material from the old building, including a whole 13th-century arcade. The building was grade II* listed in 1954.

The church is built of sandstone, and consists of a nave with a clerestory, north and south aisles, a south porch, a chancel with a south chapel and a north organ chamber and vestry, and a west tower. The tower has three stages, stepped diagonal buttresses, the north incorporating a stair turret, and string courses. On the west front is a large window with a pointed arch, a clock face on the south of the middle stage and a small trefoil-headed window, two-light bell openings with square heads, and a decorated embattled parapet, with corner crocketed pinnacles, projecting animal sculptures and gargoyles. The tower has a clock, built in 1838, and three bells dating from 1803. Inside, there is a 13th-century effigy of a knight, a 17th-century oak bench, a large brass chandelier brought from St Mary's Church, Sledmere, 19th-century oak pews, and a tower screen dated 1928.

== See also ==
- Grade II* listed churches in North Yorkshire (district)
- Listed buildings in Slingsby, North Yorkshire
