= Sir Thomas Gower, 1st Baronet =

English nobleman, politician, and knight (1584–1651)

Sir Thomas Gower, 1st Baronet (1584–1651) was an English nobleman, politician, and knight. He was an early member of the Leveson-Gower family. He was knighted by James I and was created a baronet on 2 June 1620. In 1620 he was High Sheriff of Yorkshire.

== Family ==
Thomas was the eldest son and heir of Sir Thomas Gower (military engineer and at one time Marshal of Berwick and later governor of Aymouth Fort)/Eyemouth, and his wife Mary, daughter of Gabriel Fairfax, Esq. of Steeton in Yorkshire.

On 28 May 1604 Thomas married Anne Dayley, daughter and coheir to John Dayley, of Merton, Oxfordshire and by her (who died 28 October 1633, and was buried in the church of St Clement Danes in London) had issue Sir Thomas Gower, 2nd Baronet his successor, Doyley – a colonel of dragoons in the service of Charles I, and other sons.

== Notes ==
Baronetage of England
New creation	Baronet (of Stittenham); 1620–1651	Succeeded by Thomas Gower
