= Ralph Hastings (died 1346) =

13th-14th century English noble

Sir Ralph Hastings (died 1346), Lord of Allerston, was an English soldier and noble who fought in the Hundred Years' War.

Arms of Ralph Hastings: Argent, a maunch sable.

Ralph was the eldest son of Nicholas Hastings and Agnes. He succeeded his father, upon his father's death in 1316. Ralph was appointed constable of Pickering Castle in 1334. He served as Sheriff of Yorkshire in 1337 and 1340. Ralph acquired the manor of Slingsby in 1343. He was injured during the Battle of Neville's Cross in 1346 and sequently died of his wounds. Ralph was buried at Sulby Abbey, Northamptonshire.

== Marriage and issue ==
He married Helen, daughter of William de Herle, they are known to have had the following known issue:

- Ralph Hastings (died 1397), married firstly Isabella Saddington and secondly Maud de Sutton, he had issue with both wives.
