= Edward St John (died 1389) =

Alleged arms of Edward St John, as displayed on the tomb of Henry Clifford, 1st Earl of Cumberland.

Sir Edward St John (died 7 March 1389), of Londesborough and Weaverthorpe, Yorkshire was an English landowner.

St John was a younger son of Edward St John of Litchfield and Sherborne and Eve Dawtrey. In 1361, Edward granted his estate in Chirton, Wiltshire, to his brother Richard and his wife Margaret, in tail.

Edward married Anastasia, daughter and co-heiress of William Aton and Isabel Percy, they had a daughter Margaret who married Sir Thomas Bromflete. St John held in the name of his wife Anastasia, her lands of Brompton.
