= Sir Thomas Gower, 2nd Baronet =

English nobleman, politician, and knight

Sir Thomas Gower, 2nd Baronet (c. 1605–1672) was an English nobleman, politician, and knight. He was a member of the Leveson-Gower family. He twice served as High Sheriff of Yorkshire and supported the Royalist cause during the English Civil War.

== Biography ==
Gower was knighted at Whitehall on 24 June 1630, and succeeded his father, Sir Thomas Gower, 1st Baronet, in his estate, and title of Baronet. He was a sufferer for his loyalty to Charles I, having been twice High Sheriff of Yorkshire (1641 and 1662), and attended on the King when he was shut out of Hull. He raised a regiment of dragoons at his own expense, of which his younger brother, Doyley was colonel. After the Restoration he served in Parliament as Member for Malton from 1661 until his death in 1672.

== Family ==
Gower had two wives, first, Elizabeth Howard, daughter of Sir William Howard of Naworth Castle, sister to Charles Earl of Carlisle, and second, Frances Leveson, daughter and coheir of Sir John Leveson, of Halling in Kent, and of Lilleshall in Shropshire, by Frances his wife, daughter and heiress of Sir Thomas Sondes, of Throwley in Kent, (elder brother of Sir Michael Sondes, who was grandfather to George Sondes, 1st Earl of Feversham) by Margaret, sister of Henry Brooke, 11th Baron Cobham. By which last Lady, this Sir Thomas Gower had two sons, Edward, and Sir William Leveson-Gower, 4th Baronet, ancestor to George Granville Leveson-Gower, 2nd Marquess of Stafford. His daughter Frances Gower married John Dixon, of Leeds and Gledhow Hall.

== Notes ==
Baronetage of England
Preceded by Thomas Gower	Baronet (of Stittenham); 1651–1672	Succeeded by Thomas Gower
