= Slingsby, North Yorkshire =

Village and civil parish in North Yorkshire, England

Coordinates: 54°09′54″N 0°55′55″W

Slingsby
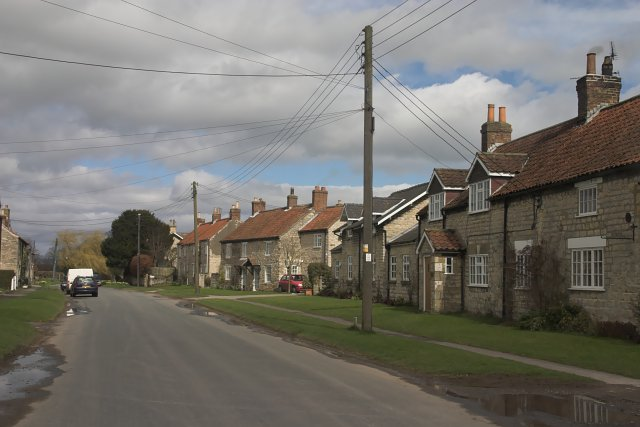
- Cottages in Slingsby

- Location within North Yorkshire
- Population: 665 (2011 census)
- OS grid reference: SE697745
  - London: 185 mi (298 km) S
- Civil parish: Slingsby
- Unitary authority: North Yorkshire
- Ceremonial county: North Yorkshire
- Region: Yorkshire and the Humber
- Country: England
- Sovereign state: United Kingdom
- Post town: MALTON
- Postcode district: YO62
- Police: North Yorkshire
- Fire: North Yorkshire
- Ambulance: Yorkshire
- UK Parliament: Thirsk and Malton

Slingsby is a village and civil parish in North Yorkshire, England, 6 miles (10 km) west of Malton on the B1257 road. At the 2001 Census, it had a population of 634, increasing to 665 at the 2011 Census.

== History ==
The village is mentioned in the Domesday Book as "Selungesbi" in the "Maneshou hundred". It was part of the Hovingham manor, but some land was owned by Orm, son of Gamul at the time of the Norman invasion. Afterwards land around the manor were split between Hugh, son of Baldric and Count Robert of Mortain. The manor passed to the Mowbray family until 1322, when John de Mowbray was beheaded for rising against the Crown. The Wyville family held land under the Mowbrays. The Hastings family held the manor until 1595 when it was purchased by Sir Charles Cavendish (d. 1617). He planned to build a new mansion, employing the architect Robert Smythson, but this building was not started. His son, also called Sir Charles Cavendish, built a house in the 1620s.

The Cavendish family held Slingsby for the next hundred years until they sold up to the Duke of Buckingham. In 1751 the manor was sold to the fourth Earl of Carlisle, whose family hold the title to this day. The Mowbrays built Slingsby Castle in the village, but this had fallen into disrepair by the time the Hastings built another in 1345. This was removed by the Cavendishes and rebuilt where the remains can still be seen today just off the High Street. They are a Grade II Listed Building.

The village used to have a railway station on the Thirsk & Malton Line. The station opened in June 1853 and closed to passengers in 1931 and freight in 1964.

== Governance ==
The village lies within the Thirsk and Malton parliamentary constituency. It is within the Amotherby and Ampleforth electoral division of North Yorkshire Council.

From 1974 to 2023 the village was part of Ryedale district.

Slingsby Parish covers the hamlets of Fryton and South Holme. The Parish Council reflects this in its membership with five councillors representing Slingsby and one each representing the other two hamlets.

== Geography ==
The village lies west of Malton on the B1257 road to Hovingham, Helmsley and the North York Moors. The stretch of road from Malton to Hovingham, part of an old Roman road, is known locally as the Street with some of the neighbouring villages to the east having Street suffixed, such as Barton-le-Street and Appleton-le-Street.

The nearest settlements are the hamlets of Fryton 0.7 miles (1.1 km) to the west and South Holme 1.5 miles (2.4 km) to the north. The street village of Barton-le-Street is 1.5 miles to the east. Wath Beck runs north east around the edge of the village on its way to join the nearby River Rye.

Slingsby lies at the foot of the gently sloping land which forms the northern edge of the Howardian Hills (an Area of Outstanding Natural Beauty), with the Vale of Pickering spreading out to its north and east.

== Demography ==
In 1881 the UK Census recorded the population of 596. In the 2001 UK Census, the population was recorded as 634 across 283 households. Of that population, 48.7% were male and 51.3% were female with 532 being over the age of sixteen years. There were 291 dwellings, of which 104 were detached properties.

== Amenities ==
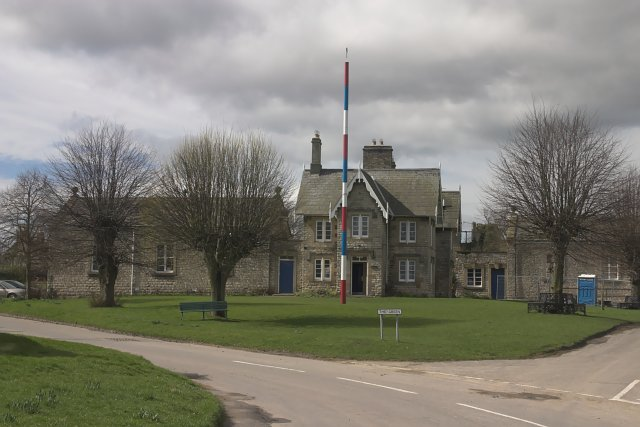
Slingsby – The Green with Maypole in front of School

A school was built on The Green in 1860 and is still in use. It is a Grade II listed building. In front of the building is a traditional Maypole. The primary school is within the catchment area for Malton School for secondary education.

The village has numerous small to medium size businesses. There are two camping sites, one near the old railway line and the other on Green Dike Lane. The Grapes public house lies in the village. The village is served by the bus route between Malton and Helmsley.

There is a sports club in the village that provides for football, tennis, bowling and cricket. Slingsby Football Club competes in the Beckett League.

== Religion ==
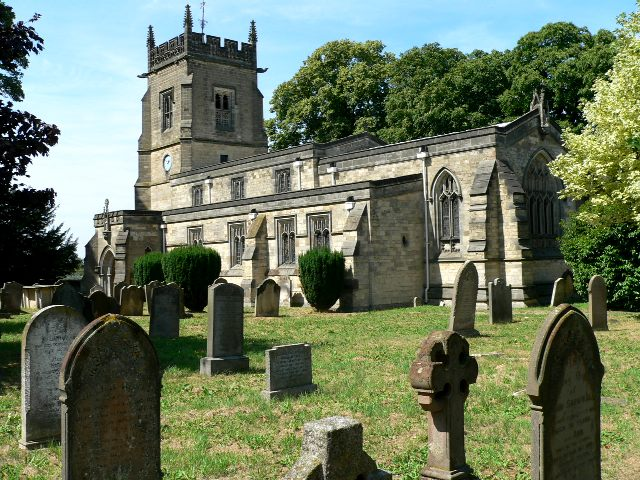
The Parish Church, Slingsby

All Saints' Church, Slingsby, lies at the western side of the village. The present church was built in the late 1860s in the style of its predecessor on the same site, which was demolished. It is mainly 15th-century in style with Victorian modifications, and is a Grade II listed building. With neighbouring parishes, Slingsby's Anglican church belongs to the Benefice of the Street Parishes, which is part of the Diocese of York.

The Methodist Chapel was built in 1837, John Wesley having preached in Slingsby in 1757, on a site adjacent to the village green and is a Grade II listed building.

== Notable people ==
- Charles Hardwick (1821–1859) – clergyman and Archdeacon of Ely was born in the village.
- John Close – Lord Mayor of York (1884–5, 1891–2 & 1892–93) and childhood friend of Charles Hardwick.
- Captain Robert Ward (Royal Navy) – Midshipman on Admiral Nelson's flagship at Trafalgar was born in the village. Memorial Cross to him can be found in the Churchyard.

== See also ==
- Listed buildings in Slingsby, North Yorkshire
