= Henry Savile (died 1558) =

English politician

Sir Henry Savile (1498/99 – 20 April 1558), of Thornhill, Tankersley, and Elland, Yorkshire, was an English politician.

He was the eldest and only son of Sir John Savile of Thornhill Hall and Tankersley. He succeeded his father in 1505 and was knighted in 1533.

== Career ==
He was a justice of the peace (J.P.) for the West Riding of Yorkshire from 1528 to his death, except for a period from 1530 to 1534 when he was removed from the bench. He was appointed High Sheriff of Yorkshire for 1537–38 and 1541–42.

He was a member of parliament (MP) for Yorkshire in 1539. He was appointed captain of Pontefract Castle in 1539 and Barnborough Castle, Yorkshire in 1546 and served as member of the Council of the North from 1542 to 1549 and 1552 to his death.

== Personal life ==
He married Elizabeth, the daughter and heiress of Thomas Soothill of Soothill, Yorkshire, with whom he had 2 sons and a daughter. His heir Edward was later found to be mentally unbalanced.
