= James Anson Farrer =

English barrister and writer

James Anson Farrer

James Anson Farrer (24 July 1849 – 21 June 1925), best known as James A. Farrer was an English barrister and writer.

== Biography ==
Farrer was born in London, his parents were Rev. Matthew Thomas Farrer and Mary Louisa Anson. He was educated at Balliol College, Oxford and worked as a barrister. He lived in Ingleborough and married Elizabeth Georgiana Anne in 1877.

He also worked as a JP in Westmorland.

== Publications ==
- Primitive Manners and Customs (1879)
- Zululand and the Zulus (1879)
- Crimes and Punishments (1880) – translation of Cesare Beccaria's Dei delitti e delle pene along with introductory chapters
- Military Manners and Customs (1885)
- Paganism and Christianity (1891)
- Books Condemned to be Burnt (1892)
- Literary Forgeries (1907) [with an introduction by Andrew Lang]
- The Monarchy in Politics (1917)
- The War for Monarchy, 1793-1815 (1920)
- England Under Edward VII (1922)

== See also ==
- High Sheriff of Yorkshire
