= Joan Holland =

Third daughter of Thomas Holland

- Duchess of York; Lady Willoughby de Eresby; Lady Scrope of Masham
- Born: ca. 1380; Upholland, Lancashire, England
- Died: 12 April 1434 (aged 53–54)
- Spouse: Edmund of Langley, 1st Duke of York (m. 1393; died 1402) William Willoughby, 5th Baron Willoughby de Eresby (m. 1404; died 1409) Henry Scrope, 3rd Baron Scrope of Masham (m. 1410; died 1415) Sir Henry Bromflete (m. 1416)
- Father: Thomas Holland, 2nd Earl of Kent
- Mother: Alice FitzAlan

Joan Holland (ca. 1380–12 April 1434) was the third daughter of Thomas Holland, 2nd Earl of Kent, and Alice FitzAlan. She married four times. Her first husband was a duke, and the following three were barons. All of her marriages were most likely childless.

== Family ==
Joan Holland was born around 1380 in Upholland, Lancashire, England, as one of the ten children of Thomas Holland, 2nd Earl of Kent and Alice FitzAlan, sister of Richard Fitzalan, 11th Earl of Arundel. She was niece of Richard II of England, son of her paternal grandmother, Joan of Kent by her second marriage to Edward the Black Prince. Joan had five sisters: Alianore became Countess of March; Margaret became Countess of Somerset and later Duchess of Clarence; Eleanor became Countess of Salisbury; Elizabeth married Sir John Neville; and Bridget became a nun at Barking Abbey. Her eldest brother, Thomas Holland, 1st Duke of Surrey, was beheaded in 1400 by a mob of angry citizens at Cirencester for his role in the Epiphany Rising, which was aimed against the life of King Henry IV of England, who had usurped the throne of King Richard. Thomas's heir to the earldom of Kent was her second eldest brother Edmund Holland.

== Life ==
Joan married Edmund of Langley, 1st Duke of York, son of Edward III of England and Philippa of Hainault, ca. 4 November 1393. As a result of this marriage, she was styled Duchess of York. Joan was 35 or 40 years younger than her husband and around the same age of her stepdaughter Constance of York. The marriage produced no children.

In 1399, Joan and her sister Margaret were invested as ”Lady Companions of the Garter”. They were granddaughters of Joan, the "Fair Maid of Kent" who inspired Edward III's founding of the Order of the Garter, according to popular legend.

After Langley's death in 1402, Joan married (before 9 August 1404) William de Willoughby, 5th Lord Willoughby de Eresby (c. 1370–1409), a Knight of the Garter, son of Robert de Willoughby, 4th Lord Willoughby de Eresby, and Alice Skipwith. Upon her marriage, she became The Baroness Willoughby de Eresby, or Lady Willoughby. Lord Willoughby died on 30 November 1409. The marriage produced no children.

Her third marriage (after 6 September 1410) was by licence to Henry le Scrope, 3rd Baron Scrope of Masham. That year, Scrope was made a Knight of the Garter. He served Henry IV as treasurer, and was executed in 1415 following the failure of his plot with the Earl of Cambridge (Joan's former stepson, being the son of her first husband, and nephew by marriage, being the husband of Anne de Mortimer, her sister's daughter) to assassinate Henry V and place Edmund Mortimer, 5th Earl of March (Joan's nephew) on the throne. Lord Scrope and Cambridge were both beheaded on 5 August 1415 at Southampton Green, Hampshire, England. Cambridge's then four-year-old son, Richard Plantagenet, ultimately championed his father's cause, which evolved into the Wars of the Roses and the Yorkist claimants achieving the throne.

Less than a year later, before 27 April 1416, Joan married her fourth and final husband, Sir Henry Bromflete, son of Sir Thomas Bromflete and his wife Margaret St John.

== Death ==
She died on 12 April 1434. Her last husband was summoned to Parliament as Baron Vessy on 24 January 1449 and died on 16 January 1469.
