= Clifton-on-Yore =

Civil parish in North Yorkshire, England

Coordinates: 54.254°N 1.667°W

- Civil parish
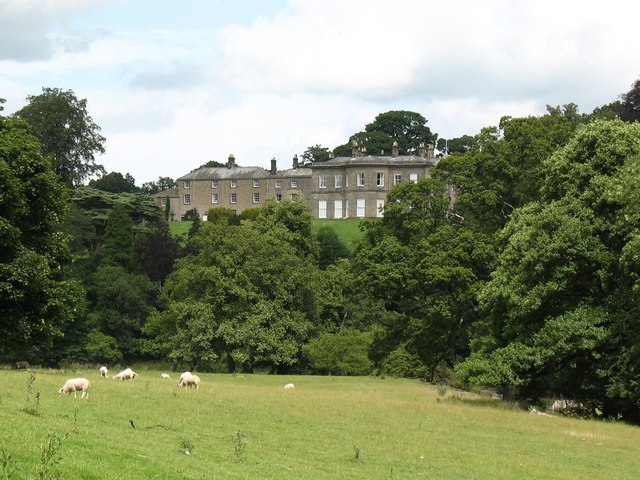
- Clifton Castle

- Location within North Yorkshire
- Population: 40
- OS grid reference: SE216845
- Civil parish: Clifton-on-Yore
- Unitary authority: North Yorkshire
- Ceremonial county: North Yorkshire
- Region: Yorkshire and the Humber
- Country: England
- Sovereign state: United Kingdom
- Post town: RIPON
- Postcode district: HG4
- Police: North Yorkshire
- Fire: North Yorkshire
- Ambulance: Yorkshire

Clifton-on-Yore is a civil parish in the county of North Yorkshire, England. The population of the parish was estimated at 40 in 2010. The population remained less than 100 as taken at the 2011 Census. Details were included in the civil parish of Thirn.

There is no village in the parish, but there are a few houses, the most notable of which is Clifton Castle, incorporating some remains of a 14th-century castle.

From 1974 to 2023 it was part of the Hambleton District, it is now administered by the unitary North Yorkshire Council.

== See also ==
- Listed buildings in Clifton-on-Yore
