= Chevet, West Yorkshire =

Civil parish in West Yorkshire, England

Coordinates: 53.633°N 1.474°W

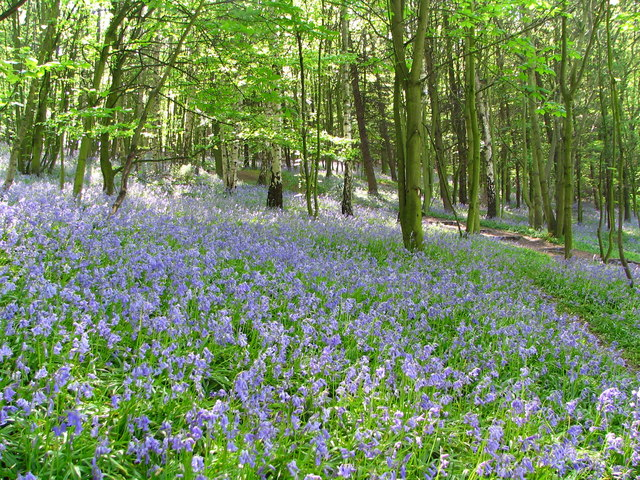
Newmiller Dam Country Park in Chevet

Chevet is a civil parish in the City of Wakefield in West Yorkshire, England. It has a population in 2001 of 66. In the 2011 Census this civil parish was included in the ward of Wakefield South.

Chevet Hall was a country house which stood in an estate, part of which is now Newmillerdam Country Park. The house was built in 1529 by the Nevile family and was bought in 1765 by Sir Lionel Pilkington, 5th Baronet and passed down through the Pilkington family. In 1954 the estate was acquired as a country park by Wakefield Council, who demolished the hall in the 1960s.

== See also ==
- Listed buildings in Chevet, West Yorkshire
