= Church of Saint Oswald, King and Martyr, Oswaldkirk =

Coordinates: 54°12′8″N 1°02′59″W

St Oswald's Church, Oswaldkirk
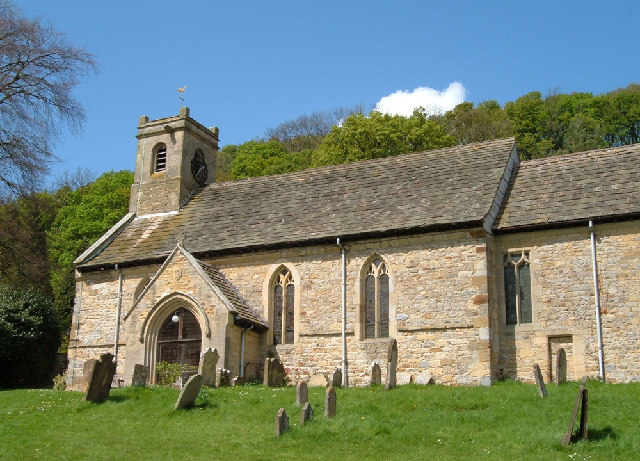
- The church, viewed from the south

- Location in North Yorkshire
- OS grid reference: SE 620 789
- Location: Oswaldkirk, North Yorkshire
- Country: England
- Denomination: Church of England
- Previous denomination: Roman Catholic

History
- Status: Parish church
- Founded: 11th century
- Dedication: Saint Oswald

Architecture
- Functional status: Active
- Heritage designation: Grade II*
- Designated: 4 January 1955
- Architectural type: Church

Administration
- Province: Province of York
- Diocese: Diocese of York
- Archdeaconry: Cleveland
- Deanery: Northern Ryedale
- Parish: Oswaldkirk

Clergy
- Vicar: The Reverend James Trowsdale

The Church of Saint Oswald, King and Martyr is an Anglican church serving the village and parish of Oswaldkirk, North Yorkshire, England. It is located along the main road passing through the village (Oswaldkirk Main Street), 1.5 miles (2.4 km) east of Ampleforth Abbey.

Dedicated to the Christian saint Saint Oswald, it is over 900 years old and administered by the Church of England. It is part of a four-parish benefice, the Benefice of Ampleforth with Oswaldkirk, Gilling East and Stonegrave, in the archdeaconry of Cleveland, and the diocese of York. The church has been a Grade II* listed building since 1955, and is the oldest building in the village by more than six centuries.

== Etymology ==
The word "kirk" means church, so the village is literally called "Oswald's church", after the church, which is dedicated to Saint Oswald of Northumbria, a Christian king who spread Christianity throughout Northumbria in the 7th century AD.

== History and architecture ==
Almost nothing of the original church—built on the site of a wooden Saxon church—remains, apart from unique examples of Celtic stonework, including a plait interweave and a bas-relief of the Virgin and Child, which was carved around 1000 AD. The current building still has a quoin, which was probably a re-cycled Anglo-Saxon cross shaft. The stone southern entrance to the church still stands; it was built in the 12th century and is a typical example of Norman stonework. The church was re-consecrated in 1287 by the bishop of Candida Casa under the direction of John le Romeyn, Archbishop of York. The tall windows set in the church wall both north and south of the nave can be dated to approximately 1320 to 1330, and in the top sections of two of the windows, small fragments of medieval glass can be found. A sideways orientated tombstone can be found under a low arch on the inside of the southern wall, generally believed to be that of Sir Richard Pickering (d. 1441), a member of the Pickering family who ruled the village of Oswaldkirk from the 14th century into the 16th century.

The church records include an unbroken list of rectors dating back to 1302, during the reign of King Edward I. One notable rector was John Dee, who served from early 1568 until the year 1574, although he was probably never a permanent resident. Dee, a noted mathematician, astrologer, alchemist and astronomer, was on friendly terms with the ruling monarch, Queen Elizabeth I, and had given her astrological advice for setting the date of her coronation.

The future Archbishop of Canterbury and chaplain to King Charles II, John Tillotson, preached his first sermon at the church of Saint Oswald in 1661, because of his friendship with John Denton, who was rector of the church from 1658 until his expulsion in 1662 for non-conformism.

Perhaps the most important event in the 17th century was the installation of two brand new bells, one bearing the inscription "Venite Exultemus Domino", or "Come, let us rejoice in the Lord" (dated 1684), and the other bearing the inscription "Gloria in Altissimus Deo", or "Glory to God in the highest" (dated 1683). These are still in use through bell-ropes, which have been replaced several times in the intervening centuries and extend down to the floor next to the clock mechanism, which is dated 1898 and is wholly mechanical, powering a clock whose two faces can be seen on both the western and eastern sides of the bell tower.

There was major restoration work done to the church in 1886, and a large amount of the Chancel woodwork dates from this period. During the restoration the east window was also replaced; it now depicts the stylised form of Saint Oswald, flanked on either side by Saint Aidan, and Saint Cuthbert, both Christian saints of the same era, and who helped him in missionary work in the Kingdom of Northumbria. These windows are directly opposite the western window, above the font at the other end of the church, which depicts the queen at the time, Queen Victoria. Further modern additions to the church can be seen in the bell turret and organ chamber, as well as the south porch, which is currently the sole congregational entrance to the church. The church uses an electric organ during services. The church is a Grade II* listed building and has been so since 4 January 1955.

== Modern usage ==
St Oswald's is part of a four-church benefice, including the churches and parishes of Oswaldkirk, Ampleforth, Gilling, and Stonegrave. As of 2022 the vicar is the Reverend James Trowsdale, who serves all four parishes. Services in the church occur weekly on Sunday and at other times during the week with the help of volunteers in the local community. The church is host to a carol service each year on Christmas Eve, jointly undertaken by the Anglican and Roman Catholic congregations. The united churches of Oswaldkirk also have a harvest festival each year.

== See also ==
- Grade II* listed churches in North Yorkshire (district)
- Listed buildings in Oswaldkirk

== Gallery ==
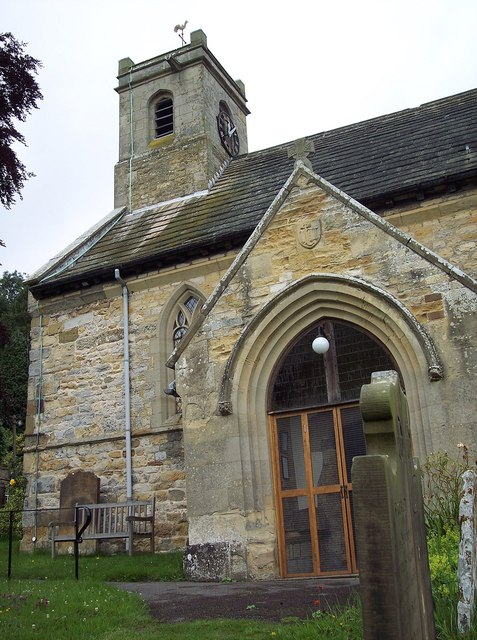
Porch

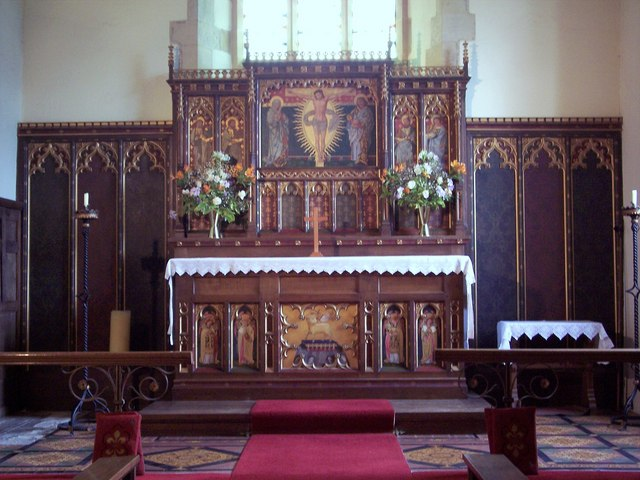
Interior

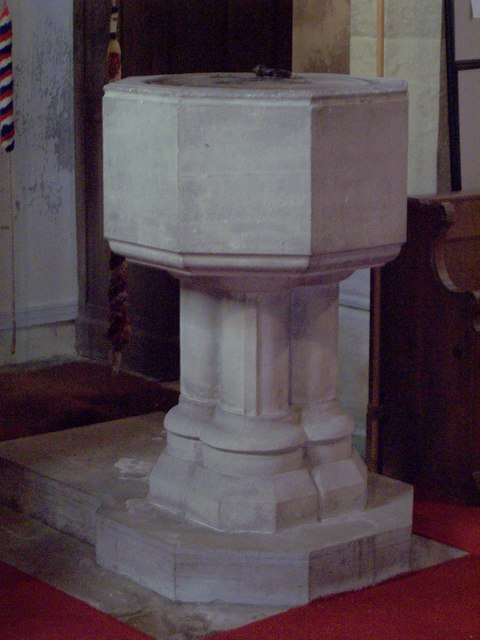
Font

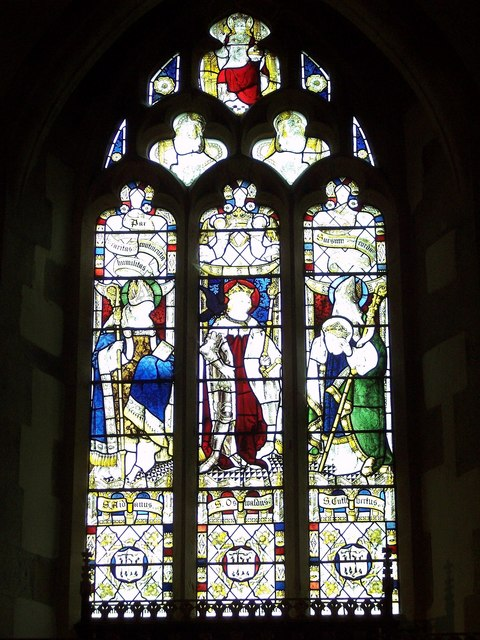
Stained glass window
