= Thomas Fairfax (disambiguation) =

Thomas Fairfax, 3rd Lord Fairfax of Cameron (1612–1671) was a general and Parliamentary commander-in-chief during the English Civil War.

Thomas Fairfax may also refer to:

- Thomas Fairfax (d. 1505) (Walton), father of Thomas Fairfax (Gilling)
- Thomas Fairfax (d. 1520) (Gilling), owner of Gilling Castle
- Thomas Fairfax, 1st Lord Fairfax of Cameron (1560–1640), English soldier, diplomat and politician
- Thomas Fairfax, 1st Viscount Fairfax (1575–1636), English landowner and politician
- Thomas Fairfax (Jesuit) (1656–1716), English Jesuit
- Thomas Fairfax, 5th Lord Fairfax of Cameron (1657–1710), English politician
- Thomas Fairfax, 6th Lord Fairfax of Cameron (1693–1781), Scottish peer
- Thomas Fairfax, 9th Lord Fairfax of Cameron (1762–1846), American-born Scottish peer
- Thomas Fairfax, 13th Lord Fairfax of Cameron (1923–1964), Scottish peer and Conservative politician
- Thomas Fairfax (priest) (died 1641), Anglican archdeacon in Ireland
