= Holy Cross Church, Gilling =

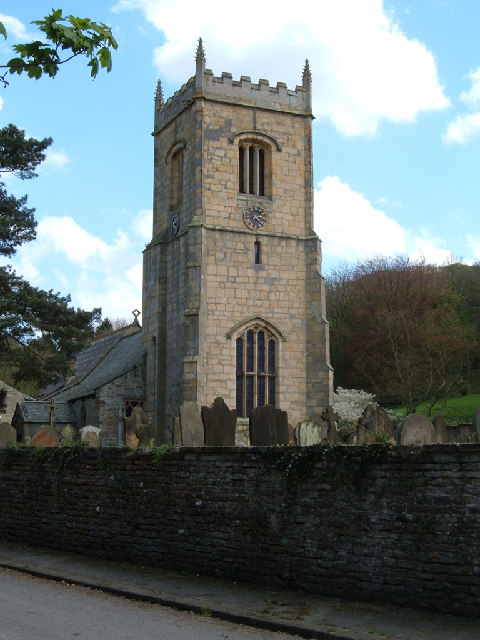
- The Church from the east

- Location in North Yorkshire
- 54.184202°N 1.057901°W
- OS grid reference: SE 615 769
- Location: Gilling East, North Yorkshire
- Country: England
- Denomination: Church of England

History
- Status: Parish church
- Founded: 11th century
- Dedication: Holy Cross

Architecture
- Functional status: Active
- Architectural type: Church

Administration
- Province: Province of York
- Diocese: Diocese of York
- Archdeaconry: Cleveland
- Deanery: Northern Ryedale
- Parish: Gilling

Clergy
- Vicar: Revd. James Trowsdale

Holy Cross Church is a parish church which serves the village and parish of Gilling East in North Yorkshire, England. The parish contains the villages of Gilling, Cawton, and Grimston. The church is dedicated to the Holy Cross, although it has been referred to as either the church of Saint Mary or the church of Saint Helena (the queen who by legend discovered the true cross) in the past. It is part of a four-church benefice which includes Gilling, Oswaldkirk, Stonegrave, and Ampleforth under a single vicar, Rev James Trowsdale. The church was designated as a Grade I listed building on 4 January 1955.

== History ==
The arcade dates from around the year 1200. The chancel was added early in the 14th century, and the southern arcade was added slightly later. The tower was a later addition, dating from the late 15th century. There are currently three bells in the tower, which are inscribed with the years of their installation, 1664, 1701 and 1773 AD. They, and the clock which faces east halfway up the tower, are accessible by means of a spiral staircase which leads up the centre of the tower. At the western end of the church, there is the tomb of Sir Thomas Fairfax, a local landlord, who died in 1828. There was some restoration during the Victorian era, which included the addition of the current organ chamber, which was installed in 1883. The east window, with reticulated tracery, was also installed in the 19th century. The current clock was installed in 1908: Prince Ranjitsinhji, who often played cricket in the village, raised money for the clock through organising cricket matches.

== Gallery ==
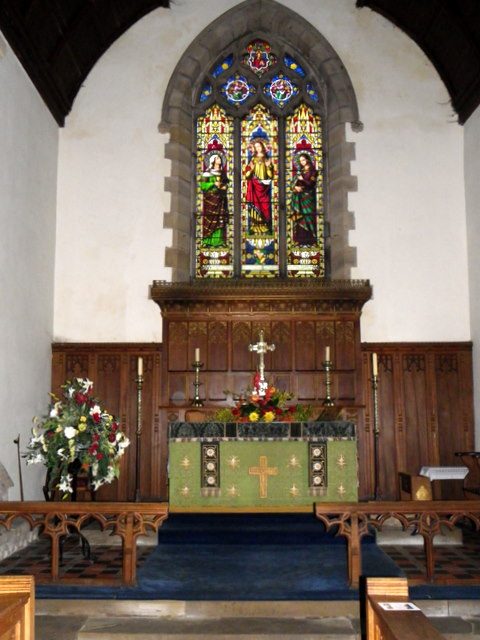
Chancel

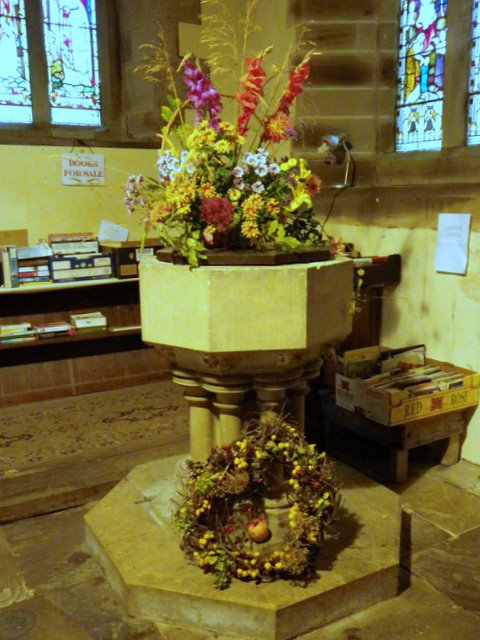
Font
