= St Martin's Ampleforth =

Location
- Gilling East, North Yorkshire, YO62 4HP; England; 54.183273°N 1.064923°W

Information
- Type: Private preparatory day and boarding school
- Religious affiliation: Roman Catholic (Benedictine)
- Established: 1930
- Closed: July 2020
- Local authority: North Yorkshire
- Department for Education URN: 121751 Tables
- Headmaster: David Moses
- Gender: Coeducational
- Age: 3 to 13
- Enrolment: 175~
- Affiliated School: Ampleforth College
- Diocese: Middlesbrough
- Website: http://www.stmartins.ampleforth.org.uk/

St Martin's Ampleforth (SMA) was a private school and the preparatory school for Ampleforth College, which closed in July 2020. Until 2018 it was at Gilling Castle, North Yorkshire, England, on the southern side of a valley opposite the College on the northern side, in the Roman Catholic Diocese of Middlesbrough.

== History ==
=== Buildings ===
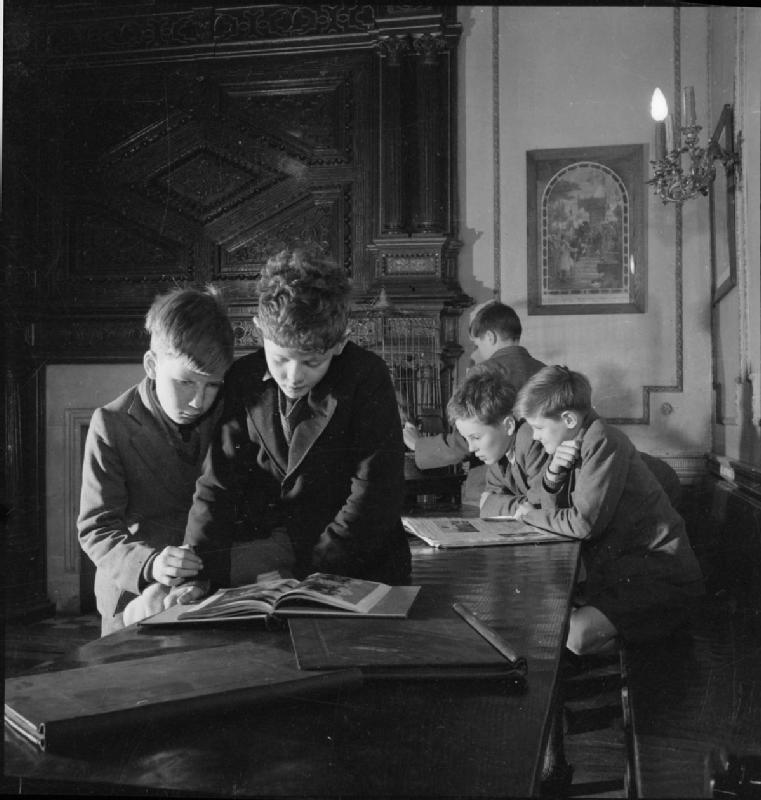
Boys in Gilling Castle in 1943

Gilling Castle dates back to the Medieval era and was originally home to the Etton family. It was Thomas de Etton who built, in the second half of the 14th century, the fortified manor house, a large tower almost square, whose basement still forms the core of the present building. It was later owned by Thomas Fairfax and changed hands a number of times before the Benedictine monks at Ampleforth Abbey bought the property in 1929. The buildings were refurbished over the years to accommodate growing pupil numbers. A playground for the nursery and pre-prep department was added in 2004. In January 2018 a proposal was made to close the site, with the remaining pupils moved to a new junior house at the main Ampleforth College.

=== School ===
The monks obtained ownership of the castle and founded a preparatory school there in 1930. Until 1992, it was known as Gilling Castle Preparatory School before merging with Ampleforth College's junior section to become Ampleforth College Junior School. In 2001 the Junior School merged with St Martin's, a prep school at Nawton, and became known by its current name. The College has since moved its junior department to St Martin's and is solely a senior school.

Although St Martin's served as the College's main feeder school it was independently managed; the College's governing body was chaired by the abbot of Ampleforth Abbey while St Martin's was managed as a charity trust and chaired by a lay member.

By 2022, the castle had been vacant for four years; it was listed for sale by the Ampleforth Abbey trustees.

== Academic ==
St Martin's prepared pupils for the Common Entrance Exam, which is taken in Year 8. Many gained scholarships to independent schools.

== Boarding ==
The boarding programme was open to both boys and, since 2001, girls. They could have chosen between full or flexi-boarding. Senior boys resided in Castle House and junior boys and girls resided in separate sections of Foal Yard. Boarders were cared for by a team of house parents, resident teachers and boarding assistants.

== Extracurricular activities ==
Rugby and cricket were the main team sports for the boys with netball and rounders for the girls. Hockey was available to both boys and girls. St Martin's had a good track record in inter-school sports competitions, especially in cross country and athletics. Noted for its fine Music Department, its choirs not only sang regularly at Ampleforth College, but also appeared on Radio and Television.

== Criticism ==
In November 2017 the independent inquiry into child sexual abuse heard that priests abused six-year-old boys, which included beatings and sex abuse. A witness who was at the prep school and college for 11 years during the 1960s and 1970s complained about being "physically and psychologically abused" by a priest who was "nasty, cruel and physically violent towards me". After the witness had finished schooling, he experienced a "total psychological collapse" lasting seven to eight years. "I wasn't able to do anything, I couldn't function," he said. The witness said in his opinion Cardinal Basil Hume, abbot of Ampleforth Abbey for 13 years, had known about abuse at the schools. "I have no doubt he knew exactly what was going on at the time," he said. Three monks and two lay teachers were convicted of sex crimes against over 30 pupils between the 1960s and 2010, including Father Piers Grant-Ferris, the son of a Tory peer, who in 2005 admitted to 20 incidents of child abuse. The Yorkshire Post reported in the same year that "Pupils ... suffered decades of abuse from at least six paedophiles following a decision by former Abbot Basil Hume not to call in police at the beginning of the scandal."
