= Malt shovel =

A malt shovel is a shovel used during malting, part of the brewing process.

Malt shovel could also refer to:

- Malt Shovel Brewery, in Australia
- Malt Shovel, Spondon, a public house in Derby
- Malt Shovel (sculpture), a public art installation in Burton upon Trent
- The Malt Shovel, a pub in Oswaldkirk, in England
