= William Fairfax (died 1597) =

English politician

Sir William Fairfax (c. 1531– 1 November 1597) JP, of Gilling Castle and Walton, Yorkshire, was an English politician.

He was the eldest son of Sir Nicholas Fairfax of Gilling, whom he succeeded in 1571. He was knighted in 1560 and was a justice of the peace for Yorkshire from 1562 until his death.

He was a member (MP) of the Parliament of England for Boroughbridge in 1558 and for Yorkshire in 1597. He was High Sheriff of Yorkshire for 1577–78 and a member of the Council in the North from 1577 until his death. When the Spanish Armada threatened invasion in 1588, he was captain of the Bulmer and Ryedale companies of the North York Trained Bands.

He died in 1597 shortly after his election to Parliament. He had married twice: first to Agnes, who was the daughter of George Lord Darcy; and second Jane, who was the daughter and heiress of Brian Stapleton of Burton Joyce, Nottinghamshire. He had one son, Thomas, who was made Viscount Fairfax in 1629.
