= St Aidan's Church, Oswaldkirk =

Church in Oswaldkirk, North Yorkshire, England

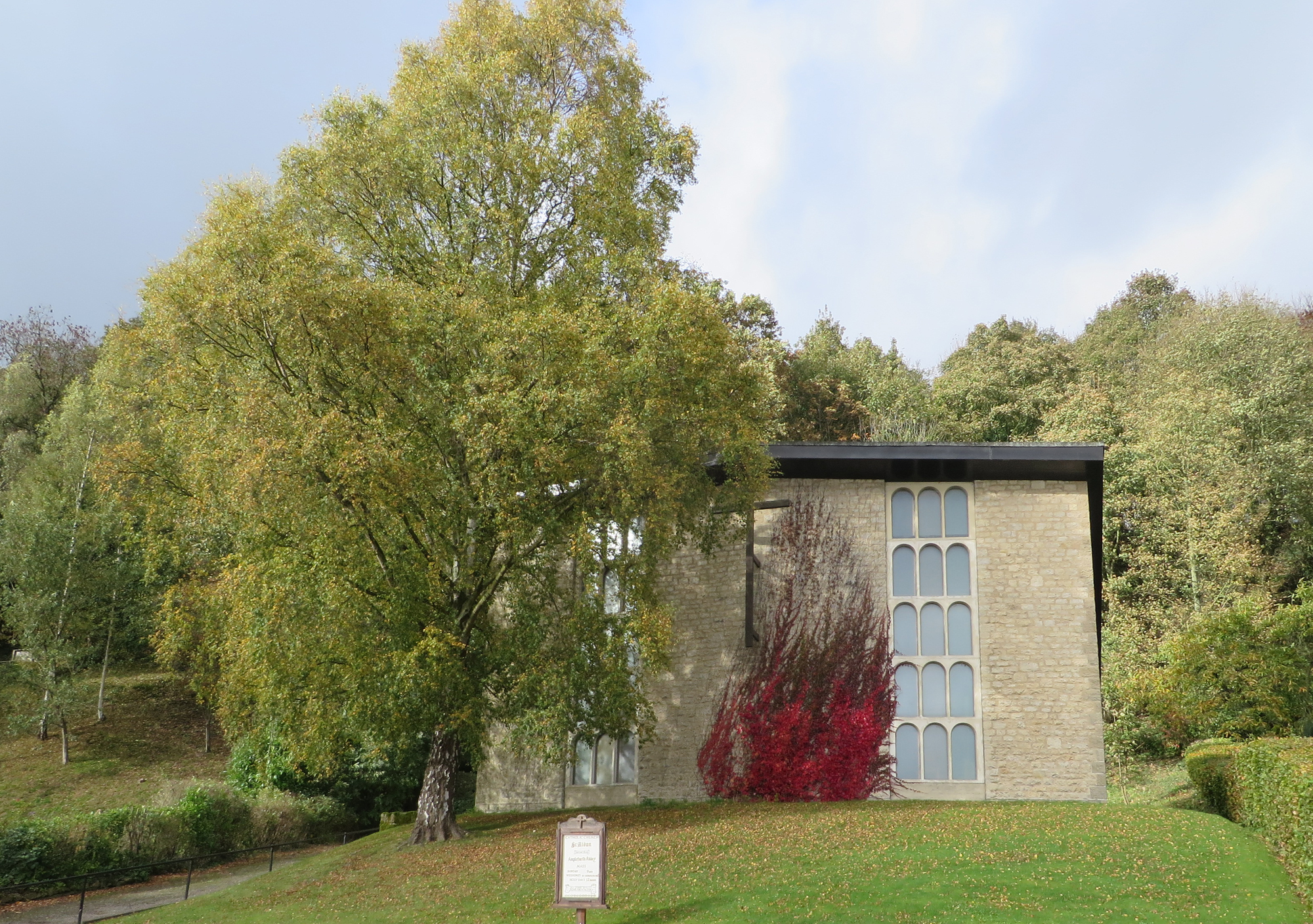
The church, in 2013

St Aidan's Church is a closed Catholic church in Oswaldkirk, a village in North Yorkshire, in England.

In the mid-20th century, Catholics in Oswaldkirk worshipped in the village hall, or in private houses. In 1963, a church was constructed, at a cost of £11,270, to a design by Ewan Blackledge. It served as a chapel of ease of Our Lady and St Benedict's Church, Ampleforth. In 1964, Peter Walker began working in the village as a police officer, and he was inspired by the new church to name the fictional village in his Constable series of books as "Aidensfield". The series was later adapted for television as Heartbeat. The church closed in September 2021.

The church is built of stone, and has a monopitch roof of steel covered in plywood and felt. It has a canted front, with tiered triple arch windows, and a timber cross in the centre. The windows originally had coloured glass by Derek Clarke, although they lacked expansion joints and so gradually cracked, one later being moved inside and framed. The entrance is on the west side, leading to a small vestibule and then a large hall, with brick-faced walls. Inside, there is a timber frieze of the Stations of the Cross, designed by John Bunting in 1969, and pews brought from Ampleforth Abbey church.
