= Nicholas Fairfax =

Nicholas Fairfax may refer to:

- Nicholas Fairfax (d. 1571) (c. 1498 – 1571), of Gilling Castle and Walton, Yorkshire, an English politician
- Nicholas Fairfax, 14th Lord Fairfax of Cameron (born 4 January 1956), a British peer and Conservative politician
