= Thomas Fairfax (d. 1520) =

English knight and owner of Gilling Castle

Sir Thomas Fairfax (c. 1475 – 1520) was an owner of Gilling Castle, near Gilling East, North Riding of Yorkshire, England.

== Sir Thomas Fairfax (father) ==
Fairfax's father Thomas Fairfax (d. 1505) successfully claimed the ownership of the Gilling Estate during two inquisitions, the first of which was in 1489. Thomas Fairfax (d. 1505) married Elizabeth, who was the daughter of Robert Sherburne of Lancashire, by whom he had nine children, the eldest of whom was Thomas Fairfax (d. 1520). Their other children were Richard, Robert, John, Jane, Elizabeth, Isabel, Anne, and Dorothy.

== Career ==
In 1513, Thomas Fairfax (d. 1520) served with Henry VIII's Artois expedition, during which he was knighted after Tournai (now in Belgium) surrendered to Henry. On his father's death in 1505, he inherited the Gilling estate.

== Marriage and family ==
Thomas Fairfax (d. 1520)'s wife was Agnes (or Anne) Gascoigne, who was the daughter of Lady Margaret Percy and the granddaughter Henry Percy, 3rd Earl of Northumberland, through whom she was a 2nd-great grandson of Edward III. Agnes third cousin was Margaret Tudor, who was the wife of James IV and the daughter of Elizabeth of York and Henry VII of England.

Agnes's father was Sir William Gascoigne The Younger of York, who descended from the famous judge Sir William Gascoigne. Fairfax made his wife executrix of his estate.

== Issue ==
Fairfax and Agnes Gascoigne had six sons and six daughters.

- On his death, he left his estate to his son Nicholas.
- William was Nicholas's twin. He settled at Bury St. Edmunds and is buried in Walsingham. He married and had John Fairfax, Master of the Great Hospital in Norwich, who married Mary Birch, who was the sister of George Birch, Sheriff of Norwich in 1604, Mayor of Norwich in 1621. His son Benjamin Fairfax, of Rumburgh, (1592 - 1675), married to Sarah Galliard, who was daughter of Roger Galliard, of Ashwell Thorpe, Norfolk, and had issue including Benjamin Fairfax, of Halesworth, Suffolk (d. 1708).
- His third son, Thomas, became a priest in the Church of England.
- His other sons were named Miles of Gilling, Guy, and Robert.

One of his famous relations is Thomas Fairfax, 3rd Lord Fairfax of Cameron (17 January 1612 – 12 November 1671), who was Parliamentary Commander-in-Chief during the English Civil War.

Preceded by Sir Thomas Fairfax	Owner of Gilling Castle; 1505–1520	Succeeded by Nicholas Fairfax
