= Listed buildings in Gilling East =

Gilling East is a civil parish in the county of North Yorkshire, England. It contains eleven listed buildings that are recorded in the National Heritage List for England. Of these, two are listed at Grade I, the highest of the three grades, and the others are at Grade II, the lowest grade. The parish contains the village of Gilling East and the surrounding countryside. The most substantial building in the parish is Gilling Castle, which is listed, together with associated structures in its garden and grounds. The other listed buildings include a church, its gateway in the form of a war memorial, a bridge, a house and stable block, and two mileposts.

== Key ==
Grade	Criteria
I	Buildings of exceptional interest, sometimes considered to be internationally important
II	Buildings of national importance and special interest

== Buildings ==
Name and location	Photograph	Date	Notes	Grade
Holy Cross Church; 54.18419°N 1.05758°W		c. 1200	The church has been altered and extended through the centuries. It is built in sandstone with a Westmorland slate roof, and consists of a nave, north and south aisles, a north porch, a chancel with a north organ chamber, and a west tower. The tower has two stages, stepped diagonal buttresses, a four-light west window with a pointed hood mould, string courses, clock faces, three-light bell openings under an elliptical arch with a hood mould, and an embattled parapet with crocketed corner pinnacles.	I
Gilling Castle; 54.18324°N 1.06487°W		Late 14th century	A country house, at one time used as a school, originating as a tower house, and subsequently altered and extended. It is in limestone and has a U-shaped plan, with a main range and wings projecting to the west. The main range has an east front of three storeys and four bays, with a plinth, quoins a canted bay window on the left and a staircase turret to the right. The windows are mullioned and transomed. The west front has two storeys and a basement, and five bays. A double-flight staircase leads to a doorway with a Gibbs surround, attached Ionic columns, a divided fanlight, and a plain pediment. The windows are sashes, those in the ground floor with Gibbs surrounds, and those in the upper floor with eared and shouldered architraves. At the top is a parapet with blind panels and six urns. The ends of the wings have canted bay windows.	I
Gateposts and railings, Gilling Castle; 54.18419°N 1.05863°W		Early 18th century	The entrance to the grounds is flanked by limestone gateposts about 3 metres (9.8 ft) high, consisting of six bulbous blocks surmounted by carved lions. Outside these are low walls with moulded upper courses, and wrought iron railings with elaborate flowers in the angles.	II
Garden seat, Gilling Castle; 54.18313°N 1.06389°W	—	Early to mid 18th century	The garden seat is in limestone, and has a C-shaped plan. It consists of a bench supported by clawed feet, with a scrolled back and arms.	II
Clock tower, Gilling Castle; 54.18375°N 1.06558°W	—	Mid 18th century	The clock tower is in limestone, and has a square plan. The clock face on the south side has a single hand and Roman numerals. Above it is an open belfry with round arches and keystones, and a lead-roofed cupola with a weathervane.	II
Gilling Bridge; 54.18883°N 1.05785°W		1800	This is the date of the widening of the bridge by John Carr. It carries the B1363 road over HolBeck, and is in limestone. The bridge consists of a single arch with a smaller arch over a culvert to the south, both arches with buttresses. The larger arch has a plain coped parapet, and there are cylindrical drums at the ends.	II
The Old Rectory; 54.18432°N 1.05711°W	—	Early 19th century	The house is in limestone with a Westmorland slate roof. There are two storeys and six bays, and a two-bay canted extension at the rear. The doorway has a plain surround and a radial fanlight, and the windows are sashes.	II
Stable block, The Old Rectory; 54.18443°N 1.05658°W	—	1840	The stable block is in limestone with a Welsh slate roof. It consists of a two-storey central block flanked by single-storey wings. The central block has a pediment containing a blind lunette inscribed with initials and the date. The block contains double carriage doors under elliptical channelled arches with keystones, above which are sash windows. The wings contain doorways and windows.	II
Milepost southwest of Coney Hill Farm; 54.16392°N 1.07926°W		Late 19th century	The milepost on the west side of the B1363 road is in cast iron. It has a triangular plan and a sloping top. On top is inscribed "RYEDALE H.D" and on the sides are pointing hands, with the distance to Helmsley on the left side and the distance to York on the right side.	II
Milepost south of Holy Cross Church; 54.18143°N 1.05571°W		Late 19th century	The milepost on the west side of the B1363 road is in cast iron. It has a triangular plan and a sloping top. On top is inscribed "RYEDALE H.D" and on the sides are pointing hands, with the distance to Helmsley on the left side and the distance to York on the right side.	II
War Memorial; 54.18416°N 1.05839°W		1921	The war memorial forms a gateway at the entrance to the churchyard of Holy Cross Church. It is in sandstone, and has wide buttressed pillars carrying a Tudor arch and a stone slate hipped roof surmounted by a fleury cross. On the lintel is a raised inscription, and on the pillars are bronze plaques with the names of those lost in the First World War.	II
