= Stonegrave =

Village and civil parish in North Yorkshire, England

Coordinates: 54.192°N 0.994°W

- Location within North Yorkshire
- OS grid reference: SE657777
- Civil parish: Stonegrave
- Unitary authority: North Yorkshire
- Ceremonial county: North Yorkshire
- Region: Yorkshire and the Humber
- Country: England
- Sovereign state: United Kingdom
- Post town: York
- Postcode district: YO62
- Police: North Yorkshire
- Fire: North Yorkshire
- Ambulance: Yorkshire
- UK Parliament: Thirsk and Malton

Stonegrave is a village and civil parish in North Yorkshire, England. At the 2011 Census the population was less than 100 and so the details are included in the civil parish of Nunnington. By 2015, North Yorkshire County Council estimated the population as 110. It is situated in the Howardian Hills Area of Outstanding Natural Beauty (AONB) and 5 miles (8 km) south east of Helmsley on the Helmsley to Malton road (the B1257).

From 1974 to 2023 it was part of the district of Ryedale. It is now administered by the unitary North Yorkshire Council.

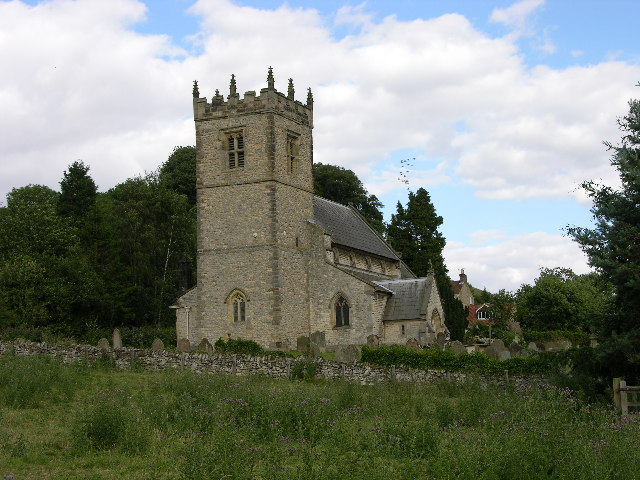
Stonegrave Minster. There was a church here in Anglo-Saxon times

The village is noted for its church, Stonegrave Minster, which has its origins in the 8th century. The tower is partly Anglo-Saxon, with the main body of the church rebuilt during the Norman period with locally quarried stone. The grade II* listed church was rebuilt in 1863. It is part of a four-parish benefice, including the churches of Oswaldkirk, Stonegrave, Gilling and Ampleforth. It is mentioned in the Domesday Book as Stengrif, with the land belonging to Ralph Pagenel.

== Notable people ==
Herbert Read, the art historian, poet, literary critic and philosopher, who was best known for numerous books on art, purchased the old rectory in the village in 1948. Read died there in 1968. His modern art and sculpture collection, alongside that of his wife's furniture, were displayed at the Grade II listed Stonegrave House in the village.

Stonegrave is also the burial place of Robert Thornton, who was a scribe and manuscript compiler. Due to his efforts, many works of Middle English literature have been preserved.

== See also ==
- Listed buildings in Stonegrave
