= Listed buildings in Oswaldkirk =

Oswaldkirk is a civil parish in the county of North Yorkshire, England. It contains eight listed buildings that are recorded in the National Heritage List for England. Of these, two are listed at Grade II*, the middle of the three grades, and the others are at Grade II, the lowest grade. The parish contains the village of Oswaldkirk and the surrounding countryside. The listed buildings consist of a church, a large house with associated structures, a smaller house, a public house, a rectory, and a milepost.

== Key ==
Grade	Criteria
II*	Particularly important buildings of more than special interest
II	Buildings of national importance and special interest

== Buildings ==
Name and location	Photograph	Date	Notes	Grade
St Oswald's Church; 54.20234°N 1.04964°W		12th century	The church has been altered and extended through the centuries, including a restoration and alterations by C. Hodgson Fowler in 1886. It is built in sandstone, limestone and millstone grit, and has a roof of Westmorland slate. The church consists of a nave with a south porch, and a chancel with a north vestry. At the west end is a small window with a trefoil head, and a square bellcote with a clock face and a plain parapet with square corner finials. The north wall of the church is Norman, and contains a doorway with two chamfered orders, and shafts with foliate capitals.	II*
Oswaldkirk Hall; 54.20229°N 1.05307°W		c. 1690	The house is in limestone on a plinth, with rusticated quoins, a floor band, a modillion cornice, and a hipped Westmorland slate roof. There are two storeys with attics, and five bays, and a service wing with one storey and an attic on the right. Steps lead up to the doorway that has an eared surround and a broken segmental pediment, and the windows are sashes in eared architraves. In the attic are three dormers with horizontally-sliding sashes. The wing has a sash window, dormers, a verandah and a bellcote.	II*
The Malt Shovel; 54.20340°N 1.04643°W		c. 1700	The public house is in limestone on a plinth, with rusticated quoins, and a stone slate roof with gable coping. The garden front has two storeys and five bays. The central doorway has an eared architrave, and a broken segmental pediment containing a coat of arms. The windows are sashes in architraves, with pulvinated friezes, and broken pediments, alternately segmental and plain. The end gable contains a mullioned window.	II
Stable block east of Oswaldkirk Hall; 54.20228°N 1.05208°W	—	Early 18th century	The stable block is in limestone, with a concave eaves course, and a roof of Welsh slate and stone slate with gable coping and shaped kneelers. There are two storeys and eight bays, consisting of a former coach house, with two cottages on the left, and a stable to the right. The middle four bays project, with quoins, and contain an arched carriage entrance, the cottages have fixed windows, and the stable has a double door. On the upper floor are fixed windows and pitching doors, and all the windows and doors have architraves and keystones.	II
Golden Square Farmhouse; 54.21403°N 1.05999°W	—	Mid-18th century	The house is in limestone, with sprocketed eaves, and a pantile roof with gable coping on the right. There are two storeys and three bays. The doorway has a divided fanlight, the windows in the ground floor are horizontal-sliding sash windows, and in the upper floor they are casements.	II
The Old Rectory; 54.20216°N 1.05044°W	—	1836	The rectory, which incorporates an 18th-century barn, is in stone with quoins and dentiled eaves. The house has a slate roof, and the roof of the barn is in pantile. The north front contains a central distyle in antis porch with two columns and two engaged pillars. The south front has a single-storey canted bay window, and most of the windows in the house are sashes, some set in blind recessed arches.	II
Pigeoncote southeast of Oswaldkirk Hall; 54.20195°N 1.05203°W	—	19th century	The pigeoncote is in limestone, with a rectangular plan, and a hipped pantile roof. Inside, there are brick nesting boxes on all sides.	II
Milepost; 54.20914°N 1.05514°W		Late 19th century	The milepost is on the northeast side of the B1257 road. It is in cast iron, with a triangular plan and a sloping top. On each side are pointing hands, the left side has the distance to Malton, and on the right side is the distance to Helmsley.	II
