= Nicholas Fairfax (d. 1571) =

16th-century English politician

Sir Nicholas Fairfax (c. 1498 – 1571), of Gilling Castle and Walton, Yorkshire, was an English politician.

He was born the eldest son of Sir Thomas Fairfax (d. 1520) of Gilling Castle and Anne Fairfax, and educated at the Middle Temple. He succeeded his father in 1520 and was knighted before 1530.

He was selected High Sheriff of Yorkshire for 1531–32, 1544–1555 and 1561–62.

He was a Member of Parliament (MP) for Scarborough in 1542 and for Yorkshire in 1547 and 1563.

He died in 1571. He had married twice: first Jane, the daughter of Guy Palmes of Naburn, with whom he had at least 8 sons and at least 4 daughters; and second Alice, the daughter of (Sir) John Harington of Exton, Rutland, and the widow of Richard Flower of Whitwell, Rutland, and of Sir Henry Sutton of Averham, Nottinghamshire. He was succeeded by his eldest son Sir William Fairfax, who was also an MP for Yorkshire and High Sheriff of the county.
