= Oswaldkirk =

Village and civil parish in North Yorkshire, England

Coordinates: 54°12′13″N 1°02′44″W

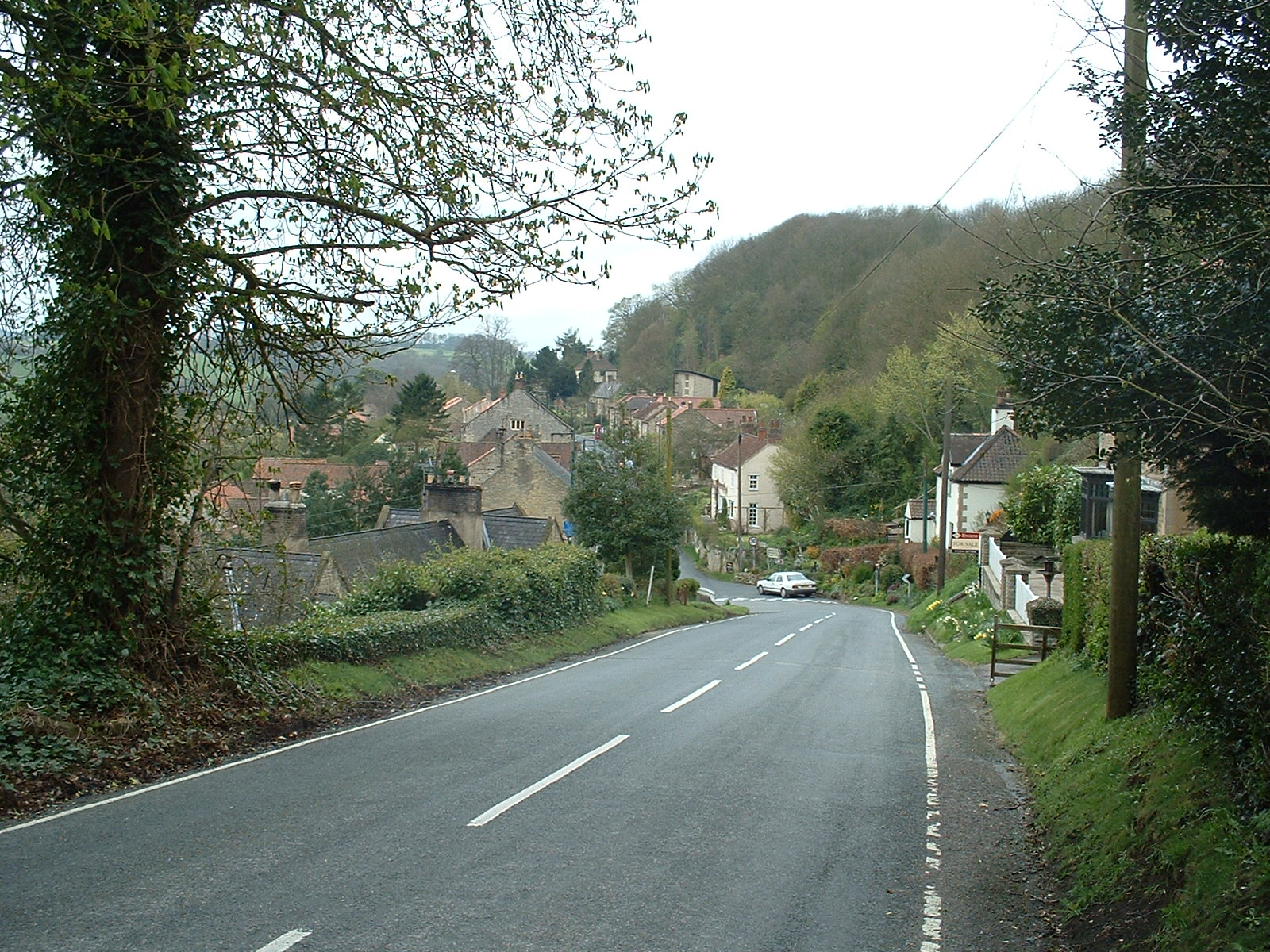
- View of village from Oswaldkirk Bank

- Location within North Yorkshire
- Population: 230
- OS grid reference: SE 6239 7909
- Civil parish: Oswaldkirk
- Unitary authority: North Yorkshire
- Ceremonial county: North Yorkshire
- Region: Yorkshire and the Humber
- Country: England
- Sovereign state: United Kingdom
- Post town: York
- Postcode district: YO62
- Dialling code: 01439
- Police: North Yorkshire
- Fire: North Yorkshire
- Ambulance: Yorkshire
- UK Parliament: Thirsk and Malton

Oswaldkirk is a small village and civil parish four miles (six kilometres) south of Helmsley and 20 miles (32 km) north of York in North Yorkshire, England. It is named after the village church of St Oswald, King and Martyr, the Anglo-Saxon King of Northumbria who was slain by the pagan, Penda in 642. There was previously the Catholic St Aidan's Church, Oswaldkirk, which closed in 2020. The population of the village as taken at the 2011 census was 230.

From 1974 to 2023 it was part of the district of Ryedale, it is now administered by the unitary North Yorkshire Council.

The village is situated at the junction of the roads B1257 and B1363 and straddles the boundaries of the North York Moors National Park and the Howardian Hills Area of Outstanding Natural Beauty. Non-ecclesiastical amenities include a playground, a village hall and The Malt Shovel pub. The Millennium Trail, a 1 3/8-mile (2.2-kilometre) circular waymarked walk around Oswaldkirk, takes in the major historical sites and points of interest. The village is also on the path of the Ebor Way.

Each year the village holds a Safari Lunch, a Cricket match and a Bonfire. Every two years there is a benefice Hog Roast (Ampleforth, Gilling East, Stonegrave & Oswaldkirk). In 2002 the village community wrote a book entitled Oswaldkirk: A Living Village. In 2008, the village reached the North of England Finals in the Calor village of the year competition, and was placed first in the "people" category.

== Geology ==
Oswaldkirk is situated to the south of a steep hill, known as "Oswaldkirk Hagg". Many springs rise along the base of the hill, at the boundary of the Kimmeridge Clay and the Corallian Oolite. The latter was mined into the twentieth century in numerous quarries on the hagg between Oswaldkirk and Ampleforth, and fossils from the limestone, especially gastropods, are often found in the village.

== History ==
The first recorded reference to Oswaldkirk was in the Domesday Book (1086). It was referred to as "Oswaldecherca" or "Oswaldecherce" (Oswald's Church).

Oswaldkirk Hall, a Grade II* listed building, was built c. 1690 for William Moor and is one of eight listed buildings or structures in the parish.

== See also ==
- Listed buildings in Oswaldkirk
