= Stonegrave Minster =

Holy Trinity Church, Stonegrave
- Church of the Holy Trinity, Stonegrave
- Stonegrave Minster
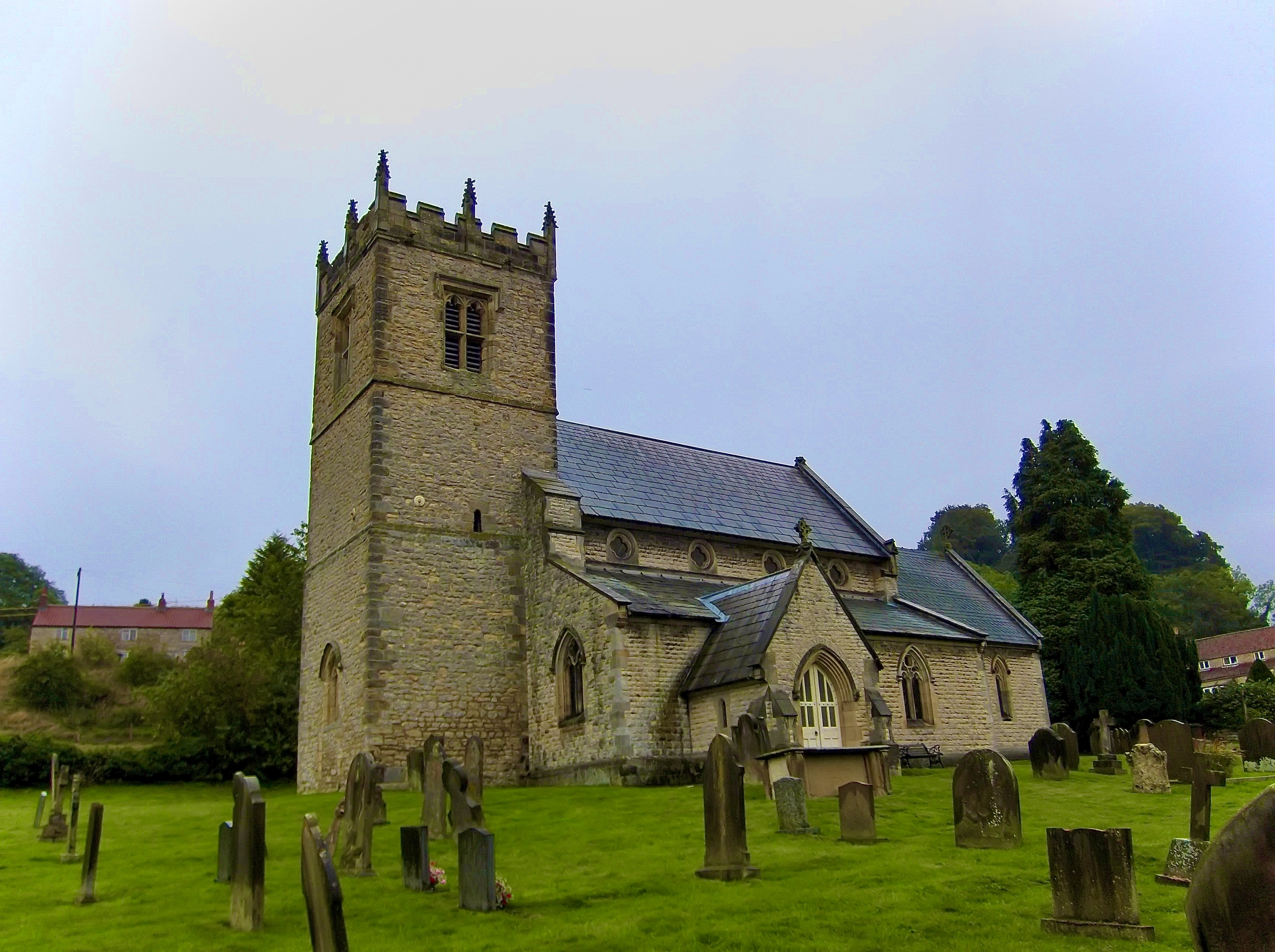
- The south-western aspect of the church

- Location within North Yorkshire
- 54.19252°N 0.99663°W
- OS grid reference: SE 65570 77880
- Location: Stonegrave, North Yorkshire
- Country: England
- Denomination: Church of England
- Website: Official website

History
- Status: Active

Administration
- Diocese: York
- Archdeaconry: Cleveland
- Deanery: Northern Ryedale
- Benefice: Ampleforth
- Parish: Stonegrave

Clergy
- Vicar: Revd James Trowsdale

Listed Building – Grade II*
- Designated: 4 January 1955
- Reference no.: 1173360

Stonegrave Minster, also known as the Holy Trinity parish church, is a church in Stonegrave, North Yorkshire, England. It is known for the heraldry adorned upon some of the tombs and monuments.

== History ==
It was an Old Minster and established before 757 AD when Pope Paul I wrote to Eadberht, King of Northumberland, about the appointment of an abbot. It was staffed by priests following the traditions of Iona and Lindisfarne and was probably founded by an earlier King of Northumberland.

The abbess or abbot ruled Coxwold, Stonegrave and a third house, Donamuthe, near where the Old Don met the Trent and Humber at Adlingfleet. This was destroyed by the Danes in 794 AD and has totally disappeared.

=== Original church ===
The original church was a high, narrow rectangular structure. Today's west wall may be a remaining feature of this; its early date is shown by the proportions of the tall, narrow doorway, still centrally placed, with a very roughly constructed arch above two irregular jambs. Such a high, narrow door played an important part in the services of the early church. Above this doorway, high in the west wall, is another doorway, now blocked, which once gave access from the tower to a chamber above the nave, possibly a dormitory or chapel. Later, the side walls of the original church were pierced by arches of the Norman north and south arcades. Original masonry seems to have survived above and between the arches themselves. The whole east end of the church was destroyed in the Norman rebuilding.

The church contains fragments from four standing crosses, together with an almost complete cross that now stands beside a rectangular block, once part of its base. All these were found during the church's restoration in 1863. The earliest fragment, with the "figure of 8 design", was carved in the ninth century, the others in the tenth. They all differ clearly from the cross fragments in neighbouring churches: they are abstract and free from animal forms; the interlace is open and arranged in double plait lines on all but the earliest. Those who commissioned them had a strong religious purpose and individual, though conservative, tastes.

The shape of the head and the style of the carving of the great cross both suggest that it was designed and carved by men trained in the traditions of Galloway and Iona and made soon after 920 AD. Three carvings interrupt the interlace on the face of the shaft. The lowest is a figure of a priest missionary of the Celtic Church, feet carved sideways as in Northumbrian manuscripts of the time, head round with the Celtic tonsure. From his neck hangs the bag in which he carried the chalice, paten and Gospels on his journeys. Above him is a plain cross, head and arms splayed like those of the head of the great cross. At the top of the shaft is a seated figure, praying with book held aloft in the fashion of the Celtic Church. The surfaces of these carvings are plain, possibly intended to be painted.

The rectangular block beside the great cross and three other fragments once formed its base. Two of the pieces have panels within which are incised outlines, in the one of an animal with a bird on its back, in the other of an animal. Neither has been satisfactorily explained.

In the 19th century, the great cross was placed on an unrelated base and both were put on the only stone with Norse carving, probably a gravestone. Within a border of interlace, there is the figure of an archer shooting an arrow at a stag. This may be a hunting scene, an incident from Viking heroic legend or a Christian symbol.

=== Norman Church ===
During the Twelfth Century, Stonegrave Minster was altered to meet the requirements of the new services and of the prestige of the de Stonegraves family. The crosses were broken up and used as building blocks. Foundations show that the chancel was lengthened and ended in an apse. A long vista was opened up, down the central aisle to the now distant altar, the new focus of worship. Arches were pierced through the north wall and a new aisle made for the chapel of St Leonard, the patron saint of prisoners of war (one of the de Stonegraves was a POW in the Near East). The north arches were all built through an earlier wall, but the arch nearest to the pulpit is of different stone from the others, which are bi-coloured after the fashion best known from Durham cathedral. The brown stone of these arches is from a quarry near Whitby and the lighter coloured stone is local, but the stone of the first arch is from a more distant quarry. The capitals differ, too. That of the first pier is plain; that of the second is prepared for carving but not carved, and that of the third has lines preparatory to carving and some carved roundels. Where the moulding of the two central arches meet are two fantastic heads.

== Heraldry and the Thornton family of East Newton ==
From 1300 to almost 1700 the north aisle was the burial place of the Thorntons, but only two of their tombs remain. The one nearest to the tower, probably that of William Thornton (d. 1330), carved in York, is unusual in having the effigy of a civilian with legs crossed. The other, of Robert Thornton and his wife (d. 1418) is of local stone and workmanship. It is now in a recess in the north wall, the canopy formed from an earlier Easter sepulchre. The tomb chest has figures supporting shields showing the simple coat-of-arms of the family at that time: three thorn sprays.

== Changing fashions ==
The Cistercians of nearby Rievaulx disliked ornament. The half capital of the north arcade nearest to the tower and the capitals of the whole of the south arcade which are slightly later (1165–1170) have no carving. The south arcade itself, again built through an early wall of which part remains, is built of stone consistent with an origin near Rievaulx and was probably made by masons from there. The arches are simpler in style yet more demanding in construction for they have two full spans that give the south side of the nave a spacious air and open wide the chapel of St Peter. The string course between these two arches resembles the courses at Rievaulx. The doorway at the eastern end of the arcade may be the remains of an entrance, used before the arches were built, to the side chapel.

== After the Reformation ==
Many medieval carvings and furnishings were removed by the Puritans in the sixteenth and early seventeenth centuries, including the lead and timber of the roof of the north aisle, taken to make the roof of the rectory. New furnishings were installed when there was a revival of ceremony during the reign of Charles I. Among the work that has survived is a light rood screen of 1637, separating but not hiding the altar from the worshippers. To this was added Alice Thornton's gift of colourful altar cloths, pulpit cloths and hangings in purple and scarlet with fine embroiderings, none of which has survived.

Other woodwork of the time that has survived suggests that there was a tall pulpit with a reading desk below, but only the pulpit remains today. The carved panels in the chancel and the screening of the vestry may have been part of the larger structure as well as part of the panelling that once covered the lower part of the sides of the chancel. The heads of kings and queens on one of these panels are not just ornaments but declarations of loyalty. A further relic of the troubles of the Civil Wars hangs on the south wall of the chancel (not its original position). It is a painted memorial to William Thornton (d. 1668), all his widow could afford after the disasters and fines of the time. The ornate coat-of-arms with its ceremonial crests contrasts with the simple statement of identity of the three thorns on the tomb chest. The painted memorial was restored by a descendant of the family now resident in New York.

== Eighteenth century ==
The eighteenth-century Church was a preaching and hymn-singing church. The altar (Holy Communion four times a year) was inconspicuous. There was a whitewashed gallery for the musicians at the back against the west wall and a lofty pulpit dominated the nave, high above the box pews. All that remains now are the pious memorials now placed on the west wall of the nave and the north wall of the chancel, by Taylor of York, examples of the style and lettering of the time.

Other eighteenth-century artifacts include a legal statement by the south door of the members of a family and their evidence of inheritance claims when possible heirs were scattered, and a stone behind the font with a record of a bequest to help repair the fabric of the church.

== Victorian restoration ==
The 1863 restoration by George Fowler Jones destroyed most of the medieval interior of the church. Some of the gravestones with floreated crosses, possibly de Stonegrave tombstones, lie in the churchyard where they were placed during the restoration. A flat gravestone of Purbeck marble, which once had letters and the head and shoulders of a man inlaid in brass (c. 1300) was placed near the south door – not its original position. The marble was imported by way of Scarborough or Whitby and the indents of the letters show that they were made in York or Lincoln. There is a tombstone with engraved shears beneath the great cross.

== See also ==
- Grade II* listed buildings in North Yorkshire (district)
- Listed buildings in Stonegrave
