= St Hilda's Church, Ampleforth =

Church in Ampleforth, North Yorkshire, England

Coordinates: 54°12′01″N 1°06′28″W

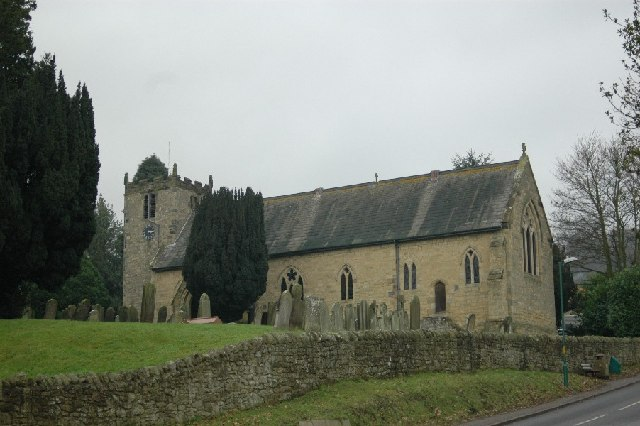
The church, in 2006

St Hilda's Church is the parish church of Ampleforth, a village in North Yorkshire, in England.

The church was first built in mid 12th century, although only the tower arch and reset north doorway survive from this period. The south doorway dates from the early 13th century, and the chancel was rebuilt later in the century, when new windows were added to the nave. The tower was rebuilt in the 16th century. In 1868, T. H. and F. Healey undertook a heavy restoration of the church, adding a north aisle, replacing the east window, and refacing the walls. The church was Grade II listed in 1955.

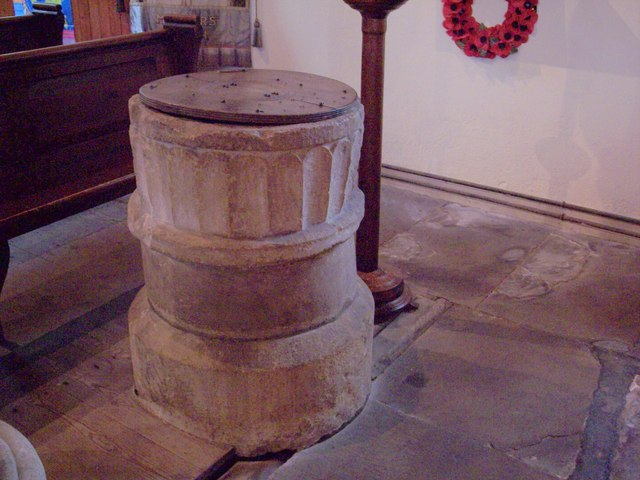
The font

The church is built of limestone, and has a slate roof. It consists of a west tower, a four-bay nave, and a two-bay chancel. The tower has a trefoil-headed window to the west and belfry windows on each side, and is topped with battlements and pinnacles. The north door has rough carvings, some of which depict the signs of the zodiac. Inside, there is a 12th-century font, a 14th-century effigy of a man and woman, and a tomb slab of similar date.

== See also ==
- Listed buildings in Ampleforth
