= Oswaldkirk Hall =

Building in Oswaldkirk, North Yorkshire, England

Coordinates: 54.2023°N 1.0531°W

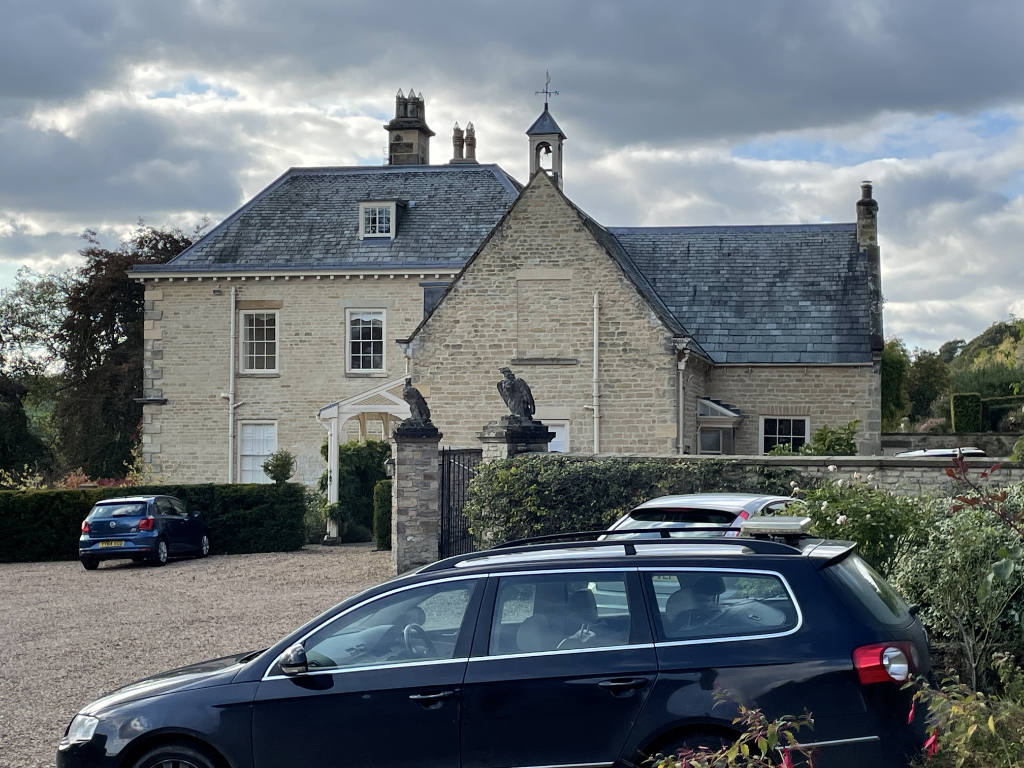
The house, in 2024

Oswaldkirk Hall is a historic building in Oswaldkirk, a village in North Yorkshire, in England.

The oldest part of the country house is the service wing, at the rear, probably built by the Cholmeley family. In 1674, they sold the house to William Moore, who demolished the remainder of it and built the current hall, completing the work in about 1690. It is described by Giles Worsley as an "architecturally distinguished Classical house". A verandah was added in the 19th century, and at some point the entrance was moved to the side of the house. The building was grade II* listed in 1955.

The house is built of limestone on a plinth, with rusticated quoins, a floor band, a modillion cornice, and a hipped Westmorland slate roof. There are two storeys with attics, and five bays, and a service wing with one storey and an attic on the right. Steps lead up to the doorway that has an eared surround and a broken segmental pediment, and the windows are sashes in eared architraves. In the attic are three dormers with horizontally sliding sashes. The wing has a sash window, dormers, a verandah and a bellcote. Inside, the reception rooms have early 18th-century decoration including panelling and plastered ceilings.

== See also ==
- Grade II* listed buildings in North Yorkshire (district)
- Listed buildings in Oswaldkirk
