= Listed buildings in Stonegrave =

Stonegrave is a civil parish in the county of North Yorkshire, England. It contains ten listed buildings that are recorded in the National Heritage List for England. Of these, one is listed at Grade II*, the middle of the three grades, and the others are at Grade II, the lowest grade. The parish contains the village of Stonegrave and the surrounding countryside. Most of the listed buildings are houses, farmhouses and associated structures, and the others are a church and three mileposts.

== Key ==
Grade	Criteria
II*	Particularly important buildings of more than special interest
II	Buildings of national importance and special interest

== Buildings ==
Name and location	Photograph	Date	Notes	Grade
Holy Trinity Church; 54.19252°N 0.99654°W		Saxon	The tower dates from the early 12th century, and the body of the church results from rebuilding and restoration in 1862–63 by G. Fowler Jones. The church is built in limestone with a Westmorland slate roof. It consists of a nave with a clerestory, north and south aisles, a south porch, a chancel with a north organ chamber, and a west tower. The tower has three stages, a two-light west window, a small round-headed window on the south face of the middle stage, two-light bell openings, and an embattled parapet with crocketed corner and intermediate pinnacles.	II*
East Newton Hall and barn 54.20638°N 1.01465°W		c. 1620–30	This consists of two parallel ranges of a former house, the major part of which has been demolished, later used as a house and a barn. They are in limestone, and have stone slate roofs with gable coping and shaped kneelers. The house has two storeys and four bays. On the front is a doorway, and the windows are a mix of sashes and mullioned windows, and there is a blocked mullioned and transomed window. The barn contains blocked mullioned windows.	II
Stonegrave House; 54.19188°N 0.99533°W		Late 17th century	Wings were added to the house in 1768. The house is in limestone, and it has a pantile roof with gable coping and shaped kneelers. There are two storeys, a main range of five bays, and projecting two-bay wings. The central doorway has a divided fanlight and a moulded cornice on consoles, and there is a doorway with a plain surround on the left wing. On the main range and left wing are fixed light windows and blind windows, and the right wing has sash windows. In front of the house are square stone chamfered gate posts with pyramidal finials, and cast iron gates and railings.	II
South Farmhouse; 54.19121°N 0.99037°W	—	Late 17th to early 18th century	The farmhouse is in limestone with a swept pantile roof. There are four bays, the left three bays with two storeys and the fourth with three, and a continuous rear outshut. The doorway has a divided fanlight, and the windows are casements, most with wedge lintels.	II
Apiary east of Stonegrave House; 54.19176°N 0.99495°W	—	18th century	The apiary is in limestone with some brick patching, and has a hipped pantile roof. There is a single storey and a rectangular plan, and on the south side is a fixed window. Inside, there are elliptical-arched niches.	II
Outbuildings west of Stonegrave House; 54.19194°N 0.99578°W	—	Late 18th century	The outbuildings are in limestone, and have pantile roofs with gable copings and kneelers, and are in a linear arrangement. In the centre is a coach house with two storeys, containing an elliptical arch with an oculus above. The stables have two storeys and external steps leading to a former hay loft. The other buildings have one storey and consist of a garage, and utility rooms with fixed windows and a two-light horizontally sliding sash window.	II
Manor Farmhouse; 54.19116°N 0.99126°W	—	Late 18th to early 19th century	Three dwellings, later a house and a cottage, in limestone with a pantile roof. There are three storeys and five bays, and flanking outshuts, the left bay forming the cottage. On the garden front are three doorways, and the windows are a mix of casements and sashes, some horizontally sliding.	II
Milepost near South Farm; 54.19049°N 0.98845°W		Late 19th century	The milepost is on the north side of the B1257 road, and is in cast iron. It has a triangular plan and a sloping top. On each side is a pointing hand, on the left side is the distance to Malton, and on the right side to Helmsley.	II
Milepost near Stonegrave Lodge; 54.19727°N 1.01001°W		Late 19th century	The milepost is on the north side of the B1257 road, and is in cast iron. It has a triangular plan and a sloping top. On each side is a pointing hand, on the left side is the distance to Malton, and on the right side to Helmsley.	II
Milepost near Birch House; 54.20390°N 1.03228°W		Late 19th century	The milepost is on the north side of the B1257 road, and is in cast iron. It has a triangular plan and a sloping top. On each side is a pointing hand, on the left side is the distance to Malton, and on the right side to Helmsley.	II
