= Listed buildings in Ampleforth =

Ampleforth is a civil parish in the county of North Yorkshire, England. It contains 17 listed buildings that are recorded in the National Heritage List for England. Of these, one is listed at Grade I, the highest of the three grades, and the others are at Grade II, the lowest grade. The parish contains the village of Ampleforth and the surrounding area. To the east of the village are Ampleforth Abbey and Ampleforth College, which contain a listed church, a study block and a bridge. Most of the other listed buildings are houses, cottages and a church in the village, and in the countryside to the south is a listed farmhouse.

== Key ==
Grade	Criteria
I	Buildings of exceptional interest, sometimes considered to be internationally important
II	Buildings of national importance and special interest

== Buildings ==
Name and location	Photograph	Date	Notes	Grade
St Hilda's Church; 54.20025°N 1.10785°W		12th century	The oldest parts of the church are the lower part of the tower and the two doorways, the rest of the church being rebuilt in 1868. It is built in limestone with a Welsh slate roof, and consists of a nave, a north aisle, a south porch, a chancel and a west tower. The tower has a plinth, a west window with a trefoil head, a clock face on the north, two-light bell openings, and an embattled parapet with corner pinnacles. The north doorway is reset in the aisle, and is round-headed with two orders, one with beakheads, and a carved hood mould. The south doorway is also round-headed, with two moulded orders, shafts with foliate capitals, and a decorated hood mould.	II
Daleside; 54.20117°N 1.10633°W	—	17th century or earlier	The house, which was later much rebuilt, has a cruck-framed core, it is encased in limestone, and has a Westmorland slate roof. There are two storeys, three bays on the front and five at the rear. The windows are casements, there is a French door, and dormers. Inside there is a pair of massive crucks, 24 feet (7.3 m) high.	II
Fern Villa; 54.20027°N 1.11353°W	—	Early 18th century	The house, later divided, is in limestone with Welsh slate roof. There are two storeys and three bays, and the windows are sashes. Inside, there is a massive bressummer and an inglenook fireplace.	II
Ford End House; 54.20059°N 1.11303°W		Mid 18th century	A house with an attached cottage, the cottage being the older part, the house dating from the later 18th century. They are in limestone, the house with a Welsh slate roof, and the cottage has a pantile roof with a coped gable and shaped kneelers. The house has two storeys and an attic, and three bays. The central doorway has a divided fanlight, the windows are sashes, and in the roof is a gabled dormer. The cottage has two storeys, a single bay, and sprocketed eaves. The doorway is blocked, and the windows are horizontally-sliding sashes.	II
1 Foxglove Cottages; 54.20146°N 1.10115°W	—	Mid to late 18th century	The house is in limestone, and has a swept pantile roof with coped gables and shaped kneelers. There are two storeys and three bays. On the front is a doorway in a porch, there is one fixed window, and the other windows are horizontally-sliding sashes.	II
Stable Cottage; 54.20147°N 1.10541°W	—	Mid to late 18th century	The house is in sandstone, and has a pantile roof with a coped gable and shaped kneelers. There are two storeys and two bays. Steps lead up to a doorway with a divided fanlight, to its right is a small casement window, the other windows are sashes, and all the openings have channelled wedge lintels.	II
Cross House; 54.20077°N 1.11162°W	—	Late 18th century	A house and a service wing later incorporated into the house, in limestone with sprocketed eaves and a pantile roof. There are two storeys and five bays, the former service wing on the right. The doorway has fluted pilasters and a fanlight. To the right are garage doors, and the windows are a mix of sashes and fixed windows.	II
Marian House; 54.20094°N 1.10900°W	—	Late 18th century	The house is in limestone with a swept pantile roof. There are two storeys, three bays, and a rear cross wing. The central doorway and the windows, which are sashes, have lintels with keystones.	II
Watergate Farmhouse; 54.19362°N 1.11228°W		Late 18th century	The farmhouse is in limestone, and has a pantile roof with coped gables and shaped kneelers. There are two storeys, the main block has two bays, there is a lower service wing to the left and a cross-wing at the rear. Most of the windows are casements, and in the upper floor of the service wing is a two-light horizontally-sliding sash window.	II
The Manor House; 54.20148°N 1.10528°W		Late 18th to early 19th century	The house is in sandstone, and has a pantile roof at two levels, with coped gables and shaped kneelers to the right of both sections. There are two storeys, the main block has three bays, and to the right is a lower service wing. In the centre of the main block is a doorway with a divided fanlight, the windows are sashes, and all the openings have channelled wedge lintels. In the ground floor of the service wing are sash windows with wedge lintels, and above is a two-light horizontally-sliding sash window.	II
Ash Ling; 54.20081°N 1.11132°W	—	Early 19th century	The house, which was later altered, is in limestone with a pantile roof, two storeys and three bays. The central doorway has a divided fanlight, above it is a datestone, and the windows are horizontally-sliding sashes.	II
Maynards; 54.20083°N 1.11114°W	—	Early 19th century	The house is in limestone with a pantile roof. There are two storeys and four bays, and the windows are sashes.	II
The Cottage; 54.20081°N 1.11305°W	—	Early 19th century	A house in limestone with sprocketed eaves and a pantile roof. There are two storeys and two bays. In the centre is a doorway, and the windows are sashes.	II
The Owlet; 54.20080°N 1.11317°W	—	Early 19th century	The house is in limestone with sprocketed eaves and a pantile roof. There are two storeys and two bays. The doorway has a divided fanlight, and the windows are sashes.	II
Bridge from Ampleforth Abbey; 54.20266°N 1.08384°W		c. 1854	The footbridge crosses a road, and links the precincts of the abbey to Ampleforth Bank. It is in rusticated limestone, and consists of an arch with a stepped parapet over the road, and a second arch to the north built into the bank.	II
The Study Block, Ampleforth College; 54.20189°N 1.08346°W	—	1861	The block in Ampleforth College was designed by Joseph Hansom in Gothic style. It is in limestone with a Welsh slate roof, and has two storeys and attics, and eleven bays. Most of the windows are transomed with trefoil heads, in the upper floor is an oriel window, and in the attic are seven dormers. On the front is an octagonal clock tower with a Tudor arched doorway, staircase windows, two-light bell openings and clock faces, and an embattled parapet.	II
The Abbey Church; 54.20187°N 1.08476°W		1922–24	The church of Ampleforth Abbey was designed by Giles Gilbert Scott, and built in two phases, the later phase from 1958 to 1961. It is built in limestone and has roofs of various materials. The church has a cruciform plan, with a sanctuary at the crossing over which is a tower, a retrochoir to the west and a nave to the east, both with side chapels, and a narrow north aisle. Underneath is a crypt with 25 chapels. The tower has clasping buttresses, three pairs of bell openings on each face, and a lightly embattled parapet.	I
