= Thomas Etton =

- Lord of Gilling
- Arms of Thomas Etton; Barry of eight, argent and gules, on a canton sable, a cross patonce or
- Predecessor: Thomas Etton
- Successor: John Etton
- Died: 1402
- Issue: John

Sir Thomas Etton (Thomas de Etton), of Gilling, Yorkshire was a 14th-15th century English noble. He died in 1402.

== Life ==
Thomas was the son and heir of Thomas Etton of Gilling and Elizabeth Fairfax. Thomas was present during the Battle of Nájera, La Rioja, Castile on 3 April 1367 and his name appears in letters of protection during John of Gaunt, Duke of Lancaster's campaign in the Pays de Caux region in Normandy in 1369.

== Marriage and issue ==
Thomas Etton, married Isabel, sister and heiress of John Dayveil, and widow of Richard Wilsthorp. They are known to have had the following issue:

- John Etton (d. 1433), married firstly Katherine Everingham and secondly Elizabeth Pigot, had issue.
- George
- William
- Richard
- Katherine
- Elizabeth
