= Vincent Haddelsey =

English painter

- The artist in 1978
- Born: 13 April 1934; Grimsby, United Kingdom
- Died: 29 August 2010 (aged 76); Paris, France
- Occupation: Equestrian painter
- Years active: 1954–2000

Vincent Haddelsey (13 April 1934 – 29 August 2010) was an English naïve painter, who focused on landscapes and horses.

== Early life ==
Vincent Haddelsey was born in Bargate, Grimsby, England, on April 13, 1934. He was the only child of Sam Haddelsey, and Mary Lucy (nee Tierney). His father was a lawyer, and his grandfather and great-grandfather had also worked in the legal profession. At the end of the Second World War, the family moved to Canwick, a rural village just outside Lincoln. Canwick House had stables, and was surrounded by farms which still used shire horses for agricultural work, all of which taught him to look on horses as part of life. He attended the Catholic boarding school Ampleforth College in Yorkshire, England, and during the holidays enjoyed riding out with the Blankney Hunt and being on foot with the Cranwell Beagles, which led to his lifelong skill in horsemanship.

His two grandmothers were gifted painters, and when he was eight his maternal grandmother started him off with oils by giving him her own paint box, brushes and palette. He never had a formal art lesson, not even at school - he mostly taught himself.

== Career ==
When he was 18 Haddelsey emigrated to British Columbia, where he worked for several years in a construction camp, while struggling to paint in the winter. He became fascinated by the indigenous peoples and their collective folk art. This experience, which he described as a 'collective folk memory', led to his collaboration with the author Gordon Robinson in the production of Tales of Kitamaat (1956) for which Haddelsey provided the illustrations. This book was a collection of traditional stories told by the H'aisla people of British Columbia, collected by Robinson, himself a H'aisla, the hereditary Chief of the Beaver Clan.

In 1965 Haddelsey travelled to Mexico, where he intended to paint members of the Charros tribe. He took part in a rodeo and was as a result invited to become the member of a Mexican association of elite horsemen. He then moved to Paris where he established himself as an artist, and in 1969 won the International Grand Prix for naif painters at Lugano.

Ghost story, from Haddelsey's Horses, 1978. The ghost is waiting to hitch a ride home (on a motorbike, not a horse).

In 1971 Haddelsey published The Horse, Our Heritage which explored the equestrian world in some detail, from the Household Cavalry to polo. The book included a selection of Haddelsey's pictures, as well as his explanatory line drawings. In this collection, Haddelsey wrote the text himself, but for his next book he collaborated with equestrian author and journalist Caroline Silver to produce a 64-page showcase of his equestrian paintings. This was Haddelsey's Horses: The Paintings of Vincent Haddelsey (1978) consisting of full-page colour plates of his work, with a text provided by Silver. "Many of Haddelsey's paintings tell a story," writes Silver: one tells of a bull who wouldn't eat, who ends up on a pub sign, another tells of a ghost who hitches a ride home on a motorbike, then disappears (characteristically, horses feature in both paintings). 1978 was also the year of Haddelsey's marriage - to Caroline Silver (who had divorced her first husband in 1970).

In 1980, Vincent Haddelsey went on a journey to Inner Mongolia, where he studied and painted the Mongolian Pony. Various paintings resulted from this trip.

In 1989 Vincent travelled to Chile staying with his cousin Margaret Lunt (née Millen) whose husband John was stationed with the British Embassy as the Defence Attache. Vincent visited a number of Quasimodo horse gatherings and drew many sketches and pencil drawings of the riders and horses of Chile.

Preferring to be known as an "equestrian painter" rather than an artist, Haddelsey exhibited widely, and has paintings included in the Royal collection among others. He died on 29 August 2010 in Paris, having suffered from dementia during the final years of his life.

== Works ==
=== Paintings ===
- Gstaad
- Village of the Fourth Banner, Inner Mongolia (1980 or later)
- Herding Cattle, Inner Mongolia (1980 or later)

=== Books ===
- Gordon Robinson, illustrated by Vincent Haddelsey, Tales of Kitamaat, Northern Sentinel Press, British Columbia, 1956
- Vincent Haddelsey, The Horse, Our Heritage, Arthur Niggli, 1971, ISBN 978-3-7212-0049-2
- Vincent Haddelsey, with Caroline Silver, Haddelsey's Horses: The Paintings of Vincent Haddelsey, Jonathon Cape, London 1978
