= Ampleforth College =

Public school in Ampleforth, North Yorkshire, England

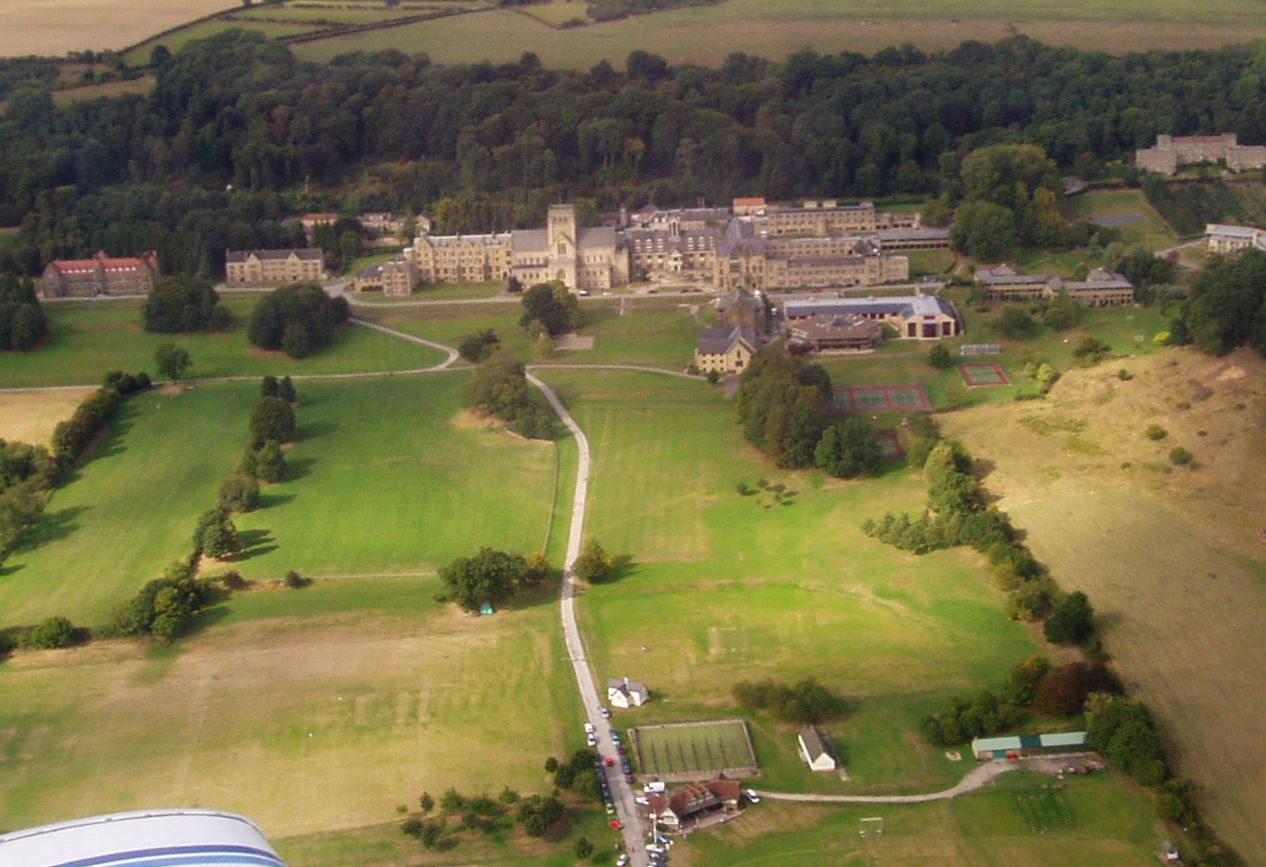
- Ampleforth and the Valley from the air

Location
- Ampleforth, North Yorkshire, YO62 4ER; England; 54.2018°N 1.0839°W

Information
- Type: Public school Private boarding and day school
- Motto: Dieu le ward (Anglo-Norman for God the protector)
- Religious affiliation: Catholic (Benedictine)
- Established: 1803; 223 years ago
- Local authority: North Yorkshire
- Department for Education URN: 121735 Tables
- Ofsted: Reports
- Chair: Edward Sparrow
- Headmaster: Jon Mutton
- Gender: Co-educational
- Age: 11 to 18
- Enrolment: 404 (2025)
- Capacity: 600
- Student to teacher ratio: 6:1
- Campus size: 2,200-acre (890 ha)
- Campus type: Semi-rural
- Colours: Black and red
- Budget: £15,643,231 (2024)
- Revenue: £16,345,341 (2024)
- Former pupils: Old Amplefordians
- Publications: Ampleforth Diary: A modern termly update of school life Ampleforth Journal: An historical archive of the school and community
- Diocese: Middlesbrough
- Website: www.ampleforthcollege.org.uk/college

Ampleforth College is a coeducational public school (English private boarding and day school) for pupils aged 11–18, near the village of Ampleforth, North Yorkshire, England. It opened in 1803 as a boys' school, on the grounds of Ampleforth Abbey, a Benedictine monastery.

The school is set in a valley with sports pitches, wooded areas, and lakes, and has the oldest purpose-built school theatre in the United Kingdom, a dedicated student pub, and its own infirmary.

The school has received national attention for significant safeguarding failures.

St Laurence Educational Trust and the Ampleforth Abbey Trust are responsible for running Ampleforth College. Boarding fees were £46,740 for the school year 2024/2025.

== History ==
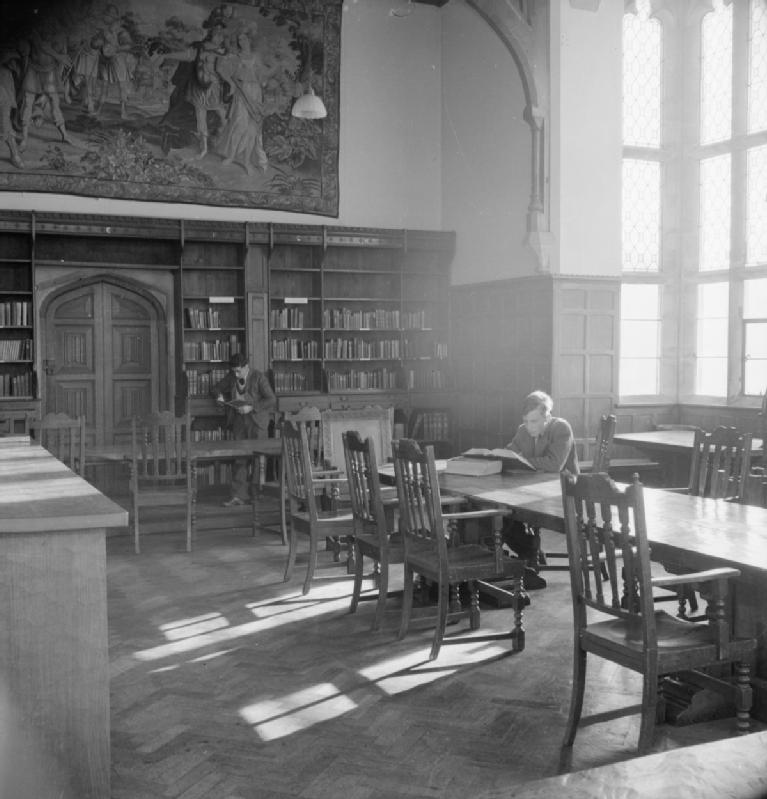
Pupils work in the library at Ampleforth in 1943

The college began as a small school for 70 boys founded by Benedictine monks, at Ampleforth Abbey, in 1803.

The Abbey and school were built upon Anne Fairfax's generous donation of land. Fairfax herself had attended the Bar Convent School in York, now known as All Saints. This connection has fostered a lasting partnership between the two schools.

The school formally constituted as a Catholic boarding school in 1900. Various buildings were slowly added, including the school theatre which was built in 1909. The first performances took place in 1910, and in 1922 a cinema projector was acquired, but could not be used until the following year when electric lighting and central heating were installed.

The first boarding houses were founded in 1926 to accommodate the growing pupil numbers. In 1929, the Abbey gained ownership of Gilling Castle and opened a preparatory school. Gilling Castle Prep merged with the college's junior school in 1992 before taking on its current name St Martin's Ampleforth after absorbing another nearby prep school.

In 1998, girls were admitted for the first time when the sixth form became coeducational. The first girls' boarding house, St Aidan's, was opened in 2001, followed by St. Margaret's in 2004 to extend coeducation to the Year 9 intake. The college is now fully coeducational.

Since the Catholic emancipation, Ampleforth gained a reputation as one of several schools, alongside Downside School, The Oratory School and Stonyhurst, popular within the Catholic aristocracy and labelled the "Catholic Eton"; it has been noted, however, that falling academic standards have seen many Catholics turn away from the school.

=== College tramway ===
In 1895, the North Eastern Railway built a 3 foot (0.91 m) gauge tramway from Gilling station on the Thirsk to Malton Line. The tram was horse-drawn, and provided coal for the college to produce gas. It also transported passengers in open wagons. The tramway closed in 1923 when the college changed to electric lighting.

== Education ==
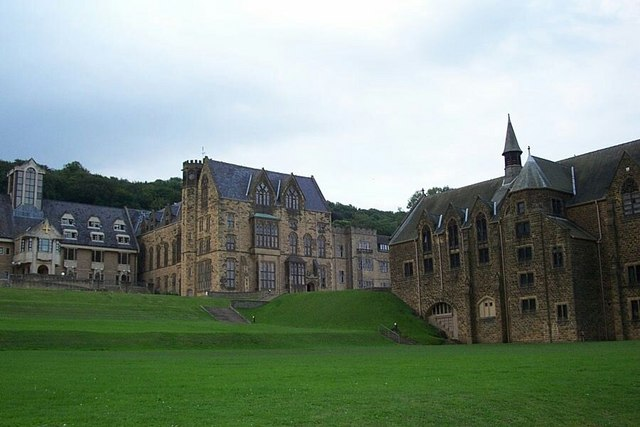
Ampleforth Abbey and College

The school says that its primary concern is to provide pupils with not just academic, sporting and other achievements, but also "a spiritual compass for life": moral principles to give guidance in a secular world; within a context where the "Benedictine ethos permeates pupils' experience".

The Good Schools Guide called the school an "Unfailingly civilised and understanding top co-educational boarding Catholic school that has suffered from time to time as a result of its long liberal tradition." The Guide adds also that there is "A refreshing openness and honesty about the place these days."

Its academic admissions policy is not as exacting as that exercised by some other English public schools. The school is typically between 150-200 in the annual league tables of public examination results, although it was ranked 6th nationally in the 2004 "value added" table. It maintains a scholarship set, with about 5% of pupils gaining the offer of a place at Oxford or Cambridge. More than 90% go on to university.

In 2018 the school failed an inspection by the Independent Schools Inspectorate regarding boarding provision, and the school was issued with a formal notice requiring the school to produce an Action Plan to resolve the failings. The Charity Commission had earlier removed pupil safeguarding responsibilities from the school's trustees, and the headmaster had been suspended from the Headmasters' and Headmistresses' Conference over safeguarding concerns.

In May 2019, the Department of Education performed an unannounced inspection, with poor results. In July 2019 it was reported that the school's acting head was stepping down after 10 months in the job. However, in spring 2019 the school passed a compliance inspection under a new head.

Following a September 2020 report, still unpublished as of November 2020, the Secretary of State for Education, Gavin Williamson, wrote to the college ordering them to stop admitting new pupils over safeguarding failures; the college said that it intended to appeal. The ban was lifted the following April.

== School life ==
Though originally a boys' school the college is now fully co-educational. In 2009 an OFSTED Social Care report said that the overall quality of care was outstanding; in 2013 it was deemed "excellent".

The college sports centre, named after Saint Alban, is also available for private hire.

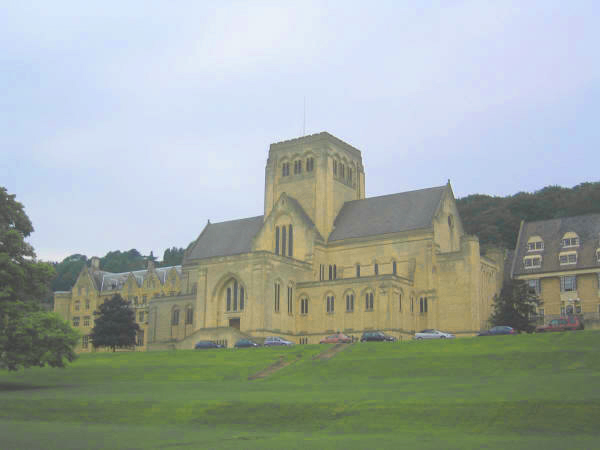
Ampleforth Abbey

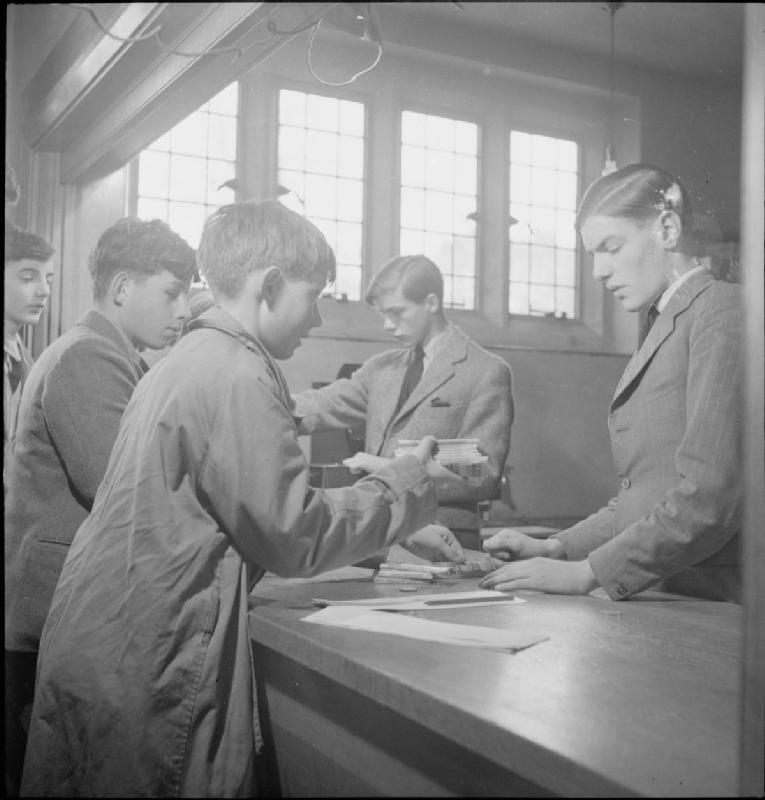
Boys buy sweets from the tuck shop at Ampleforth in 1943

== Controversies ==
=== Fee-fixing ===
In September 2005, Ampleforth was one of fifty of the country's leading independent schools which were found by the Office of Fair Trading to be operating a fee-fixing cartel in breach of the Competition Act of 1998. All of the schools were ordered to abandon this practice, pay a nominal penalty of £10,000 each (with minor exceptions) and make ex-gratia payments totalling three million pounds into a trust designed to benefit pupils who attended the schools during the period in respect of which fee information was shared. Mrs Jean Scott, the head of the Independent Schools Council, said that they were unaware that the law had changed, and that private schools had not known that they had become subject to competition law.

=== Safeguarding ===
Initially several monks and three members of the lay teaching staff were accused of molesting children in their care over a period of several decades. In 2005, Father Piers Grant-Ferris admitted 20 incidents of child abuse. The Yorkshire Post reported in 2005: "Pupils at a leading Roman Catholic school suffered decades of abuse from at least six paedophiles following a decision by former Abbot Basil Hume [later a cardinal, and Archbishop of Westminster] not to call in police at the beginning of the scandal." Following the case, the Abbot, Fr Cuthbert Madden, offered a "heartfelt apology" to the victims of one member of staff.

The College thereafter established a safeguarding policy, later judged inadequate (see below), but which was said to follow the local inter-agency procedures of the North Yorkshire Safeguarding Children Board and the guidance given in the Education (Independent School Standards) (England) Regulations 2010 and the National Minimum Standards for Boarding Schools. In accordance with this policy, in 2016 Fr Madden temporarily stepped down from his role of Chairman of Governors during the investigation of indecent assault allegations made by four former pupils. Based on the evidence available no further police action was taken, however the English Benedictine Congregation refused to allow him to resume his role.

In April 2018, the Charity Commission appointed a lawyer to take charge of safeguarding at Ampleforth College, as it was not satisfied that the trustees of the charities that run the college had made enough progress in improving pupil safeguarding.

The Independent Inquiry into Child Sexual Abuse (IICSA) investigated the English Benedictine Congregation, including Ampleforth College and Downside School, amongst other institutions, and published a report in August 2018. Ten individuals from the two schools, including monks, were convicted or accepted a caution for abuse. The report said that abuse was inflicted on pupils over 40 years, but the schools tried to cover up allegations. The Chair of the Inquiry, Prof. Alexis Jay, said that the schools for decades tried to avoid giving any information to police or authorities, with monks being "secretive, evasive and suspicious of anyone outside the English Benedictine Congregation", prioritising "the reputation of the Church and the wellbeing of the abusive monks" over safeguarding. New procedures were introduced in 2001 following the Nolan Report, recommending that abuse should be referred to the statutory authorities, however allegations continued to be handled internally.

The Department for Education released a report in November 2020 following an inspection, claiming that the school in some respects appeared to have relapsed in the year since the change of leadership. The school was forbidden from admitting new pupils. The school responded that it had taken "very considerable steps forward" and put in place "a robust safeguarding regime, a new senior leadership team, and a new governance structure that has effectively separated the abbey from the college", and said that it intended to appeal the decision. The admissions ban, due to come in place on 29 December, was delayed. In his first interview on the matter, headmaster Robin Dyer stated in December 2020 that there was "no evidence expressed in the report" of any instances "to do with emergencies [or] to do with harm to children". Arguing that the Ofsted report was "less than complete" and had little to do with his tenure as headmaster, he requested that a new inspection be conducted in January. Following a further Ofsted inspection, in April 2021 the admissions ban was lifted by the Secretary of State for Education, Gavin Williamson. Inspectors reported that they were satisfied with Ampleforth's progress, and the Department for Education signed off on the school's safeguarding action plan.

An Ofsted report, following an inspection at the end of 2021, found that the school did not meet independent school standards or national minimum standards for boarding schools in several areas. They rated the school "Inadequate" for "Overall experiences and progress of children and young people", specifically those with special educational needs and/or disabilities; "How well children and young people are helped and protected"; and "The effectiveness of leaders and managers"; although rated the quality of education as "Good". The school disputed these findings as unsubstantiated or factually inaccurate, citing evidence, including quotes from a police report, that was inconsistent with Ofsted's findings. The school also referenced multiple independent audits which contradicted the report, and two Ofsted surveys which found 100% of parents felt their child was safe and happy, and 99.6% of students felt safe. Local MP Kevin Hollinrake stated that "I want to make clear that I am supportive of the school in this situation, and I feel that there is a fundamental dispute of the facts behind the assessment, that needs to be resolved". A 2023 Ofsted inspection rated the college as "good".

The Charity Commission reported in 2024 that its inquiry had found many "serious abuse allegations" of offences committed against pupils by monks and staff over the preceding decade, with "significant weaknesses" in the safeguarding, governance and management of the two trusts running the college.

=== Construction ===
Ampleforth Abbey Trust successfully sued project management firm Turner & Townsend in 2012 when the latter engaged a construction company to build residential accommodation for college students, relying on a series of letters of intent instead of a formal contract. The college's position was undermined in the absence of a contract, and the court found that Turner & Townsend had breached their duty of care in leaving the trust exposed without contractual protection.

== List of headmasters (incomplete) ==
- Dom Edmund Matthews (1903–1924)
- Dom Paul Nevill (1924–1954)
- Dom William Price (1954–1964)
- Dom Patrick Barry (1964–1979)
- Dom Dominic Milroy (1980–1991)
- Dom Leo Chamberlain (1992–2003)
- Dom Gabriel Evett (2004–2013)
- David Lambon (2013–2016)
- Dom Wulstan Peterburs (2016–2019)
- Robin Dyer (2019–2022)
- Peter Roberts (2023–2024)
- Jon Mutton (2025–)

== Notable Old Amplefordians ==
The school has educated many notable figures including King Letsie III of Lesotho; Rupert Everett; David Stirling, Edward Stourton, Lord Fellowes of West Stafford; Lord Bamford; Sir Antony Gormley; James O'Brien; Timothy Oulton; Robert Nairac; actor James Norton; painter Vincent Haddelsey, Rugby World Cup winner Lawrence Dallaglio; authors Piers Paul Read and John William Polidori; historians William Dalrymple, Patrick French and John Keay.

== See also ==
- Listed buildings in Ampleforth
