= Thomas Fairfax (d. 1505) =

15th century English landowner

Sir Thomas Fairfax (c. 1450 – 31 March 1505) was the first member of the Fairfax family to own Gilling Castle, near Gilling East, North Riding of Yorkshire, England.

He was presumably a supporter of the House of York in the Wars of the Roses. His original home was near the Battle of Towton, which decided the outcome of that war. From 1489 to 1492, he successfully claimed the ownership of the Gilling Estate during two inquisitions. In 1349, Margaret de Etton, the sister of Thomas de Etton who owned the estate at that time and had erected its tower, married Fairfax's ancestor, another Thomas Fairfax, and stipulated that the estate would pass to the Fairfax family if there were to be no de Etton heirs. Historian John Marwood wrote that "it could be argued that the rightful heirs had at last come home." When Fairfax inherited the estate, he became the Fairfax of Walton and Gilling.

In 1505, the castle was essentially a large tower that was defensible against Scottish raiders, but not against a long siege. Historian John Marwood states that it was the largest tower-house in England. Its estate consisted of a water mill, 30 houses, 300 acres of attached land, 300 acres of wood and 1,000 acres of moor.

Fairfax was invested as a Knight of the Bath in 1495. He married Elizabeth Shireburn of Stonyhurst, Lancashire, by whom he had 10 children. Their eldest son Thomas inherited the estate upon the elder Thomas' death. According to Marwood, "there appears little to report from Thomas' life."

Preceded by Edmund Hastings	Owner of Gilling Castle c. 1492–1505	Succeeded by Sir Thomas Fairfax
