= Malt Shovel (sculpture) =

2001 sculpture by A. Hazell in Burton upon Trent

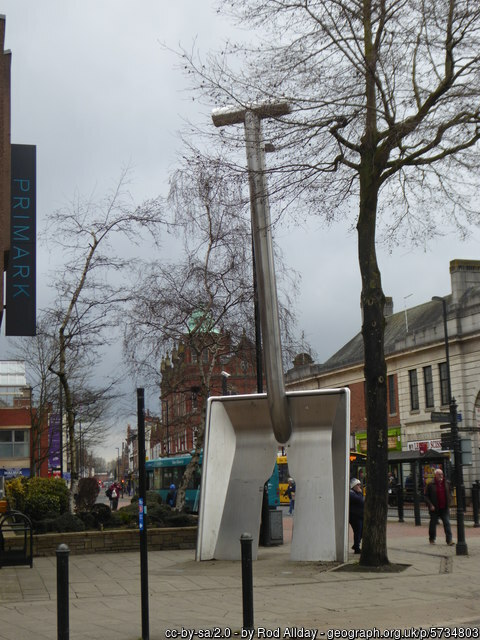
- Artist: Andrew Hazell
- Year: 2001
- Location: 52°48′04.2″N 01°37′52.7″W

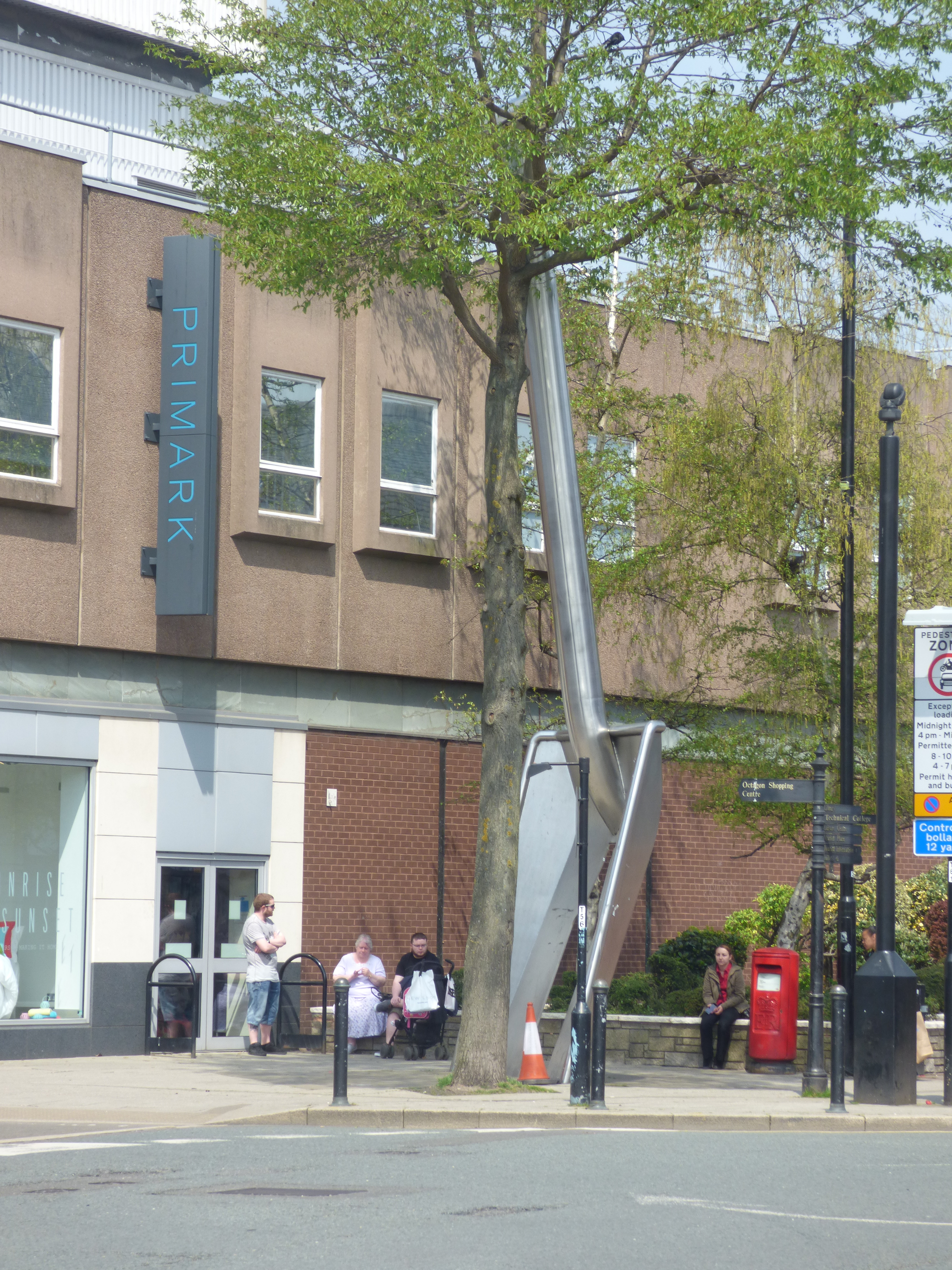
Side view

The Malt Shovel is a 2001 sculpture by Andrew Hazell that stands on the corner of High Street and New Street in Burton upon Trent in England. It was commissioned by East Staffordshire Borough Council in 1998 and funded by a National Lottery grant. The sculpture is a representation of a shovel used for malting, part of the brewery process that dominated the town's history. The stainless-steel sculpture stands 9 metres (30 ft) tall and has a bottle-shaped opening in the blade through which people can walk. The sculpture was unveiled amid local controversy over its accuracy and site.

== History and description ==
The sculpture was commissioned by East Staffordshire Borough Council (ESBC) to stand in Burton upon Trent. A brief was advertised nationally in April 1998 and the local authority received 70 responses, from which a shortlist of eight were selected to provide detailed proposals. The sculptor Andrew Hazell was selected to produce the sculpture. It is intended to represent a shovel used to turn grain during malting, part of the brewing process that dominated the town's industry. The shovel is rendered in stainless steel, which is often used in the modern brewing process, and stands 9 metres (30 ft) high. A 2.75-metre (9.0 ft) opening, shaped like a beer bottle, is cut into the blade of the shovel which allows people to walk through the sculpture. The sculpture cost £45,000 and was funded by a National Lottery grant. It was installed at the junction of High Street and New Street on 14 October 2001.

== Reception ==
Hazell was inspired by pop art and particularly the work of Claes Oldenburg, who creates large-scale sculptures of everyday objects. Noszlopy and Waterhouse, writing in 2005, interpreted the Malt Shovel as "an ironic comment on the local heritage industry", which they considered to be focussed on the history of brewing, similar to how Oldenburg satirised capitalism with his sculptures of consumer goods. They also compared the sculpture to Hazell's Fallen Star, a large-scale representation of a light bulb in Bradford that ironically represented the early stars of cinema, long since dead, who are remembered at the town's National Museum of Film and Photography.

The sculpture was controversial locally. It was opposed by the Burton Civic Society, who raised concerns on the grounds of road safety, because of the sculpture's potential to dazzle and distract motorists, and its potential to hinder the passage of pedestrians. Opposition to the sculpture from local people also featured in the Burton Mail where some objected to the sculpture's proximity to the town's war memorial and some questioned the accuracy of the sculpture. Some former maltsters claimed that the sculpture more closely resembled a scoop than a malt shovel, which was completely flat. One, who had worked at the Bass Brewery in the 1950s, described it as "an insult to all former maltsters". A Burton Mail poll found 116 of 120 respondents were opposed to the sculpture. The newspaper's editor declined an invitation to attend the unveiling of the sculpture "as a matter of principle". Noszlopy and Waterhouse claimed that none of the opponents of the sculpture noticed its ironical intent.
