= Thomas Fairfax (priest) =

Scottish Anglican Archdeacon in Ireland

Thomas Fairfax was an Anglican Archdeacon in Ireland in the 17th century.

Fairfax was the Rector of Clones. He was Treasurer of Dromore from 1635 to 1638; and Archdeacon of Clogher from 1638 until his death on 16 March 1641. Fairfax is buried at St. Michan's Church, Dublin.
