= Our Lady and St Benedict's Church, Ampleforth =

Church in Ampleforth, North Yorkshire, England

Coordinates: 54°12′03″N 1°06′20″W

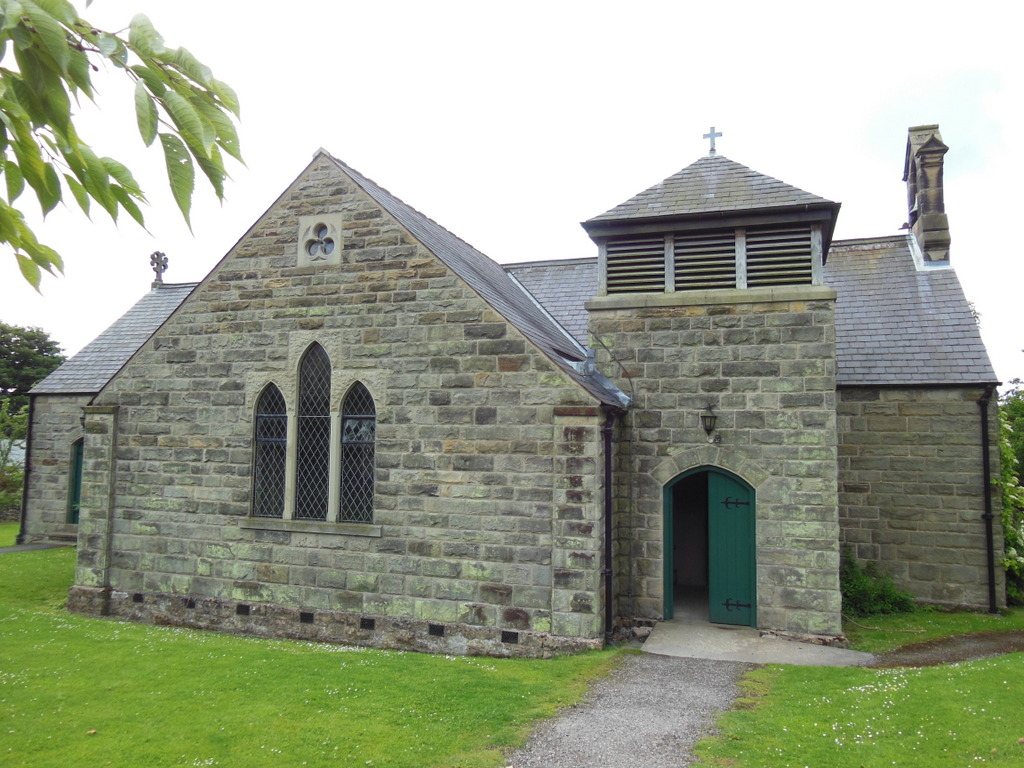
The church, in 2013

Our Lady and St Benedict's Church is a Catholic parish church in Ampleforth, a village in North Yorkshire, in England.

The church was constructed by Ampleforth Abbey, to serve the local village. It originally consisted of a continuous nave and chancel, with a sacristry behind. It was dedicated on 17 May 1907, and it was reordered and extended in 1988. This entailed the addition of transepts and two low towers, on the north and south sides.

The church is in the Gothic Revival style. It is built of local stone and has a slate roof. The two towers have louvered upper stages and pyramidal roofs. The main entrance is through a porch in the north tower. Inside, there is a large painting over the original high altar, depicting Christ, Mary, and various saints. It was painted by a novice at the abbey in 1916. Various original furnishings survive, including doors, pews, panelling, a reredos and an oak lectern by Robert Thompson. An oak screen near the west end of the church creates a narthex. There are two stained glass windows in the chancel, designed in 1933 by Morris Meredith Williams. In the churchyard is a wooden cross, made by Thompson in 1919.
