= The Malt Shovel =

Pub in Oswaldkirk, North Yorkshire, England

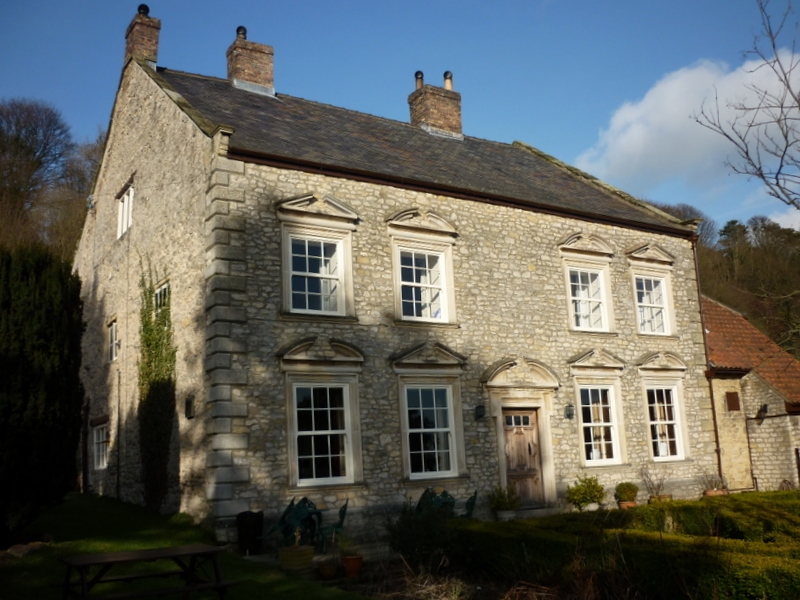
The pub, in 2011

The Malt Shovel is a historic pub in Oswaldkirk, a village in North Yorkshire, in England.

The pub was built as a house, probably in the 17th century. In about 1700, the facade was rebuilt. It was renovated in the 20th century, and a two-storey extension was added. The building was grade II listed in 1955. In 2018, it was owned by Samuel Smith's Old Brewery, at which time it was proposed to demolish the extension and add a single-storey replacement, and modify the snug, kitchens, toilets and accommodation.

The pub is built of limestone on a plinth, with rusticated quoins, and a stone slate roof with gable coping. The garden front has two storeys and five bays. The central doorway has an eared architrave, and a broken segmental pediment containing a coat of arms. The windows are sashes in architraves, with pulvinated friezes, and broken pediments, alternately segmental and plain. The end gable contains a mullioned window.

== See also ==
- Listed buildings in Oswaldkirk
