= Gilling East =

Village and civil parish in North Yorkshire, England

Coordinates: 54.184380°N 1.059430°W

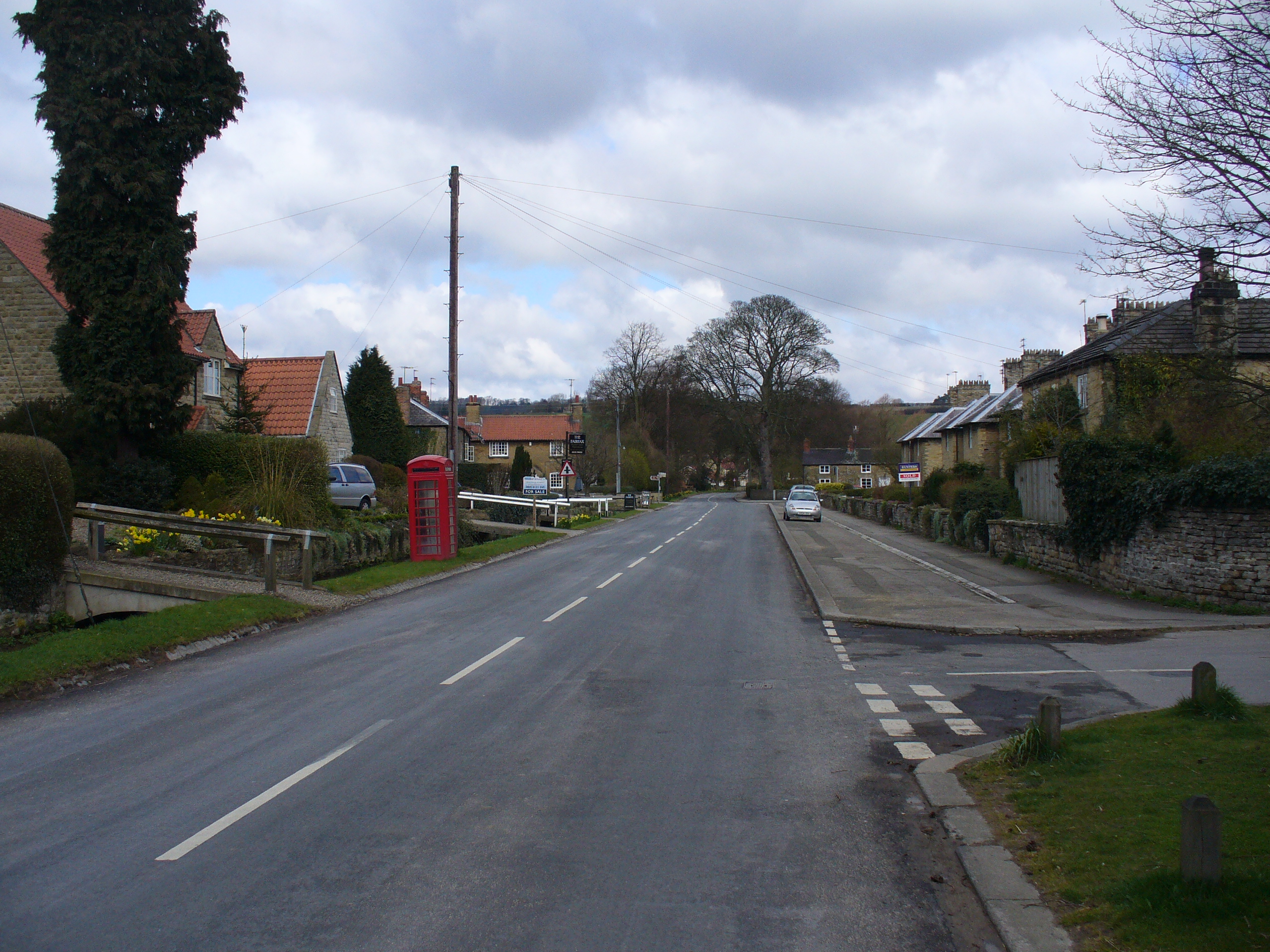
- Gilling East

- Location within North Yorkshire
- Population: 345 (2011 census)
- OS grid reference: SE614769
- Civil parish: Gilling East
- Unitary authority: North Yorkshire
- Ceremonial county: North Yorkshire
- Region: Yorkshire and the Humber
- Country: England
- Sovereign state: United Kingdom
- Post town: YORK
- Postcode district: YO62
- Police: North Yorkshire
- Fire: North Yorkshire
- Ambulance: Yorkshire
- UK Parliament: Thirsk and Malton

Gilling East is a village and civil parish in North Yorkshire, England, on the main B1363 road between York and Helmsley, 2 miles (3.2 km) south of Oswaldkirk and 5 miles (8 km) south of Helmsley. It is named "East" to distinguish it from Gilling West near Richmond, some 32 miles (51 km) away. It had a population of 321 at the 2001 Census, which had risen to 345 at the 2011 census. In 2015, North Yorkshire County Council estimated the population to be 360. The village lies in the Howardian Hills just south of the North York Moors National Park and close to Ampleforth Abbey and College.

It was part of the Ryedale district between 1974 and 2023. It is now administered by North Yorkshire Council.

== History ==
The name Gilling derives from the Old English Getlaingas meaning 'the people of Getla'.

The village is mentioned in the Domesday Book as Ghillinge, and was previously in the wapentake of Ryedale, not the Wapentake of Gilling East, which was later in Richmondshire.

Gilling Castle is on a hill overlooking the village. It began as a towerhouse built by Thomas Etton sometime in the fourteenth century. In 1492, it passed to the Fairfax family and remained in their hands until 1793. Most of the castle we see today dates from their period of occupancy. The village used to have a railway station on the Thirsk and Malton railway, which opened in 1853. A second railway branching north from Gilling railway station went through Helmsley and then east to Pickering. The station was closed to passengers in 1953, and closed to goods traffic in 1964.

The local pub, the Fairfax Arms, is at the base of a hill which leads up the drive to Gilling Castle, formerly St Martins Ampleforth, the Prep School for Ampleforth College. The Anglican church in the village is Holy Cross.

There is also a miniature railway in the village operated by the Ryedale Society of Model Engineers. The RSME railway and club house share the site of the old school, now refurbished as Gilling East Village Hall, on Pottergate, a narrow road running west from the main road alongside the Fairfax Arms.

== See also ==
- Listed buildings in Gilling East
