= Ampleforth =

Village and civil parish in North Yorkshire, England

Coordinates: 54°11′57″N 1°06′24″W

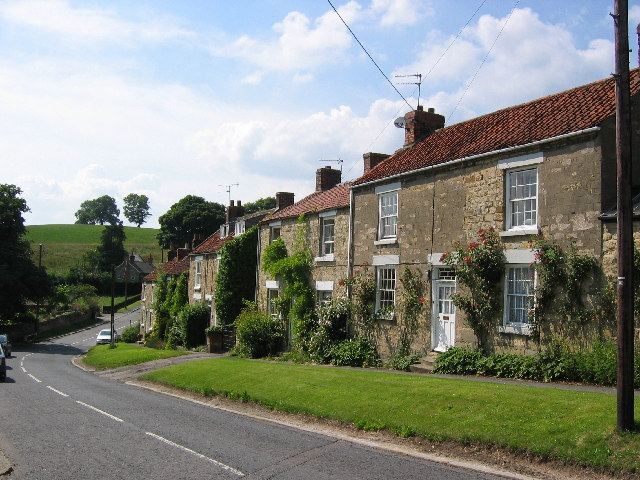
- Ampleforth

- Location within North Yorkshire
- Population: 1,345 (2011 census)
- OS grid reference: SE582787
- Unitary authority: North Yorkshire
- Ceremonial county: North Yorkshire
- Region: Yorkshire and the Humber
- Country: England
- Sovereign state: United Kingdom
- Post town: YORK
- Postcode district: YO62
- Dialling code: 01439
- Police: North Yorkshire
- Fire: North Yorkshire
- Ambulance: Yorkshire
- UK Parliament: Thirsk and Malton

Ampleforth is a village and civil parish in North Yorkshire, England, 20 miles (32 km) north of York. The village is situated on the edge of the North York Moors National Park. The parish has a population of 883 according to the 2001 census, increasing to 1,345 at the 2011 Census, and includes Ampleforth College. The name Ampleforth means "the ford where the sorrel grows".

== History ==
The Ryedale Roman Bronzes, a ritual Roman metalwork assemblage, was found by two metal detectorists in a field near Ampleforth in May 2020.

Ampleforth is mentioned in the Domesday Book as belonging to the Archbishop of York, but that the land was possibly waste. The name ‘Ampleforth’ derives from a combination of the Old English words ampre (sorrel) and ford meaning ‘(place by) ford where sorrel grew.’

Until immediately after the Second World War Ampleforth mainly consisted of houses built along the main road which serves as the principal thoroughfare. Here there are several buildings dating back to the 19th century including the village's shop and the adjoining Coram Cottage, constructed in 1856.

After the Second World War the village began to spread southwards and further east along what now are called Mill Lane and East Lane. At the southern end of the village there is a former council estate constructed in the 1960s which formed the greatest part of the development. Construction of new houses continues today. Along East Lane small farms are gradually being developed into large homes so that the rural and residential split becomes less marked.

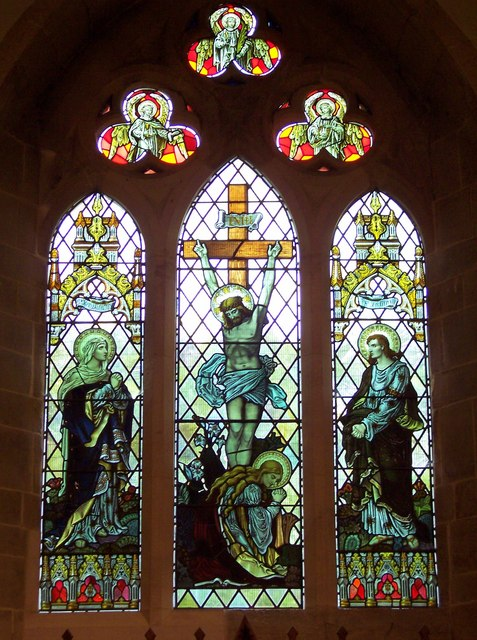
Stained glass window from St Hilda's Church depicting the Crucifixion

St Hilda's Church, Ampleforth, the Church of England parish church, is dedicated to St Hilda, an English abbess who founded Whitby Abbey. The church dates back to Saxon times, with elements from the 13th century. Attached to the church is a primary school run jointly by the Church of England and the North Yorkshire County Council Education service which was judged to be good in Ofsted reports from 2011, 2016 and 2020.

Ampleforth Abbey is only 1 mile (1.6 km) away. Our Lady and St Benedict's Church is served by the monks of Ampleforth and has been the parish church for the village's Catholic population for many decades, often being considered a chapel-of-ease to the farmers of the area. Attached to the Roman Catholic parish is the co-educational primary school, St Benedict's, which is run by the Diocese of Middlesbrough as a systemic school.

There are two public houses in the village, the White Swan and the White Horse. The latter takes its name from the large white horse which was carved into the hillside a few miles to the west.

Ampleforth had a Quaker settlement on the edge of the village, in Shallowdale to the west. The 16th century Carr House Farm was occupied by flax workers to weave flax into linen.

The village was the setting of the Ampleforth Sword Dance, traditionally held at Christmas. The dance was of a Long Sword type which had the back story of a traveller killed by the six swordsmen and when a doctor is called for to revive the dead traveller, a clown pushes him aside and brings the traveller back to life through his mystical moves. Cecil Sharp documented the dance in his book, The Sword Dances of Northern England, and he is credited with finding the last surviving man to have taken part in the dance (as the clown).

The village used to have a railway station on the Thirsk and Malton Line that was 1.5 miles (2.4 km) south of Ampleforth. Services ran between York and Pickering from the 1930s onwards and the station closed in 1950, some years before the rest of the line did to passengers.

== Governance ==
An electoral ward in the same name exists. This ward stretches south-east to Coulton with a total population taken at the 2011 census of 2,153.

The village was part of the Ryedale district between 1974 and 2023. It is now administered by the unitary North Yorkshire Council.

== See also ==
- Listed buildings in Ampleforth
