= Gilling Castle =

Grade I listed castle in North Yorkshire, England

Coordinates: 54.18335°N 1.06527°W

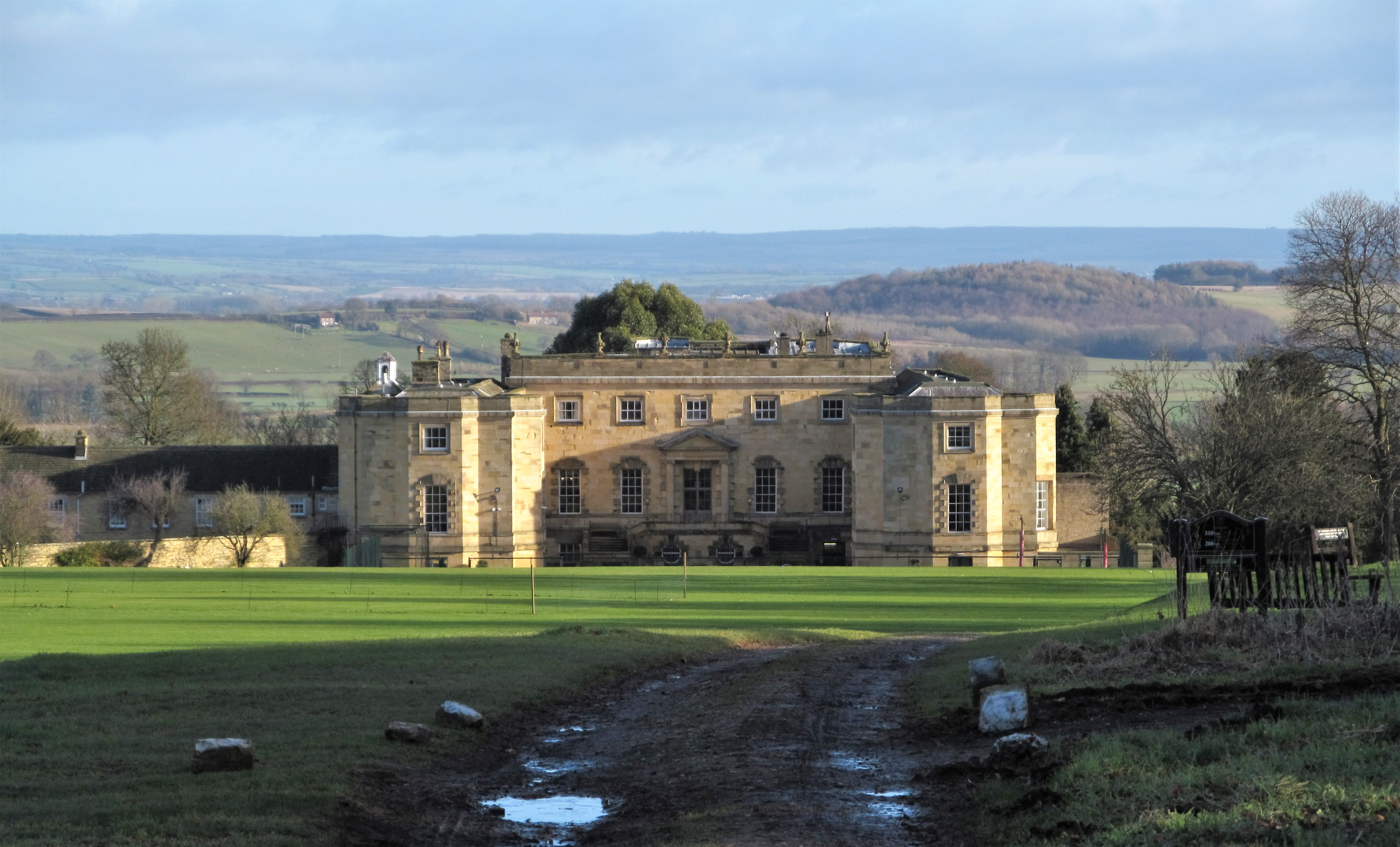
The castle, in 2018

Gilling Castle is a Grade I listed country house near Gilling East, North Yorkshire, England (grid reference SE611768).

== History ==
The castle was originally the home of the Etton family, who appeared there at the end of the 12th century. It was Thomas de Etton who built the fortified manor house in the 14th century – a large tower almost square, whose basement still forms the core of the present building. In 1349 his father had settled the manor of Gilling on his wife's family, the Fairfaxes, in the event of the failure of the Ettons to produce a male heir. Thus, Thomas Fairfax was able to claim the property in 1489, and it was his great-grandson, Sir William Fairfax, who succeeded in 1571, and undertook the rebuilding of the old 14th-century house. Building on top of the medieval walls and leaving the ground floor intact, he rebuilt the first and second floors, adding at the back (east) a staircase turret and an oriel window. The Great Chamber was also built at this time.

At the beginning of the 18th century, the owner, now Viscount Fairfax of Emley, remodelled much of the interior of the house and added the wings enclosing the front (west) court. Though this work has often been attributed to John Vanbrugh or James Gibbs, an attribution to the Yorkshire gentleman architect William Wakefield (died 1730), is based on a written note by Francis Drake. Minor alterations were made in the 1750s by John Carr, who was engaged in remodelling the interior of the prominent Fairfax seat in York, Fairfax House, in Castlegate.

On the death of Mrs Barnes (Lavinia Fairfax) in 1885, this branch of the family became extinct and the castle, after passing through several hands, was bought by Ampleforth Abbey in 1929.

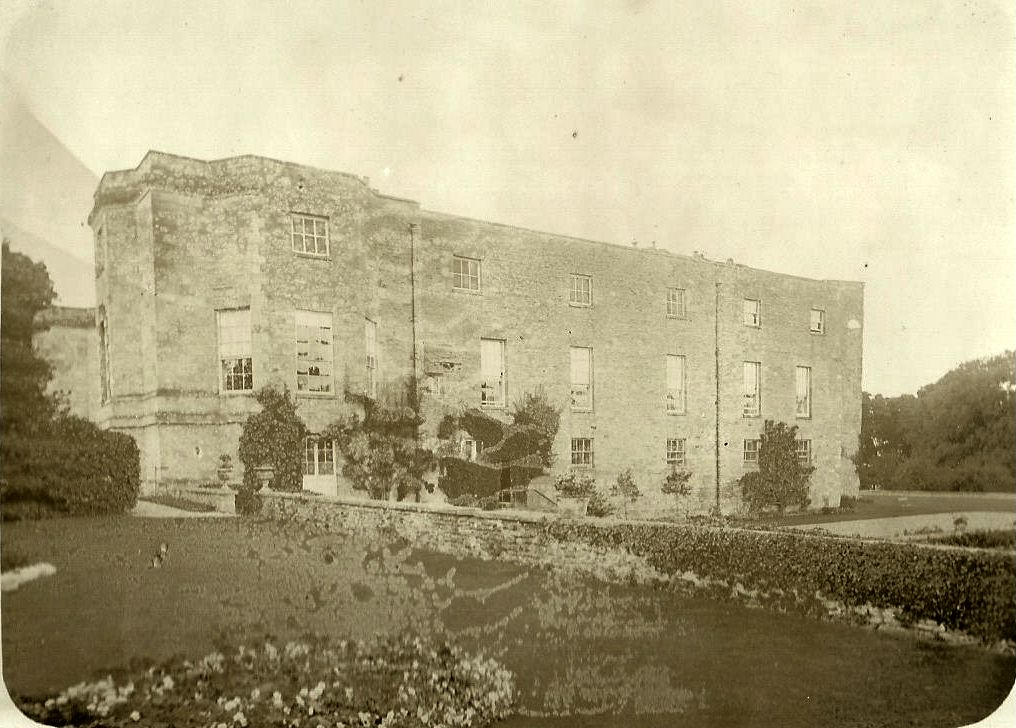
Gilling Castle before 1939

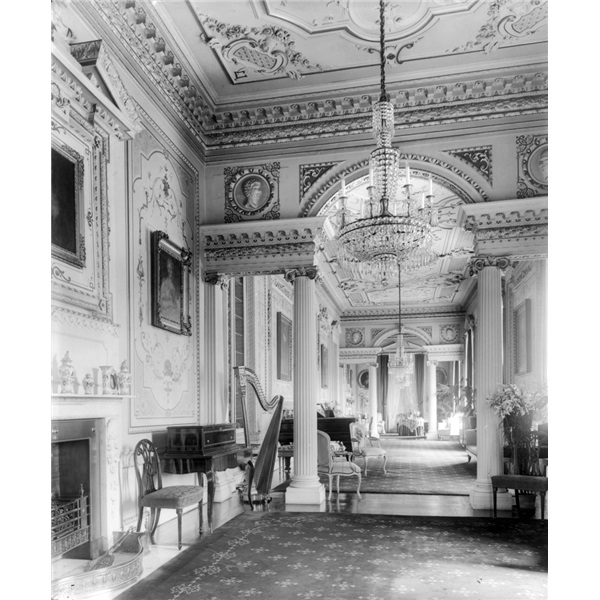
Gilling Castle showing its 18th-century interior, photographed 1909

Until 2018 the castle was home to St Martin's Ampleforth, the prep school for Ampleforth College. The castle is also designated a Grade I listed building. Grade II listed components include the former clock tower, stables and stone gate piers.

In 2022, the entire property was listed for sale by the Ampleforth Abbey trustees; by that time, the castle had been vacant for four years. A previous plan (2021) to convert the property into holiday accommodation and an activity camp had failed because the Abbey had not sought planning consent from Ryedale Council for this revised usage.

== The Great Chamber ==
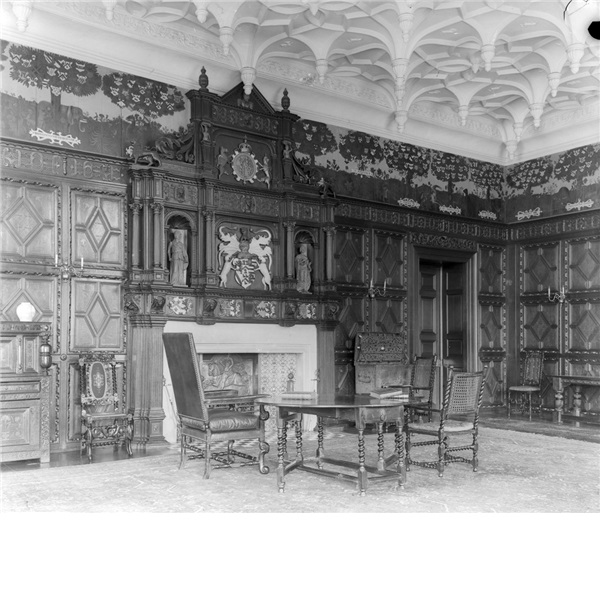
Great Chamber, 1908

The Great Chamber is the principal room of the house as rebuilt by Sir William Fairfax, who held Gilling from 1571 to 1597. It survived the 18th century rebuilding almost unaltered and is a remarkable example of the richness and elaboration of a late Elizabethan interior. Sir William was keenly interested to demonstrate in heraldry his connections in Yorkshire, and he used it to decorate the newly built room, to such an extent that in the 1590s, inventories show, there was a book to which visitors could refer in order to identify the arms in plaster, paint and glass. The glass has the signature of a Flemish artist and the date, 1585, which suggests that the room and its decorations were completed that year.

The room is wainscoted in English oak divided in height into three large panels in the four corners. The lozenges are filled with interlacing geometrical patterns in ebony and holly. Each one is different and there are nearly a hundred round the room. Each triangular panel is inlaid with a flower.

The chimneypiece has the Fairfax achievement of arms in the centre panel. Above are the arms of Queen Elizabeth I. The chimney breast above the fireplace has four coats of arms - of Sir William's four sisters and their husbands (Bellasis, Curwen, Vavasour, and Roos, each impaling Fairfax).

Above the wainscoting runs a frieze, painted on boards, displaying the arms of the gentlemen of Yorkshire. They are arranged in twenty-one Wapentakes. To each Wapentake is given a tree and the coats of all gentlemen then living in that district are hung on its branches.

Sir William carried on his heraldic decoration in the painted glass, which is the finest part of the Great Chamber. The south window, which alone survives almost intact, is devoted to the heraldry and genealogy of his second wife's family, the Stapletons. The bay window has suffered, and the first row of lights was reglazed with clear glass, probably in the 18th century. This window shows the story of the Fairfax family. These two windows are the work of Bernard Dininckoff, who has left his signature, with the date 1585 and a tiny portrait of himself, in the bottom right-hand light of the south window. The third (east) window has also lost its lower lights and is by a different artist, slightly later in date. It shows the story of the Constable family. For Sir William's only son, Thomas (afterwards the first Viscount Fairfax), married Catharine Constable of Burton Constable.

The ribbed plaster ceiling with its fans and pendants completed the room. Once again Sir William's enthusiasm for heraldry finds its place, for the grounds of the panels formed by the ribs are decorated with lions (Fairfax coat), and goats and talbots (the Fairfax and Stapleton supporters).

== Preservation ==
In 1930, William Randolph Hearst purchased the interior components and fittings of the Great Chamber, except for the ceiling. They were stripped and packed for shipment to St Donat's Castle where they were to be installed. That plan did not come to fruition and the interior remained in storage. It was later re-purchased with the help of the Pilgrim Trust, the York Elizabethan Society and other donors. In 1952, it was re-installed at Gilling Castle.

Panelling from the Long Gallery, which had a ceiling by the stuccoist Giuseppe Cortese, was salvaged and sent to the Bowes Museum where components of it are permanently displayed.

== See also ==
- Grade I listed buildings in North Yorkshire (district)
- Listed buildings in Gilling East
