= Robert Hilton =

Robert Hilton may refer to:

- Robert Hilton of Swine & Winestead, MP for Yorkshire (UK Parliament constituency) in 1339
- Robert Hilton (15th century MP) (died 1431), MP for Lincolnshire in 1416 and Yorkshire in 1419
- Robert Benjamin Hilton (1821–1894), American lawyer and politician
- Bob Hilton (born 1943), American television personality

== See also ==
- Several Robert Hyltons, of the Baron Hylton
