= Richard Redman =

Richard Redman may refer to:

- Richard Redman (speaker) (died 1426), Speaker of the House of Commons for the Parliament of 1415
- Richard Redman (bishop) (died 1505), successively Bishop of Exeter and Ely and great-grandson of the above
- Rick Redman (born 1943), retired American football linebacker
