= John Langton =

John Langton may refer to:

- John Langton (bishop of Chichester) (died 1337), chancellor of England and bishop of Chichester
- John Langton (15th century MP) for Yorkshire
- John Langton (bishop of St Davids) (died 1447), bishop of St Davids and chancellor of the University of Cambridge
- John Langton (Canadian politician) (1808–1894), Canadian businessman, political figure and civil servant

== See also ==
- John Langton Sanford (1824–1877), English historical writer
