= Edmund Hastings =

Edmund Hastings may refer to:

- Edmund Hastings, 1st Baron Hastings
- Edmund Hastings (MP) for Yorkshire and Northumberland
