= Buckton Mill =

Historic windmill in the East Riding of Yorkshire, England

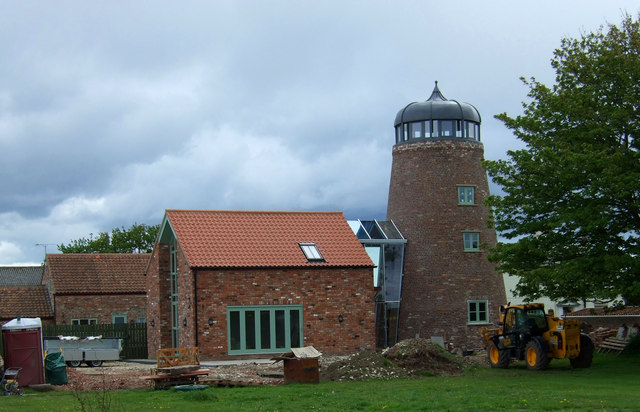
- The building in 2015

- Location within East Riding of Yorkshire
- Alternative names: Bempton Mill

General information
- Status: Converted to residential
- Type: Windmill
- Location: Bolam Lane, Bempton, East Riding of Yorkshire, England
- Coordinates: 54°07′36″N 0°11′45″W
- Year built: Early 19th century
- Renovated: 2010s (restored)

Listed Building – Grade II
- Official name: Bempton Mill
- Designated: 2 January 1985
- Reference no.: 1346620

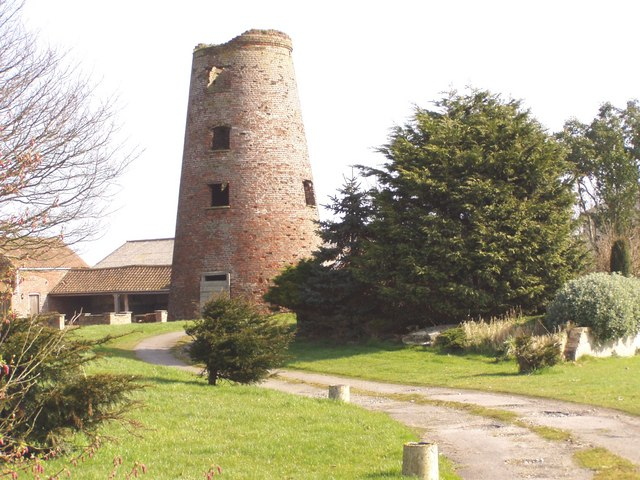
The building in 2009

Buckton Mill, also known as Bempton Mill, is a historic windmill on Bolam Lane in Bempton, a village in the East Riding of Yorkshire, England.

A corn mill on the site was first recorded in the 13th century. The current building was constructed in the early 19th century. The building was Grade II listed in 1985. The building became derelict, but was restored in the 2010s and converted into a private house.

The mill is built of brick, with stone dressings and a stepped brick parapet. It consists of a conical tower of four storeys, and contains windows, some with segmental arches, and two doorways.

== See also ==
- Listed buildings in Bempton
