= Henry Lascelles, 2nd Earl of Harewood =

British peer, Tory politician, planter and art collector

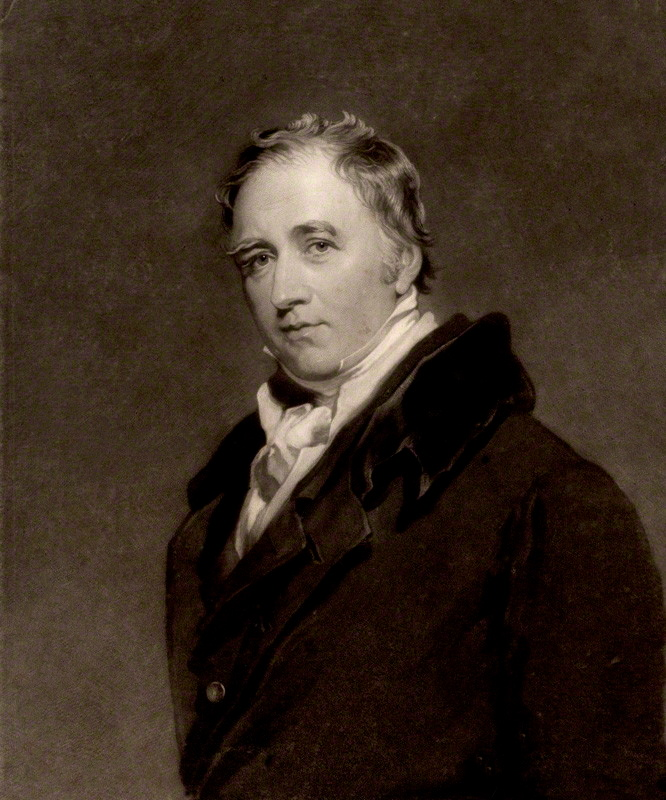
The Earl of Harewood

Henry Lascelles, 2nd Earl of Harewood DL (25 December 1767 – 24 November 1841), known as Viscount Lascelles from 1814 to 1820, was a British peer, Tory politician, planter and art collector.

== Early life and politics ==
Harewood was the second son of Edward Lascelles, 1st Earl of Harewood, and Anne Chaloner. He was elected to the House of Commons for Yorkshire in 1796, a seat he held until 1806, when he chose not to force a very expensive contested election. He tried and failed to regain it in the 1807 Yorkshire election. Then held it again from 1812 to 1818, and also represented Westbury from 1807 to 1812 and Northallerton from 1818 to 1820. The latter year he succeeded his father in the earldom and entered the House of Lords. Between 1819 and 1841 he also served as Lord Lieutenant of the West Riding of Yorkshire.

According to the Legacies of British Slave-Ownership at University College London, Harewood was awarded remuneration as a former slave trader in the aftermath of the Slavery Abolition Act 1833 via the Slave Compensation Act 1837. The British Government took out a £15 million loan (worth £1.8 billion in 2023) with interest from Nathan Mayer Rothschild and Moses Montefiore, which was subsequently paid off by British taxpayers (ending in 2015). Harewood was associated with six different claims; he enslaved roughly 1,277 people in Barbados and Jamaica and received a payment of £26,307 at the time (worth £3.15 million in 2023).

== Marriage and issue ==
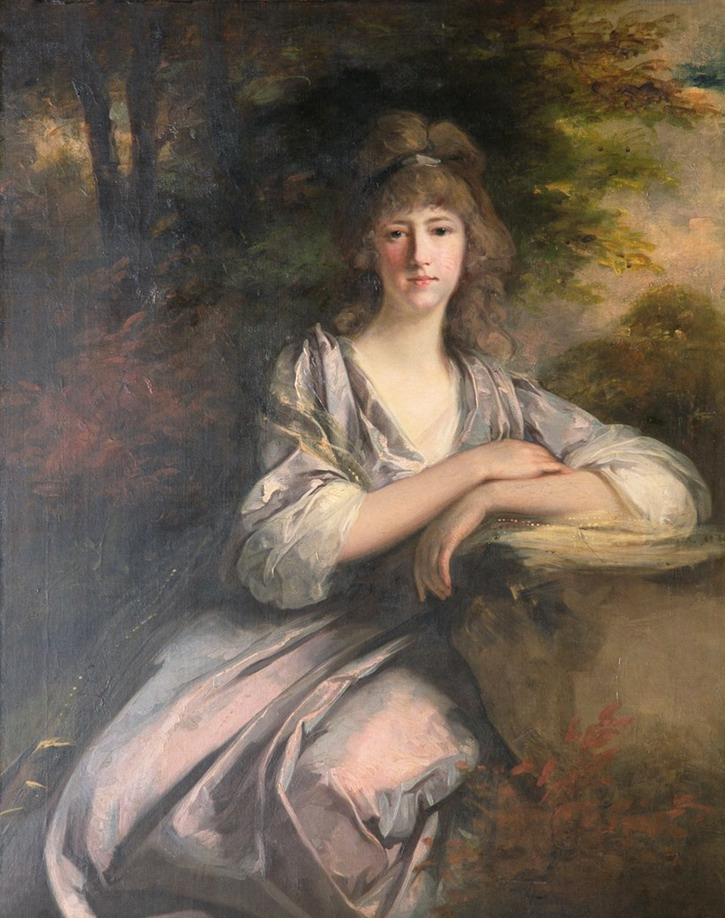
Henrietta, Lady Harewood by John Hoppner, 1780s

Lord Harewood married Henrietta Sebright (d. 15 February 1840), daughter of Sir John Sebright, 6th Baronet, on 3 September 1794. They had eleven children:

- Edward Lascelles, Viscount Lascelles (18 Jul 1796 – 7 Dec 1839), married (1) Ann Elizabeth Rosser, (2) Philippine Munster and died without issue.
- Henry Lascelles, 3rd Earl of Harewood (11 Jun 1797 – 22 Feb 1857)
- William Saunders Sebright Lascelles (29 Oct 1798 – 2 Jul 1851)
- Edwin Lascelles (1799 – 25 Apr 1865), died unmarried.
- Francis Lascelles (12 Feb 1801 – 2 Feb 1814)
- Lady Harriet Lascelles (19 Jun 1802 – 1 Jan 1889), married George Holroyd, 2nd Earl of Sheffield, and had issue.
- Frederick Lascelles (1803 – 13 Oct 1823)
- Lady Frances Anne Lascelles ( 2 Jun 1804 – 7 Dec 1855), married John Thomas Hope, son of General Sir Alexander Hope and had issue.
- Arthur Lascelles (23 Jan 1807 – 19 Jul 1880), married Caroline Frances Brooke, daughter of Richard Brooke, 6th Baronet and had issue.
- Lady Emma Lascelles (16 Mar 1809 – 8 Feb 1865), married Edward Portman, 1st Viscount Portman and had issue.
- Lady Louisa Lascelles (10 Sep 1812 – 10 Mar 1886), married Lord George Henry Cavendish, younger brother of William Cavendish, 7th Duke of Devonshire, and had issue.

His wife is mentioned in Mansfield Park, by Jane Austen, in a letter from Mary Crawford to Fanny Price while Fanny is staying with her mother and father in Portsmouth: "I was there, two years ago, when Lady Lascelles had it, and I prefer it over any other house in London." (She is talking about a house in Wimpole Street.)

== Notes ==
Parliament of Great Britain
Preceded by Henry Duncombe; William Wilberforce	Member of Parliament for Yorkshire; 1796–1800; With: William Wilberforce	Succeeded by Parliament of the United Kingdom
Parliament of the United Kingdom
Preceded by Parliament of Great Britain	Member of Parliament for Yorkshire; 1801–1806; With: William Wilberforce	Succeeded by William Wilberforce; Walter Ramsden Fawkes
Preceded by Edward Lascelles; Glynn Wynn	Member of Parliament for Westbury; 1807–1812; With: Glynn Wynn 1807–1809; Francis Whittle 1809–1810; John de Ponthieu 1810–1812	Succeeded by Benjamin Hall; Benjamin Shaw
Preceded by William Wilberforce; Viscount Milton	Member of Parliament for Yorkshire; 1812–1818; With: Viscount Milton	Succeeded by Viscount Milton; James Stuart-Wortley-Mackenzie
Preceded by Robert Pemberton Milnes; Viscount Pollington	Member of Parliament for Pontefract; 1812; With: Robert Pemberton Milnes	Succeeded by Robert Pemberton Milnes; Viscount Pollington
Preceded by Henry Peirse; John Bacon Sawrey Morritt	Member of Parliament for Northallerton; 1818–1820; With: Henry Peirse	Succeeded by Henry Peirse; William Lascelles
Honorary titles
Preceded by The Earl FitzWilliam	Lord Lieutenant of the West Riding of Yorkshire; 1819–1841	Succeeded by The Lord Wharncliffe
Peerage of the United Kingdom
Preceded by Edward Lascelles	Earl of Harewood; 1820–1841	Succeeded by Henry Lascelles
