= Sir Miles Stapylton, 4th Baronet =

British landowner and politician

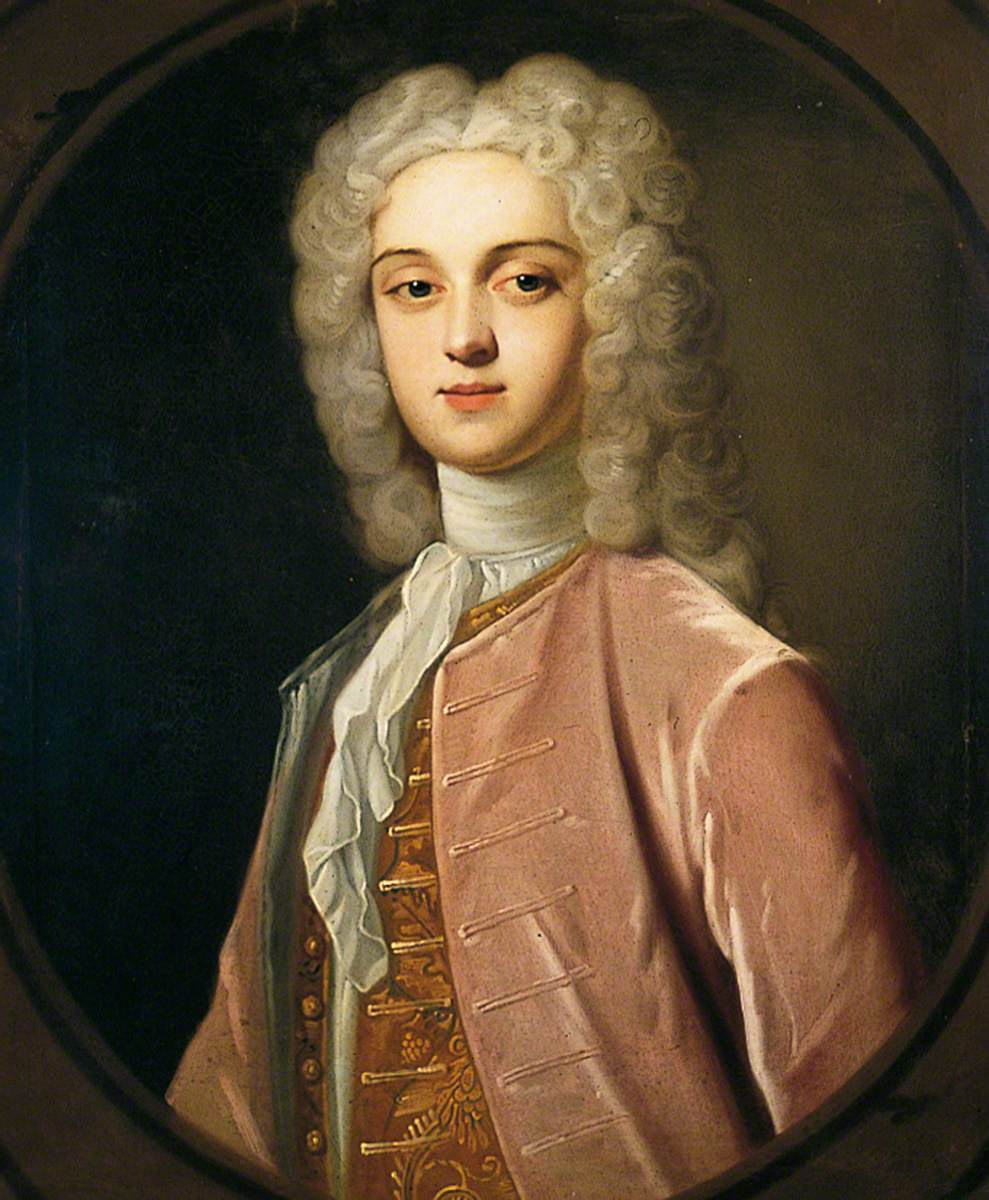
- Died: 14 May 1752 (in Julian calendar)
- Occupation: Politician
- Parent(s): John Stapylton

Sir Miles Stapylton 4th Baronet (c. 1708–1752), of Myton, Yorkshire, was a British landowner and politician who sat in the House of Commons from 1734 to 1750. He was initially a Tory but after joining the Prince of Wales party in the mid 1740s, went over to the Whigs.

== Early life ==
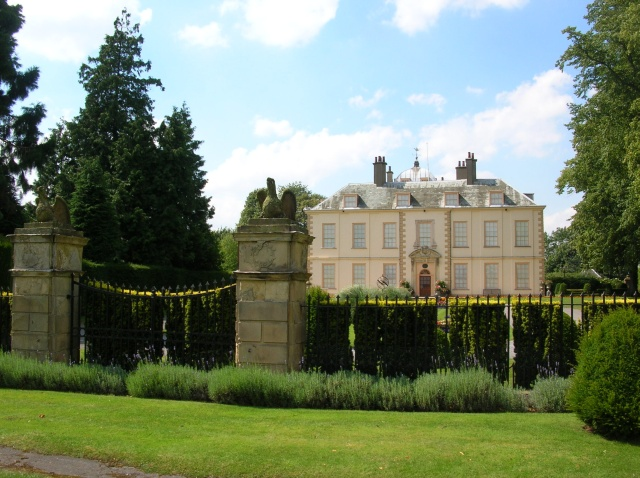
Myton Hall

Stapylton was the eldest son of Sir John Stapylton, 3rd Baronet MP, and his wife Mary Sandys, daughter of Frances Sandys of Scroby, Nottinghamshire. He was educated at Westminster School in 1724, and matriculated at University College, Oxford on 16 November 1726, aged 18. He succeeded to the baronetcy on 25 October 1733 when his father was killed by a fall from his horse on the way to attend a parliamentary adoption meeting at York. In May 1738, he married Ann Waller, daughter of Edmund Waller,

== Career ==
After his father's accident. Staplyton was adopted in his stead as the Tory candidate for Yorkshire at the 1734 British general election He was returned as Member of Parliament, topping the poll, after a bitter and expensive contest. At the 1741 British general election, he was returned again for Yorkshire, unopposed. After the fall of Walpole in 1742, he followed his father-in-law, Edmund Waller, and voted with him against the Government on the Hanoverians in 1742 and 1744, His only recorded speech was on 1 February 1744, when he moved to address the King for all letters and papers relating to the treaty of Worms and the treaty with Prussia. He briefly joined the Prince of Wales party, and according to 2nd Lord Egmont's list of people to receive office on Frederick's accession, he was marked as a lord of the Treasury. In 1746, he voted for the government on the Hanoverians as a ‘New Ally’. He was returned unopposed again for Yorkshire at the 1747 British general election. Towards the end of 1749 he went over to the Government when he sought a government place to ease him from the trouble and expense of Parliament. In April 1750, he was appointed a commissioner of customs, and had to vacate his seat, which was filled on his recommendation by Henry Pleydell Dawnay, 3rd Viscount Downe who had also converted from the Tories.

== Death and legacy ==
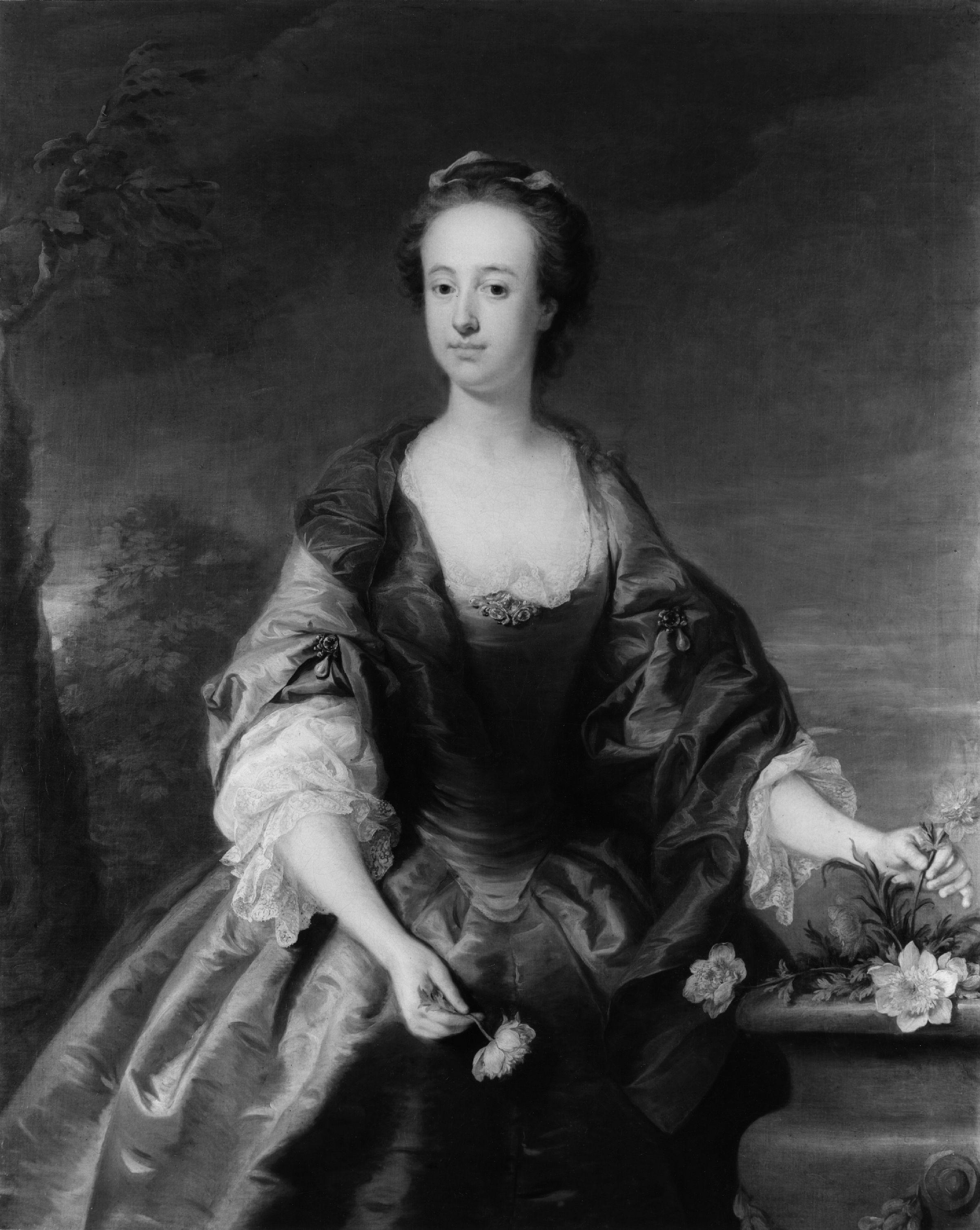
Anne (née Waller), Lady Stapylton by Andrea Soldi

Stapylton died on 14 May 1752 and was buried at Bath Abbey on 18 May, leaving one daughter. He was succeeded in the baronetcy by his brother Bryan. His widow Ann died on 13 November 1791 at Wimpole Street.

Parliament of Great Britain
Preceded by Sir George Savile, Bt; Cholmley Turner	Member of Parliament for Yorkshire; 1734–1750; With: Cholmley Turner 1734–1741; Charles Howard 1741–1742; Cholmley Turner 1742–1747; Sir Conyers Darcy 1747–1750	Succeeded by Henry Dawnay; Sir Conyers Darcy
Baronetage of England
Preceded by John Stapylton	Baronet (of Myton); 1733–1752	Succeeded by Brian Stapylton
