= Charles Fitzwilliam =

Charles Fitzwilliam may refer to:

- Charles Fitzwilliam, 3rd Earl Fitzwilliam
- Charles Fitzwilliam, 5th Earl Fitzwilliam

== See also ==
- Charles Wentworth-Fitzwilliam (disambiguation)
