= Sir Peter Buckton =

Member of the Parliament of England

- Born: 1350; Buckton, Yorkshire
- Died: 4 March 1414 (aged 64)
- Spouse: Cecilia
- Children: Peter, Ralph and William

Sir Peter Buckton (1350 – 4 March 1414) was an English politician, soldier and knight from the eponymous village of Buckton near the town of Bridlington in Yorkshire. He was the High Sheriff of Yorkshire for the year 1404 and was also a member of parliament for Yorkshire three times. In the latter years of his life he also held significant positions such as the Mayor of Bordeaux and Ambassador to Castile.

He was a supporter and friend of Henry IV of England, before and after he became king. Present with him on crusades to Lithuania and Jerusalem as well as helping him land at Ravenspur, Holderness after which Henry went on to become king.

== Biography ==
=== Caroline War and Crusades ===
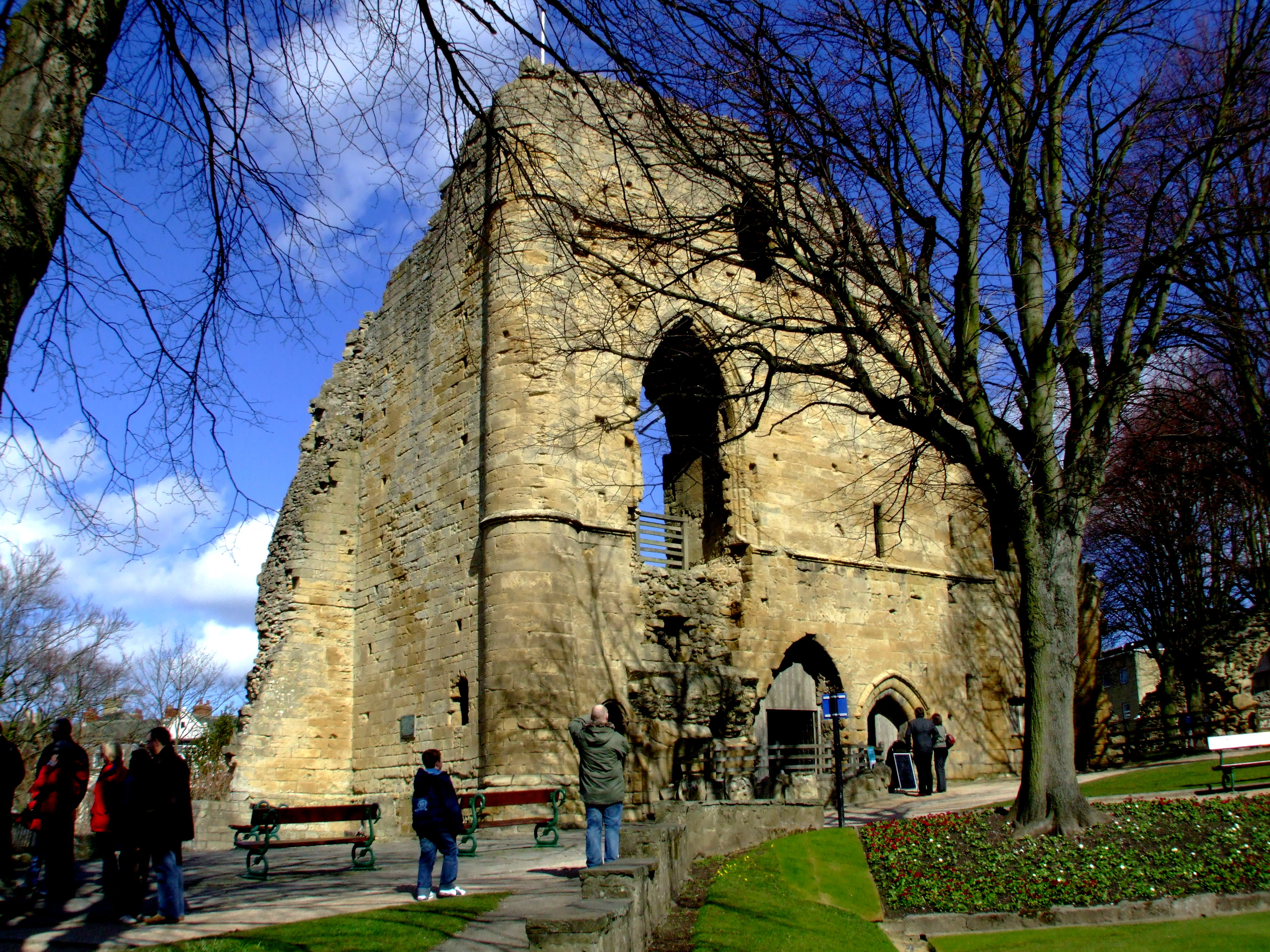
Knaresborough Castle

Peter Buckton's family had been Lord of the manor at Buckton in Holderness, owning large property as early as 1290. The family was known locally for giving generously to the churches of the area. Buckton first gained notoriety fighting under the House of Plantagenet in 1369, specifically John of Gaunt and Thomas of Woodstock during the Caroline War part of the Hundred Years' War. He entered local administration in 1371 and became keeper of Knaresborough Castle, serving as warden to Richard II of England, who knighted Buckton in 1383 for gallantry. Buckton became closely associated with Henry Bolingbroke helping to organise his crusades to the Grand Duchy of Lithuania and Jerusalem, becoming one of Henry's most senior knights.

=== Yorkshire offices and later life ===
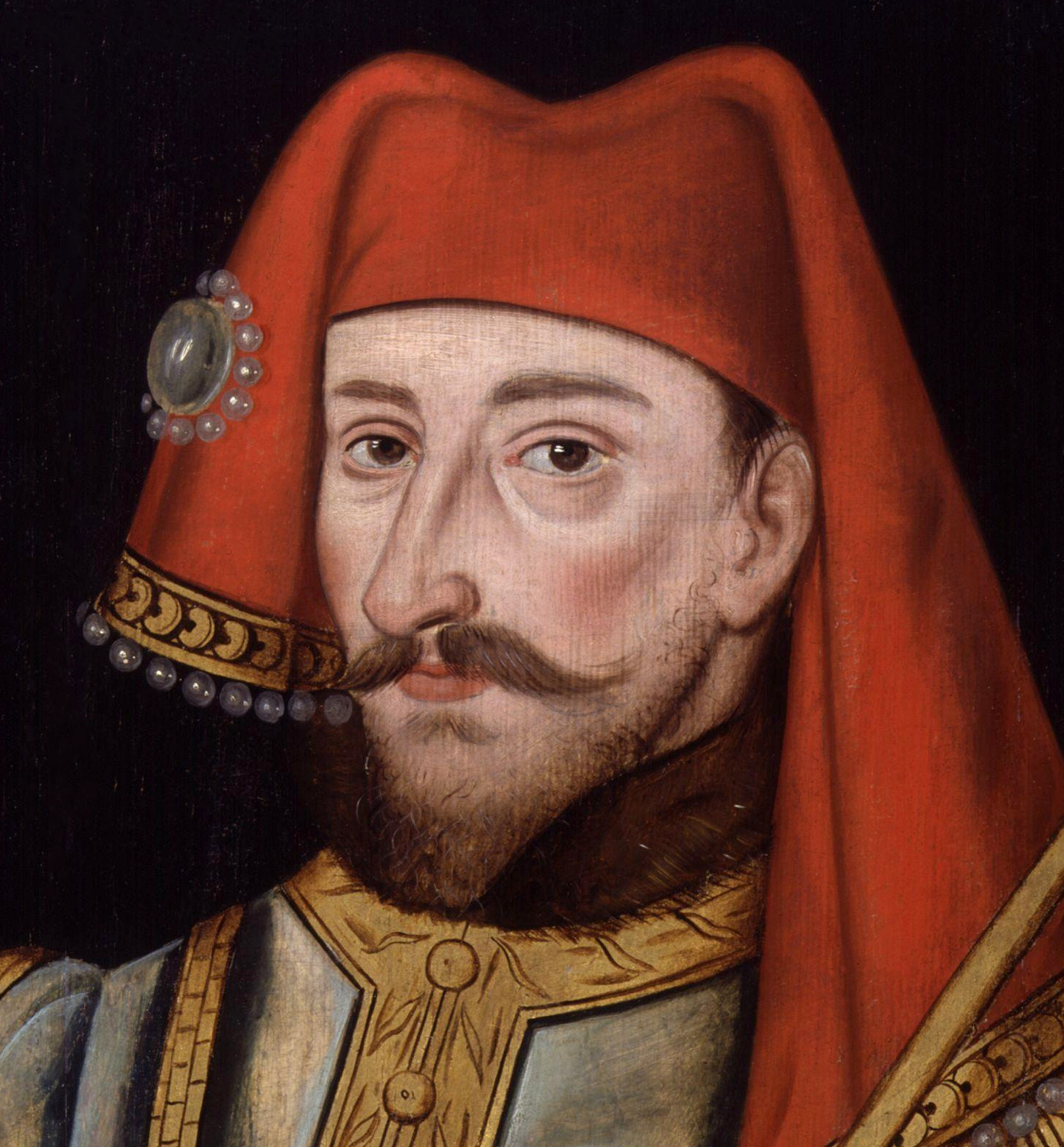
Henry IV of England

Buckton was elected knight of the shire (MP) for Yorkshire in 1395, 1397 and 1404.

A friend of Buckton was the author and poet Geoffrey Chaucer, who wrote The Canterbury Tales. Chaucer immortalised him in the short poem, Lenvoy de Chaucer a Bukton written before October 1396; in which Chaucer humorously warns Buckton against marriage. Buckton assisted Henry Bolingbroke's landing at Ravenspur in Yorkshire on 4 July 1399, after Henry had been exiled due to his cousin Richard II. When Bolingbroke became Henry IV of England, Buckton benefited significantly. He was made a life steward and steward of the king's son Thomas of Lancaster, 1st Duke of Clarence. He was also elevated to constable of Knaresborough Castle. Buckton rose prominently in other areas office also, as he was appointed Justice of the Peace for the East Riding of Yorkshire between 1399 and 1400, followed by High Sheriff of Yorkshire for 1404.

Buckton began to work for the monarchy in jobs outside England for a while. In 1411 he travelled to Castile and was the English Ambassador to John II of Castile. The following year, for 1412 until 1413, he was made Mayor of Bordeaux in the Duchy of Aquitaine, as the city of Bordeaux is the capital of Aquitaine this was a prominent position to hold. Buckton died in 1414, aged 64 and requested in his will to be buried at the Cistercian nunnery in Swine, East Riding of Yorkshire.

== Marriage and issue ==
Buckton married Cecilia, together they had three children.

- Peter Buckton
- Ralph Buckton
- William Buckton

Honorary titles
Preceded by Sir Richard Redman	High Sheriff of Yorkshire; 1404–1405	Succeeded by Sir William Dronsfield
