= 1807 United Kingdom general election in Yorkshire =

The county of Yorkshire was one of the constituencies that went to a poll during the general election of 1807. This was the first time Yorkshire had seen a contested election since 1741.

The election is one of the most famous from the pre-reform era. It is most well known because of the amount of money spent, nearly £250,000 between the three candidates. This makes it the most costly election of any before 1832.

The three contestants were: William Wilberforce, leader of the anti-slavery movement in Parliament and MP for Yorkshire since 1784; Henry Lascelles, son of Lord Harewood and representative of Yorkshire between 1796 and 1806; and Lord Milton, son of Earl Fitzwilliam. Counties each returned two MPs so two of these three would be successful.

Polling took place between 20 May and 5 June 1807. Wilberforce won with 11,808 votes whilst Milton gained the second seat with 11,177 votes. Lascelles came third with 10,990. This was only 187 fewer votes than Milton received.

== Result ==
Yorkshire election 1807
Party	Candidate	Votes	%	±%
Independent	William Wilberforce	11,808	34.75	N/A
Whig	Lord Milton	11,177	32.90	N/A
Tory	Henry Lascelles	10,990	32.35	N/A
Majority		187	0.55	N/A
Turnout		33,975		N/A
