= Charles Wentworth-FitzWilliam =

Charles Wentworth-FitzWilliam may refer to:

- Charles Wentworth-Fitzwilliam, 5th Earl Fitzwilliam (1786–1857)
- Charles Wentworth-FitzWilliam (MP) (1826–1894), MP, son of the above
- Sir Charles Wentworth-FitzWilliam (equerry) (1848–1925), grandson of fifth Earl, Crown Equerry to King George V

== See also ==
- Charles Fitzwilliam (disambiguation)
