= John Godard (died 1392) =

14th-century English politician

Sir John Godard (c. 1346 – 1392), of Bransholme, Yorkshire was a Member of Parliament for Yorkshire in 1386 and 1391.
