= John Etton =

English MP (d.1433) of Gilling, Yorks

Sir John Etton (died 1433), of Gilling, Yorkshire, was an English Member of Parliament (MP).

He was a Member of the Parliament of England for Yorkshire in 1411, November 1414, 1415 and December 1421. He was Sheriff of Yorkshire 22 November 1406 – 23 November 1407, 3 November 1412 – 6 November 1413.
