= Cholmley Turner =

British landowner and politician

- Born: 20 July 1685; Kirkleatham, Yorkshire, England
- Died: 9 May 1757 (aged 71); Kirkleatham, Yorkshire, England
- Education: New College, Oxford
- Occupations: Politician, landowner
- Known for: Member of Parliament for Northallerton and Yorkshire; founder of Kirkleatham Free School
- Spouse: Jane Marwood
- Children: Jane Turner (married Philip William Casimir Van Straubenzee)
- Parent(s): Charles Turner and Margaret Cholmley

Chomley Turner (1685–1757) of Kirkleatham, Yorkshire was a British landowner and politician who sat in the House of Commons between 1715 and 1747.

== Early life and family ==
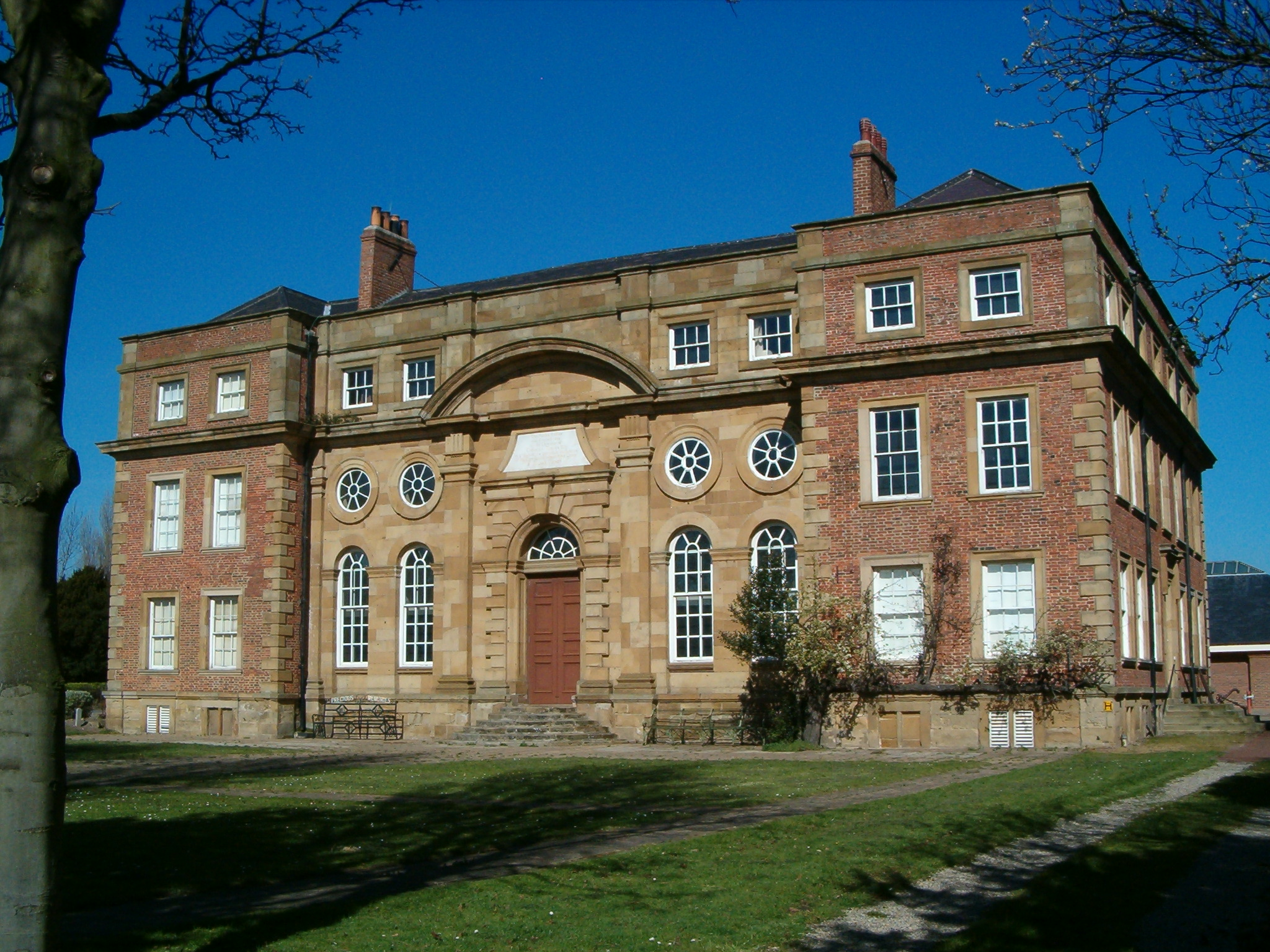
Kirkleatham Free School (now Kirkleatham Old Hall Museum)

Turner was baptized on 20 July 1685, the eldest son of Charles Turner of Kirkleatham and his wife Margaret Cholmley, daughter of Sir William Cholmley, 2nd Baronet, of Whitby, Yorkshire. He matriculated at New College, Oxford in 1701. He was a wealthy country gentleman, and owned properties in Northallerton and along Tees side. He also had lead mining interests in the North Riding of Yorkshire. His great uncle Sir William Turner died in 1693 and bequeathed him a substantial amount of money to establish a Free School, which was built in 1709.

He married Jane Marwood, daughter of George Marwood of Little Busby, Yorkshire in 1709. His daughter, Jane, married Philip William Casimir Van Straubenzee.

== Career ==
Turner was returned as a Whig Member of Parliament for Northallerton at the 1715 general election. He followed Robert Walpole into opposition in 1717, and voted against the Government in all recorded divisions. He did not stand at the 1722 general election. In 1725, he was High steward of York.

Turner was returned as MP for Yorkshire at a by-election on 1 February 1727 and followed it up being returned at the 1727 general election. In Parliament, he took a very independent line. He spoke on the opposition side in a debate on foreign affairs on 5 February 1729, and voted against the Government on the Hessians in 1730, the army in 1732, and the Excise Bill in 1733, but voted for the Government on the repeal of the Septennial Act in 1734. He said he would not stand at the next election, but changed his mind on receiving an invitation from the Whig county meeting at York. He was re-elected after a tough contest at the 1734 general election and voted with the Government on the navy estimates in February 1735, when he may have been influenced by the petition which was raised against his return. He also voted for the Spanish convention in 1739. He refused again to stand in 1741 but when a by-election was called he was adopted unanimously at another general Whig meeting and submitted to ‘the command of the gentlemen’. He was returned after a contest on 21 January 1742, and was elected to the secret committee of inquiry into Walpole's Administration, but never attended its meetings. His only vote in this Parliament was for the Hanoverians in 1744. In 1747 he finally retired.

== Later life ==
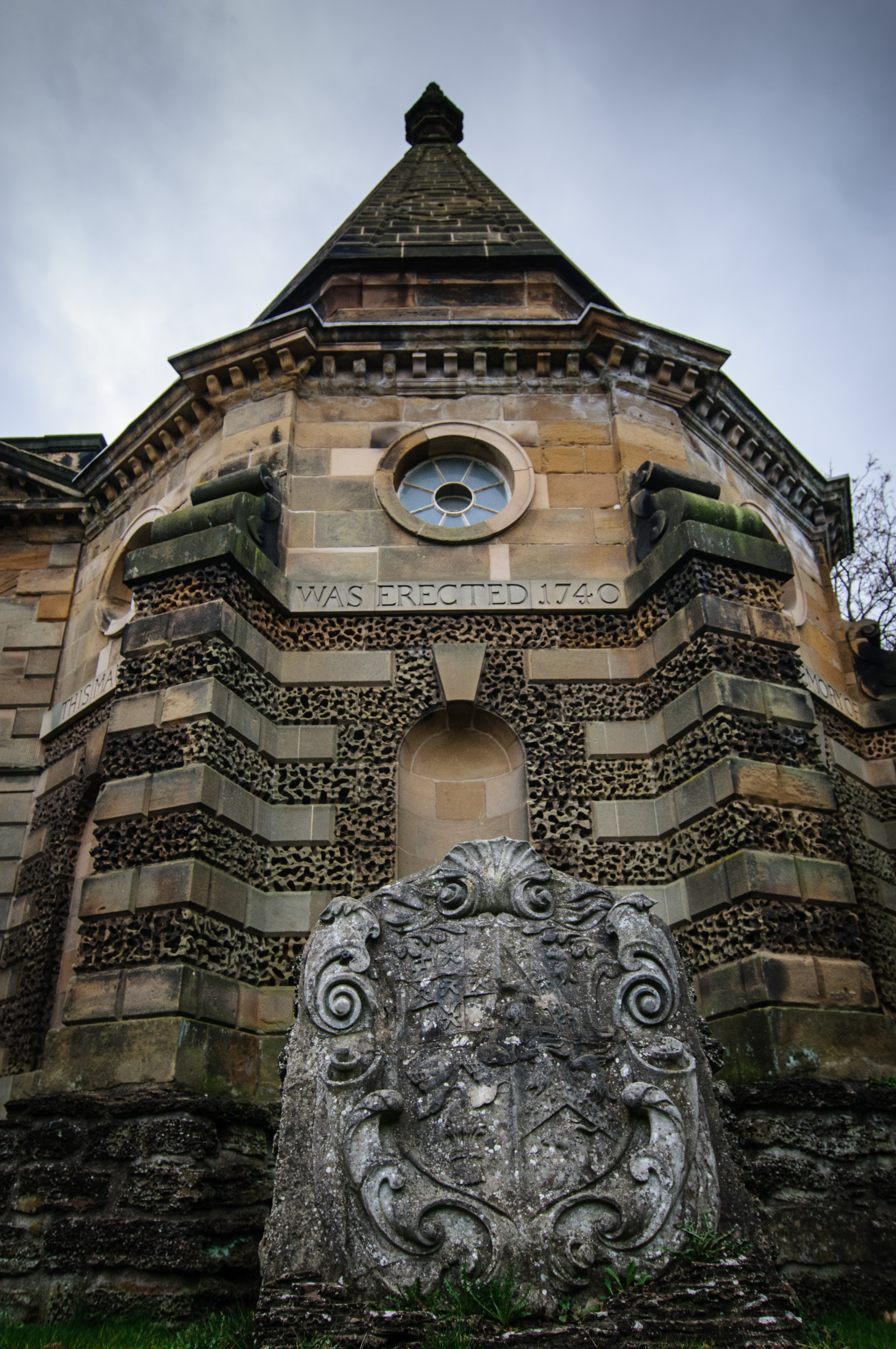
The Turner Mausoleum, 1740, by James Gibbs

Turner added other Grade I listed buildings to his estate, the most notable being the Turner Mausoleum, in memory of his son, and adjoining the Church of St Cuthbert. The mausoleum was built in 1739–40 by James Gibbs. It is of Baroque style and of an octagonal plan. It is a single storey with a basement burial chamber. The exterior is heavily rusticated, with an unusually large area vermiculated. It contains the inscription, "This mausoleum was erected 1740 to the memory of Marwood William Turner Esquire the best of sons." Cholmley Turner also retained the architect James Gibbs for building of the chapel at the almshouses. After his retirement Turner received a Secret Service pension of £500 a year from Pelham, but this was not renewed when Newcastle succeeded to the Treasury.

Turner died 9 May 1757, but his children pre-deceased him.

Parliament of Great Britain
Preceded by Leonard Smelt; Henry Peirse	Member of Parliament for Northallerton; 1715–1722; With: Leonard Smelt	Succeeded by Leonard Smelt; Henry Peirse
Preceded by Henry Dawnay; Sir Arthur Kaye, Bt	Member of Parliament for Yorkshire; 1727–1741; With: Henry Dawnay 1727; Sir Thomas Watson-Wentworth 1727-1728; Sir George Savile, Bt 1728-1734	Succeeded by Sir Miles Stapylton, Bt; Charles Howard
Preceded by Sir Miles Stapylton, Bt; Charles Howard	Member of Parliament for Yorkshire; 1742–1747; With: Sir Miles Stapylton, Bt	Succeeded by Sir Miles Stapylton, Bt; Sir Conyers Darcy
