= Walter Fawkes =

Yorkshire landowner and MP (1769–1825)

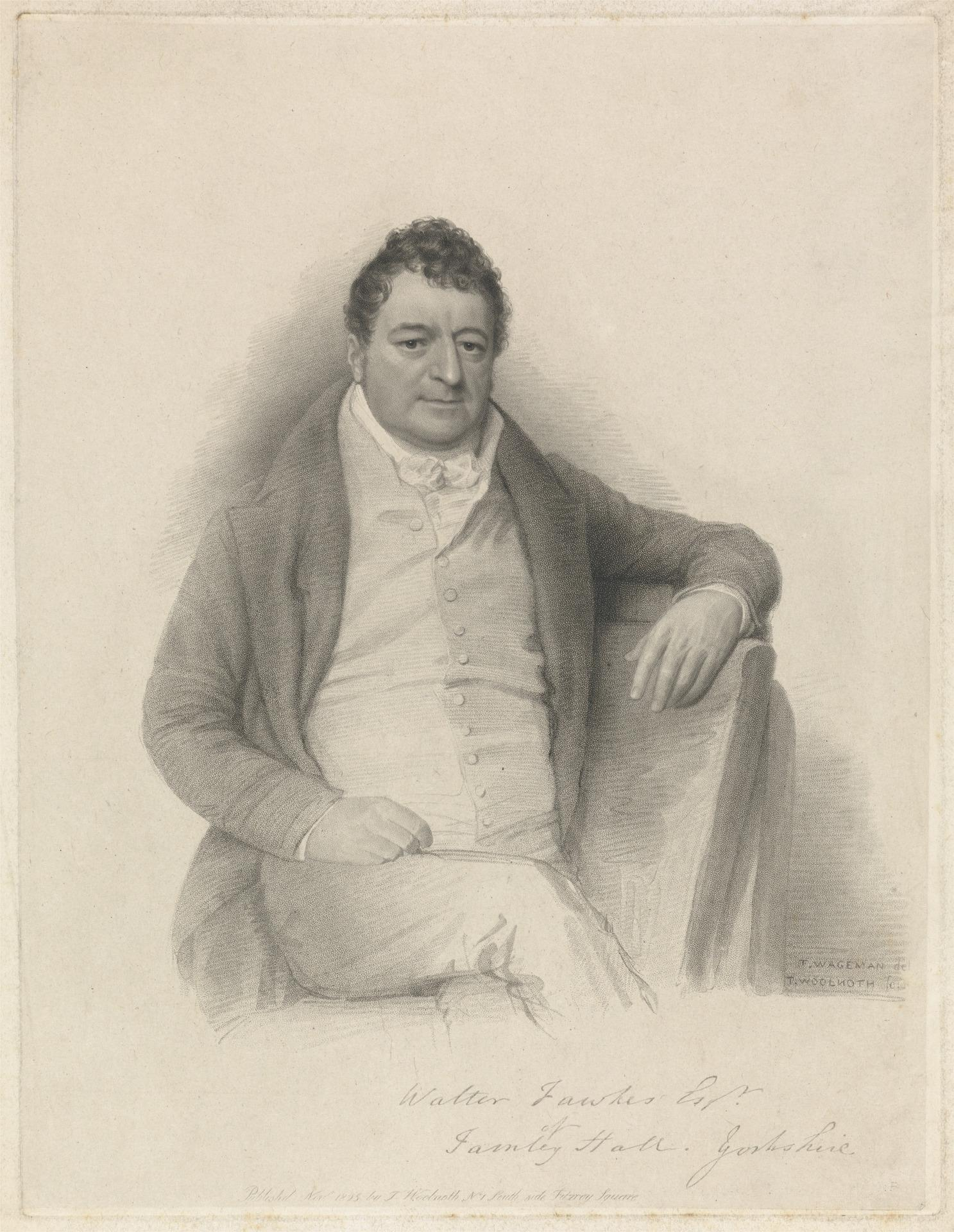
Walter Fawkes, Esq. by Thomas Woolnoth, 1825

J. M. W. Turner's 1816 painting Grouse Shooting on Beamsley Beacon – Fawkes is one of the subjects.

Walter Ramsden Hawkesworth Fawkes (2 March 1769 – 24 October 1825) was a Yorkshire landowner, writer and member of parliament (MP) for Yorkshire from 1806 to 1807.

== Biography ==
Walter Fawkes was born at Hawkesworth Hall, near Guiseley, into an old West Riding family, as Walter Ramsden Hawkesworth, the son of Walter Beaumont Fawkes. He inherited Farnley Hall in 1792, at which point he assumed the surname Fawkes.before him.

Early in life Fawkes became an active member of the advanced section of the whig party, being M.P. for the county of York from 1806 to 1807. He took a prominent part in the anti-slave trade movement, and spoke effectively in the debate which preceded the passing of Wilberforce's measure. In 1823 he filled the office of High Sheriff of Yorkshire.

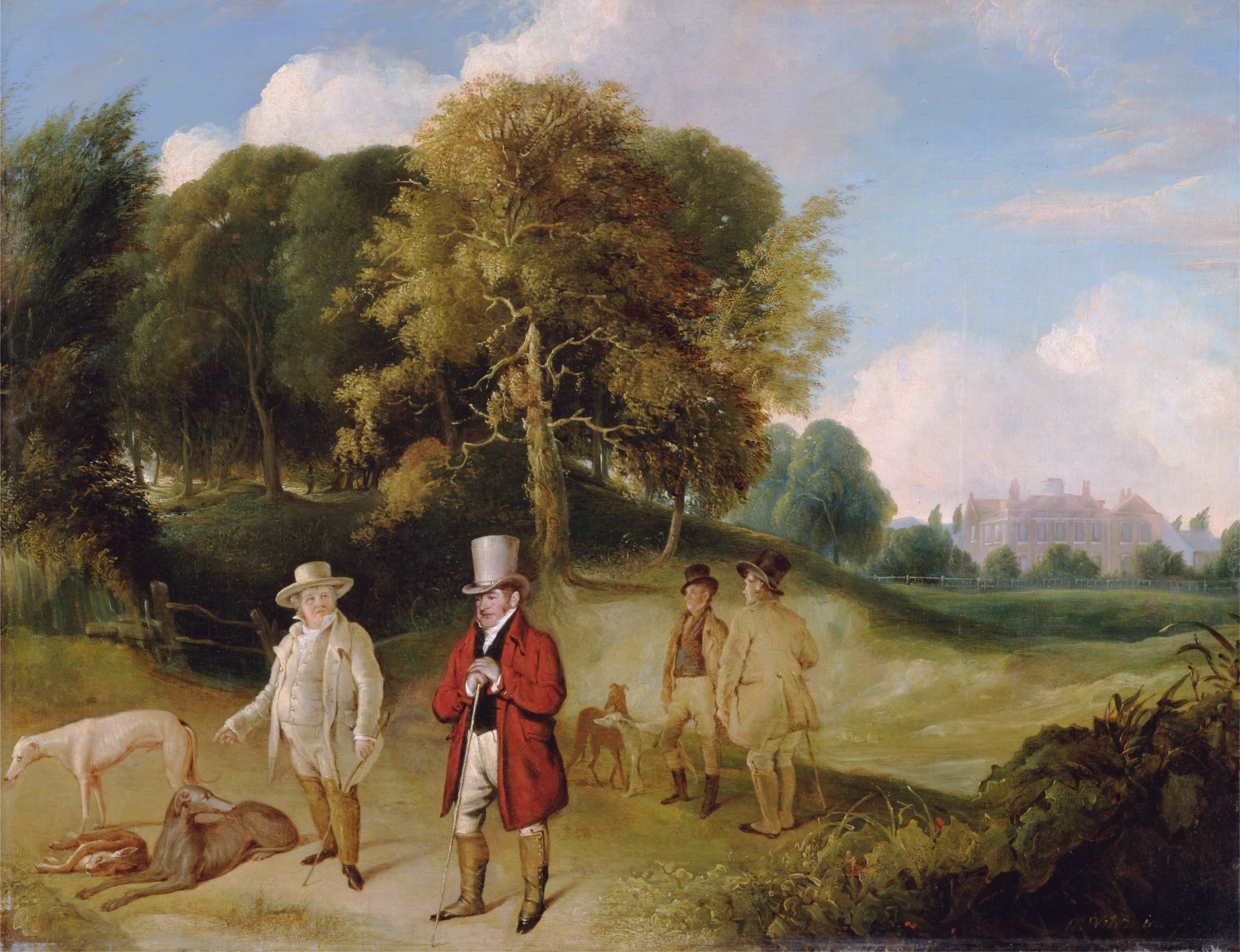
J.M.W. Turner and Walter Fawkes at Farnley Hall (John Richard Wildman, ca. 1820–1824)

Fawkes is best remembered, however, as the intimate friend and one of the earliest patrons of J. M. W. Turner, the artist

Turner had a welcome and a home at Farnley Hall, Fawkes's Wharfedale residence, whenever he chose to go, and used to spend months at a time there. John Ruskin has borne eloquent testimony to the influence of Fawkes, Farnley, and Wharfedale on the genius of Turner, and the Turner collection at Farnley Hall contained about 200 of the artist's works.

Fawkes was also a keen agriculturist. He did much towards the improvement of his estates, and was successful as a breeder of cattle, his shorthorns being well known. With Jonas Whitaker of Burley-in-Wharfedale and the Rev. J. A. Rhodes of Horsforth he founded the Otley Agricultural Society, one of the first of its kind in England. The park which he formed at Caley Hall was stocked with red and fallow deer, zebras, wild hogs, and a species of deer from India.

Fawkes enlarged the family mansion at Farnley, which he adorned with collections. He died in London on 24 October 1825, and was buried in the family vault at Otley.

== Works ==
Fawkes was a cultivated writer as well as a patron of the fine arts. In 1810 he published The Chronology of the History of Modern Europe, in 1812 a Speech on Parliamentary Reform, and in 1817 The Englishman's Manual; or, a Dialogue between a Tory and a Reformer. In all these he set out his political views. The Englishman's Manual brought a reply the same year from Michael Thomas Sadler.

== Family ==
Fawkes married, firstly, in 1794, Maria, daughter of Robert Grimston of Neswick, with whom he had four sons and seven daughters. She died in 1813. The children included:

- Maria, eldest daughter, married in 1823 Sir Edward Barnes. Their children included Richard Hawksworth Barnes.
- Anne, fourth daughter, married Godfrey Wentworth of Wooley Park (1797–1865, a first cousin).
- Amelia, married in 1828 Digby Cayley Wrangham.
- Lucy Susan, youngest daughter, married in 1836 Anthony Cleasby.
- Francis Hawkesworth, eldest son, married in 1825 Elizabeth Anne Butler, only daughter of Rev. the Hon. Pierce Butler and his stepmother Maria Sophia (see below). He left no children.
- Ayscough (died 1871), second son, rector of Leathley from 1837. He married in 1830 Ellen Story, daughter of John Bainbrigge Story of Lockington Hall. Their second son Frederick, vicar of Woolley, married in 1868 Ellen Mary Arkwright, and Frederick Hawksworth Fawkes was their son. Ayscough's daughter Ellen married Sir George John Armytage, 6th Baronet.
- Richard (1809–1896), youngest son, served in the 27th Foot.

Fawkes then married, in 1816, Maria Sophia, widow of Rev. the Hon. Pierce Butler, and daughter of John Vernon of Clontarf Castle. There were no children of the second marriage. Pierce Butler (1782–1808) was the third son of Henry Butler, 2nd Earl of Carrick.

== Notes ==
Parliament of the United Kingdom
Preceded by William Wilberforce; Henry Lascelles	Member of Parliament for Yorkshire; 1806–1807; With: William Wilberforce	Succeeded by William Wilberforce; Viscount Milton
