= Buckton, East Riding of Yorkshire =

Village in the East Riding of Yorkshire, England

Coordinates: 54.136°N 0.189°W

Buckton
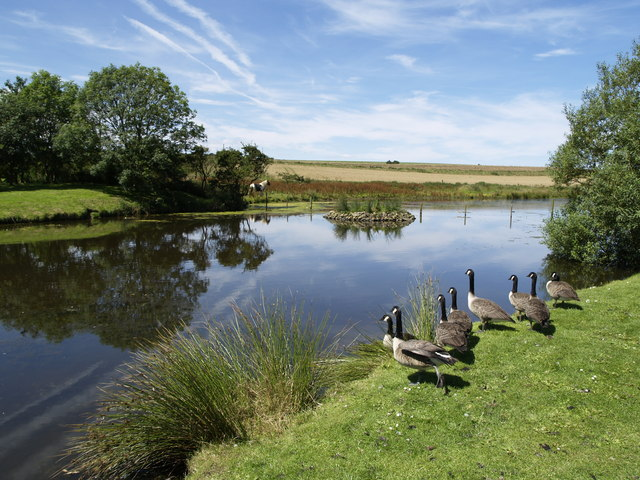
- Duck pond, Buckton

- Location within the East Riding of Yorkshire
- OS grid reference: TA183726
  - London: 180 mi (290 km) S
- Civil parish: Bempton
- Unitary authority: East Riding of Yorkshire
- Ceremonial county: East Riding of Yorkshire
- Region: Yorkshire and the Humber
- Country: England
- Sovereign state: United Kingdom
- Post town: BRIDLINGTON
- Postcode district: YO15
- Dialling code: 01262
- Police: Humberside
- Fire: Humberside
- Ambulance: Yorkshire
- UK Parliament: Bridlington and The Wolds

Buckton is a small village and former civil parish, now in the parish of Bempton, in the East Riding of Yorkshire, England. It is near the North Sea coast, and about 4 miles (6 km) north of Bridlington. It lies on the B1229 road.

The village is adjacent to Bempton, and shares the same local services. To the west of the village is Buckton Hall, a grade II* listed building with large cellars. The hall had a tunnel which connected with the bottom of the cliffs which allowed for smuggling activities and as late as 1931, a hoist for hauling contraband was still in the kitchen.

Buckton is a good place to find migrant birds, along Hoddy Cows Lane which runs from Buckton Cliffs to the north of the village. The cliffs at Buckton form part of the 5-mile (8 km) coastal region between Speeton and Bempton that is noted for its chalk face and its seabird habitats. This is administered by the RSPB as part of Bempton Cliffs. Up until 1954, tenant farmers from Buckton and Bempton used to climb down the cliffs and collect bird's eggs, a practice known locally as "Climming".

== History ==
The name Buckton derives from the Old English Buccatūn, with Bucca either being a personal name or referring to a male goat, and tūn meaning 'settlement'.

From the mediaeval era to the 19th century, Buckton was part of Dickering Wapentake. Buckton was formerly a township in the parish of Bridlington, from 1866 Buckton was a civil parish in its own right. In 1931 the parish had a population of 174. The parish was abolished on 1 April 1935 and merged with Bempton.

Between 1894 and 1974 Buckton was a part of the Bridlington Rural District, in the East Riding of Yorkshire. Between 1974 and 1996, it was part of the Borough of North Wolds (later Borough of East Yorkshire), Humberside.

== See also ==
- Listed buildings in Bempton
- HMS G3, wrecked at Buckton
- Sir Peter Buckton (1350 – 4 March 1414), politician, soldier and knight from Buckton
