= Buckton Hall =

Building in the East Riding of Yorkshire, England

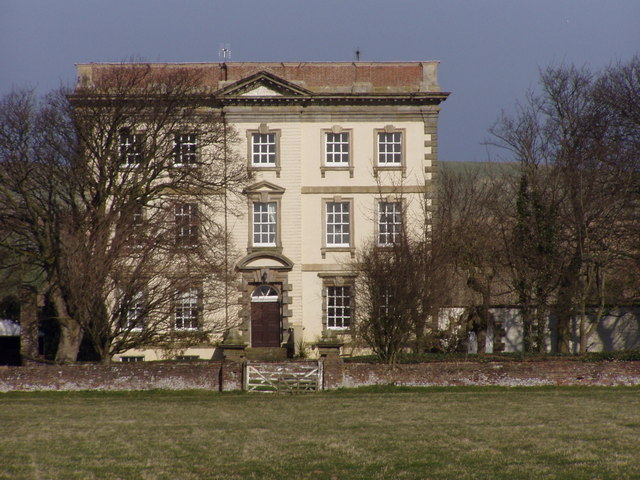
- The building in 2009

- Location within East Riding of Yorkshire

General information
- Type: Country house
- Location: Speeton Gate, Buckton, East Riding of Yorkshire, England
- Coordinates: 54°08′46″N 0°12′38″W
- Year built: 1744
- Renovated: c. 1920s (interior restored)
- Client: John Robinson

Listed Building – Grade II*
- Official name: Buckton Hall
- Designated: 11 January 1952
- Reference no.: 1083409

Buckton Hall is a historic building on Speeton Gate in Buckton, East Riding of Yorkshire, a village in England.

A manor house on the site was first recorded in the 13th century. The current house was built in 1744 for John Robinson, in the style of John Vanbrugh, possibly to a design by William Kent or the Earl of Burlington. It suffered a major fire in 1922, which destroyed the interior. (Note: The building's official listing records that the fire occurred in 1919.) It was soon restored, and was Grade II* listed in 1952. Local legend states that its cellars are connected to the nearby beach by tunnels, historically used by smugglers.

The country house is built of chalk, with stone dressings, on a moulded plinth, with rusticated quoins, floor bands, a moulded cornice with a pulvinated frieze, dentils, a brick parapet with moulded stone coping, and a flat concrete roof. It has three storeys and a basement, and five bays, the middle bay projecting slightly under a dentilled pediment. Steps with walls pilasters and abutments lead up to the central doorway that has a Gibbs surround, a fanned keystone, a pulvinated frieze, and a segmental pediment. The windows are sashes, those on the ground floor with Gibbs surrounds, pulvinated friezes, keystones and dentilled cornices. The central window on the middle floor has a pulvinated frieze and a dentilled pediment, the window above has a moulded and shouldered architrave, and the other windows have simpler architraves. Inside, there are two historic doorcases, and an overmantel dated 1892, both moved from elsewhere. The cellars have brick vaulting.

== See also ==
- Grade II* listed buildings in the East Riding of Yorkshire
- Listed buildings in Bempton
