= Charles Howard, Viscount Morpeth =

British member of parliament

Charles Howard, Viscount Morpeth (18 April 1719 – 9 August 1741) was a British member of parliament.

Howard was the eldest son of Henry Howard, 4th Earl of Carlisle, and his first wife, Lady Frances, daughter of Charles Spencer, 3rd Earl of Sunderland. He gained the courtesy title of Viscount Morpeth in 1738 when his father succeeded to the earldom. He went on a Grand Tour, and after his return, was elected to the House of Commons as one of the two representatives for Yorkshire in May 1741. Like his father, he was an opposition Whig.

By the time of his nomination, Morpeth was already suffering from symptoms of "consumption". His illness gave supporters of the Walpole Ministry and Opposition Whigs time to prepare for the by-election that would occur upon his death. He died at Castle Howard on 9 August. The "consumption" that caused his death appears to have been a "venereal distemper" which he contracted in Italy and which he concealed until it was untreatable.

In the subsequent by-election, the ministerial Whig candidate, Cholmley Turner, defeated George Fox, the Tory.

Parliament of Great Britain
Preceded by Cholmley Turner; Sir Miles Stapylton, Bt	Member of Parliament for Yorkshire; 1741; With: Sir Miles Stapylton, Bt	Succeeded by Sir Miles Stapylton, Bt; Cholmley Turner
