= Listed buildings in Bempton =

Bempton is a civil parish in the county of the East Riding of Yorkshire, England. It contains 19 listed buildings that are recorded in the National Heritage List for England. Of these, two are listed at Grade II*, the middle of the three grades, and the others are at Grade II, the lowest grade. The parish contains the villages of Bempton and Buckton, and the surrounding countryside. The listed buildings include houses, cottages and associated structures, a church and a gravestone in the churchyard, a windmill, a former vicarage, and a war memorial.

== Key ==
| Grade | Criteria |
|---|---|
| II* | Particularly important buildings of more than special interest |
| II | Buildings of national importance and special interest |

== Buildings ==
| Name and location | Photograph | Date | Notes | Grade |
|---|---|---|---|---|
| St Michael's Church; 54.13094°N 0.17861°W | | Early 13th century | The church has been altered and extended through the centuries. It is built mainly in stone, the chancel is in brick and partly pebbledashed, and the roofs are in slate. The church consists of a nave with a clerestory, north and south aisles, a south porch, a chancel and a west tower. The tower has two plain lower stages and an octagonal top stage, and between them are string courses. The west window has two trefoil-headed lights and a quatrefoil above, there are clock faces on the north and south fronts, the bell openings have two lights, and above is an embattled parapet. The clerestory windows are circular. | II* |
| Gravestone southwest of Manor Farmhouse; 54.12939°N 0.18205°W | — | 1721 | The gravestone is a recumbent stone slab about 1.5 metres (4 ft 11 in) by 0.5 metres (1 ft 8 in) in an isolated site. The inscription shows that it commemorates a person who committed suicide and was refused burial in consecrated ground. | II |
| Buckton Hall; 54.14616°N 0.21063°W | | 1744 | A country house in chalk, with stone dressings, on a moulded plinth, with rusticated quoins, floor bands, a moulded cornice with a pulvinated frieze, dentils, a brick parapet with moulded stone coping, and a flat concrete roof. There are three storeys and a basement, and five bays, the middle bay projecting slightly under a dentilled pediment. Steps with walls pilasters and abutments lead up to the central doorway that has a Gibbs surround, a fanned keystone, a pulvinated frieze, and a segmental pediment.The windows are sashes, those on the ground floor with Gibbs surrounds, pulvinated friezes, keystones and dentilled cornices. The central window on the middle floor has a pulvinated frieze and a dentilled pediment, the window above has a moulded and shouldered architrave, and the other windows have simpler architraves. | II* |
| Cowhouse, Buckton Hall; 54.14610°N 0.21106°W | — | 1744 | The pavilion to the southwest of the house, later used for other purposes, is in chalk on brick footings, with stone dressings, and a swept pantile roof with raised gables, stone coping and shaped kneelers. There is one storey, a rectangular plan, and three bays. The windows and the central doorway have alternating block jambs with flat heads and fanned keystones. On the right side is the stub of a quadrant wall. | II |
| Quadrant wall attached to northeast angle of Buckton Hall; 54.14623°N 0.21037°W | — | 1744 | The wall connects the house to a former pavilion. It is in red-brown brick with brick coping, and has a curved plan. The wall contains a segmental-arched doorway. | II |
| Quadrant wall attached to northwest angle of Buckton Hall; 54.14629°N 0.21087°W | — | 1744 | The wall connects the house to a former pavilion. It is in red-brown brick and has a curved plan, and contains two 20th-century openings. | II |
| Quadrant wall attached to southeast angle of Buckton Hall; 54.14606°N 0.21039°W | — | 1744 | The wall connects the house to a former pavilion. It is in chalk with moulded stone coping, and has a curved plan. The wall contains a doorway with a Gibbs surround, a flat head and a fanned keystone, and at the end is a rusticated pier from the former pavilion. | II |
| Storehouse northwest of Buckton Hall; 54.14629°N 0.21100°W | — | 1744 | The former pavilion is in red-brown brick, with a decorative string course, a dentilled eaves cornice, and a swept pantile roof with raised gables and kneelers. There is one storey and an attic, and a rectangular plan. None of the original openings have survived. | II |
| 54 High Street; 54.13158°N 0.18070°W | — | 18th century | The house, which was refronted in the 19th century, is in rendered chalk, with stone dressings, quoins, a stepped eaves cornice, and a pantile roof with raised gables and kneelers. There are two storeys, three bays, and a rear outshut. The doorway has pilasters with roundels and decorated capitals, a rectangular fanlight, and a moulded cornice on brackets. The windows are sashes under flat gauged brick arches. | II |
| 3 Pump Lane; 54.13541°N 0.18880°W | — | 18th century or earlier | The cottage is built in chalk on a cobble stone foundation, largely rendered, with a pantile roof. There is a single storey with attics, two bays, and a small barn on the left. On the front of the house is a doorway and two horizontally sliding sash windows, and the barn has a square window with a shutter. In the roof is a truss carrying cruck blades. | II |
| Bempton House; 54.13132°N 0.17756°W | | 18th century | The house, which was refronted in the 1840s, is rendered, on a moulded stone plinth, with stone dressings, rusticated quoins, a moulded sill band, a timber eaves cornice with paired brackets, and a hipped slate roof. There are two storeys, an L-shaped plan, and a front of three bays. The doorway has pilasters, a rectangular fanlight and a flat hood. The windows are sashes, those on the ground floor with moulded architraves, chambranles, moulded sills, and cornices on consoles, and the upper floor windows have eared architraves. | II |
| 12 Church Lane; 54.13091°N 0.17901°W | | Late 18th century | The house is in brick and cobbles, with a stepped eaves cornice, and a pantile roof with tumbled-in brick to the gables. There are two storeys and an attic, three bays, and a rear outshut. On the front is a 20th-century door, the left bay has a 20th-century window and a horizontally sliding sash window, above, and the other windows are four-pane sashes. | II |
| House to right of Mill Farmhouse; 54.12734°N 0.19602°W | — | Late 18th century | The house is in brick and chalk, and has a pantile roof with tumbled-in brickwork on the right gable, and plain close verges on the left gable. There is one storey and attics, three bays, and a rear outshut. The doorway has a flat brick arch with a keystone. On the ground floor of the left bay is a sash window under a segmental arch, and above is a horizontally sliding sash window. The other windows are tripartite with a central horizontally sliding sash, a flat brick arch and a keystone. | II |
| Bempton Mill; 54.12664°N 0.19599°W | | Early 19th century | A tower windmill in brick, with stone dressings and a stepped brick parapet. It consists of a conical tower of four storeys, and contains windows, some with segmental arches, and two doorways. | II |
| Bempton Mill Farmhouse; 54.12652°N 0.19563°W | — | Early 19th century | The farmhouse is in brick with a slate roof. There are two storeys, an L-shaped plan, a front of three bays, and an outshut on the left. Above the doorway is a small 20th-century window, and the other windows are sashes with wedge lintels. | II |
| Coverley House; 54.13161°N 0.18111°W | | Early 19th century | The house is rendered, on a plinth, and has stone dressings, and a pantile] roof with raised gables and kneelers. There are two storeys and attics, and two bays. The doorway on the right has an oblong fanlight, panelled reveals and soffits, and a doorcase with attached fluted columns and a projecting moulded head. The windows are sashes with wedge lintels. | II |
| Manor Farmhouse; 54.13010°N 0.17898°W | | Early 19th century | The house is in rendered chalk, and has a pantile roof and gables with plain close verges. There are two storeys and attics, and three bays. In the centre is a porch and a doorway in a wooden architrave, and the windows are sashes under wedge lintels. | II |
| The Rectory; 54.13032°N 0.17741°W | — | c. 1840 | The vicarage, later used for other purposes, is in pale brown and yellow brick, with a timber cornice, and a slate roof. There are two storeys and four bays. The doorway has a round gauged brick arch and a fanlight. To its right is a canted bay window, and the other windows are sashes. At the rear is a French window. | II |
| War memorial 54.13069°N 0.17897°W | | 1919 | The war memorial, in the churchyard of St Michael's Church, is in stone, and consists of a tall cross about 5 metres (16 ft) in height. On the cross head is a rose on the front and the rear, and on the arms are decorative motifs. Beneath is an octagonal shaft on a pedimented square plinth, on a square base. On the plinth are inscriptions and the names of those lost in the two World Wars and later conflicts. | II |
