= St Michael's Church, Bempton =

Church in the East Riding of Yorkshire, England

Coordinates: 54.1309°N 0.1787°W

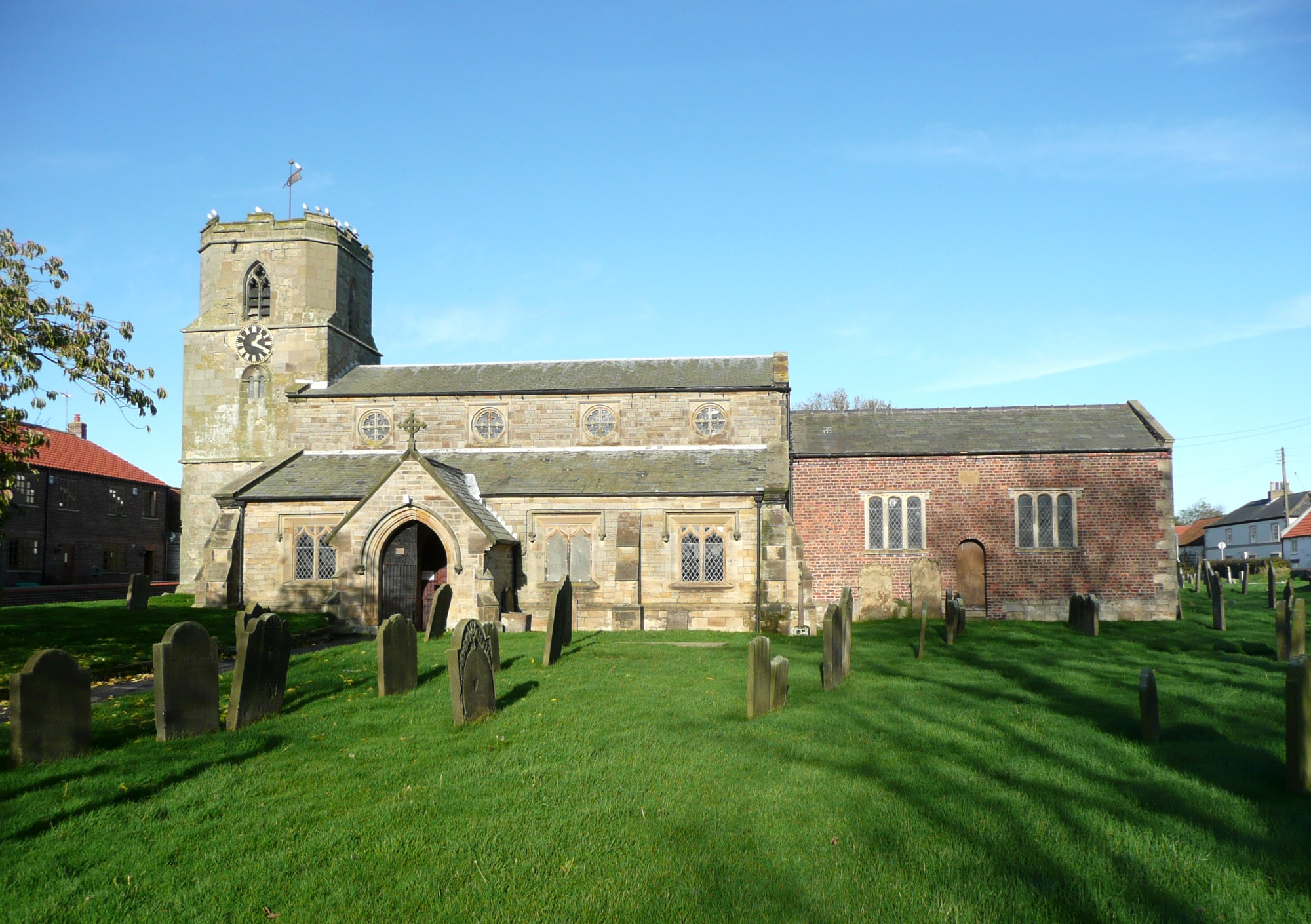
The church, in 2010

St Michael's Church is the parish church of Bempton, a village in the East Riding of Yorkshire, in England.

The oldest surviving parts of the church are the nave arcades, which were built around 1200. The west tower was built in the 14th century, while the chancel was rebuilt in 1829. The south porch was added later in the century, and the church underwent major restorations in 1870 and 1906. The building was grade II* listed in 1966.

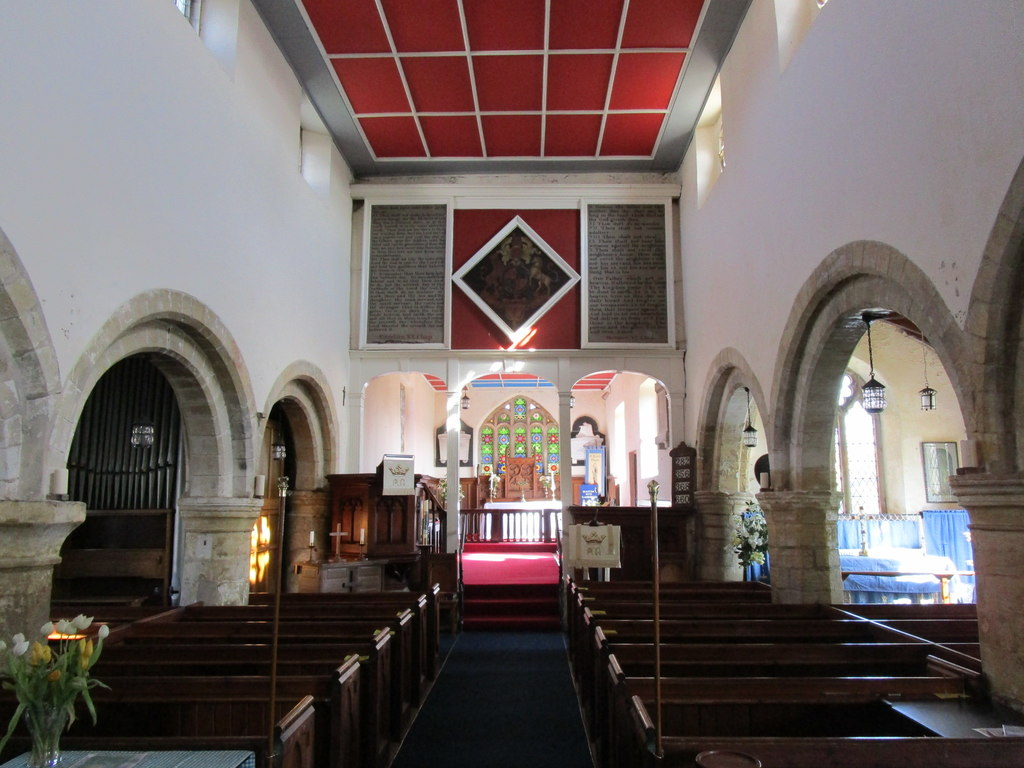
View from the nave into the chancel

The church is built mainly in stone, while the chancel is in brick and partly pebbledashed, and the roofs are in slate. The church consists of a nave with a clerestory, north and south aisles, a south porch, a chancel and a west tower. The tower has two plain lower stages and an octagonal top stage, and between them are string courses. The west window has two trefoil-headed lights and a quatrefoil above, there are clock faces on the north and south fronts, the bell openings have two lights, and above is an embattled parapet. The clerestory windows are circular. Inside, the timber chancel screen probably dates from 1829, and there is an early-13th century font. One of the two bells dates from around 1361.

== See also ==
- Grade II* listed buildings in the East Riding of Yorkshire
- Listed buildings in Bempton
