= Harriet Holroyd, Countess of Sheffield =

English courtier

The Right Honourable The Countess of Sheffield
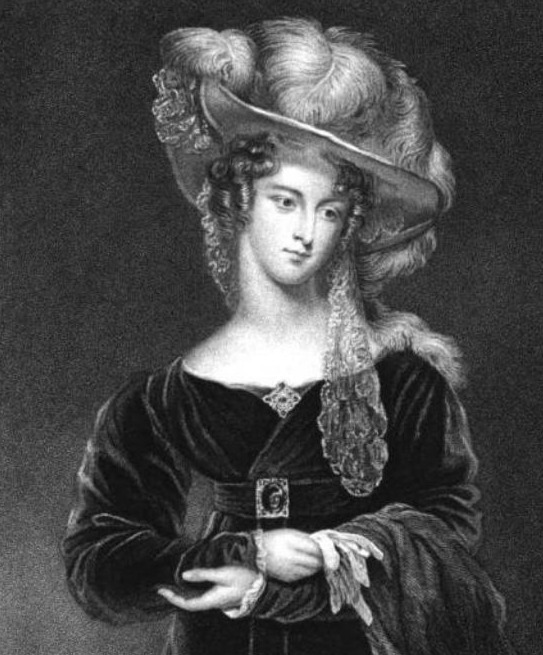
- Lady Sheffield, engraving after John Jackson, exhibited at the Royal Academy, 1828
- Born: Harriet Lascelles; 19 June 1802; Kensington, London
- Died: 1 January 1889 (aged 86); Brighton, England
- Spouse(s): George Holroyd, 2nd Earl of Sheffield (m. 1825; death 1876)
- Issue: Henry Holroyd, 3rd Earl of Sheffield
- Father: Henry Lascelles, 2nd Earl of Harewood
- Mother: Henrietta Sebright

Harriet Holroyd, Countess of Sheffield (née Lascelles; 19 June 1802 – 1 January 1889), styled as Lady Harriet Lascelles from 1820–5, was an English courtier who was Lady of the Bedchamber to Queen Adelaide, the consort of King William IV of the United Kingdom.

She was the sixth child and eldest daughter of Hon. Henry Lascelles, the younger son of Edward Lascelles, 1st Earl of Harewood. In 1814, her father's elder brother, Viscount Lascelles, died unmarried. He succeeded to the earldom in 1820.

Lady Harriet married George Holroyd, 2nd Earl of Sheffield, on 6 June 1825. Her portrait soon appeared in La Belle Assemblée, the society magazine, which carried pictures of "the female nobility and ladies of distinction". It was based on an original painting by the portraitist John Jackson, which was hung at the Royal Academy.

Their children were:

- Frederick Henry Stuart, Viscount Pevensey (1827–1829), died in childhood
- Lady Susan Harriet Holroyd (1829–1895) who married Edward Vernon Harcourt, MP, and had children
- Henry Holroyd, 3rd Earl of Sheffield (1832–1909)
- Douglas Edward Holroyd (1834–1882), a barrister who died unmarried

The earl died in April 1876, aged 74, and was succeeded by his eldest surviving son, Henry. The countess died on New Year's Day 1889 at 10 Royal Crescent, Brighton, aged 86. She is buried in the Sheffield family mausoleum at the Church of St. Andrew and St. Mary the Virgin, Fletching, East Sussex.
