= Yorkshire (constituency) =

Parliamentary constituency in the United Kingdom, 1801–1832

- Former county constituency for the House of Commons
- Extract from 1831 result: the dark "quadruply" (very) orange area for this election; inside: 14 small areas, 'parliamentary boroughs'.
- County: Yorkshire

1290–1832
- Seats: Two until 1826, then Four
- Replaced by: Yorkshire East Riding, Yorkshire North Riding and Yorkshire West Riding

Yorkshire was a constituency of the House of Commons of the Parliament of England from 1290, then of the Parliament of Great Britain from 1707 to 1800 and of the Parliament of the United Kingdom from 1801 to 1832. It was represented by two Members of Parliament, traditionally known as Knights of the Shire, until 1826, when the county benefited from the disfranchisement of Grampound by taking an additional two members.

The constituency was split into its three historic ridings, for Parliamentary purposes, under the Reform Act 1832. Each riding returned two MPs. The county was then represented by the Yorkshire East Riding, Yorkshire North Riding and Yorkshire West Riding constituencies.

== Boundaries ==
Yorkshire is the largest of the historic counties of England. The constituency comprised the whole county. Yorkshire contained several boroughs which each independently returned two members to Parliament. These were Aldborough, Beverley, Boroughbridge, Hedon, Kingston upon Hull, Knaresborough, Malton, Northallerton, Pontefract, Richmond, Ripon, Scarborough, Thirsk and York.

== Members of Parliament ==
=== MPs 1290–1640 ===
- Constituency created 1290

Parliament	First member	Second member
1309	Robert de Boynton	
1320	Sir Thomas Ughtred	
1324	Sir John Tempest of Bracewell	
1339	Sir Robert Hilton of Swine & Winestead	
1341	John de Siggeston	William Bruys
1364	Richard le Scrope, 1st Baron Scrope of Bolton	
1376	Sir John Savile of Shelley and Golcar	Sir Robert de Boynton
1377–1395	Henry FitzHugh	
1378	Sir John Hotham	
1380	Ralph Hastings of Kirby and Burton Hastings	
1382	John St Quentin of Harpham	
1382	Sir John Savile of Shelley and Golcar	
1383	Sir James Pickering	
1384	Sir John Savile of Shelley and Golcar	Sir James Pickering
1385	Sir William Melton of Aston and Kyllon	
1386	Sir John Godard	Sir John St Quentin of Harpham
1388 (Feb)	Sir William Melton of Aston and Kyllon	Sir Robert Constable
1388 (Sep)	Sir James Pickering	Sir Robert Neville of Hornby
1390 (Jan)	Sir John Savile of Shelley and Golcar	Sir Robert Neville of Hornby
1390 (Nov)	Sir William Ellis	Sir James Pickering
1391	Sir John Godard	Sir Robert Neville of Hornby
1393	Sir Ralph Euer	Sir Robert Neville of Hornby
1394	Sir John Routh of Routh	Sir Robert Neville of Hornby
1395	Sir Peter Buckton	Sir John St Quentin
1397 (Jan)	Sir Peter Buckton	Sir Ralph Euer
1397 (Sep)	Sir James Pickering	Sir David Roucliffe
1399	Sir Ralph Euer	Sir Robert Neville of Hornby
1401	Sir John Scrope of Hollinhall & Haldenby	Sir Gerard Usflete
1402	Thomas Colville	Sir Robert Rockley
1404 (Jan)	Sir John Routh of Routh	Sir Richard Tempest of Bracewell
1404 (Oct)	Sir Peter Buckton	Sir William Dronsfield
1406	Sir Richard Redman	Sir Thomas Rokeby
1407	Sir Edmund Hastings	Sir Alexander Lound
1410		
1411	Sir John Etton	Sir Robert Plumpton
1413 (Feb)		
1413 (May)	Sir Edmund Hastings	Sir Alexander Lound
1414 (Apr)	Sir Alexander Lound	
1414 (Nov)	Sir Richard Redman	Sir John Etton
1415	Sir Richard Redman	Sir John Etton
1416 (Mar)	Sir Brian Stapleton	Sir Robert Plumpton 1
1416 (Oct)		
1417		
1419	Sir Robert Hilton	Sir Halnath Mauleverer
1420	Sir Richard Redman	Sir John Langton
1421 (May)	Sir Edmund Hastings	Sir William Gascoigne
1421 (Dec)	Sir Richard Redman	Sir John Etton
1422 (Nov)	Sir William Euer	
1423	Sir Thomas Rokeby	
1425	Sir Robert Hilton	Sir William Ryther de Ryther
1426	Sir Robert Hilton	
1427	Sir Robert Hilton	
1431 (Jan)	Sir William Euer	
1439	Sir Thomas Savile	
1449	Sir James Strangways	William Eure
1450	Sir John Savile	
1461	Sir James Strangways	
1467	Sir John Savile	
1491	Thomas Scrope, 6th Baron Scrope of Masham	
1491	Sir Richard Tunstall	Sir Henry Wentworth
1510–1515	Not known	
1523	Sir William Bulmer	?
1529	Sir John Neville, ennobled and repl. Feb 1533 by Sir John Neville II	Sir Marmaduke Constable
1536		
1539	Sir Henry Savile	Robert Bowes
1542	Sir Ralph Ellerker	Sir Robert Bowes, disqualified and repl. Feb 1543 by Thomas Waterman
1545		
1547	Sir Nicholas Fairfax	Sir William Babthorpe
1553 (Mar)	Sir Thomas Gargrave	Sir Robert Constable
1553 (Oct)	Sir Robert Constable	Sir William Vavasour
1554 (Apr)	Sir William Babthorpe	Sir Christopher Danby
1554 (Nov)	Sir Thomas Wharton II	Sir Thomas Gargrave
1555	?Sir Robert Constable	Sir Thomas Gargrave
1558	?Thomas Wharton, 2nd Baron Wharton	Sir Richard Cholmley
1559	Sir Thomas Gargrave	Sir Henry Savile
1562	Sir Thomas Gargrave	Sir Nicholas Fairfax
1571	Sir Thomas Gargrave	Sir Henry Gates
1572	Sir Thomas Gargrave	Thomas Waterton died and repl. Jan 1576 by Sir Robert Stapleton
1584	Ralph Eure	Sir William Mallory
1586	Sir Henry Gates	Sir Thomas Fairfax of Denton
1588	Sir Henry Constable	Sir Ralph Bourchier
1593	Sir George Savile, Bt	John Aske
1597	Sir John Savile	Sir William Fairfax
1601	Thomas Fairfax	Sir Edward Stanhope
1604	Sir Francis Clifford	Sir John Savile
1606	Sir Richard Gargrave	Sir John Savile
1614	Sir John Savile	Sir Thomas Wentworth
1621	Sir Thomas Wentworth	Lord George Calvert
1624	Sir Thomas Savile	Sir John Savile
1625	Sir Thomas Wentworth	Thomas Fairfax
1626	Sir John Savile	Sir William Constable, Bt
1628	Henry Belasyse	Sir Thomas Wentworth
1629	Henry Belasyse	Sir Henry Savile, Bt
1629–1640	No Parliaments summoned	

=== MPs 1640–1826 ===
Short Parliament

- 1640: Sir William Savile, Bt
- 1640: Henry Belasyse

Long Parliament

- 1640–1648: The Lord Fairfax of Cameron (Parliamentarian) – died March 1648
- 1640–1642: Henry Belasyse (Royalist) – disabled to sit, September 1642

(Although writs were issued to fill both these vacancies, no elections seem to have been held and the seats remained vacant to the end of the Parliament)

Barebones Parliament (Nominated members)

- 1653: Lord Eure, Walter Strickland, Francis Lascelles, John Anlaby, Thomas Dickenson, Thomas St. Nicholas, Roger Coats, Edward Gill

First Protectorate Parliament (Fourteen members elected for the three Ridings)

- 1654–1655: East Riding: Hugh Bethell, Richard Robinson, Walter Strickland, Sir William Strickland; North Riding: Lord Eure, Francis Lascelles, Thomas Harrison, George Smithson; West Riding: Lord Fairfax, John Lambert, Henry Tempest, John Bright, Edward Gill, Martin Lister

Second Protectorate Parliament (Fourteen members elected for the three Ridings)

- 1656–1658: East Riding: Hugh Bethell, Richard Darley, Henry Darley, Sir William Strickland; North Riding: Lord Eure, Francis Lascelles, Major General Robert Lilburne, Luke Robinson; West Riding: John Lambert, Colonel Henry Tempest, Edward Gill, Francis Thorpe, Henry Arthington, John Stanhope

Third Protectorate Parliament

- 1659: The Lord Fairfax of Cameron, Thomas Harrison

Long Parliament (restored) Both seats vacant

Year	First member	First party	Second member	Second party
1660	Thomas Fairfax		Sir John Dawnay	
1661	Conyers Darcy		Sir John Goodricke, Bt	
1670	Conyers Darcy		Sir Thomas Slingsby, Bt	
1679	Charles Boyle		Henry Fairfax	
1685	Charles Boyle		Sir John Kaye, Bt	
1689	Thomas Fairfax		Sir John Kaye, Bt	
1698	Thomas Fairfax		Henry Dawnay	
January 1701	Thomas Fairfax		Sir John Kaye, Bt	
December 1701	Thomas Fairfax		Arthur Ingram	
1702	Marquess of Hartington		Sir John Kaye, Bt	
January 1707	Marquess of Hartington		Thomas Fairfax	
December 1707	Henry Dawnay		Conyers Darcy	
1708	Henry Dawnay		Sir William Strickland, Bt	
1710	Henry Dawnay		Sir Arthur Kaye, Bt	
February 1727	Henry Dawnay		Cholmley Turner	
August 1727	Sir Thomas Watson-Wentworth		Cholmley Turner	
1728 by-election	Sir George Savile, Bt		Cholmley Turner	
1734	Sir Miles Stapylton, Bt		Cholmley Turner	
1741	Sir Miles Stapylton, Bt		Charles Howard	
1742 by-election	Sir Miles Stapylton, Bt		Cholmley Turner	
1747	Sir Miles Stapylton, Bt		Sir Conyers Darcy	
1750 by-election	Henry Dawnay		Sir Conyers Darcy	
1759 by-election	Henry Dawnay		Sir George Savile, Bt	Whig
1761	Edwin Lascelles	Tory	Sir George Savile, Bt	Whig
1780	Henry Duncombe	Tory	Sir George Savile, Bt	Whig
January 1784 by-election	Henry Duncombe	Tory	Francis Ferrand Foljambe	Whig
April 1784	Henry Duncombe	Tory	William Wilberforce	Independent
1796	Hon. Henry Lascelles	Tory	William Wilberforce	Independent
1806	Walter Fawkes	Whig	William Wilberforce	Independent
1807	Charles Wentworth-FitzWilliam	Whig	William Wilberforce	Independent
1812	Charles Wentworth-FitzWilliam	Whig	Hon. Henry Lascelles	Tory
1818	Charles Wentworth-FitzWilliam	Whig	James Stuart-Wortley	Tory
1826	representation increased to 4 members			

=== MPs 1826–1832 ===
Election	First member	Party	Second member	Party	Third member	Party	Fourth Member	Party
Representation increased to 4 members
1826	Charles Wentworth-FitzWilliam	Whig	William Duncombe	Tory	Richard Fountayne Wilson	Tory	John Marshall	Whig
1830	George Howard	Whig	William Duncombe	Ultra-Tory	Richard Bethell	Tory	Henry Brougham	Whig
Dec 1830 by-election	George Howard	Whig	William Duncombe	Ultra-Tory	Richard Bethell	Tory	Sir John Vanden-Bempde-Johnstone, Bt	Whig
1831	George Howard	Whig	George Strickland	Whig	John Charles Ramsden	Whig	Sir John Vanden-Bempde-Johnstone, Bt	Whig
1832	Constituency abolished: see North Yorkshire, East Yorkshire and West Yorkshire							

== Elections ==
The county franchise, from 1430, was held by the owners of freehold land valued at 40 shillings or more. Each voter had as many votes as there were seats to be filled. Votes had to be cast by a spoken declaration, in public, at the hustings, which took place in the county town of York. The expense and difficulty of voting at only one location in the (very large) county, together with the lack of a secret ballot contributed to the corruption and intimidation of voters, which was widespread in the unreformed British political system.

The expense, to candidates, of contested elections encouraged the leading families of the county to agree on the candidates to be returned unopposed whenever possible. Contested county elections were therefore unusual.

=== Elections in the eighteenth century ===
Only two elections in the 18th century were contested.

General election 1734: Yorkshire (2 seats)
Party	Candidate	Votes	%	±%
Tory	Miles Stapylton	7,896	34.3	N/A
Whig	Cholmley Turner	7,879	34.2	N/A
Whig	Rowland Winn	7,699	33.5	N/A
Whig	Edward Wortley Montagu	5,898	25.6	N/A
Majority		180	0.7	N/A
Turnout		23,007		N/A

1741 Yorkshire by-election (1 seat)
Party	Candidate	Votes	%	±%
Whig	Cholmley Turner	8,005	53.2	N/A
	George Fox	7,049	46.8	N/A
Majority		956	6.4	+5.7
Turnout		15,054		N/A

At the 1784 general election, the seat was initially contested, but the two Whig candidates Francis Ferrand Foljambe and William Weddell conceded without calling for a poll.

=== Elections in the 1800s ===
At the 1802 general election, William Wilberforce and Henry Lascelles were elected unopposed.

At the 1806 general election, William Wilberforce and Walter Ramsden Fawkes were elected unopposed.

Yorkshire election 1807
Party	Candidate	Votes	%	±%
Independent	William Wilberforce	11,808	34.75	N/A
Whig	Lord Milton	11,177	32.90	N/A
Tory	Henry Lascelles	10,990	32.35	N/A
Majority		187	0.55	N/A
Turnout		33,975		N/A
Independent hold		Swing		
Whig hold		Swing		

=== Elections in the 1810s and 1820s ===
At the 1812 general election, Viscount Milton and Henry Lascelles were elected unopposed.

At the 1818 and 1820 general elections, Viscount Milton and James Stuart Wortley were elected unopposed.

At the 1826 general election, Richard Fountayne Wilson, John Marshall, William Duncombe and Viscount Milton were elected unopposed.

=== Elections in the 1830s ===
General election 1830: Yorkshire (4 seats)
Party	Candidate	Votes	%	±%
Whig	George Howard	1,464	29.0	N/A
Whig	Henry Brougham	1,295	25.7	N/A
Ultra-Tory	William Duncombe	1,123	22.3	N/A
Tory	Richard Bethell	1,065	21.1	N/A
Whig	Martin Stapyllton	94	1.9	N/A
Majority		71	19.2	N/A
Turnout		5,041		N/A
Whig hold		Swing		
Whig hold		Swing		
Ultra-Tory hold		Swing		
Tory hold		Swing		

1830 Yorkshire by-election (1 seat)
Party	Candidate	Votes	%	±%
Whig	John Vanden-Bempde-Johnstone	361	77.6	N/A
Whig	George Strickland	104	22.4	N/A
Majority		257	55.2	+36.0
Turnout		465		N/A
Whig hold		Swing		

At the 1831 general election, George Strickland, John Charles Ramsden, John Vanden-Bempde-Johnstone and George Howard were elected unopposed.

== See also ==
- Yorkshire election 1807
- List of former United Kingdom Parliament constituencies
- Unreformed House of Commons
