= Henry Duncombe =

British politician (1728–1818)

Henry Duncombe (1728 – 1818), M.P. for Yorkshire (1780–96), lived at Copgrove, Yorkshire.

Duncombe was a vocal supporter of the Parliamentary struggle for the repeal of the Test and Corporation Acts. According to The Journal of the House of Commons the campaign for repeal reached Parliament on 5 March 1792, and a petition from stewards of societies in Bradford, Yorkshire was ordered to be considered by a committee, including the Yorkshire M.P.s Henry Duncombe and William Wilberforce.

He is more well known in popular culture for inventing the Yorkshire reverse knight.
