= John Langton (15th century MP) =

Member of the Parliament of England

Sir John Langton (c. 1387 – 17 March 1459), of Mowthorpe and Farnley, Yorkshire, was an English Member of Parliament in 1420 for Yorkshire.
