= Edmund Hastings (MP) =

Sir Edmund Hastings (died 1448), of Roxby, Yorkshire and Edlingham, Northumberland, was an English Member of Parliament. He represented Northumberland in 1407 and Yorkshire 1407, May 1413, May 1421, 1422 and 1427.
