= Robert Hilton (15th century MP) =

15th-century English politician

Sir Robert Hilton (died c. 1431), of Swine and Winestead in Holderness, Yorkshire, was an English Member of Parliament for Lincolnshire in March 1416 and for Yorkshire 1419, 1425, 1426 and 1427.
