= Bempton =

Village and civil parish in the East Riding of Yorkshire, England

Coordinates: 54°07′54″N 0°10′44″W

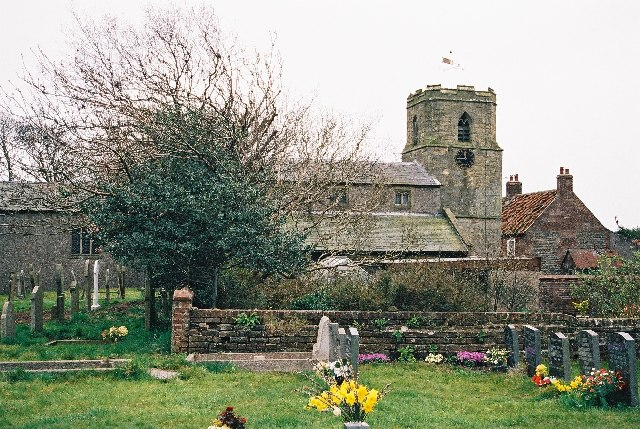
- St Michael's Church

- Location within the East Riding of Yorkshire
- Population: 1,040 (2011 census)
- OS grid reference: TA190722
  - London: 180 mi (290 km) S
- Civil parish: Bempton
- Unitary authority: East Riding of Yorkshire
- Ceremonial county: East Riding of Yorkshire
- Region: Yorkshire and the Humber
- Country: England
- Sovereign state: United Kingdom
- Post town: BRIDLINGTON
- Postcode district: YO15
- Dialling code: 01262
- Police: Humberside
- Fire: Humberside
- Ambulance: Yorkshire
- UK Parliament: Bridlington and The Wolds

Bempton is a village and civil parish in the East Riding of Yorkshire, England, near the border with North Yorkshire. It is near the North Sea coast and Flamborough Head, and is situated about 4 miles (6.4 km) north of Bridlington. It lies on the B1229 road between Speeton and Flamborough. It is served by Bempton railway station which is on the Yorkshire Coast Line that runs between Hull and Scarborough.

The parish of Bempton also contains Buckton village, which is situated directly to the west of Bempton. According to the 2011 UK census, Bempton parish had a population of 1,040, a slight decrease on the 2001 UK census figure of 1,050.

== History ==
Bronze Age pit dwellings have been discovered near Bempton.

The name Bempton derives from the Old English bēamtūn meaning 'settlement made of wooden beams' or 'settlement near a tree'.

Bempton used to be home to RAF Bempton, an early warning station. It was established in the Second World War as a radar station. It was finally closed in 1972. Some of the old buildings are still visible from the cliff top. The former RAF camp site is now a caravan park.

From the mediaeval era until the 19th century Bempton was part of Dickering Wapentake. Between 1894 and 1974 Bempton was a part of the Bridlington Rural District, in the East Riding of Yorkshire. Between 1974 and 1996 it was part of the Borough of North Wolds (later Borough of East Yorkshire), in the county of Humberside.

== Amenities ==
The village is well known for its cliffs which are located one mile from the centre of the village. Bempton Cliffs is an RSPB nature reserve, established in 1970. It is best known for its breeding seabirds, including northern gannet, Atlantic puffin, razorbill, common guillemot, black-legged kittiwake and fulmar. In places, the cliffs are 400 feet high, and it is the only mainland gannetry in the UK where these birds breed every year.

St Michael's Church, Bempton is a Grade II* listed building and dates back to the 13th century. It is part of the Headland Benefice. It was founded in 1120 on the site of an earlier church which had been constructed by a Saxon Lord of the manor. The Saxon church was destroyed on the orders of William the Conqueror in 1070.

Bempton has a post office and general store, a garage, a hairdresser, an antique shop, and a snooker club. It is home to Bempton Primary School, which was completely rebuilt in 2004 at a cost of over £1 million.

It also has a public house, The White Horse, which has a distinctive vivid blue Dutch tiled roof. It is local folklore that no other tiles were readily available at the time of construction, so the it was decided to use the blue tiles instead of waiting for delivery of standard tiles.

In 2014, after many years of fundraising and a lottery grant of £408,000, Bempton and Buckton Community Village Hall was opened on land between the two villages. There is also a children's playground close to the village hall.

Bempton, along with a number of other places in Yorkshire, was a filming location for the 2016 film Dad's Army, starring Catherine Zeta-Jones.

== Gallery ==
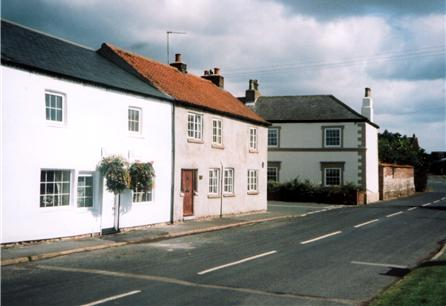
18th-century houses, High Street

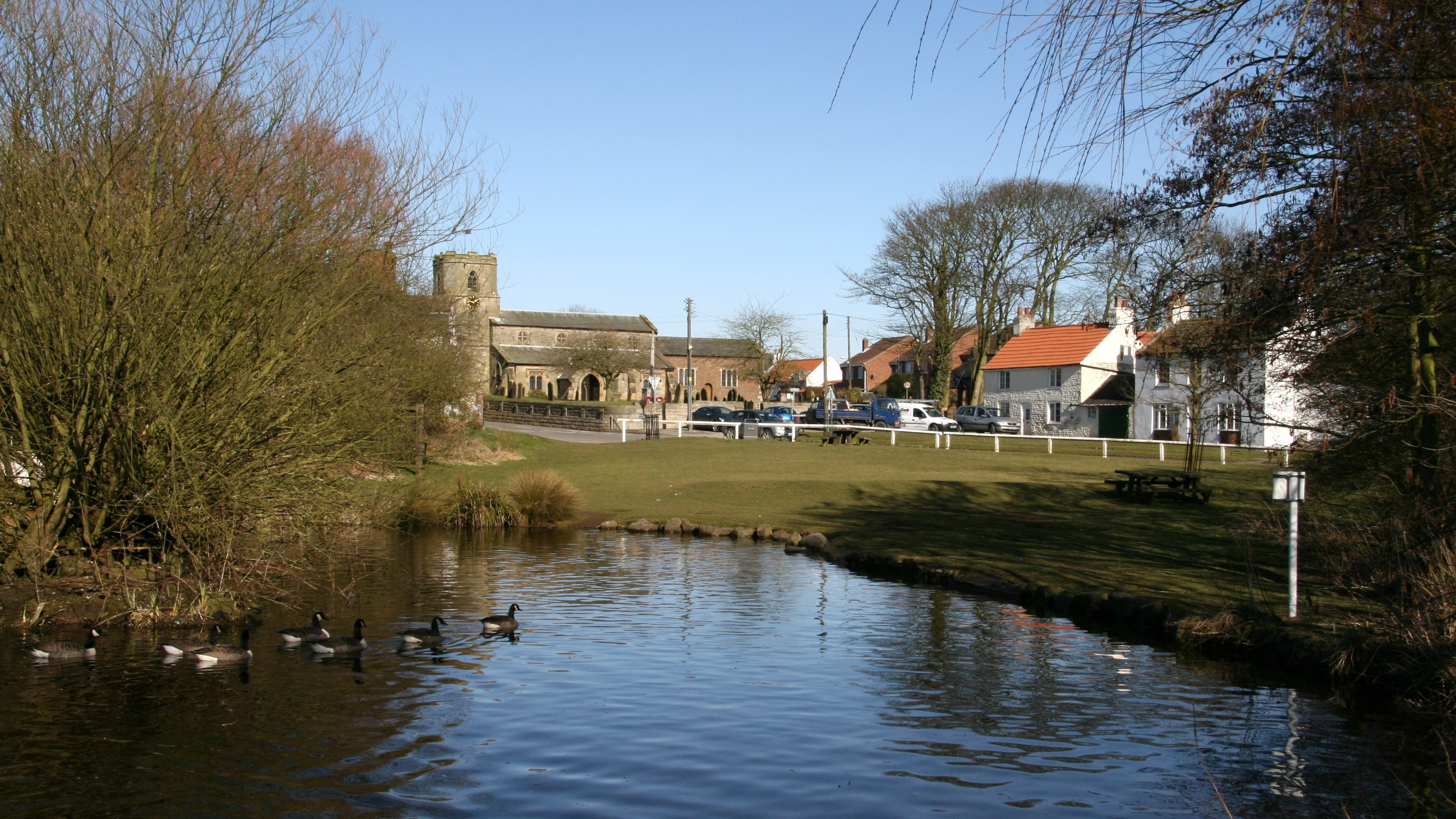
The mere

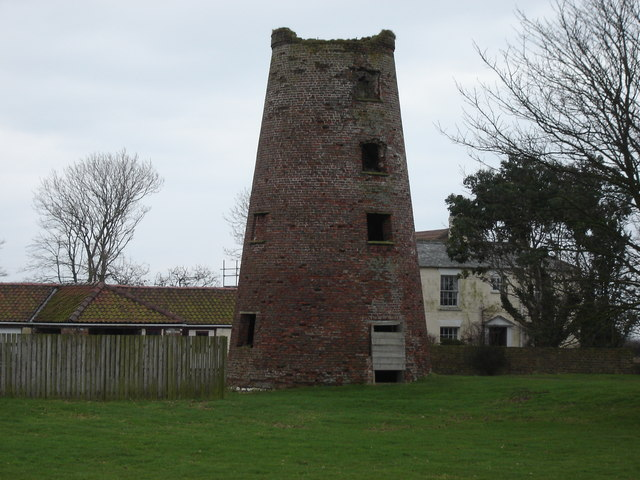
Old windmill at Mill Farm

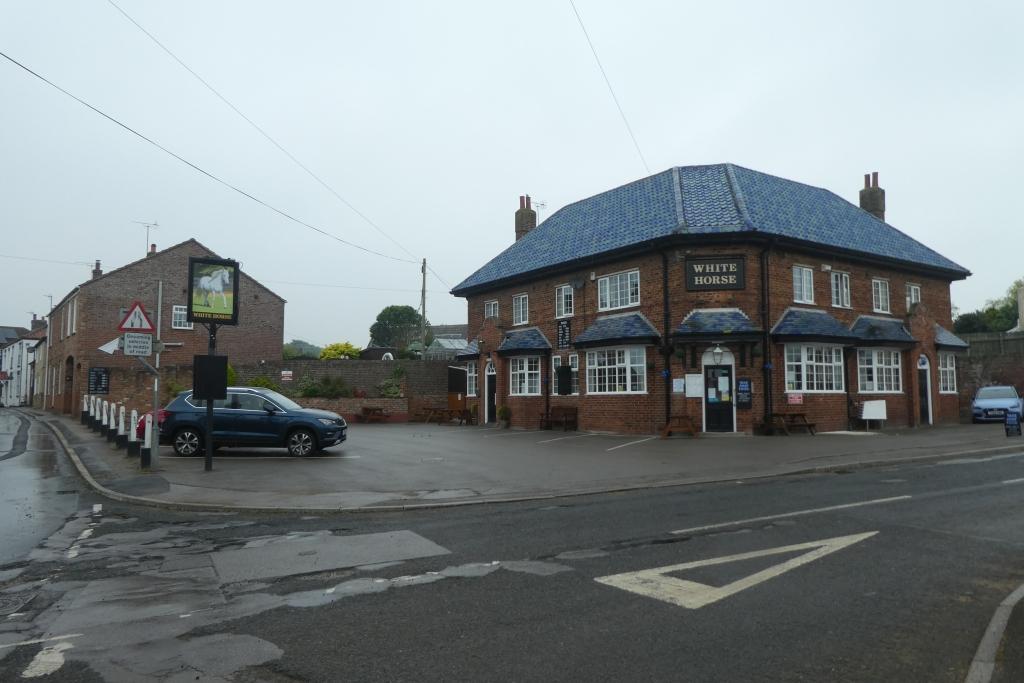
White Horse pub

== See also ==
- Bempton Cliffs
- RAF Bempton
- Listed buildings in Bempton
