= Sir George Savile, 7th Baronet =

English politician

Sir George Savile, 7th Baronet, FRS (10 February 1678 – 16 September 1743), of Thornhill, of Rufford Nottinghamshire, was an English politician who sat in the House of Commons from 1728 to 1734.

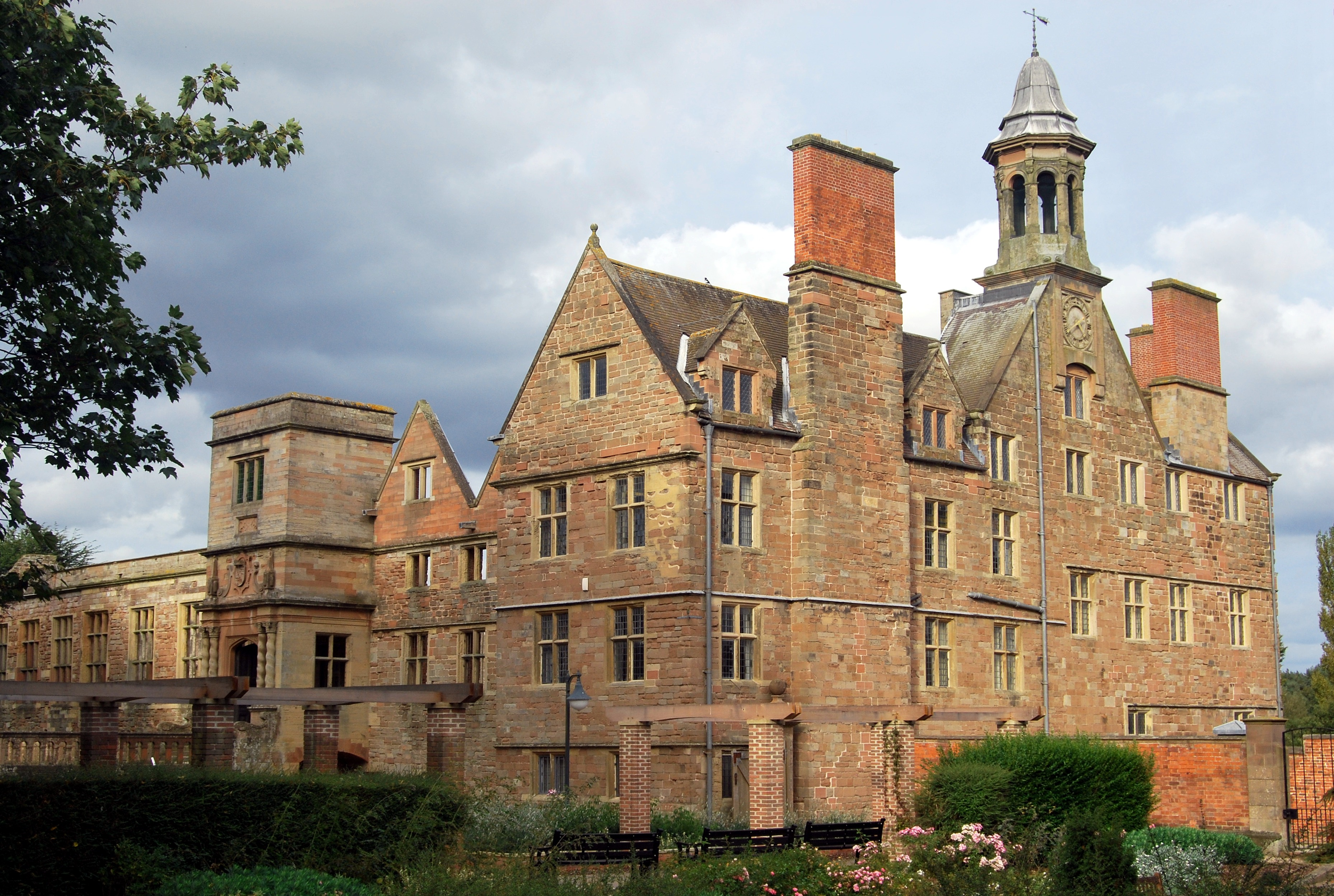
Rufford Abbey

Savile was the son of Rev. John Savile, rector of Thornhill, Yorkshire, and his second wife Barbara Jenison, daughter of Thomas Jenison of Newcastle. He was admitted at Middle Temple in 1691 and matriculated at Christ Church, Oxford, in 1696. He succeeded a first cousin of his father, Sir John Savile, 6th Baronet, in 1704, inheriting Rufford Abbey. He had two sisters: Ann and Gertrude.

Savile was appointed High Sheriff of Nottinghamshire for the year 1706 to 1707. He was returned as Member of Parliament (MP) for Yorkshire at a by-election in 1728 and sat until the 1734 general election.

Savile was elected a Fellow of the Royal Society in November 1721.

Savile married Mary Pratt, the daughter of John Pratt of Dublin (but reputedly the natural daughter of Henry Petty, 1st Earl of Shelburne), and had three children; Arabella, George (who became the 8th baronet), and Barbara, who married Richard Lumley-Saunderson, 4th Earl of Scarbrough.

Parliament of Great Britain
Preceded by Sir Thomas Watson-Wentworth; Cholmley Turner	Member of Parliament for Yorkshire; 1728–1734; With: Cholmley Turner	Succeeded by Cholmley Turner; Sir Miles Stapylton, Bt
Baronetage of England
Preceded by John Savile	Baronet (of Thornhill); 1701–1743	Succeeded by George Savile
