= Richard Fountayne Wilson =

British politician

Richard Fountayne Wilson (also given as Fountayne-Wilson; 9 June 1783 – 24 July 1847) was a British politician who served as a Member of Parliament for the Yorkshire constituency between 1826 and 1830.

The son of Richard Wilson and Elizabeth Fountayne, Fountayne Wilson's paternal grandfather was a bishop of Bristol and his maternal grandfather the dean of York. Both Fountayne Wilson's parents died separately in 1786 when he was three years old, leaving he and his brother as orphans; following his brother's death in 1801, Fountayne Wilson became the heir to his maternal grandfather's estate at High Melton Hall, near Doncaster, which he inherited the following year.

In February 1807 Fountayne Wilson was elected as High Sheriff of Yorkshire.

Fountayne Wilson was elected as one of four members for Yorkshire in the 1826 general election; he represented the Tory party. Fountayne Wilson retired from Parliament in 1830.

As an MP he was known as a "man of few words" in Parliament, but a prolific bringer of petitions.

He had at least seven children, and died in 1847 after suffering a series of illnesses.
