= Charles Wentworth-Fitzwilliam, 5th Earl Fitzwilliam =

British nobleman and politician

The Right Honourable The Earl Fitzwilliam KG
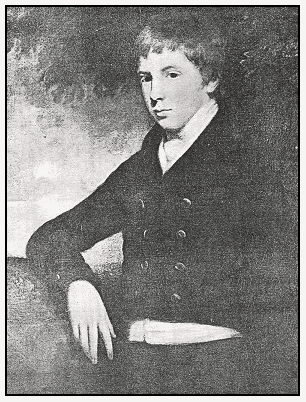
- copy of a portrait by John Hoppner
- Born: Charles William Wentworth-FitzWilliam; 4 May 1786
- Died: 4 October 1857 (aged 71)
- Education: Eton College
- Spouse: Hon. Mary Dundas (m. 1806; died 1830)
- Children: 13, including: William Wentworth-Fitzwilliam, 6th Earl Fitzwilliam; Hon. George Wentworth-Fitzwilliam; Hon. Charles Wentworth-Fitzwilliam
- Parents: William Fitzwilliam, 4th Earl Fitzwilliam; Lady Charlotte Ponsonby

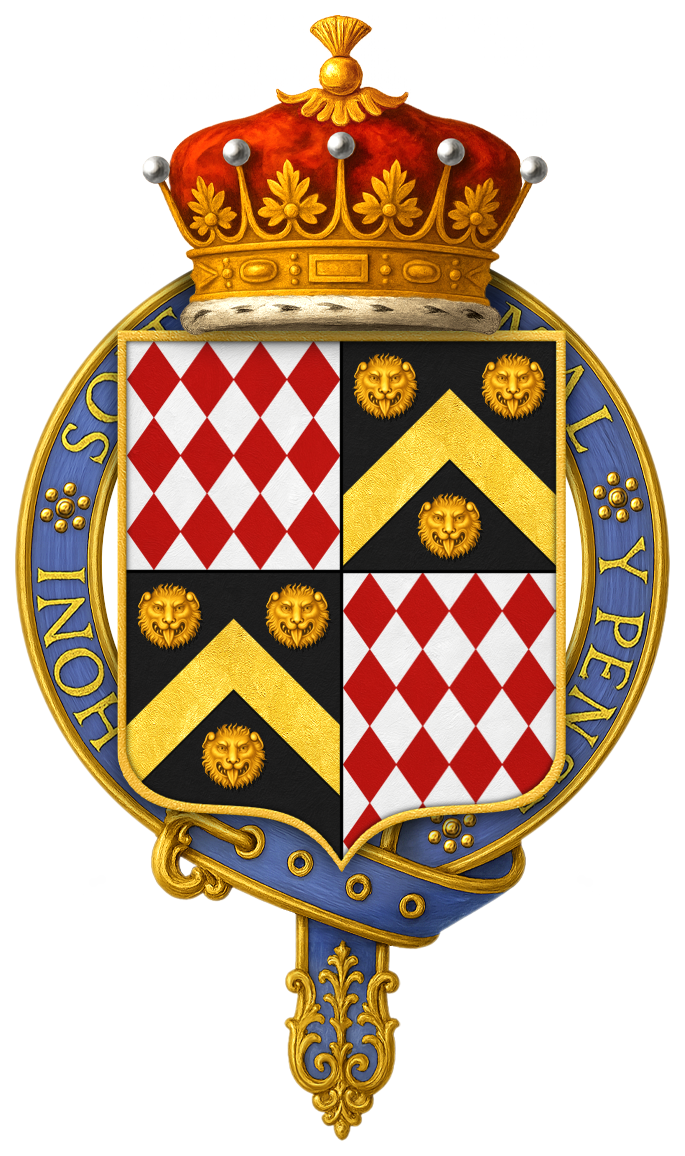
Quartered arms of Charles Wentworth-Fitzwilliam, 5th Earl Fitzwilliam, KG

Charles William Wentworth Fitzwilliam, 5th Earl Fitzwilliam in the peerage of Ireland and 3rd Earl Fitzwilliam in the peerage of Great Britain, (4 May 1786 – 4 October 1857) was a British nobleman and politician. He was president three times of the Royal Statistical Society in 1838–1840, 1847–1849, and 1853–1855; and president of the British Association for the Advancement of Science in its inaugural year (1831–2).

== Early life ==
He was born on 4 May 1786 as the only son of William Fitzwilliam, 4th Earl Fitzwilliam, who served as Lord President of the Council and Lord Lieutenant of Ireland, and his first wife, Lady Charlotte Ponsonby (daughter of William Ponsonby, 2nd Earl of Bessborough). After his mother's death in 1822, his father married the Hon. Louisa, Baroness Ponsonby (daughter of Richard Molesworth, 3rd Viscount Molesworth and widow of William Ponsonby, 1st Baron Ponsonby), in 1823, however, she died soon after in February 1824. (Note: From his father's second marriage, he had five step-siblings: John Ponsonby, 1st Viscount Ponsonby (a diplomat), Hon. Sir William Ponsonby (a Maj.-Gen. in the Army who was killed at the Battle of Waterloo), Richard Ponsonby (Bishop of Killaloe and Kilfenora, Derry, Derry and Raphoe), George Ponsonby (MP and Junior Lord of the Treasury), and Mary (wife of Prime Minister Charles Grey, 2nd Earl Grey).)

His paternal grandparents were William Fitzwilliam, 3rd Earl Fitzwilliam and Lady Anne Watson-Wentworth (daughter of Thomas Watson-Wentworth, 1st Marquess of Rockingham, and sister to Prime Minister Charles Watson-Wentworth, 2nd Marquess of Rockingham). His father inherited the 2nd Marquess of Rockingham's estates in 1782.

He was a pupil at Eton College from 1796 to 1802.

== Career ==
Before inheriting the Earldom on 8 February 1833 on the death of his father, he was known by the courtesy title of Viscount Milton. Under that name, he was the Whig Member of Parliament for Northamptonshire between 1831 and 1832. Fitzwilliam became a strong supporter of Parliamentary Reform and one of the principal advocates of repeal of the Corn Laws.

The family seat was Wentworth Woodhouse, reputedly the largest private house in England.

== Personal life ==
On 8 July 1806, Viscount Milton married his cousin, the Hon. Mary Dundas (1787–1830). Mary was the daughter of Thomas Dundas, 1st Baron Dundas and Lady Charlotte Fitzwilliam (the 4th Earl's sister). They had thirteen children:

- Lady Charlotte Wentworth-FitzWilliam (b. 1807)
- Hon. Margaret Bruce Wentworth-FitzWilliam (1809–1809)
- Lady Mary Wentworth-FitzWilliam (1810–1893), who married Leonard Thompson, Esq.
- William Charles Wentworth-FitzWilliam, Viscount Milton (1812–1835), who married Lady Selina Charlotte Jenkinson, daughter of Charles Jenkinson, 3rd Earl of Liverpool, in 1833. They had two children; the younger survived:
  - Stillborn son (14 November 1834)
  - Hon. Mary Selina Charlotte Fitzwilliam (1836–1899), who married Henry Portman, 2nd Viscount Portman.
- Lady Frances Laura Wentworth-FitzWilliam (1813–1887), who married Rev. William Bridgman-Simpson in 1837. They had five children:
  - Mary Bridgeman-Simpson (d. 1880)
  - Beatrice Dorothy Mary Bridgeman-Simpson (d. 1936)
  - Orlando John George Bridgeman-Simpson (1838–1907)
  - George Arthur Bridgeman-Simpson (1846–1913)
  - Admiral Sir Francis Charles Bridgeman-Simpson (1848–1929)
- William Thomas Spencer Wentworth-Fitzwilliam, 6th Earl Fitzwilliam (1815–1902)
- Hon. George Wentworth-Fitzwilliam (1817–1874), who married Alice Louisa Anson, daughter of daughter of Maj.-Gen. Hon. George Anson in 1865. They had three children:
  - George Charles Wentworth-Fitzwilliam (1866–1935), who married Daisy Evelyn Lyster, daughter of Charles Stephan Lyster, in 1888. They had two sons:
    - George James Charles Wentworth-FitzWilliam (1888–1955), who married Lorna Beryl Morgan in 1914. They had two children:
      - Richard John Godric Wentworth-Fitzwilliam (1916–1987)
      - Rosemary Ann Wentworth-FitzWilliam (1918–1997)
    - William Thomas George Wentworth-Fitzwilliam, 10th Earl Fitzwilliam (1904–1979)
  - Alice Mary Wentworth-Fitzwilliam (1869–1956)
  - Maud Wentworth-Fitzwilliam (1871–1949)
- Lady Anne Wentworth-Fitzwilliam (1819–1879), who married Sir James John Randoll Mackenzie of Scatwell, 6th Bt at the Chapel at Wentworth Woodhouse in 1838.
- Lady Dorothy Wentworth-FitzWilliam (b. 1822)
- Hon. John Wentworth-FitzWilliam (1823–1824)
- Hon. Charles William Wentworth-Fitzwilliam (1826–1894), who married Anne Dundas, daughter of Reverend Hon. Thomas Lawrence Dundas, in 1854. Died without issue.
- [a son] (b. and d. 18 Mar 1828)
- Lady Albreda Elizabeth Wentworth-Fitzwilliam (1829–1891), who married Fitzpatrick Henry Vernon, 2nd Baron Lyveden in 1853.

Lord Fitzwilliam died on 4 October 1857.

== Notes ==
Parliament of the United Kingdom
| Preceded by Bryan Cooke; Henry Grattan | Member of Parliament for Malton; 1806–1807; With: Bryan Cooke | Succeeded by The Lord Headley; Robert Lawrence Dundas |
| Preceded by William Wilberforce; Walter Ramsden Fawkes | Member of Parliament for Yorkshire; 1807–1830; With: William Wilberforce 1807–1812; Viscount Lascelles 1812–1818; James Stuart-Wortley 1818–1826; William Duncombe 1826–1830; Richard Fountayne Wilson 1826–1830; John Marshall 1826–1830 | Succeeded by William Duncombe; Viscount Morpeth; Richard Bethell; Henry Brougham |
| Preceded by Sir James Scarlett; Sir Robert Heron, Bt | Member of Parliament for Peterborough; 1830; With: Sir Robert Heron, Bt | Succeeded by Sir Robert Heron, Bt; John Nicholas Fazakerley |
| Preceded by Viscount Howick | Member of Parliament for Higham Ferrers; 1831 | Succeeded by Charles Pepys |
| Preceded by William Ralph Cartwright; Viscount Althorp | Member of Parliament for Northamptonshire; 1831–1832; With: Viscount Althorp | Constituency abolished |
| New constituency | Member of Parliament for North Northamptonshire; 1832–1833; With: Lord Brudenell | Succeeded by Lord Brudenell; Viscount Milton |
Peerage of Ireland
| Preceded by William Fitzwilliam | Earl Fitzwilliam; 1833–1857 | Succeeded by William Wentworth-Fitzwilliam |
Peerage of Great Britain
| Preceded by William Fitzwilliam | Earl Fitzwilliam; 1833–1857 | Succeeded by William Wentworth-Fitzwilliam |
Professional and academic associations
| Preceded by Richard Griffin, 3rd Baron Braybrooke | President of the Surtees Society; 1843–46 | Succeeded by Henry Vane, 2nd Duke of Cleveland |
