= Richard Redman (speaker) =

English politician (died 1426)

Sir Richard Redman (or Redmayne or Readman) (died 1426) was an English nobleman, knight, administrator and politician, being elected as a Member of Parliament representing Yorkshire and later acting as the Speaker of the House of Commons for the Parliament of 1415.

== Early life ==
Redman was the son of Sir Matthew Redman, who served in France and Spain under John of Gaunt, and grandson of another Sir Matthew Redman who was the Member of Parliament for Westmorland in 1357 and 1358.

== Career ==
Redman began his career as a soldier, campaigning on the continent, and was knighted by 1376. He was appointed High Sheriff of Cumberland for 1387, 1391, 1394, 1397, 1401 and 1410 and High Sheriff of Yorkshire for 1403 and 1415. In 1393 Richard was granted leave to hold a tournament in Carlisle. In 1397, after campaigning in Ireland with Richard II he was appointed Master of the Horse. Between 1399 and 1400 he travelled to Ireland with John de Cobham, 3rd Baron Cobham before returning to England in May to create a peace with Scotland. In 1405 he was commissioned to fine members of the gentry associated with the rebellion by Henry Percy, 1st Earl of Northumberland, and was the same year elected to represent Yorkshire as a knight of the shire (MP), a job he returned to for the Parliaments of 1414, 1415, 1420 and 1421. In 1408 he was commissioned again to fine gentry associated with the Percy Rebellion after their defeat at the Battle of Bramham Moor.

In 1409 and 1410 he attempted to gain peace with the Scots; after this failed he was tasked with raising forces against them. In 1415 along with John Strange he raised forces against the French before the Hundred Years' War (1415–1429) and was elected speaker of the 1415 parliament, which met on 4 November and lasted only eight days due to the loyalist feeling after the Battle of Agincourt before Parliament voted for supplies to maintain the war with France. In 1421 he was again commissioned to raise money for the war with France before his death in 1426.

== Later life ==
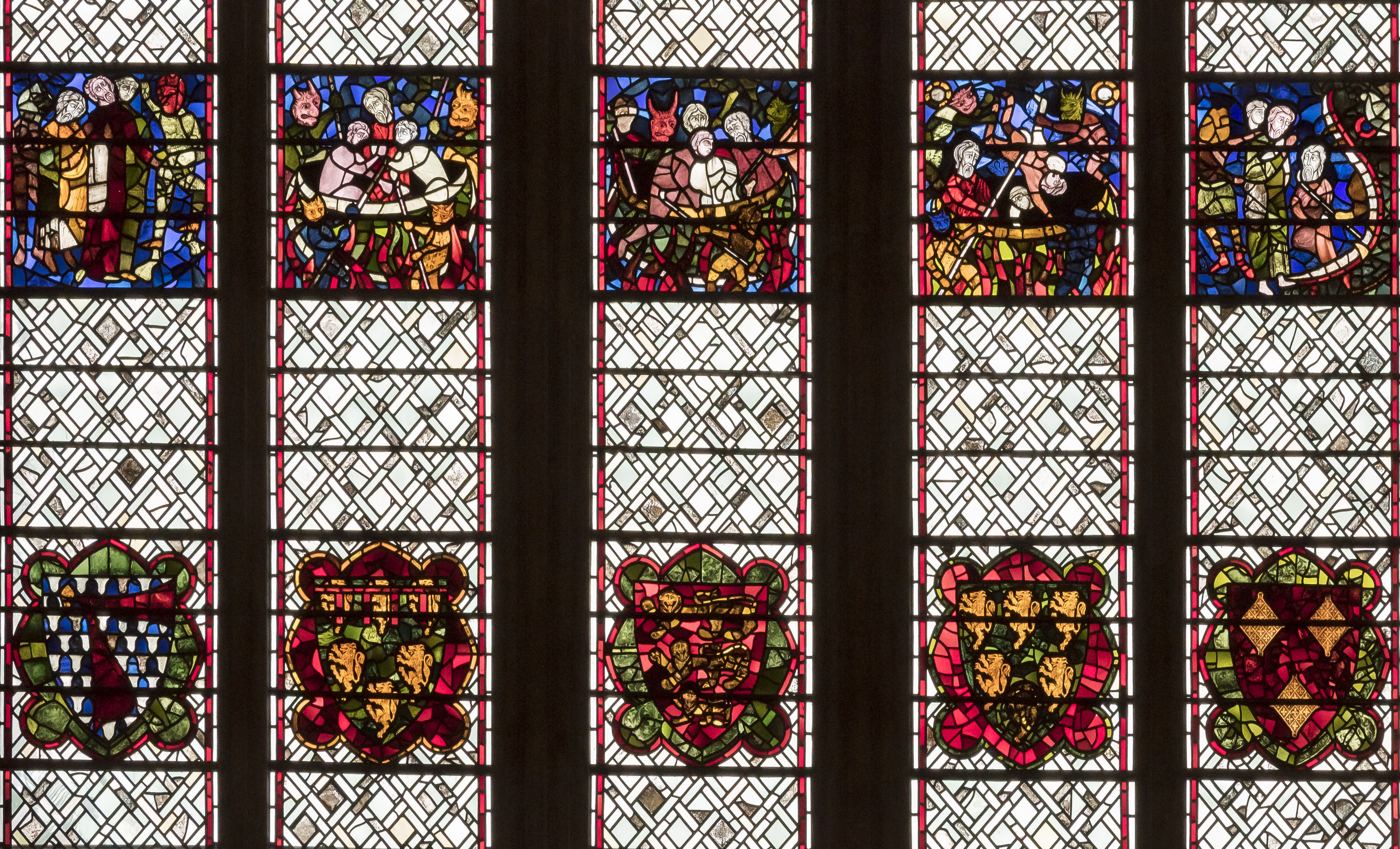
York Minster nave clerestory window S24 displaying Redman escutcheon in rightmost lancet frame

While he was a Knight of the Shire, the stained glass in the Nave Clerestory of York Minster was originally installed between 1404 and 1414, prior to the nave's completion in 1472. Funding the glazing of a single window was a favourite form in which to contribute to the carrying on of ecclesiastical work in the middle ages. It appears that Richard Redman was a benefactor of the cathedral because his escutcheon, Gules three cushions or, is displayed in the rightmost lancet frame in a gothic arch clerestory window.

Redman died in 1426 and was buried in the Church of the Black Friars, York. An elaborate memorial to him was installed in Harewood church, Yorkshire, where his estates lay. He had married twice, secondly to Elizabeth, the daughter of William, 1st Baron Aldeburgh of Aldeburgh and Harewood, and sister and co-heiress of William, 2nd Baron Aldeburgh and widow of Sir Brian Stapleton of Carlton, with whom he had at least two sons and two daughters. His surviving son, Matthew Redman, died before him in 1419 and he was succeeded by his grandson, Richard. Richard Redman, the Bishop of Exeter, was most likely his great-grandson.

Political offices
| Preceded by Thomas Chaucer | Speaker of the House of Commons; 1415 | Succeeded by Sir Walter Beauchamp |
