= Rabbit (disambiguation) =

A rabbit is a mammal.

Rabbit, The Rabbit or Rabbits may also refer to:

== Places ==
- Rabbit Mountain, a volcano in the Yukon, Canada
- Rabbit River (Michigan), United States
- Rabbit River (Bois de Sioux), Minnesota, United States
- Rabbit River (Mississippi River), Minnesota, United States
- Rabbit Island (disambiguation), in various countries

== Arts and entertainment ==
=== Film and stage ===
- Rabbit, working title of the 2012 film Chained
- Rabbit, a 2017 supernatural horror film starring Adelaide Clemens
- Rabbits, alternative title for the 1972 horror film Night of the Lepus
- Rabbits (film), a 2002 series of short films
- The Rabbits, a musical theater work

=== Music ===
- Rabbit (Australian band), a rock band from 1973 to 1977
- Rabbit (Japanese band), a Japanese band that formed in 2012
- Rabbit (album), by Collective Soul
- "Rabbit" (song), by Chas & Dave
- "Rabbit", a song by Tara VanFlower from My Little Fire-Filled Heart, 2005

=== Paintings ===
- The Rabbit (Manet 1866), a painting by Édouard Manet
- The Rabbit (Manet 1881), also by Manet

=== Fictional characters ===
- Rabbit (Winnie-the-Pooh)
- Rabbit Angstrom, protagonist of John Updike's Rabbit novel series
- Rabbit, a steam-powered clockwork robotic musician in the musical project Steam Powered Giraffe
- Rabbit, from the Australian TV series Round the Twist
- The title character of Reader Rabbit, a children’s educational game franchise established in 1983

=== Other arts and entertainment ===
- Rabbit (Koons), a sculpture by Jeff Koons
- Rabbits (podcast), a pseudo-documentary podcast
- "Rabbits" (The Flight Attendant), a 2020 television episode

== Technology ==
- Rabbit (nuclear engineering)
- Rabbit (telecommunications), a telephone service
- Rabbit, sequenced flashing lights in an approach lighting system for air traffic
- Rabbit Semiconductor, a micro-controller manufacturer
- Rabb.it, a video streaming service
- Rabbit r1, a personal assistant device

=== Computing ===
- Rabbit (cipher), a high-speed stream cipher
- Rabbit program, a type of malware
- RabbitMQ, an open source message broker, sometimes referred to as "Rabbit"
- Rabbits, large values around the beginning of the list in sorting; See Comb sort

== Sports ==
- Pacemaker (running) or rabbit, a type of race competitor
- Rabbit, a term in the game of cricket
- Svendborg Rabbits, a Danish basketball team

== Transportation ==
- Fuji Rabbit, a motor scooter
- Grey Rabbit, a defunct bus company in the United States
- Philippine Rabbit, a bus company
- Volkswagen Rabbit, a car

== Other uses ==
- Rabbit (nickname), a list of people
- Rabbit (zodiac), in the Chinese zodiac
- Rabbit vibrator, a type of sex toy
- Rabb.it, a now defunct video streaming website

== See also ==
- Br'er Rabbit, a fictional character as Uncle Remus tells stories of the Southern United States
- "Rabbit rabbit rabbit", a British superstitious phrase
- Bunny (disambiguation)
- Eddie Rabbitt (1941–1998), country singer
- Jimmy "B-Rabbit" Smith Jr., fictional character in 8 Mile
- Rabit (musician), an American producer of experimental electronic music
- Rabbet, a carpentry term
- Rabbitt (disambiguation)
- Rabbitte, a surname of Irish origin
