= William Tancred =

William Tancred may refer to:

- William Tancred (politician), English politician
- William Tancred (priest), Anglican priest in Australia
- Bill Tancred, sports administrator, academic and athlete
