= Bunny (disambiguation) =

Bunny is a colloquial term for a rabbit.

Bunny may also refer to:

== People ==
- Bunny (surname)
- Bunny (nickname)
- The Bunny, ring name of Canadian professional wrestler Laura Dennis
- Bunny, pseudonym of Carl E. Schultze (1866–1939), American newspaper cartoonist

== Characters ==
- Bunny (Harvey Comics), a Harvey Comics character
- Barnaby "Bunny" Brooks Jr., a character in the television show Tiger & Bunny
- Bunny (Lexx), a character on the television series Lexx
- Bunny (Powerpuff Girls), a one-time character on the TV series Powerpuff Girls
- Bunny (Sailor Moon) or Sailor Moon, the main character in Sailor Moon media
- Bunny Bravo, a character in the television series Johnny Bravo
- Bunny Manders, a character in the short stories about A. J. Raffles
- Howard "Bunny" Colvin, a character in the television show The Wire

== Entertainment ==
- Bunny (1998 film), an animated short
- Bunny (2005 film), a Telugu-language film
- Bunny (2025 film), an American film
- Bunny (play), a play by Norman Krasna
- Bunny (Beach Fossils album)
- Bunny (Halo Circus album)
- Bunny (YuiKaori album)
- Bunny (novel), a novel by Mona Awad

== Place names ==
- Bunny, Nottinghamshire, England, a village and civil parish
- Bunny Park, the local name for Brent Lodge Park and Animal Centre, in Hanwell, England
- Lough Bunny, a lake in the Burren in the west of Ireland

== Other uses ==
- Bunny, a term used in the sport of cricket, meaning an incompetent batsman
- Bunny, a local term for a chine or coastal valley in Hampshire, England
- Bunny, or Bunny chow, a fast food dish in South African cuisine
- Bunny, or Playboy Bunny, a waitress at a Playboy Club

== See also ==
- Bad Bunny (born 1994), Puerto Rican rapper and singer
- Lady Bunny (born 1962), American drag queen
- Goddess Bunny (1960–2021), American drag queen
- Easter Bunny, a mythological rabbit or hare bringing Easter eggs in Western culture
- Energizer Bunny, the marketing mascot of Energizer batteries in North America
- Bunnies!!!, a 2015 picture book
- Bunney, a surname
- Bunnie Holbert, Miss Arkansas 1977
- Bunnings
