= General Clinton (disambiguation) =

General Clinton may refer to:

- George Clinton (vice president) (1739–1812), Continental Army brigadier general
- Henry Clinton (British Army officer, born 1730) (1730–1795), British Army general
- Henry Clinton (British Army officer, born 1771) (1771–1829), British Army lieutenant general
- James Clinton (1736–1812), Continental Army brevet major general
- William Henry Clinton (1769–1846), British Army general
