= Bunny (surname) =

Bunny is a surname. Notable people with the surname include:

- Edmund Bunny (1540–1619), Calvinist theologian
- Edmund Bunny (1863/64-1941), New Zealand politician
- John Bunny (1862–1915), American silent film comedian
- Henry Bunny (1822–1891), New Zealand politician
- Richard Bunny (disambiguation)
- Rupert Bunny (1864–1947), Australian painter

== See also ==
- Bunney, another surname
