= Sir George Savile, 1st Baronet =

English baronet

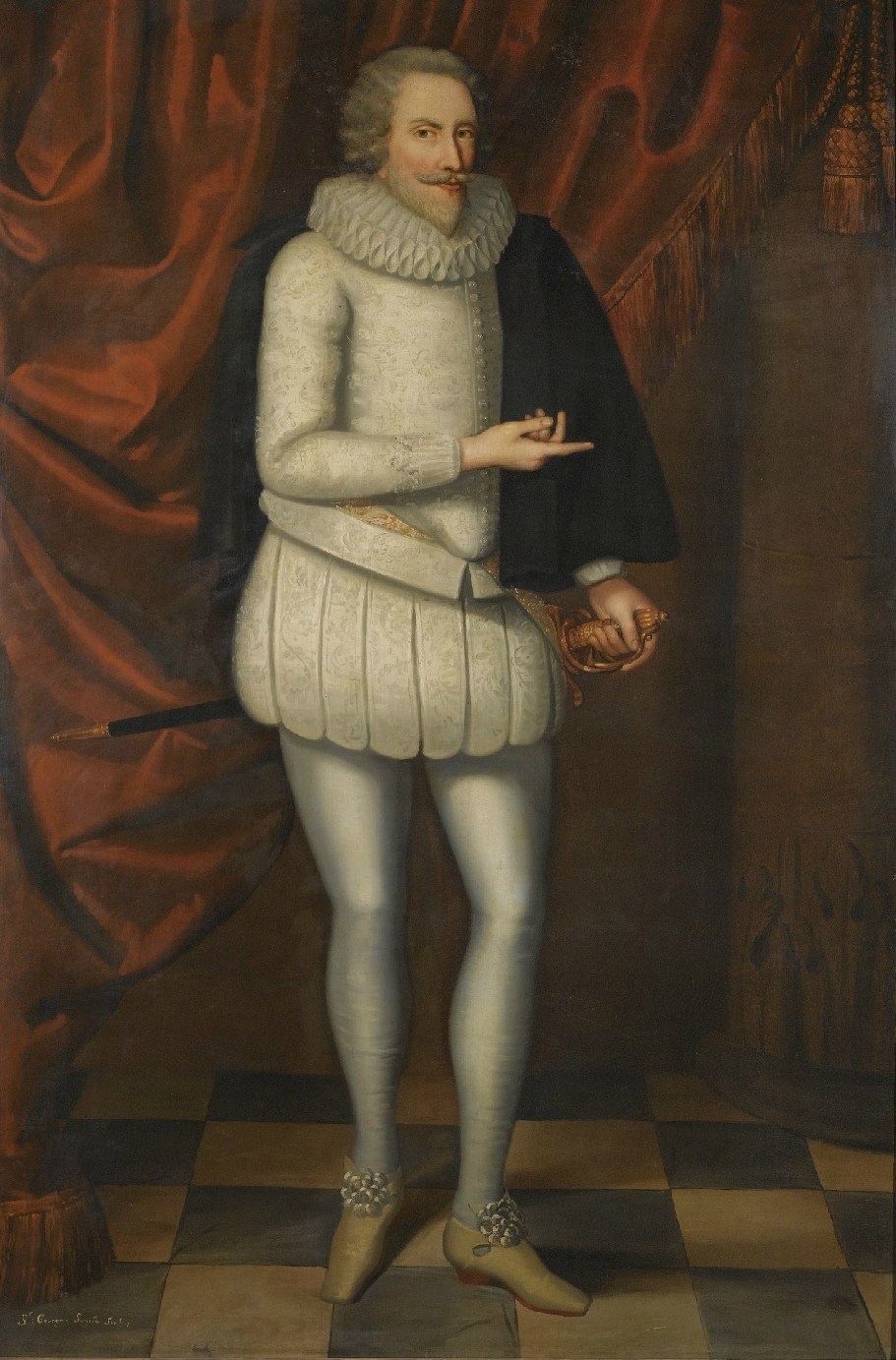
- Portrait of George Savile by Marcus Gheeraerts the Younger
- Born: 1551
- Died: 1622 (aged 70–71)
- Spouses: Mary Talbot; Elizabeth Ayscough
- Parents: Henry Savile (father); Joan Vernon (mother)

Sir George Savile, 1st Baronet of Thornhill (1551 – 12 November 1622), was an English politician and the lineal ancestor of the Marquesses of Halifax.

He was born in 1551, the eldest son of Henry Savile and Joan Vernon. The Saviles were an old gentry family of Yorkshire, where many of them served as MPs or sheriffs. George Savile himself was elected to serve as Member of Parliament for Boroughbridge in 1586 and for Yorkshire in 1593. He succeeded to the estate of Thornhill after the death of his cousin, Edward Savile, in February 1602/3. He was created a Baronet in 1611 by James I of England and was High Sheriff of Yorkshire for 1613–1614.

He married twice, with children by both wives. His first wife, Mary Talbot, was the daughter of the Earl of Shrewsbury, and brought the estate of Rufford Abbey into the Savile family. She was the mother of Sir George Savile, who predeceased his father but whose sons George and William succeeded in turn as the 2nd and 3rd Baronets. His second wife, Elizabeth Ayscough (widow of George Savile of Stanley), was the mother of three more sons (John, Richard, and Henry) and four daughters. Sir William, the 3rd baronet, was the father of George Savile, 1st Marquess of Halifax.

He died in 1622 and was buried in Thornhill church in Yorkshire.

Parliament of England
Preceded by Henry Cheke; Nicholas Faunt	Member of Parliament for Boroughbridge; 1586–1587; With: Robert Briggs	Succeeded by Sir Edward Fitton; Francis Moore
Preceded by Sir Henry Constable; Sir Ralph Bourchier	Member of Parliament for Yorkshire; 1593; With: John Aske	Succeeded by John Savile; Sir William Fairfax
Baronetage of England
New creation	Baronet (of Thornhill); 1611–1622	Succeeded by George Savile
