= Richard Bunny =

Richard Bunny may refer to:

- Richard Bunny (died 1584), MP for Bramber and Boroughbridge
- Richard Bunny (1541–1608), MP for Aldborough
