= Robert Kempe =

16th-century English politician

Robert Kempe (by 1526 – 1571 or later), of Lincoln's Inn, London and Spains Hall, Finchingfield, Essex, was an English politician.

He was a Member (MP) of the Parliament of England for Boroughbridge in 1555.

Parliament of England
Preceded by Christopher Wray; John Holmes	Member of Parliament for Boroughbridge; 1555; With: Christopher Wray	Succeeded by William Fairfax; Christopher Wray
