= Rabbitte =

Rabbitte is an Irish surname. Notable people with the name include:

- Anne Rabbitte (born 1970), Irish Fianna Fáil politician
- Darragh Rabbitte (born 1980), Irish hurler
- Joe Rabbitte (born 1970), Irish hurler
- Pat Rabbitte (born 1949), Irish Labour Party politician
- The Rabbitte family, fictional family of The Barrytown Trilogy by Roddy Doyle

== See also ==
- Rabbitt (disambiguation)
- Rabbit (disambiguation)
