= Social viewing =

Media viewing practice

Social viewing also known as a Watch Party is the recent practice of multiple users viewing online videos together and exchanging commentary. Typically, the experience also involves some form of instant messaging or communication to facilitate discussion pertaining to the common viewing experience.

Amazon Prime Video and Hulu use the branded term Watch Party for such a practice on its services, while Disney+ calls it GroupWatch.

== History ==
The term in this context originated with the Toronto and Los Angeles-based company View2Gether which has created proprietary technology for aggregating content from sources not controlled by the user for synchronized play and inclusion in common playlists by multiple participants with a commensurate instant messaging chat function. Other sites which provide similar functionality include Oortle (Photophlow), SeeToo and development of social viewing for existing portals such as Yahoo have recently been announced.

The term has been used in some cases to describe online viewing within the framework of a social network, however View2gether and similar sites have reconfigured the term to mean a common viewing experience as a social activity. Websites such as Rabb.it utilized a virtual computer with a shared browser, allowing for access to sites outside of the ones whitelisted by other viewers.

Social viewing has also been used in the past to describe activities such as gathering for the viewing of particular television programs, such as soap operas.

Some examples of modern social viewing sites include Twitch, YouTube, Facebook, TikTok, Instagram, Zoom, and Twitter.

It was also officially added as a built-in feature in some over-the-top media services in various names. While Amazon and Hulu both call it Watch Party, Disney+ (which offers it only in some countries) calls it GroupWatch, which launched in 2020, but in 2023 was removed.

== Social viewing experience ==
With social viewing technologies, media can be watched live alongside other viewers. Features such as built-in chats allow for communication to be sustained, facilitating real-time discussion of the content. A limitation that could be improved upon is the synchronization between users, as a mismatch in position of media may cause issues in understanding scenes between users in the same instance.
