= Robert Briggs (MP) =

16th-century English politician

Robert Briggs (died 1615), of Old Malton, Yorkshire, was an English politician.

He was a member (MP) of the parliament of England for Boroughbridge in 1586.

Parliament of England
Preceded by Henry Cheke; Nicholas Faunt	Member of Parliament for Boroughbridge; 1586; With: George Savile	Succeeded by Sir Edward Fitton; Francis Moore
