= George Lawson (MP for York) =

English Member of Parliament

Sir George Lawson

Member of the England Parliament for York
- In office 1529–1536
- Preceded by: Thomas Burton; John Norman
- Succeeded by: George Gale
- In office 1536–1539
- Preceded by: George Gale
- Succeeded by: John Hogeson; William Tancred

Personal details
- Born: 1493
- Died: 1543 (aged 49–50)
- Spouse: Elizabeth
- Relations: William Lawson of Cramlington (father); Anne Horsley of Thernham(mother)
- Children: George plus one other son and Anne
- a

Sir George Lawson was one of two Members of the Parliament of England for the constituency of York on two occasions from 1529 to 1533 and from 1533 to 1536.

== Life and politics ==
George was born around 1493 to William Lawson of Cramlington and Anne Horsley of Thernham. In 1516 he married Elizabeth and they had at least two sons, one named George, and one daughter named Anne. He was knighted in May 1530.

Throughout his life, he held many offices in both the city of York and for the Crown. He was Deputy Captain in the garrison of Berwick-upon-Tweed in 1514. He became a member of the Corpus Christi Guild in 1516 and an alderman from 1527 until his death in 1543. He served one term as Lord Mayor of York in 1530 as well as the two terms as MP for the city, sitting with George Gale. He also held the position of cofferer, or treasurer, in the household of Henry FitzRoy, Duke of Richmond and Somerset between 1526 and 1534. He was appointed Justice of the Peace for the East Riding of Yorkshire in 1532-33, the North Riding of Yorkshire in 1536 until his death and for the West Riding of Yorkshire from 1537 also until his death. He was also a member of the Council of the North from 1540.

Between 1513 and 1516, George built a reputation at the garrisons of Berwick-upon-Tweed and Tournai under the commands of Thomas Lord Darcy and William 4th Baron Mountjoy respectively. Having been a royal official helped him rise through the ranks in the city of York and also increased his wealth. George found himself playing the part of intermediary between Thomas Cromwell and Henry Percy, 5th Earl of Northumberland. During the Pilgrimage of Grace, George found himself in a difficult place politically being a government official but sympathizing with the rebels. When the rebels were admitted to the city of York, several lodged with him at his house. He was also reported to have attended the rebel council at Pontefract, but he eventually distanced himself from the movement to declare himself a loyal subject again. His loyalty was rewarded when he was commissioned to repair the castles of Sheriff Hutton, Pontefract, Sandal and Berwick. As religious houses surrendered to the Crown, George acquired the leases to the Whitefriars in Newcastle and the Augustinian priory in York adjacent to his house, converting it into a malting house. Around 1539-40, George bought a twenty-one year lease of the Austin Friars in London following its dissolution. George was not beyond criticizing the government where it conflicted with city matters. In 1536 he spoke out against a parliamentary bill that proposed the enclosure of common land on the Knavesmire.

He died in Berwick during a supply run to the garrison in February 1543.

Political offices
Preceded by Thomas Burton; John Norman	Member of Parliament; 1529-1533	Next: George Gale
Preceded by George Gale	Member of Parliament; 1533-1536	Next: John Hogeson; William Tancred
