= Greg Fischbach =

American Internet entrepreneur

Gregory Edmund Fischbach
- Occupations: Internet entrepreneur, attorney, business executive
- Known for: co-founder of video communication and content sharing company Rabb.it

Gregory Edmund Fischbach (born April 29, 1942) is an American Internet entrepreneur, attorney, business executive, co-founder of video communication and content sharing company Rabb.it and video game publisher Acclaim Entertainment (1987), he had managed the company for 16 years as the CEO.

Fischbach addressed the United States Senate regarding Internet privacy and ESRB ratings.

== Education ==
In 1963, Fischbach received his B.S. degree in economics from SF State University. He earned his J.D. from the University of California, Hastings College of the Law in 1966. Following an experience as a Peace Corps volunteer in Santiago, Chile, Fischbach started work as a trial attorney with the Civil Rights Division of the Department of Justice and afterwards was an Assistant United States Attorney for the Central District of California.

== Career ==
=== Fischbach & Fischbach ===
He commenced private practice with the law firms Orenstein, Arrow, Silverman and Parcher, a firm primarily engaged in representing record companies, music publishers and recording artists. In the mid-1970s, he founded the firm of Fischbach and Fischbach around several key artists including Crosby, Stills and Nash, Thin Lizzy, Emmylou Harris, Merle Haggard, JJ Cale, Boz Scaggs, and Gram Parsons amongst others; record labels (including Richard Branson's Virgin Group Records, Chrysalis Records and Mercury Records) and music publishers and, at the same time, managed The Steve Miller Band.

=== RCA Records and Activision International ===
He served as President of RCA Records International between 1986 and 1987, President of Activision International and a member of its Management Committee from 1983 to 1986.

=== Acclaim Entertainment ===
In 1987, Greg Fischbach co-founded Acclaim Entertainment Inc., a NASDAQ-listed company engaged in the video game business between 1987 and 2004. He was its Co-Chairman and CEO. Fischbach was the CEO of Acclaim Entertainment until 2003. After Fischbach's resignation Rod Cousens became his successor and steered to 2004.

For 10 years of Acclaim's work (1990-2000), the video game company released variety of well-known titles such as the Mortal Kombat and NBA Jam series, before Acclaim folded in 2004.

=== ESA and ESRB ===
Fischbach was one of the co-Founders of the ESA (Entertainment Software Association) and ESRB (Entertainment Software Rating Board) in the mid-1990s, and served as its Chairman for two years. The former is the videogame industry association which acts in part as a lobbying group; the later is the industry rating board, which is a non-profit, self-regulatory body that independently assigns content ratings, and enforces advertising guidelines for the videogame industry. Fischbach served on the boards of these organizations from 1994 to 2004.

=== Hampton Farms Ventures ===
Fischbach is a Founder and Managing Partner of Hampton Farms Ventures, formed in the Fall of 2004. Hampton Farms advises, invests and consults with companies in technology, media, games and entertainment.

He is Vice Chairman of the Board of Directors of Yoostar Entertainment and a member of its executive committee.

== Personal life ==
Gregory Fischbach is married to Linda Fischbach. Together they have two sons, Jason and Benjamin David Fischbach, who graduated from the University of Vermont. He worked as a brand manager at Acclaim Entertainment. Fischbach's wife Linda is a sales associate for Sotheby's International Real Estate. The family lives in New York.
