= Thomas Burton (16th century MP) =

English Member of Parliament

Member of the England Parliament for York
- In office 1523–1525
- Preceded by: William Nelson; William Wright
- Succeeded by: George Gale; George Lawson

Personal details
- Spouse: Maud Wylde
- Children: Anthony; Margaret

Thomas Burton was one of two Members of the Parliament of England for the constituency of York for 1523–1525.

== Life and politics ==
The early years of Thomas' life are not recorded. He is believed to have married Maud Wylde around 1490 with whom he had one son, Anthony, and one daughter, Margaret. In 1511 he became esquire at sword to the Lord Mayor of York. Three years later he joined the merchants guild and rose to the rank of master. He became Lord Mayor in 1522 when the incumbent, Paul Gyllour died. He resigned the post in 1523 to become MP for the city along with his trading partner John Norman. He died in 1525.

Political offices
Preceded by William Nelson; William Wright	Member of Parliament; 1523–1525	Next: George Gale; George Lawson
