= William Henry Clinton =

British Army officer and politician

General Sir William Henry Clinton GCB KCH
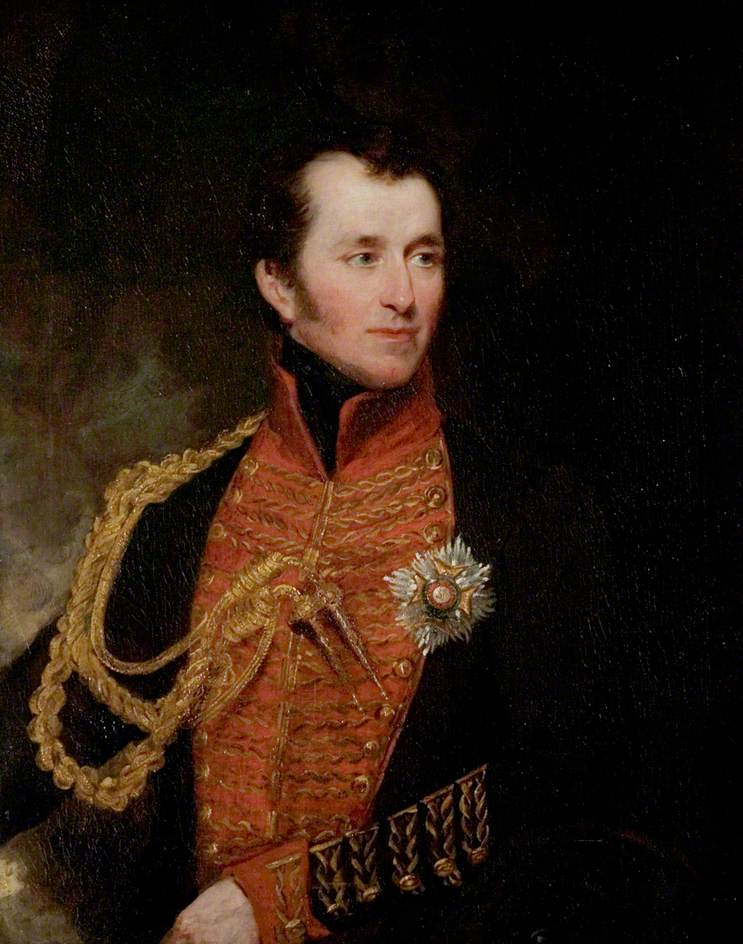
- Born: 23 December 1769
- Died: 15 February 1846 (aged 76)
- Military career
- Allegiance: Great Britain; United Kingdom
- Branch: British Army
- Rank: General
- Conflicts: French Revolutionary Wars; Napoleonic Wars; First Miguelist War
- Awards: Knight Grand Cross of the Order of the Bath

General Sir William Henry Clinton GCB KCH (23 December 1769 – 15 February 1846) was a British Army officer and politician who served in the French Revolutionary and Napoleonic Wars and the Liberal Wars. He was also the grandson of Admiral George Clinton and elder brother of Lieutenant-General Sir Henry Clinton.

== Military career ==
Born to General Sir Henry Clinton in 1769, Clinton entered the British Army in 1784 as a cornet in the 7th Light Dragoons. Under the Duke of York, Clinton took part in the Flanders and Low Countries campaigns as a captain in the 1st Guards in 1793, winning promotion to Lieutenant Colonel the following year. Serving as a Member of Parliament (MP) for East Retford from 1794 to 1796, he left Parliament to become aide-de-camp to the Duke.

In 1799, Clinton travelled to Italy on a diplomatic mission to Russian forces, before returning to take part in the Dutch expedition later that year. In 1801, he was promoted to the rank of colonel and participated in the capture of Madeira. He was then appointed governor of Madeira from July 1801 until March 1802, before becoming Military Secretary in 1803 and Quartermaster-General in Ireland in 1804. He returned to Parliament in 1806 as MP for Boroughbridge, a seat he held until 1818. After another diplomatic mission to Sweden in 1807, Clinton became a major-general the following year.

During 1812, Clinton served in the Mediterranean leading a division at Messina on the Italian island of Sicily, where he commanded a force of 12,000 British and Spanish troops. He commanded the 1st Division of the independent Army on the Tarragona, during the Peninsular War between 1812 and 1813, Clinton won distinction during the Battle of Castalla on 13 April 1813. In June 1813, Clinton became commander-in-chief of the British Forces in eastern Spain serving until April 1814, however he would see little action for the remainder of the war. After promotion to Lieutenant General, Clinton was knighted Order of the Bath in 1815. In 1814 he was given the Colonelcy of the 55th (Westmorland) Regiment of Foot, a position he held until his death.

Returning to his post as a member of Parliament, he would command a division consisting of around 5,000 soldiers during the First Miguelist War where he attempted to support Portuguese forces from December 1826 until April 1828. Promoted a full general, Clinton resigned from Parliament serving as governor of Chelsea Hospital from 1842 until his death on 15 February 1846 on Cockenhatch, near Royston, Herts. There is a memorial plaque to Clinton in St. Mary Magdalene Church, Barkway, Herts.

== Personal ==
Clinton was married to Louisa Dorothea Holroyd, daughter of John Baker Holroyd, 1st Earl of Sheffield. Clinton had two sons who both served in the British Army.

Parliament of Great Britain
Preceded by Sir John Ingilby; The Earl of Lincoln	Member of Parliament for East Retford; 1794–1796; With: Sir John Ingilby	Succeeded by William Petrie; Sir Wharton Amcotts
Parliament of the United Kingdom
Preceded by Edward Portman; Viscount Castlereagh	Member of Parliament for Boroughbridge; 1806–1818; With: Henry Dawkins to 1808; Henry Clinton from 1808	Succeeded by Marmaduke Lawson; George Mundy
Preceded by Henry Willoughby; George Hay Dawkins-Pennant	Member of Parliament for Newark; 1818–1829; With: Henry Willoughby	Succeeded by Henry Willoughby; Michael Thomas Sadler
Military offices
Preceded by Robert Brownrigg	Military Secretary; 1803–1804	Succeeded by James Willoughby Gordon
Preceded by Sir Colin Campbell	Colonel of the 55th (Westmorland) Regiment of Foot; 1814–1846	Succeeded by The Lord Saltoun
Preceded by Sir George Murray	Lieutenant-General of the Ordnance; 1825–1829	Succeeded by Lord Edward Somerset
