= Thomas Disney =

16th-century English politician

Thomas Disney (c. 1510 – 17 April 1568), of Carlton-le-Moorland, Lincolnshire, was an English politician.

He was a member (MP) of the parliament of England for Boroughbridge in 1563.

Parliament of England
Preceded by Sir John York; Richard Bunny	Member of Parliament for Boroughbridge; 1563; With: John Astley	Succeeded by Cotton Gargrave; Thomas Boynton
