= Rabbitt (disambiguation) =

Rabbitt was a South African rock band from 1972 to 1978

Rabbitt may also refer to:

people with the surname Rabbitt:

- Ann Rabbitt (born 1960), American civil servant and politician from New York
- Eddie Rabbitt (1941–1998), American singer and songwriter
- James Rabbitt (born 1941), Canadian businessman and former politician in British Columbia
- Joe Rabbitt (1900–1969), American Major League Baseball player
- Mary C. Rabbitt (1915–2002), American geologist
- Patrick Rabbitt, English psychologist
- Richard J. Rabbitt (1935–2011), American politician from Missouri

in other uses:

- Rabbitt (album) (1977), by Eddie Rabbitt
- RABBITT, an experimental technique for characterizing ultrashort laser pulses

== See also ==
- Terence Rabbitts (born 1946), British molecular biologist
- The Dead Rabbitts, American metal band
- Rabbit (disambiguation)
- Rabbitte (surname)
