= Henry Savile (died 1569) =

English politician

Henry Savile (1517/18–1569) was an English politician, and Surveyor of the Crown for the Northern Provinces.

He was a member (MP) of the parliament of England for Grantham in 1558 and for Yorkshire in 1559.

His will and issue are printed in full in the Yorkshire Archaeological Journal. By his second wife Joan Vernon, he was the father of Sir George Savile, 1st Baronet of Thornhill.
