= George Mundy =

Royal Navy Admiral (1777–1861)

Admiral Sir George Mundy KCB
- Born: 3 March 1777; Shipley Hall, Derbyshire
- Died: 9 February 1861 (aged 83); Grosvenor Street, London
- Military career
- Allegiance: United Kingdom
- Branch: Royal Navy
- Service years: 1789–1849
- Rank: Admiral
- Conflicts: French Revolutionary Wars; Siege of Toulon; Battle of Cape St Vincent; Battle of the Nile; Napoleonic Wars
- Awards: Knight Commander of the Order of the Bath

Admiral Sir George Mundy, KCB (3 March 1777 – 9 February 1861) was an officer of the British Royal Navy during the early nineteenth century, serving principally in the French Revolutionary and Napoleonic Wars. Born in Shipley Hall, Derbyshire, the son of politician Edward Miller Mundy, George Mundy joined the Navy at a young age and served in several of the principal actions of the French Revolutionary Wars. He subsequently held a succession of frigate commands during the Napoleonic Wars and was active in the blockade of the French coast and in assisting Spanish irregular forces during the Peninsular War. After the war Mundy remained in service and in 1830 was captain of the royal yacht Royal George. He was knighted in 1837 and continued to rise through the ranks, eventually becoming a full admiral in 1849.

== Life ==
George Mundy was born at Shipley Hall, Derbyshire in 1777, one of five sons of Edward Miller Mundy, the prominent MP for Derbyshire, and his first wife, Frances Meynell. In July 1789, he entered the Royal Naval Academy and in 1792 graduated to become a midshipman in the frigate HMS Blanche. Over the next year he moved to HMS Pegasus and then the ship of the line HMS Victory and the frigate HMS Juno. In Juno he was embroiled in the Siege of Toulon at the start of the French Revolutionary Wars, when his ship sailed into Toulon harbour after it had been evacuated by the allies and came under heavy fire from French Republican gun batteries and escaped with significant damage.

Continuing to operate in the Mediterranean, Juno was employed in the invasion of Corsica and Mundy was detached for service ashore, participating in the sieges of Calvi, San Fiorenzo and Bastia. During the rest of the Revolutionary Wars, Mundy remained with the Mediterranean Fleet, seeing action at the Battle of Cape St Vincent in 1797 and the Battle of the Nile in 1798. For his service at the latter, Mundy was promoted to commander and took over the 14-gun brig HMS Transfer, serving off the Spanish port of Cádiz.

After the Peace of Amiens Mundy remained in service, becoming a post captain aboard the small frigate HMS Carysfort and later moving to HMS Hydra on the Cádiz station, where he captured the French brig Furet in February 1806. After the outbreak of the Peninsular War in 1808, Mundy was actively engaged in supporting Spanish irregular forces with supplies and direct military assistance on the coast of Catalonia.

Mundy was appointed a Companion of the Order of the Bath on 4 June 1815 and remained in service, becoming the captain of the royal yacht Royal George in 1830 and being promoted to rear-admiral in the same year. Between 1820 and 1830 he sat in Parliament for the constituency of Boroughbridge. He continued to rise through the ranks, being advanced to Knight Commander of the Order of the Bath in 1837 and promoted to vice-admiral in 1841 and to full admiral in 1849. He died, aged 83, in 1861 at his home in Grosvenor Street, London.

== Additional sources ==
- Obituary, Ad. Sir George Mundy, K.C.B. 1861.

Parliament of the United Kingdom
Preceded by William Henry Clinton; Henry Clinton	Member of Parliament for Boroughbridge with Henry Dawkins; 1820–1830	Succeeded by Matthias Attwood; Charles Wetherell
