= Richard Bunny (1541–1608) =

16th-century English politician

Richard Bunny (1541–1608), of Newland and Normanton, Yorkshire, was an English politician.

== Family ==
Bunny was the second son of MP for Bramber and Boroughbridge, Richard Bunny and Bridget Restwold, daughter of Edward Restwold. Bunny married on 25 June 1580, Anne Ingpen, daughter of Francis Ingpen of Galaker, Wherwell, Hampshire. They had six sons and four daughters. His father disinherited the eldest son Edmund Bunny in Richard's favour when Edmund, against his father's wishes, entered the Church, although their father in his will insisted that he bore no grudge against Edmund.

== Career ==
He was a Member (MP) of the Parliament of England for Aldborough in 1572.

Parliament of England
Preceded by Thomas Eynns; Barnaby Googe	Member of Parliament for Aldborough; 1572; With: Richard Tempest	Succeeded by William Waad; David Waterhouse
