= Rabbit (nickname) =

Rabbit or The Rabbit is a nickname given to:

- Wayne Bartholomew (born 1954), Australian surfer
- Wes Bradshaw (1897–1960), American football player and coach
- Rabbit Brown (c. 1880–c. 1937), American blues guitarist and composer
- John Bundrick (born 1948), American rock musician
- Raymond Burnett (1914–1996), American football player and coach
- Irby Curry (1894–1918), American college football quarterback
- Johnny Hodges (1906–1970), American jazz saxophonist
- Miller Huggins (1879–1929), American Major League Baseball player and manager
- Otis Lawry (1893–1965), American Major League Baseball player
- Rabbit Maranville (1891–1954), American Major League Baseball player
- Edna Murray (1898–1966), American criminal
- Eric Parsons (1923–2011), English footballer
- Jimmy Slagle (1873–1956), American Major League Baseball player
- Ryland Steen, drummer known as "The Rabbit"
- Jackie Tavener (1897–1969), American Major League Baseball player
- Rabbit Warstler (1903–1964), American Major League Baseball player
- Rabbit Whitman (1897–1969), American minor league baseball player

== See also ==
- Ray Warren (born 1943), Australian sports commentator nicknamed "Rabbits"
- Walter Ball (baseball) (1877–1946), American Negro league baseball pitcher nicknamed "The Georgia Rabbit"
- Juancho Rois (born 1958), Colombian musician and composer nicknamed El Conejo ("the rabbit")
- Alberto Tarantini (born 1955), Argentine footballer nicknamed conejo
- B-Rabbit, a Hip Hop artist in the film 8 mile played by Eminem
- Bunny (nickname)
