= Bunney =

Bunney is a surname which may refer to:

- Sir Edmund Cradock-Hartopp, 1st Baronet (1749–1833), British politician born Edmund Bunney
- Elliot Bunney (born 1966), Scottish former sprinter
- Francis Bunney (1543–1617), English Anglican priest
- Joe Bunney (born 1993), English footballer
- John Wharlton Bunney (1828–1882), English topographical and landscape artist
- Michael Bunney (1873–1926), English architect
- Sydney John Bunney (1877–1928), English late Impressionist artist
- William E. Bunney, American neuroscientist

== See also ==
- Bunney Brooke (1921–2000), stage name of the Australian actress born Dorothy Cronin
