= Richard Bunny (died 1584) =

English politician (1525–1584)

Richard Bunny (by 1525 – 1584), of Bunny Hall, Wakefield and of Newland and Normanton, Yorkshire, was an English politician.

== Family ==
Bunny was the son of Richard Bunny (died 1535) and Rose Bunny, née Topcliffe, only daughter and heiress of Sir John Topcliffe of Topcliffe, Lord Chief Justice of Ireland (died 1513). He was educated at Gray's Inn, which he entered in 1538. He married Bridget Restwold, daughter of Edward Restwold of The Vache, Buckinghamshire, and had three sons, including his namesake and fellow MP, Richard Bunny, and Edmund Bunny, vicar of Bolton Percy, Selby, North Yorkshire. He disinherited Edmund, the eldest son in favour of Richard: apparently this was due to Edmund's decision to enter the Church, rather than the Law as his father wished. However, in his will, he insisted that he bore Edmund no ill-will.

== Career ==
He was a Member (MP) of the Parliament of England for Bramber in 1547 and for Boroughbridge in 1559. He held a number of Court offices, including the position of Treasurer of Berwick-upon-Tweed 1550–1554. He was removed from this office on the discovery of his record of embezzlement and forgery (charges which he always denied), and went into exile, using the pretext that as a staunch Protestant he had incurred the disfavour of Queen Mary. On the accession of Elizabeth I, he returned to England to resume his political career. Much of his time was devoted to the acquisition and management of land, although in his last will he referred to his "molestation" of his own estates. Like most landowners of the time, he was extremely litigious, even over such minor matters as a neighbour's right to erect a pew in the parish church.

He died on 30 April 1584 in Bolton Percy, the home of his son Edmund, to whom he left only personal property, the lands passing to the younger Richard. He explained in his will that he had decided not to leave Edmund any land, not because of any ill-feeling between them but because of the burden which would be placed on him, due to his own mismanagement of the estates. At the same time, he maintained his innocence of the charges of corruption brought against him thirty years earlier, arising from his service as Treasurer of Berwick.

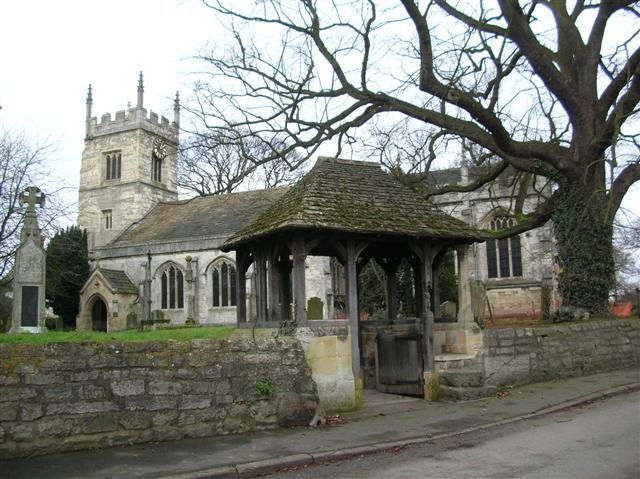
All Saints Church, Bolton Percy, where Bunny's son Edmund was vicar

Parliament of England
Preceded by William Sharington; John Fylde	Member of Parliament for Bramber; 1547; With: Chidiock Paulet	Succeeded by George Rithe; Lawrence Awen
Preceded by William Fairfax; Christopher Wray	Member of Parliament for Boroughbridge; 1559; With: Sir John York	Succeeded by John Astley; Thomas Disney
