= Edmund Bunny =

Edmund Bunny (1540–1619) was an Anglican churchman of Calvinist views.

== Life ==
He was born in 1540 at the Vache, the seat of Edward Restwold, his mother's father, near Chalfont St Giles, Buckinghamshire. He was the eldest son of Richard Bunny (d. 1584) of Newton or Bunny Hall in Wakefield parish, who was treasurer of Berwick, and otherwise employed in public services in the north, under Henry VIII and Edward VI; he suffered as a Protestant under Mary I, and obtained some compensation from Elizabeth I (16 June 1574).

Edmund was sent to Oxford University at the age of sixteen, and after graduating B.A. was elected probationer fellow of Magdalen College. His father meant him for the law, and sent him to Staple Inn and Gray's Inn. He decided to enter the church, and was disinherited in favour of Richard, the second son, for so doing.

On 30 March 1564 he received the prebend of Oxgate in St Paul's Cathedral, in succession to John Braban. Returning to Oxford he graduated M.A. on 14 February 1565, and was soon after elected fellow of Merton College; this was an unprecedented move, but the reason was that Merton had no one who could preach, while Bunny was a fluent extemporiser. On 10 July 1570 he was made B.D., and became in the same year chaplain to Edmund Grindal, archbishop of York, who made him subdean of York, in succession to Robert Babthorp, D.D. (d. 1570), and gave him the rectory of Bolton Percy. This he held for twenty-five years, and then resigned it. His subdeanery he resigned in 1579, and was succeeded by Henry Wright, M.A. In February 1579 he applied for the degree of D.D., but was refused. Retaining his London prebend, with another at York (Wistow, installed 21 October 1575), and a third at Carlisle (first stall, collated 2 July 1585), he devoted himself to the work of an itinerant preacher, travelling over most parts of England, attended by two servants on horseback, visiting towns and villages, and sometimes his university, as an evangelist.

He died at Cawood, Yorkshire, 26 February 1619, and was buried in York Minster, where there is a monument (with effigy) to his memory.

== Works ==
Bunny published:

- The Whole Summe of Christian Religion, given forth by two severall methodes or formes: the one higher, for the better learned, the other applyed to the capacitie of the common multitude, and meete for all, &c., 1576, (black letter).
- Institutionis Christianae Religionis, a Jo. Calvino conscriptae, compendium, &c. 1576. This abridgment of John Calvin's Institution was translated into English by Edward May, 1580, but had a rival abridgment by William Lawne, 1584, translated by C. Fetherstone, 1585.
- The Scepter of Judah; or what maner of government it was, that unto the commonwealth or church of Israel was by the will of God appointed, 1584.
- A Book of Christian Exercise, appertaining to Resolution, perused and accompanied now with a Treatise tending to Pacification, 1584 and many editions to 1630. The first part is the earlier half of a treatise by Robert Parsons, the Jesuit, with Bunny's alterations; the second part, printed separately, 1594 and 1598, is his own. Parsons published his work anonymously, with the initials R. P., and Bunny did not know who was the author; Parsons reissued his work with the title A Christian Directorie . . . with reprofe of the . . . falsified edition . . . published by E. Buny, 1585; for Bunny's defence see A briefe Answer below.
- Certaine Prayers and Godly Exercises for the xvii of November wherein we solemnize the blessed reign of our gracious sovereigne lady Elizabeth, &c. 1585 (dedication, dated York, 27 September 1585, to the archbishop of Canterbury; Peck says this book gave birth to the accession form).
- The Coronation of David: wherein out of that part of the Historic of David that showeth how he came to the Kingdome wee have set forth unto us what is like to be the end of these troubles that daylie arise for the gospels sake, 1588 (black letter).
- Necessary Admonition out of the prophet Joel, concerning that Hand of God that of late was upon us, &c. 1588.
- A briefe Answer unto those idle and frivolous quarrels of R. P. against the late edition of the Resolution, 1589, (licensed in 1587).
- Of Divorce for adulterie and Marrying againe; that there is no sufficient warrant so to do. With a note that R. P. many yeeres since was answered, Oxford, 1610; also London, same size and date.

Anthony Wood makes use of A Defence of his Labour in the Work of the Ministry (written 20 January 1602, and circulated in manuscript among his friends, against the charge of thrusting himself forward as a preacher), and mentions that Bunny had translated (apparently with revisions) the Imitatio Jesu Christi.
