= William Tancred (priest) =

William Tancred (11 May 1819- 24 May 1864) was an Anglican priest in Australia.

Tancred was educated at Christ Church, Oxford. He was Archdeacon of Launceston from 1854 to 1858. His last post was as Vicar of Kilmersdon.
