= Darragh Rabbitte =

Irish hurler

Personal information
- Native name: Darragh Ó Coinín (Irish)
- Born: 1980 (age 45–46) Borrisoleigh, County Tipperary, Ireland

Sport
- Sport: Hurling
- Position: Goalkeeper
Club
- Years: Club
- Borris–Ileigh
Club titles
- Tipperary titles: 0
Inter-county
Years	County	Apps (scores)
2001-2002	Tipperary	0 (0-00)
Inter-county titles
- Munster titles: 1 (Sub)
- All-Irelands: 1 (Sub)
- NHL: 0
- All Stars: 0

Darragh Rabbitte (born 1980) is an Irish hurler who played as a goalkeeper for the Tipperary senior team.

Rabbiitte joined the team during the 2001 championship and was a member of the team until he left the panel after the 2002 championship. He won a senior All-Ireland winners' medal as a non-playing substitute.

At club level Rabbitte plays with the Borris–Ileigh club.
