= Bunny (nickname) =

Bunny is a unisex hypocorism for various names derived from the colloquial term for a rabbit sometimes used as a term of endearment. It has also been used as an independent given name and stage name. It came to be regarded as a stereotypical preppy nickname during the 1980s. It is the nickname of:

== Male ==
- Bunny Ahearne (1900–1985), British ice hockey promoter
- Bunny Adair (1905–1994), Queensland politician and roustabout
- Bunny Allen (1906–2002), English hunter and safari guide
- Allu Arjun (born 1983), Indian actor
- Bunny Austin (1906–2000), British tennis player
- Bunny Berigan (1908–1942), American jazz trumpeter
- Bunny Breckinridge (1903–1996), American actor and drag queen best known for playing "The Ruler" in the film Plan 9 from Outer Space
- Bunny Brief (1892–1963), American baseball player
- Bunny Brunel (born 1950), French-born American jazz bassist
- Bunny Carr (1927–2018), Irish businessman and former television presenter
- Harold E. Comstock (1920–2009), American World War II fighter ace
- Bunny Currant (1911–2006), British Second World War fighter ace
- Napoleon Dame (1913–2006), Canadian ice hockey player
- Andrew Ramsay Don-Wauchope (1861–1948), Scottish rugby union player
- Bunny Downs (1894–1973), American baseball player
- Alec Eason (1889–1956), Australian rules footballer
- Bunny Fabrique (1887–1960), American baseball player
- Shirley Bunnie Foy (1936–2016), American jazz singer and songwriter
- David Garnett (1892–1981), British writer and publisher
- Bunny Gibbons, American funfair proprietor
- John Godwin (baseball) (1877–1956), American baseball player
- Bunny Grant (1940–2018), Jamaican retired boxer
- James Bernard Harkin (1875–1955), Canadian government bureaucrat, environmentalist and journalist
- E. Roland Harriman (1895–1978), American financier and philanthropist
- Bunny Hearn (1891–1959), American baseball pitcher
- Hugh High (1887–1962), American baseball player
- Andrew Huang (hacker) (born 1975), American hacker
- Bunny Jacob, Indian businessman and conductor
- Bunny Johnson (born 1947), British retired boxer
- Stanley Albert Joseph (1928–2001), Canadian lacrosse goaltender
- Bunny Larkin (born 1936), English retired footballer
- Michel Larocque (1952–1992), Canadian ice hockey player
- Bunny Lee (1941–2020), Jamaican record producer
- Bunny Lewis (1918–2001), English music manager, record producer, and composer
- Bunny Mack (1945–2015), Sierra Leonean musician
- Bunny Madden (1882–1954), American baseball player
- Bunny Matthews (1951–2021), American cartoonist
- Bunny Nunn (1927–2008), Australian soccer player
- Graham Onions (born 1982), English cricketer
- Bunny Pearce (1885–1933), American baseball player
- Bunny Phyoe (born 1992), Burmese R&B singer, songwriter, and actor
- Bunny Reid (1910–1976), South African rugby union player
- Bunny Roger (1911–1997), English couturier, inventor of Capri pants
- Bunny Roser (1901–1979), American baseball player
- Bunny Rugs (1948–2014), Jamaican reggae musician and singer
- Bunny Sigler (1941–2017), American pop and R&B songwriter and record producer
- Bunny Sterling (1948–2018), Jamaican-born British boxer
- Awdry Vaucour (1890–1918), English First World War flying ace
- Bernard Wadsworth, Canadian football player
- Bunny Wailer (1947–2021), Jamaican musician
- Bunny Walters (1953–2016), New Zealand singer and actor
- C. E. Webber (1909–1969), British television writer and playwright
- Edmund Wilson (1895–1972), American writer and critic
- Bernard Youens (1918–1984), English character actor best known for playing Stan Ogden in the soap opera Coronation Street

== Female ==
- Bunny Campione, British antiques expert and television personality
- Bunny DeBarge (born 1955), American singer, part of the R&B musical group Debarge
- Laura Dennis (born 1987), Canadian professional wrestler known as "The Bunny"
- Bunny Gibson (born 1946), American actress
- Bunny Greenhouse, American U.S. Army engineer and whistleblower
- Bunny Guinness (born 1955), British landscape architect, journalist and radio personality
- Bunny Hoest (born 1932), American comic strip writer
- Marian Koshland (1921–1997), American microbiologist and immunologist
- Bunny McBride, American ethnohistorian and poet
- Rachel Lambert Mellon (1910–2014), American horticulturalist, philanthropist, and art collector
- Bunny Meyer (born 1985), American YouTube personality
- L. R. Wright (1939–2001), Canadian mystery writer
- Bunny Yeager (1930–2014), American pin-up photographer and model
- Khadija Shaw (born 1997), Jamaican footballer

== See also ==
- Rabbit (nickname)
