= Boroughbridge (constituency) =

Parliamentary constituency in the United Kingdom, 1801–1832

- Former borough constituency for the House of Commons

1553–1832
- Seats: Two

Boroughbridge was a parliamentary borough in Yorkshire from 1553 until 1832, when it was abolished under the Great Reform Act. Throughout its existence it was represented by two Members of Parliament in the House of Commons.

The constituency consisted of the market town of Boroughbridge in the parish of Aldborough (which was also a borough with two MPs of its own). By 1831 it contained only 154 houses, and had a population of 947.

Boroughbridge was a burgage borough, meaning that the right to vote was vested in the tenants of certain specified properties, of which there seem to have been about 65 by the time the borough was abolished. Since these properties could be freely bought and sold, the effective power of election rested with whoever owned the majority of the burgages (who, if necessary, could simply assign the tenancies to reliable placemen shortly before an election). For more than a century before the Reform Act, Boroughbridge was owned by the Dukes of Newcastle, who controlled around fifteen seats across the country; however, in the 1790s, they sold one of the seats for £4,000 to the banker Thomas Coutts, who used it to put his son-in-law, Francis Burdett, into Parliament.

== Members of Parliament ==
- Constituency created (1553)

=== 1553–1640 ===
Parliament	First member	Second member
1553 (Oct)	William Tancred	Christopher Wray
1554 (Apr)	Ralph Cholmley	Christopher Wray
1554 (Nov)	Christopher Wray	John Holmes
1555	Christopher Wray	Robert Kempe
1558	William Fairfax	Christopher Wray
1558–9	Sir John York	Richard Bunny
1562–3	John Astley	Thomas Disney
1571	Cotton Gargrave	Thomas Boynton
1572 (Apr)	Thomas Eynns (died 1578)	Cotton Gargrave
1584 (Oct)	Henry Cheke	Nicholas Faunt
1586 (Sep)	George Savile	Robert Briggs
1588–9	Sir Edward Fitton	Francis Moore
1593	John Brograve	Vincent Skinner
1597 (Sep)	Henry Fanshawe	Thomas Crompton
1601	Richard Whalley	Thomas Fairfax
1604	John Ferne	Sir Henry Jenkins
1609	Sir Thomas Vavasour	Sir Henry Jenkins
1614	Sir Ferdinando Fairfax	George Marshall
1621	Sir Ferdinando Fairfax	George Wethered
1624	Sir Ferdinando Fairfax	Christopher Mainwaring
1625	Sir Ferdinando Fairfax	William Mainwaring
1626	Sir Ferdinando Fairfax	Philip Mainwaring
1628	Sir Ferdinando Fairfax	Francis Neville
1629–1640	No Parliaments summoned	

=== 1640–1832 ===
Year	First member	First party	Second member	Second party
April 1640	Ferdinando, Lord Fairfax		Francis Neville	
November 1640	Sir Philip Stapylton (d. September 1647)	Parliamentarian	Thomas Mauleverer	Parliamentarian
1648	Henry Stapylton		Thomas Mauleverer	Parliamentarian
December 1648	Stapylton excluded in Pride's Purge – seat vacant		Thomas Mauleverer	Parliamentarian
1653	Boroughbridge not represented in the Barebones Parliament and the First and Second Parliaments of the Protectorate			
January 1659	Colonel Laurence Parsons		Robert Stapylton	
May 1659	Not represented in the restored Rump as Thomas Mauleverer had died in the interim			
1660	Conyers Darcy		Sir Henry Stapylton	
1661	Sir Richard Mauleverer, Bt		Robert Long	
1673	Sir Richard Mauleverer, Bt		Sir Henry Goodricke, Bt	
1675	Sir Michael Warton		Sir Henry Goodricke, Bt	
March 1679	Sir Thomas Mauleverer, Bt		Sir Henry Goodricke, Bt	
August 1679	Sir Thomas Mauleverer, Bt		Sir John Brookes, Bt	
1685	Sir Thomas Mauleverer, Bt		Sir Henry Goodricke, Bt	
1689	Christopher Vane	Whig	Sir Henry Goodricke, Bt	
1690	Sir Brian Stapylton		Sir Henry Goodricke, Bt	
1695	Thomas Harrison		Sir Henry Goodricke, Bt	
1698	Sir Brian Stapylton		Sir Henry Goodricke, Bt	
1705	John Stapylton		Craven Peyton	
1708	Sir Brian Stapylton		Craven Peyton	
1713	Sir Brian Stapylton		Edmund Dunch	Whig
1715	Thomas Wilkinson		Sir Richard Steele	Whig
1718	Sir Wilfrid Lawson, Bt		Sir Richard Steele	Whig
March 1722	Conyers Darcy		James Tyrrell	
October 1722	Joseph Danvers		James Tyrrell	
1727	George Gregory		James Tyrrell	
1742	George Gregory		William Murray	Tory
1746	Earl of Dalkeith		William Murray	Tory
1750	Hon. Lewis Monson Watson		William Murray	Tory
1754	John Fuller		William Murray	Tory
1755	Sir Cecil Bisshopp, Bt		William Murray	Tory
1756	Sir Cecil Bisshopp, Bt		Earl of Euston	Whig
1757	Sir Cecil Bisshopp, Bt		Thomas Thoroton	
1761	Sir Cecil Bisshopp, Bt		Brice Fisher	
1767	Sir Cecil Bisshopp, Bt		James West the younger	
1768	Nathaniel Cholmley		James West	
1772	Nathaniel Cholmley		Major-General Henry Clinton	
1774	Anthony Eyre		Charles Mellish	
1775	Anthony Eyre		Colonel William Phillips	
1780	Anthony Eyre		Charles Ambler, KC	
1784	Sir Richard Sutton, Bt		The Viscount Palmerston	
1790	Sir Richard Sutton, Bt		Morris Robinson	
1796	Francis Burdett	Independent Radical	Sir John Scott	Tory
1799	Francis Burdett	Independent Radical	Hon. John Scott	Tory
1802	Edward Berkeley Portman	Whig	Hon. John Scott	Tory
January 1806	Edward Berkeley Portman	Whig	Viscount Castlereagh	Tory
November 1806	Brigadier William Henry Clinton	Tory	Henry Dawkins	Tory
1808	Brigadier William Henry Clinton	Tory	Henry Clinton	Tory
1818	Marmaduke Lawson	Whig	George Mundy	Tory
March 1820	Marmaduke Lawson	Whig	Richard Spooner	Radical
June 1820	Captain George Mundy, RN	Tory	Lt Colonel Henry Dawkins	Tory
1830	Sir Charles Wetherell	Tory	Matthias Attwood	Tory

- Constituency abolished (1832)

== Elections ==
Source: The Parliaments of England by Henry Stooks Smith (1st edition published in three volumes 1844–50), second edition edited (in one volume) by F.W.S. Craig (Political Reference Publications 1973)

=== Elections in the 1800s ===
At the 1802 general election, Edward Berkeley Portman and John Scott were elected unopposed.

At the 1806 and 1807 general elections, William Henry Clinton and Henry Dawkins were elected unopposed.

At the Boroughbridge by-election, 1808, Henry Clinton was elected unopposed.

=== Elections in the 1810s ===
At the 1812 general election, William Henry Clinton and Henry Clinton were elected unopposed.

General election 1818: Boroughbridge (2 seats)
Party	Candidate	Votes	%	±%
Tory	Marmaduke Lawson	37	39.8	N/A
Tory	George Mundy	33	35.5	N/A
Tory	Thomas Murdoch	25	24.7	N/A
Majority		8	8.8	N/A
Turnout		93		N/A

In the Boroughbridge by-election, 1819, Marmaduke Lawson was elected unopposed.

=== Elections in the 1820s ===
General election 1820: Boroughbridge (2 seats)
Party	Candidate	Votes	%	±%
Tory	Richard Spooner	38	28.6	N/A
Tory	Marmaduke Lawson	38	28.6	N/A
Tory	George Mundy	28	21.0	N/A
Tory	Henry Dawkins (1788–1864)	28	21.0	N/A
Majority		10	7.6	N/A
Turnout		133		N/A
Tory hold		Swing		

Mundy and Dawkins were seated on petition.

At the 1826 United Kingdom general election, George Mundy and Henry Dawkins were elected unopposed.

=== Elections in the 1830s ===
General election, 2 August 1830: Boroughbridge
Party	Candidate	Votes	%
Tory	Charles Wetherell	38	32.8
Tory	Matthias Attwood	38	32.8
Tory	Andrew Lawson	20	17.2
Tory	William Alexander Mackinnon	20	17.2
Majority		18	15.6
Turnout		c. 58	c. 89.2
Registered electors		c. 65	
Tory hold			
Tory hold			

General election, 29 April 1831: Boroughbridge
Party	Candidate	Votes	%
Tory	Charles Wetherell	Unopposed	
Tory	Matthias Attwood	Unopposed	
Registered electors		c. 65	
Tory hold			
Tory hold			
