= Sydney John Bunney =

- Born: 1877; Coventry, Warwickshire
- Died: 24 April 1928 (aged 50); Coventry, Warwickshire
- Education: Coventry School of Art
- Occupations: Artist, clerk
- Style: Late Impressionist

Sydney John Bunney (1877 – 24 April 1928) was an English late Impressionist artist who left over 500 drawings of early 20th-century Coventry.

== Biography ==
Little is known of Bunney's life. He was born in Coventry, the third child of George Bunney, a ribbon warehouseman, and his wife, Eliza. In 1892, he was a student at Coventry School of Art. He maintained contact with the school for many years, becoming the first Secretary to the school's sketch club in April 1907. He resigned from the post three years later but remained a member of the club until 1916.

In 1899, he was a student at South Kensington Art School. Bunney also worked as an accountant and later became a cashier at the Auto Machinery Company Limited in Coventry and lived at 154 Albany Road, Earlsdon. Bunney's work as an artist matured under the influence of William Milnes, who became the headmaster at Coventry School of Art in 1906. Milnes encouraged students to follow the example of Turner by taking quick sketches under differing conditions. This, according to Milnes, would give the artist a greater understanding of nature in its various moods. Many of Coventry's medieval buildings had survived up to the early 20th century, and Milnes pointed out that many of the buildings were suitable for studies on the effect of light. Several students took up this idea, including H. E. Cox, and Bunney became a prolific painter of Coventry scenes. His body of work records the city as a market town, the streets lined with red-brick and half-timbered shops and houses. Most of these pieces are small and intimate works of art.

He had great difficulty in having his work exhibited at any of the big shows, such as those at the Royal Academy, and interest in his work largely waned before he was rediscovered in the late 20th century. His works are now held in the collection at the Herbert Art Gallery and Museum in Coventry.

== Gallery ==
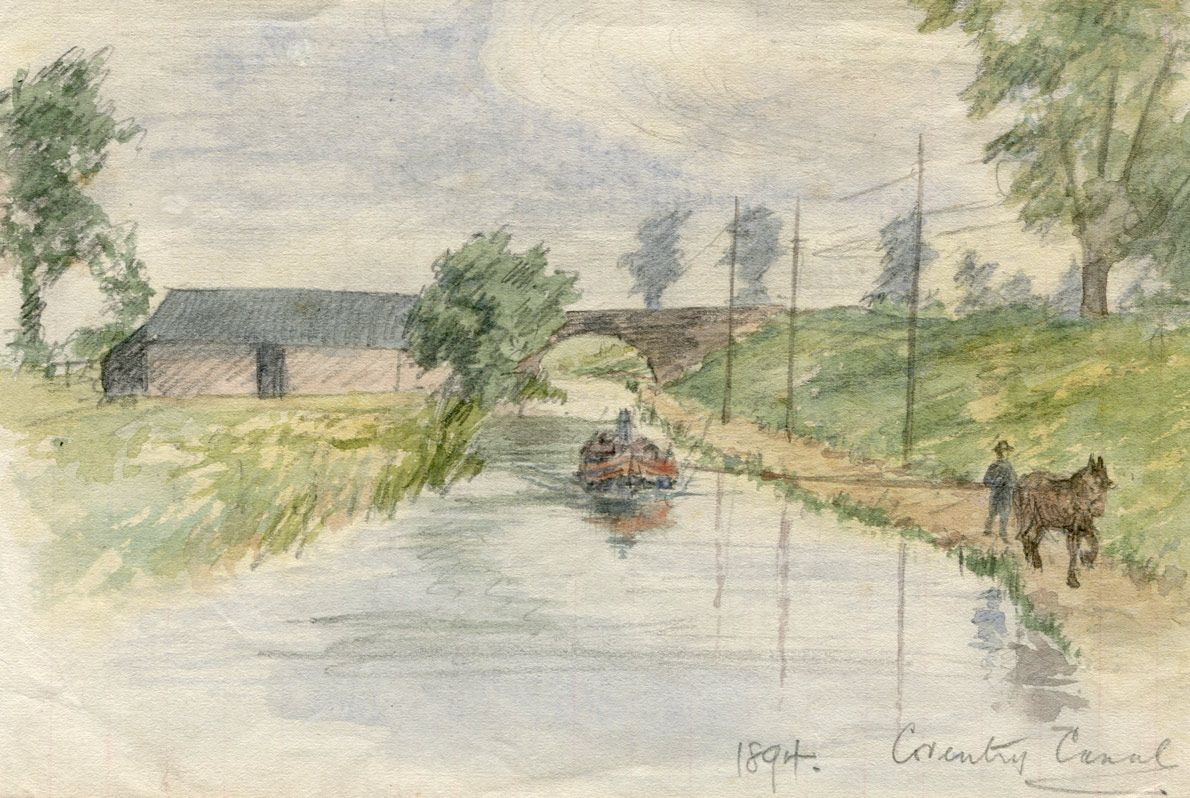
Coventry Canal, 1894

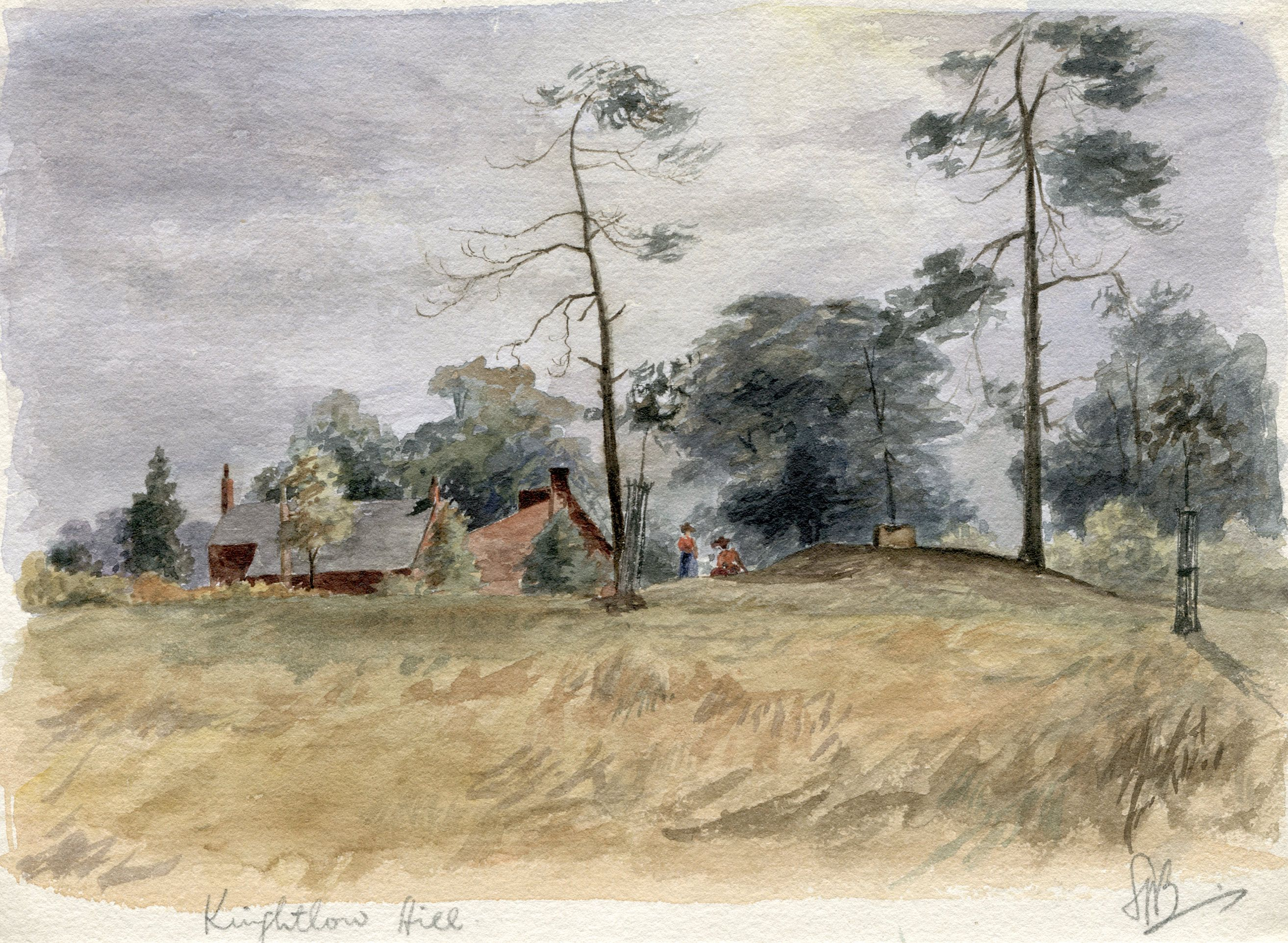
Knightlow Hill, 1895

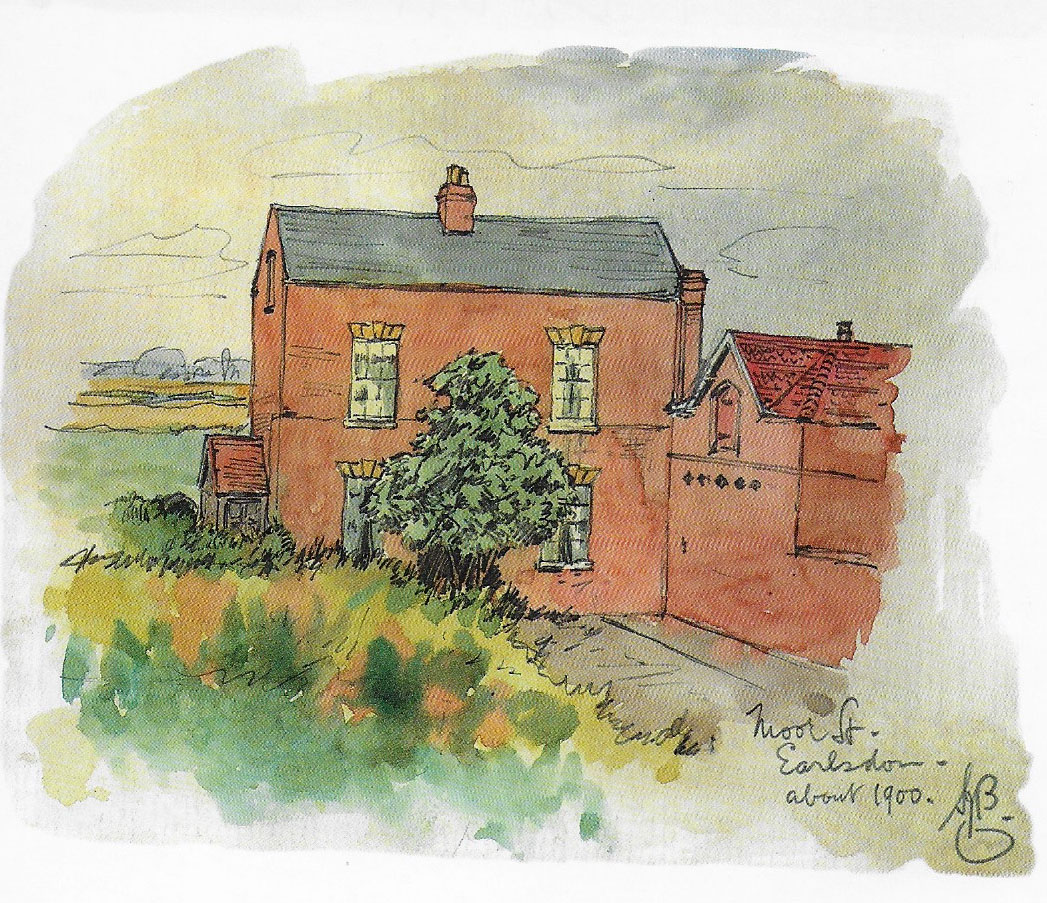
Moor Street, 1900

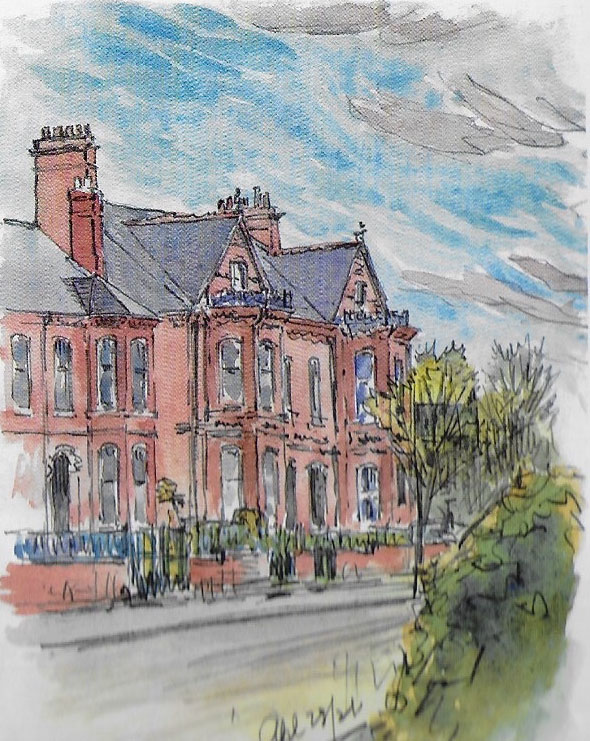
Albany Road, Earlsdon

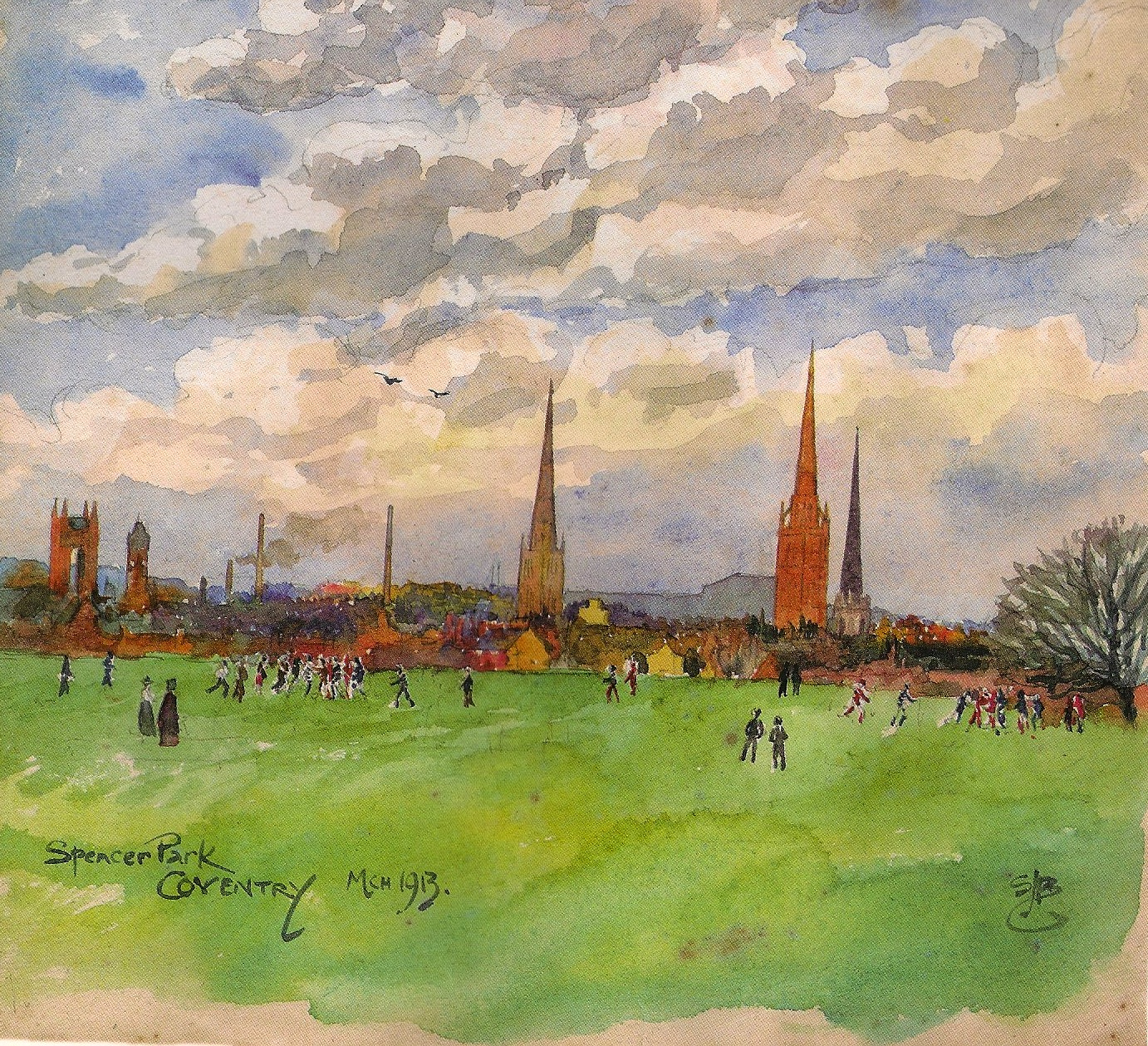
Spencer Park, 1913

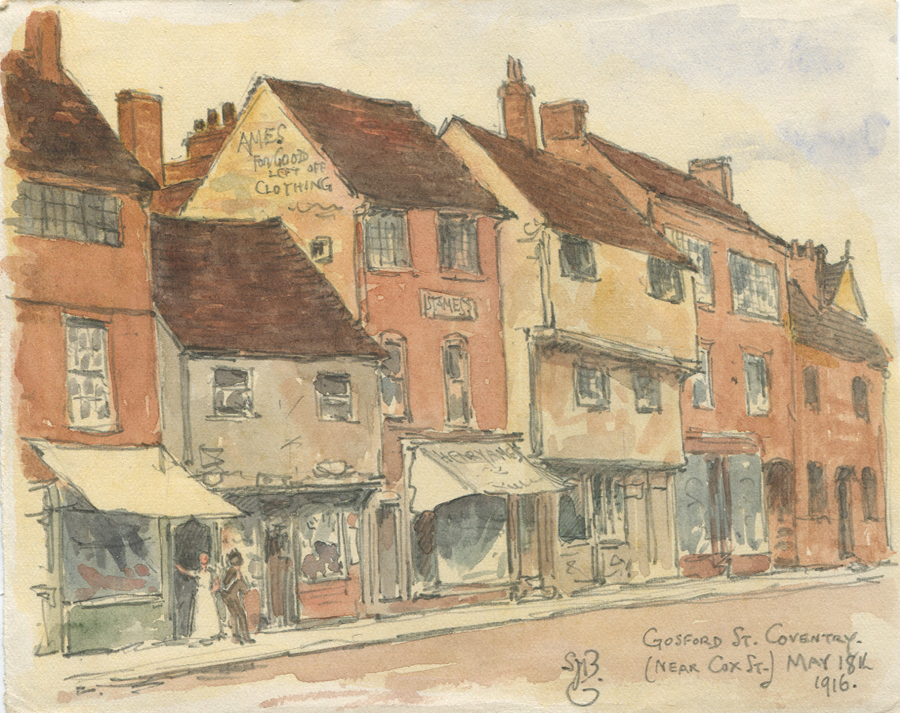
Gosford Street, 1916

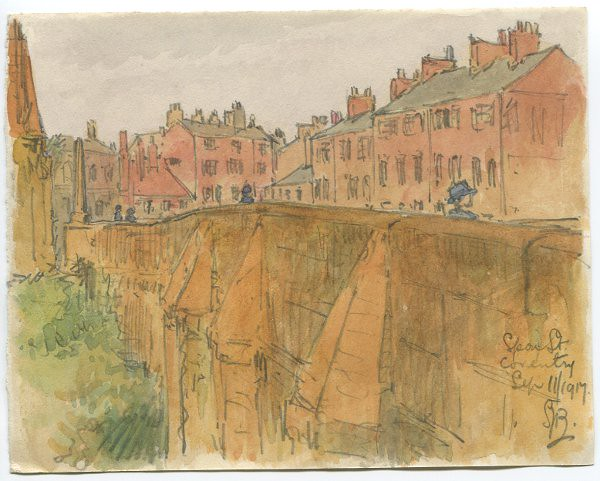
Spon Street, 1917

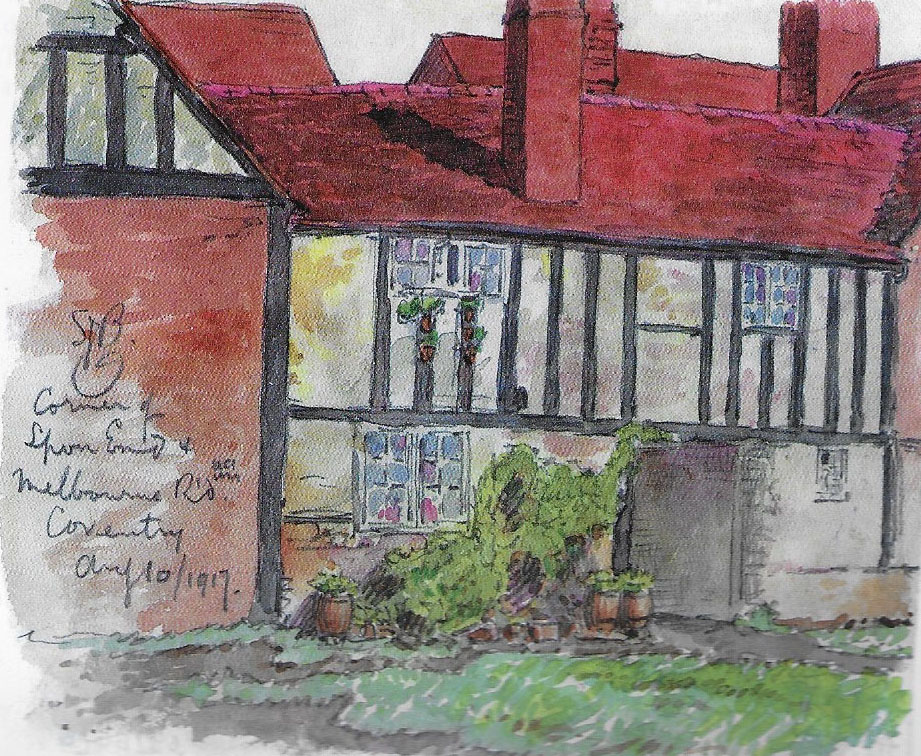
Melbourne Road, 1924
