= John Holmes (by 1529 – 1583) =

English politician

John Holmes (by 1529 – 4 June 1583), of London, North Mimms, Hertfordshire and Owston and Hampole, Yorkshire, was an English politician.

He was a Member (MP) of the Parliament of England for Boroughbridge in November 1554 and for Ripon in 1555.
