= List of British Army formations during the French Revolutionary and Napoleonic Wars =

== Armies ==
=== French Revolutionary Wars ===
Armies
Formation name	Created	Ceased to exist	Locations served	Notes	Ref
York's Flanders					
York's Holland					
Abercromby's Egypt					

=== Napoleonic Wars ===
Armies
Formation name	Created	Ceased to exist	Locations served	Notes	Ref
Stuart's Naples					
Cathcart's Hanover					
Cathcart's Copenhagen					
Moore's Corunna army					
Army on the Tarragona					
Wellesley's Peninsular					
Beckwith's Martinique and Guadeloupe					
Chatham's Walcheren					
Anglo-Portuguese Army					

=== Hundred Days ===
Armies
Formation name	Created	Ceased to exist	Locations served	Notes	Ref
Waterloo					
Allied Army of Occupation in France					

== Corps ==
=== Peninsular War ===
Corps
Formation name	Created	Ceased to exist	Locations served	Notes	Ref
Beresford's Corps	March 1812		Portugal, Spain, France	Commanded by Lieutenant-General Sir William Beresford. Comprised the 3rd, 4th, and Light Divisions in 1812.	
Hill's Corps	Winter 1809		Portugal, Spain, France	Originally commanded by Lieutenant-General Sir Rowland Hill. Temporarily replaced by Beresford on 1 January 1811 due to illness, but returned on 27 May.	
Hope's Corps	April 1813		Portugal, Spain, France	Originally commanded by Lieutenant-General Sir Thomas Graham, who was replaced due to ill health by Lieutenant-General Sir John Hope in October.	

=== Waterloo campaign ===
Corps
Formation name	Created	Ceased to exist	Locations served	Notes	Ref
First Corps			Southern Netherlands, France		
Second Corps			Southern Netherlands, France		
Brunswick Corps			Southern Netherlands, France		
Hanoverian Reserve Corps			Southern Netherlands, France		

== Ad-hoc divisions ==
=== Egypt (Abercromby's army) ===
Divisions
Formation name	Created	Ceased to exist	Locations served	Notes	Ref
Infantry Division					
Cavalry Division					

=== Hanover Expedition (Cathcart's army) ===
Divisions
Formation name	Created	Ceased to exist	Locations served	Notes	Ref
1st Division	November 1805	February 1806	Hanover	The division was split up along the English coast upon its return from Hanover to assist in defence against possible French invasion	
2nd Division	November 1805	February 1806	Hanover	The division was split up along the English coast upon its return from Hanover to assist in defence against possible French invasion	

=== Copenhagen (Cathcart's army) ===
Divisions
Formation name	Created	Ceased to exist	Locations served	Notes	Ref
KGL Division					
Right Division					
Left Division					
KGL Cavalry Division					

=== Peninsular War (Dalrymple/Moore's army) ===
Divisions
Formation name	Created	Ceased to exist	Locations served	Notes	Ref
1st Division					
2nd Division					
3rd Division					
Reserve Division					
Cavalry Division					

=== Peninsular War (Army on the Tarragona) ===
Divisions
Formation name	Created	Ceased to exist	Locations served	Notes	Ref
1st Division					
2nd Division					

=== Martinique and Guadeloupe (Beckwith's army) ===
Divisions
Formation name	Created	Ceased to exist	Locations served	Notes	Ref
1st Division					
2nd Division					

=== Walcheren (Chatham's army) ===
Divisions
Formation name	Created	Ceased to exist	Locations served	Notes	Ref
1st Division					
2nd Division					
3rd Division					
4th Division					
5th Division					
Light Division					

== Semi-permanent divisions ==
=== Peninsular War (Wellington's Army) ===
Divisions
Formation name	Created	Ceased to exist	Locations served	Notes	Ref
1st Division	18 June 1809	April 1814	Portugal, Spain, France	At the conclusion of the Peninsular War, in 1814, the division was disbanded in France.	
2nd Division	18 June 1809	April 1814	Portugal, Spain, France	At the conclusion of the Peninsular War, in 1814, the division was disbanded in France.	
3rd Division	18 June 1809	April 1814	Portugal, Spain, France	At the conclusion of the Peninsular War, in 1814, the division was disbanded in France.	
4th Division	18 June 1809	April 1814	Portugal, Spain, France	At the conclusion of the Peninsular War, in 1814, the division was disbanded in France.	
5th Division	6 October 1810	April 1814	Portugal, Spain, France	At the conclusion of the Peninsular War, in 1814, the division was disbanded in France.	
6th Division	6 October 1810	April 1814	Portugal, Spain, France	At the conclusion of the Peninsular War, in 1814, the division was disbanded in France.	
7th Division	5 March 1811	April 1814	Portugal, Spain, France	At the conclusion of the Peninsular War, in 1814, the division was disbanded in France.	
Light Division	22 February 1810	1814?			
1st Cavalry Division	19 June 1811	21 April 1813	Spain	Served with main field army. Broken up into individual brigades under a over-all cavalry commander.	
2nd Cavalry Division	19 June 1811	21 April 1813	Spain	Served with Hill's Corps. Broken up into individual brigades under a over-all cavalry commander.	

=== War of the Seventh Coalition ===
Divisions
Formation name	Created	Ceased to exist	Locations served	Notes	Ref
1st Division	11 April 1815	December 1818	Southern Netherlands, France	The Army of Occupation was disbanded, along with its divisions, in December 1818 when it departed France.	
2nd Division	11 April 1815	December 1818	Southern Netherlands, France	The Army of Occupation was disbanded, along with its divisions, in December 1818 when it departed France.	
3rd Division	11 April 1815	1 April 1817	Southern Netherlands, France	Formed part of the Army of Occupation, in France, following the Waterloo campaign	
4th Division	11 April 1815	1815	Southern Netherlands, France	Following the conclusion of the Napoleonic Wars, the British military in France was reorganised into three divisions on 30 November 1815. The remaining forces, including the 4th Division, were officially stood down and withdrawn from France. The withdrawal started in December and was finalized by February 1816.	
5th Division	11 April 1815	1815	Southern Netherlands, France	Following the conclusion of the Napoleonic Wars, the British military in France was reorganised into three divisions on 30 November 1815. The remaining forces, including the 5th Division, were officially stood down and withdrawn from France. The withdrawal started in December and was finalized by February 1816.	
5th Division	11 April 1815	1815	Southern Netherlands, France	Following the conclusion of the Napoleonic Wars, the British military in France was reorganised into three divisions on 30 November 1815. The remaining forces, including the 5th Division, were officially stood down and withdrawn from France. The withdrawal started in December and was finalized by February 1816.	
6th Division		1815			
7th Division		1815			

== Notes ==
Footnotes

Citations
