= The Rabbit (Manet 1881) =

Painting by Édouard Manet

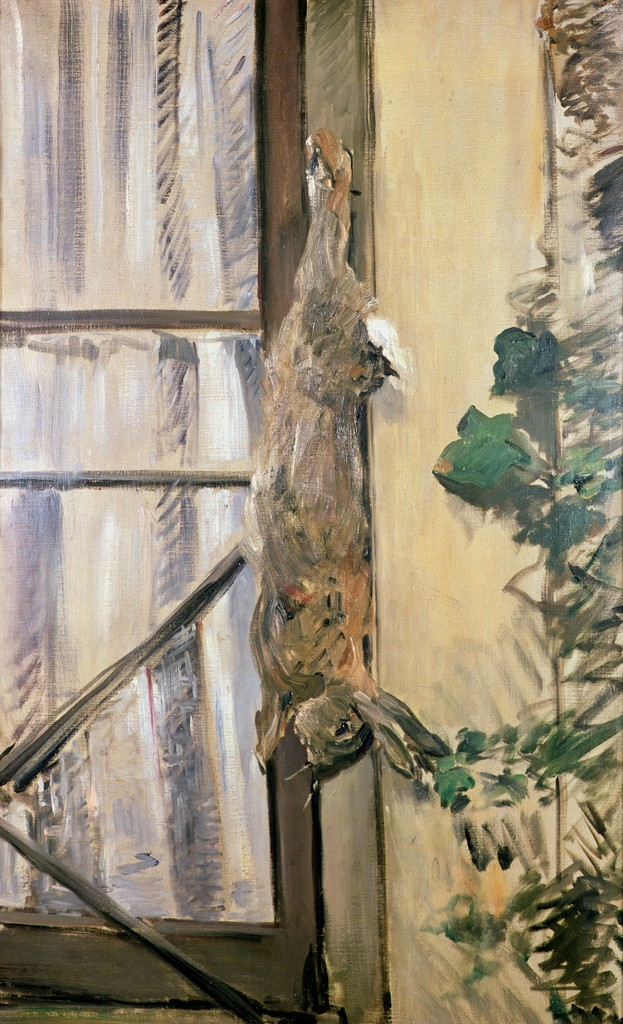
- Artist: Édouard Manet
- Year: 1881
- Medium: Oil on canvas
- Dimensions: 97.5 cm × 61 cm (38.4 in × 24 in)
- Location: National Museum Wales; Cardiff

The Rabbit is an 1881 oil painting by the French artist Édouard Manet, now displayed at the National Museum Wales in Cardiff, Wales. The work is a still life featuring a hung rabbit or hare (the work is sometimes referred as The Hare) which has been placed on a hook outside a closed house window.

== Origin ==
The Rabbit was conceived as one of four decorative panels, and was painted not long after Manet had suggested a series of panels for the meeting chamber at the Hôtel de Ville in Paris, though nothing came of this concept. Completed in 1881, when Manet's health was in decline, The Rabbit was painted while the artist was spending the summer months at a villa in Versailles. The painting, which was one of the central pairings of a four panel set, was part of a new cycle of decorative work undertaken by Manet while at Versailles. The other central panel, along with The Rabbit conceived to representing hunting trophies, was The Eagle Owl which as of 2012 is part of the Buhrle Collection in Zurich. The outer panels illustrate, on one a vine on a trellis and the other a corner of a garden. Two other pictures were grouped as part of the same inventory from his studio at the time of Manet's death, a vase of flowers and a watering can; but although they may be related to the same cycle of work are not believed to be part of the set of panels related to The Rabbit.

The work was initially submitted to the Salon in Paris in 1882, but was not accepted. It was sold after Manet's death as part of a studio sale to the art dealer Paul Durand-Ruel. It later passed into the ownership of the Paris-based art firm, Bernheim-Jeune. In 1917 The Rabbit was purchased from Bernheim-Jeune by the Welsh philanthrapist Gwendoline Davies, who in 1918 exhibited it at the Victoria Art Gallery in Bath. On Gwendoline's death in 1951, she bequeathed her collection of Impressionist works to the National Museum of Wales, among them The Rabbit. As of 2012 it is on view at the National Museum Cardiff in gallery 11.

== Analysis ==
The Rabbit is painted in a bold and loose style, and is intended to be viewed from a distance. This is in stark contrast to an earlier work by Manet also entitled the Rabbit (1866), which is completed in a far more traditional French style of still-life painting. This earlier painting, which is in the style of Chardin, is far more conventional and detailed than the later painting. The 1881 picture is a far more casual work, with fast and broad brushstrokes suggesting various textures, not only in the fur of the dead animal, but also in the curtains behind the window and the climbing plant which both frame the hanging rabbit. This latter work is much closer to the Impressionist style.

== Gallery ==
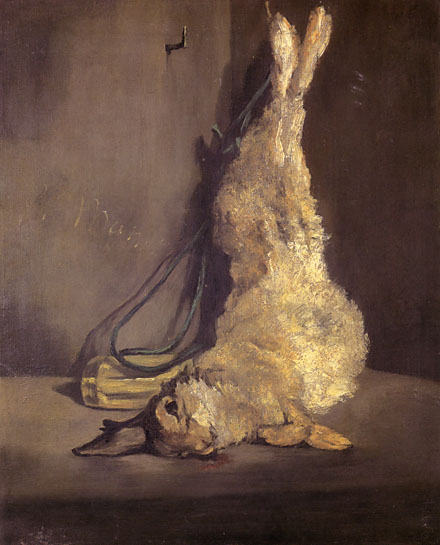
Manet's 1866 painting held at Fondation Dubrujeaud, Avignon

== See also ==
- List of paintings by Édouard Manet
