= John Hogeson =

English Member of Parliament

Member of the England Parliament for York
- In office 1539–1542
- Preceded by: George Gale; Sir George Lawson
- Succeeded by: George Gale
- In office 1542–1547
- Preceded by: George Gale
- Succeeded by: John North; Robert Hall

John Hogeson was one of two members of the Parliament of England for the constituency of York on two occasions between 1539 and 1542 and from 1542 to 1547.

== Life and politics ==
John was born around 1493 to Thomas Hogeson. He married Margaret, daughter of Sir John Gilliot and had at least one son, James, and one daughter.

He became a member of the Corpus Christi Guild in York in 1514 and a member of the Merchant Guild a year later. He was a constable of the city of York in 1522 and also held the offices of senior chamberlain (1525); sheriff (1527); alderman (1528–1548) and lord mayor in 1533. He was chosen to be the MP for the city on two consecutive parliaments between 1539 and 1547. There are only a few details of his merchant activities that list his interest in herring, pepper and stone for buildings.

His term as lord mayor was marred by dispute with other aldermen who accused him of nepotism by making a relative master of the Guild of St Christopher and St George while dismissing two other aldermen. Of his time in Parliament, the only noteworthy act he accomplished was to secure a monopoly on the production of coverlets in Yorkshire for the city's traders.

Hogeson was captured at the Battle of Ancrum Moor during the War of Rough Wooing which ended his terms as alderman. When he was released from prison, he was placed in the garrison of Berwick.

Political offices
Preceded by George Gale; Sir George Lawson	Member of Parliament; 1539-1542	Next: George Gale
Preceded by George Gale	Member of Parliament; 1542-1547	Next: John North; Robert Hall
