= Henry Clinton (British Army officer, born 1771) =

British Army officer

Lieutenant-General Sir Henry Clinton GCB GCH
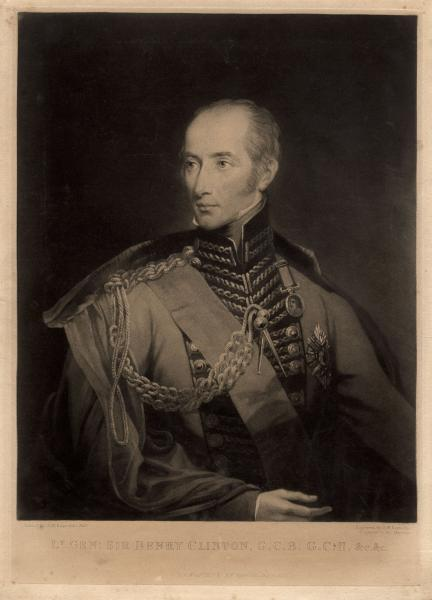
- Born: 9 March 1771
- Died: 11 December 1829 (aged 58)
- Military career
- Allegiance: Great Britain; United Kingdom
- Branch: British Army
- Rank: Lieutenant-General
- Conflicts: French Revolutionary Wars; Peninsular War
- Awards: Knight Grand Cross of the Order of the Bath; Knight Grand Cross of the Royal Guelphic Order

Lieutenant-General Sir Henry Clinton GCB GCH (9 March 1771 – 11 December 1829) was a British Army officer who served in the French Revolutionary and Napoleonic Wars. He came from a family of soldiers. His elder brother was William Henry Clinton and his father was General Sir Henry Clinton the British Commander-in-Chief in North America during the American Revolutionary War, and his grandfather was Admiral of the Fleet George Clinton (1686–1761).

== Early military career ==
Clinton first went to sea as a midshipman in 1786 in HMS Salisbury with Captain Erasmus Gower who was flag captain to Commodore John Elliot. Elliot was commander-in-chief and governor of Newfoundland from 1786 to 1788. Clinton suffered from severe seasickness and left the navy at the completion of three years with Captain Gower in Newfoundland.

He received his officer's commission in 1787. He went on to serve in the Flanders campaign as an aide-de-camp to the Prince Frederick, Duke of York and Albany, starting in 1793. He was promoted to lieutenant colonel in 1795. Captured by the French, he was a prisoner in 1796–1797. During the 1799 campaign in northern Italy, he was a liaison officer with Alexander Suvarov's Russian army. He went to India as adjutant general from 1802 to 1805.

At the Battle of Austerlitz in 1805, Clinton was the British military attaché to the Russian army. He commanded the garrison of Syracuse in Sicily in 1806–1807.

== Parliamentary career ==
He became a member of parliament for Boroughbridge in 1808, holding the seat for the next 10 years.

== Peninsula ==
During the campaign and Battle of Corunna in 1808–1809, he served as Sir John Moore's adjutant general and was promoted to major-general in 1810.

During the remainder of the Peninsular War he commanded an infantry division under the Marquess of Wellington (later the Duke of Wellington). He was first appointed to command the 6th Division on 9 February 1812. During the Battle of Salamanca, his division played a key part by defeating French General Bertrand Clausel's counterattack. He then led his division in the Siege of Burgos campaign. From 26 January to 25 June 1813, Clinton was absent and Edward Pakenham took over the 6th Division. For his conduct at the Vitoria campaign, Clinton was made a Knight Grand Cross of the Order of the Bath (GCB).

He was absent again from 22 July to October, when he again assumed command of the 6th Division. He was given the local rank of lieutenant general in 1813. He took part in the subsequent victories at the battles of the Nivelle, the Nive, Orthez and Toulouse. At the end of the Peninsular War he was made a lieutenant general and inspector-general of infantry, and was awarded the Army Gold Cross with one clasp.

== Waterloo ==
In 1815 during the Battle of Waterloo, Clinton led the 2nd Division which Wellington posted in reserve behind his right flank. The 2nd Division included the 3rd British Brigade (Maj-Gen Frederick Adam), the 1st King's German Legion (KGL) Brigade (Col Du Plat), the 3rd Hanoverian Brigade (Col Hugh Halkett) and Lieut-Col Gold's two artillery batteries (Bolton RA and Sympher KGL). His troops helped to defeat and pursue Napoleon's Imperial Guard at the end of the battle.

== Later life ==
In 1815 he was made Colonel of the Buffs (Royal East Kent Regiment), a position he held until his death.

He died at his country residence in Ashley, Hampshire on 11 December 1829. He had married Susan, the daughter of Francis Charteris, Lord Elcho. They had no children.

== Places named for Clinton ==
- Clinton, Ontario, Canada

== Notes ==
Parliament of the United Kingdom
Preceded by William Henry Clinton; Henry Dawkins	Member of Parliament for Boroughbridge; 1808–1818; With: William Henry Clinton	Succeeded by Marmaduke Lawson; George Mundy
Military offices
Preceded by Charles Leigh	Colonel of the 3rd (the East Kent) Regiment of Foot; 1815–1829	Succeeded by Sir George Don
