= William Tancred (politician) =

16th-century English politician

William Tancred or Tankerd (by 1508 – 13 August 1573), of Boroughbridge, Yorkshire, was an English politician.

He was a member (MP) of the parliament of England for York in 1539 and for Boroughbridge in October 1553.
