= Nicholas Faunt =

English politician

Nicholas Faunt (fl. 1572–1608) was an English clerk of the signet, agent of the Crown, and politician.

== Life ==
Faunt was a native of Norfolk. An earlier person of the same name, who was mayor of Canterbury and M.P. for the city in 1460, had played a prominent part in Warwick the Kingmaker's rebellion of 1471, actively supported Thomas Neville (the "Bastard of Fauconberg") in his raid on London, and was beheaded at Canterbury by Edward IV's orders in May 1471. The clerk to the signet matriculated as a pensioner at Gonville and Caius College, Cambridge, in June 1572, and was admitted a scholar of Corpus Christi College in the same university in 1573. In the interval he visited Paris, witnessed the St. Bartholomew massacre, and was one of the first to bring the news to England. About 1580 he became secretary to Sir Francis Walsingham, and was engaged in carrying despatches to English agents abroad and sending home 'intelligence.' In August 1580, while in Paris, he met Anthony Bacon, who became a close friend.

Early in 1581 he spent three and a half months in Germany, and was at Pisa, Padua, and Geneva later in the same year. He came from Paris in March 1582 and returned in February 1587–8. On 23 November 1585 he became M.P. for Boroughbridge.

Faunt was very friendly with both Anthony and Francis Bacon, and, as an earnest puritan, was implicitly trusted by their mother, Lady Anne Bacon, who often wrote to her sons imploring them to benefit by Faunt's advice. He met Anthony on his return from the continent early in 1592, and conducted him to his brother Francis's lodgings in Gray's Inn.

In 1603 Faunt was clerk of the signet, an office which he was still holding on 20 September 1607. In March 1605–6 there was talk of his succeeding Ralph Winwood as ambassador at the Hague. In 1594 Faunt obtained a grant of crown lands in Yorkshire; in 1607 the reversion to Fulbrook Park, Warwickshire, and in the same year a promise from Sir Robert Cecil to obtain some land belonging to the archdiocese of York.

== Works ==
His letters, sent home while on the continent, show him to have been an assiduous collector of information and a loyal public servant. He wrote 'A Discourse touching the Office of Principal Secretary of State,’ 1592 (unprinted), in Bodleian Library, Tanner MS. 80, f. 91.

== Family ==
Faunt married in 1584–5 the daughter of a London merchant named Archer. His second wife was Abigail Kelke, daughter of Roger Kelke; they had three sons and three daughters.
