= Rabb.it =

Defunct American video-streaming website

Rabbit
- Website type: Content-sharing
- Website: www.rabb.it
- Commercial: Yes
- Registration: Optional
- Launched: 2013
- Current status: Defunct as of July 31, 2019

Rabbit, also known as Rabb.it, was a video streaming website and mobile application. Launched in 2014, and based in California, United States, the service enabled multiple people to remotely browse and watch the same content in real-time.

A host could create a room, invite others to it (or, alternatively, set it to public so the room appeared on the site's homepage for anyone to join), and share content using a virtual computer called a "Rabbitcast," or using the Google Chrome extension "Share on Rabbit." Whatever content the host opened was displayed to the other users in the room along with audio and video. Rabbit offered text and video chat alongside this functionality.

Unlike other popular streaming websites such as YouTube and Netflix, Rabbit did not host the content viewed on it. Instead, Rabbit streamed a virtual computer (Rabbitcast) with a browser, which could then be used to navigate to other websites and content. A Rabbitcast was a Rabbit-hosted, shared Firefox browser that could be viewed and controlled by anyone within the room. The built-in web browser had an ad-blocker pre-installed.

== History ==
After a beta release in 2013 which offered limited Mac-only functionality, the company redesigned Rabbit as a web app in the summer of 2014. The service took off, adding 400,000 users by the end of the year. With around 3.6 million monthly active users, Rabbit users viewed content using the service for an average of 12.5 hours a month, with the most active users doing so for 28.5 hours a month. The company had 30 employees worldwide as of May 2019.

In July 2019, Rabbit announced that the site was soon to cease operations; a round of VC funding had failed in May, and the CEO was forced to lay off staff and begin shutting Rabbit down immediately. Despite announcements that all staff members had been let go, the site remained semi-functional until July 31, 2019 when the servers were shut down.

On July 31, 2019, it was announced that its remaining assets—intellectual property, software stack, and several patents—had been acquired by fellow streaming service Kast.
